= Asahi, Toyama =

Asahi 朝日町
- Town
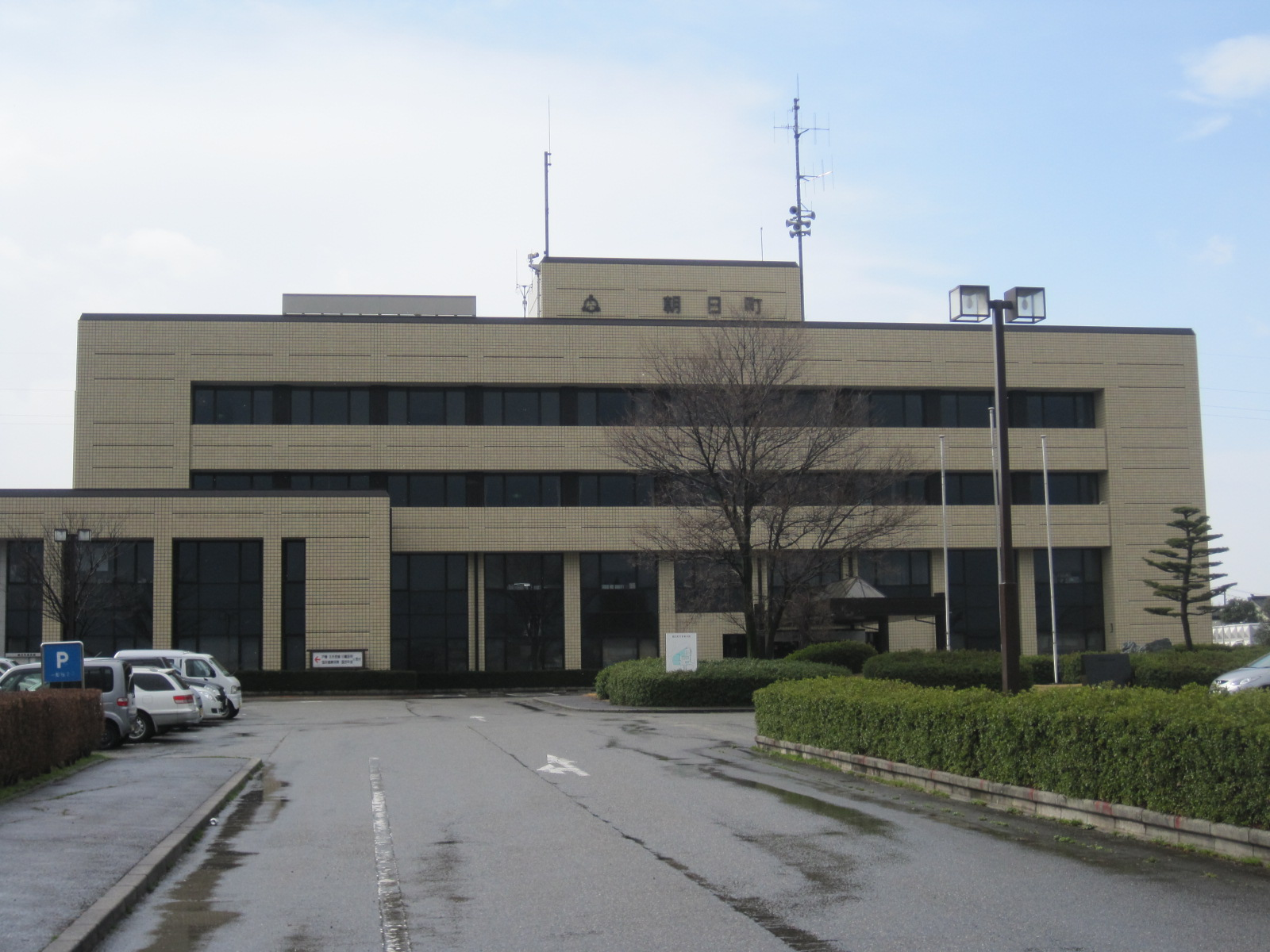
- Asahi Town Hall

- Flag Seal

- Location of Asahi in Toyama Prefecture

- Coordinates: 36°56′46.2″N 137°33′35.8″E
- Country: Japan
- Region: Chūbu (Hokuriku)
- Prefecture: Toyama
- District: Shimoniikawa

Government
  - Mayor: Yasunao Sasahara

Area
  - Total: 226.30 km^{2} (87.37 sq mi)

Population (October 1, 2020)
  - Total: 11,093
  - Density: 49.02/km^{2} (127.0/sq mi)
- Time zone: UTC+09:00 (JST)
- Postal code: 939-0793
- Phone number: 0765-83-1100
- Address: 1133 Dōge, Asahi-machi, Shimoniikawa-gun, Toyama-ken
- Climate: Cfa
- Website: Official website
- Symbols
- Flower: Azalea
- Tree: Pinus parviflora

Asahi (朝日町, Asahi-machi) is a town located in Shimoniikawa District, Toyama Prefecture, Japan. As of 1 April 2018, the town had an estimated population of 11,574 and a population density of 51.1 persons per km^{2}. Its total area was 226.30 square kilometres (87.37 sq mi). The town claims to be the birthplace of beach volleyball.

== Geography ==
Asahi is located in north-west Toyama Prefecture, in between the North Alps and the Sea of Japan. Mount Shirouma is the highest point, with an elevation of 2,932 meters.

=== Climate ===
The town has a humid subtropical climate (Köppen Cfa) characterized by hot summers and cold winters with heavy snowfall. The average annual temperature in Asahi is 13.9 °C. The average annual rainfall is 2219 mm with September as the wettest month. The temperatures are highest on average in August, at around 26.2 °C, and lowest in January, at around 2.5 °C.

Climate data for Asahi (1991−2020 normals, extremes 1978−present)
Month	Jan	Feb	Mar	Apr	May	Jun	Jul	Aug	Sep	Oct	Nov	Dec	Year
Record high °C (°F)	18.7 (65.7)	23.6 (74.5)	29.1 (84.4)	30.3 (86.5)	33.3 (91.9)	33.4 (92.1)	37.2 (99.0)	37.2 (99.0)	38.0 (100.4)	34.3 (93.7)	26.4 (79.5)	24.1 (75.4)	38.0 (100.4)
Mean daily maximum °C (°F)	6.4 (43.5)	7.1 (44.8)	11.1 (52.0)	16.5 (61.7)	21.7 (71.1)	24.8 (76.6)	29.1 (84.4)	30.8 (87.4)	26.8 (80.2)	21.3 (70.3)	15.5 (59.9)	9.6 (49.3)	18.4 (65.1)
Daily mean °C (°F)	3.4 (38.1)	3.6 (38.5)	6.8 (44.2)	11.9 (53.4)	17.1 (62.8)	20.9 (69.6)	25.1 (77.2)	26.6 (79.9)	22.7 (72.9)	17.2 (63.0)	11.5 (52.7)	6.2 (43.2)	14.4 (58.0)
Mean daily minimum °C (°F)	0.7 (33.3)	0.5 (32.9)	2.9 (37.2)	7.7 (45.9)	13.2 (55.8)	17.7 (63.9)	22.1 (71.8)	23.1 (73.6)	19.3 (66.7)	13.6 (56.5)	7.9 (46.2)	3.1 (37.6)	11.0 (51.8)
Record low °C (°F)	−8.1 (17.4)	−6.9 (19.6)	−4.0 (24.8)	−1.3 (29.7)	5.0 (41.0)	10.8 (51.4)	15.2 (59.4)	14.8 (58.6)	10.9 (51.6)	4.5 (40.1)	0.1 (32.2)	−4.5 (23.9)	−8.1 (17.4)
Average precipitation mm (inches)	279.1 (10.99)	184.7 (7.27)	194.3 (7.65)	167.6 (6.60)	155.0 (6.10)	188.4 (7.42)	253.4 (9.98)	214.5 (8.44)	242.4 (9.54)	228.0 (8.98)	309.2 (12.17)	350.0 (13.78)	2,748.7 (108.22)
Average snowfall cm (inches)	104 (41)	86 (34)	15 (5.9)	1 (0.4)	0 (0)	0 (0)	0 (0)	0 (0)	0 (0)	0 (0)	0 (0)	37 (15)	240 (94)
Average precipitation days (≥ 1.0 mm)	24.0	19.4	18.0	13.3	11.7	11.4	13.3	10.5	13.4	14.2	18.4	23.4	191
Average snowy days (≥ 3 cm)	10.2	8.4	1.6	0.1	0	0	0	0	0	0	0	4.0	24.3
Mean monthly sunshine hours	49.5	79.2	130.2	179.4	205.1	164.2	160.7	215.3	148.9	141.9	96.1	56.6	1,632.6
Source: Japan Meteorological Agency

=== Surrounding municipalities ===
- Nagano Prefecture
  - Hakuba
- Niigata Prefecture
  - Itoigawa
- Toyama Prefecture
  - Kurobe
  - Nyūzen

== Demographics ==
Per Japanese census data, the population of Asahi has decreased over the past 50 years.

Historical population
Year	Pop.	±%
1970	19,311	—
1980	18,631	−3.5%
1990	17,569	−5.7%
2000	15,915	−9.4%
2010	13,651	−14.2%
2020	11,081	−18.8%

== History ==
The area of present-day Asahi was part of ancient Etchū Province. During the Edo period, the Tomari developed as a post station on the Hokurikudo highway. The area was organised as part of Shimoniikawa District, Toyama after the Meiji restoration. The modern town of Tomari was created with the establishment of the municipalities system on April 1, 1889. It merged with six surrounding villages to form the town of Asahi on August 1, 1954.

== Economy ==
Asahi is dependent on agriculture and commercial fishing. Notable crops include rice, asparagus, and Spaghetti squash.

== Education ==
Asahi has two public elementary schools and one public middle school operated by the town government, and one public high school operated by the Toyama Prefectural Board of Education.

== Transportation ==
=== Railway ===
- Ainokaze Toyama Railway Line
  - Tomari – Etchū-Miyazaki

=== Highway ===
National Route 8

== Local attractions ==
- Fudōdō Site, ruins of a Jōmon period settlement and a National Historic Site.
