= Mount Tate =

Mountain in the country of Japan

- Tateyama, 立山
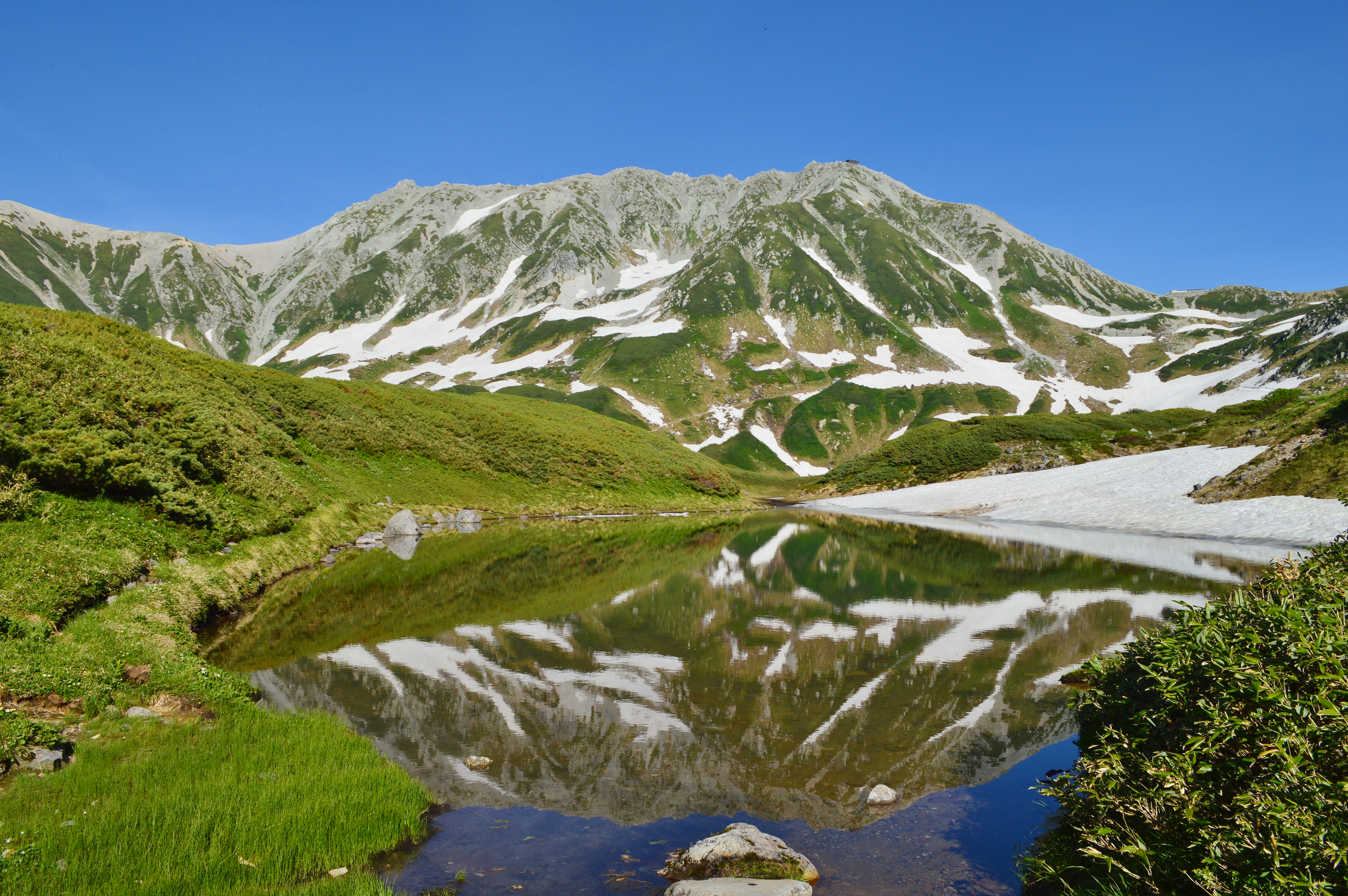
- Mount Tate (Mount Fuji-no-Oritate, Mount Oonanji, Mount O) and Mikuri Pond

Highest point
- Elevation: 3,015 m (9,892 ft)
- Listing: List of mountains in Japan; 100 Famous Japanese Mountains
- Coordinates: 36°34′33″N 137°37′11″E

Naming
- English translation: Standing Mountain
- Language of name: Japanese

Geography
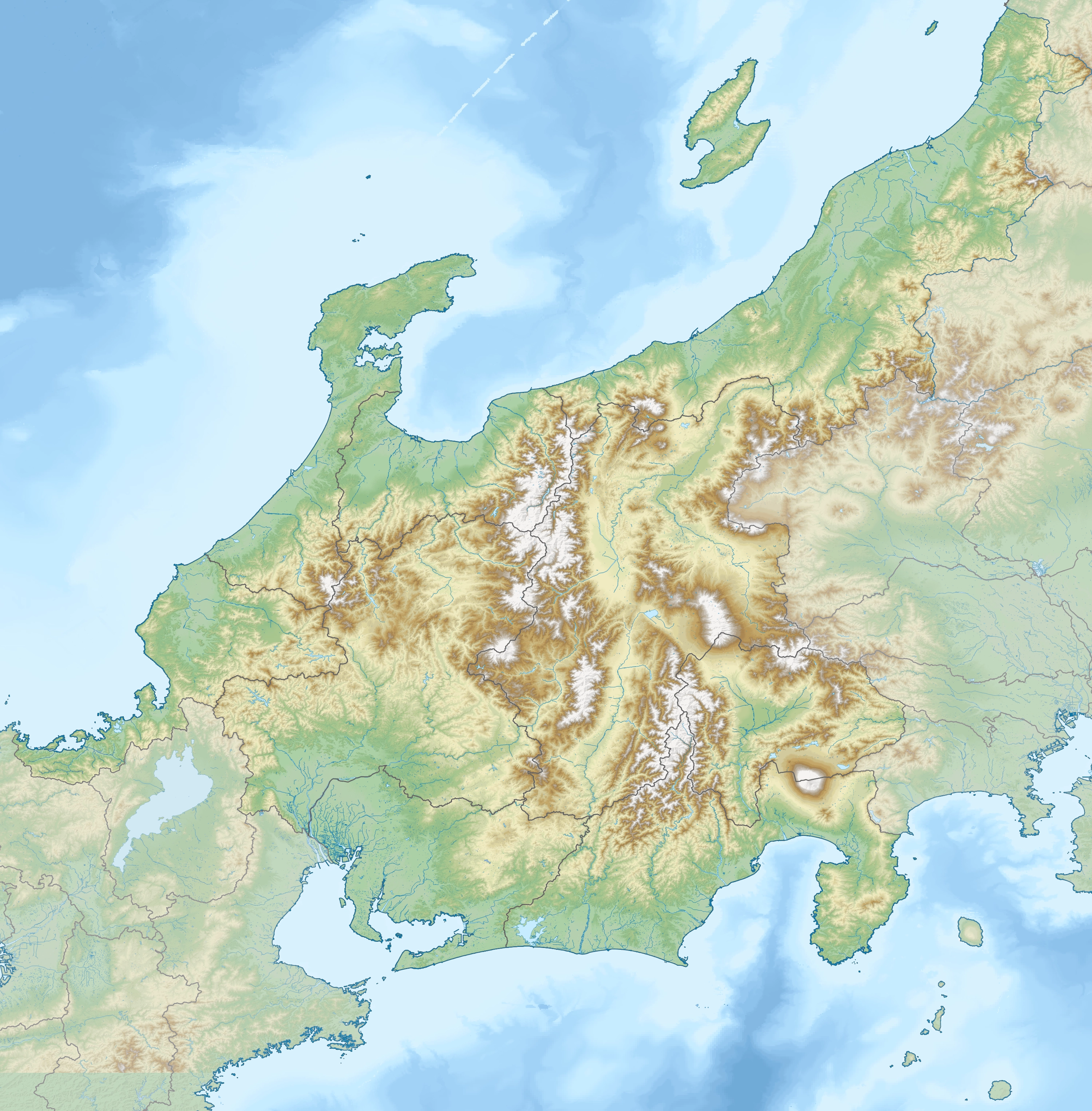
- Location within Japan Location within Chubu region Location within Toyama Prefecture
- Location: Toyama Prefecture, Japan
- Parent range: Hida Mountains
- Topo map(s): Geospatial Information Authority 25000:1 剱岳; 50000:1 立山

Climbing
- First ascent: Saeki no Ariyori c. 8th century AD

Mount Tate (立山, Tate-yama; IPA: [tateꜜjama]), also known as Tateyama, is a mountain located in the southeastern area of Toyama Prefecture, Japan. It is one of the tallest mountains in the Hida Mountains at 3,015 m (9,892 ft) and one of Japan's Three Holy Mountains (三霊山, Sanreizan) along with Mount Fuji and Mount Haku. Tateyama consists of three peaks: Ōnanjiyama (大汝山, 3,015 m), Oyama (雄山, 3,003 m), and Fuji-no-Oritate, (富士ノ折立, 2,999m) which form a ridge line. Tateyama is the tallest mountain in the Tateyama Mountain Range (立山連峰, Tateyama-renpō).

The Oyama Shrine is located on Oyama Peak.

Mount Tate was first climbed by Saeki no Ariyori, during Japan's Asuka period. The area was incorporated into the Chūbu-Sangaku National Park on 4 December 1934.

== Name ==
The kanji name for the mountain is 立山, Tateyama in Japanese, which means "standing (立) or outstanding (顕)" and "mountain (山)," respectively. The Toyama Prefectural Government uses the name Mount Tateyama as an official translation of the Japanese mountain.

== Geology ==
The mountain is primarily composed of granite and gneiss. However, located along the ridge and plateau, about 2 km (1.2 mi) west of the summit, there is a small andesite-dacite stratovolcano. This volcano has an elevation of 2,621 m (8,599 ft) and has minor eruptions, the latest occurring in 1961.

== Geography ==
=== Location ===
Tateyama is located in southeastern Toyama Prefecture. At the base of the mountain is the town of Tateyama which is accessible by train from the prefecture's capital city, Toyama. Public transportation takes climbers and tourists as far as the Murodo Plateau Station at an elevation of 2,450 m (8,038 ft), where individuals may climb to the peak on foot. This location allows for the formation of snow and its accumulation, forming glaciers. These are the only glaciers identified in Japan so far.

=== Nearby mountains ===
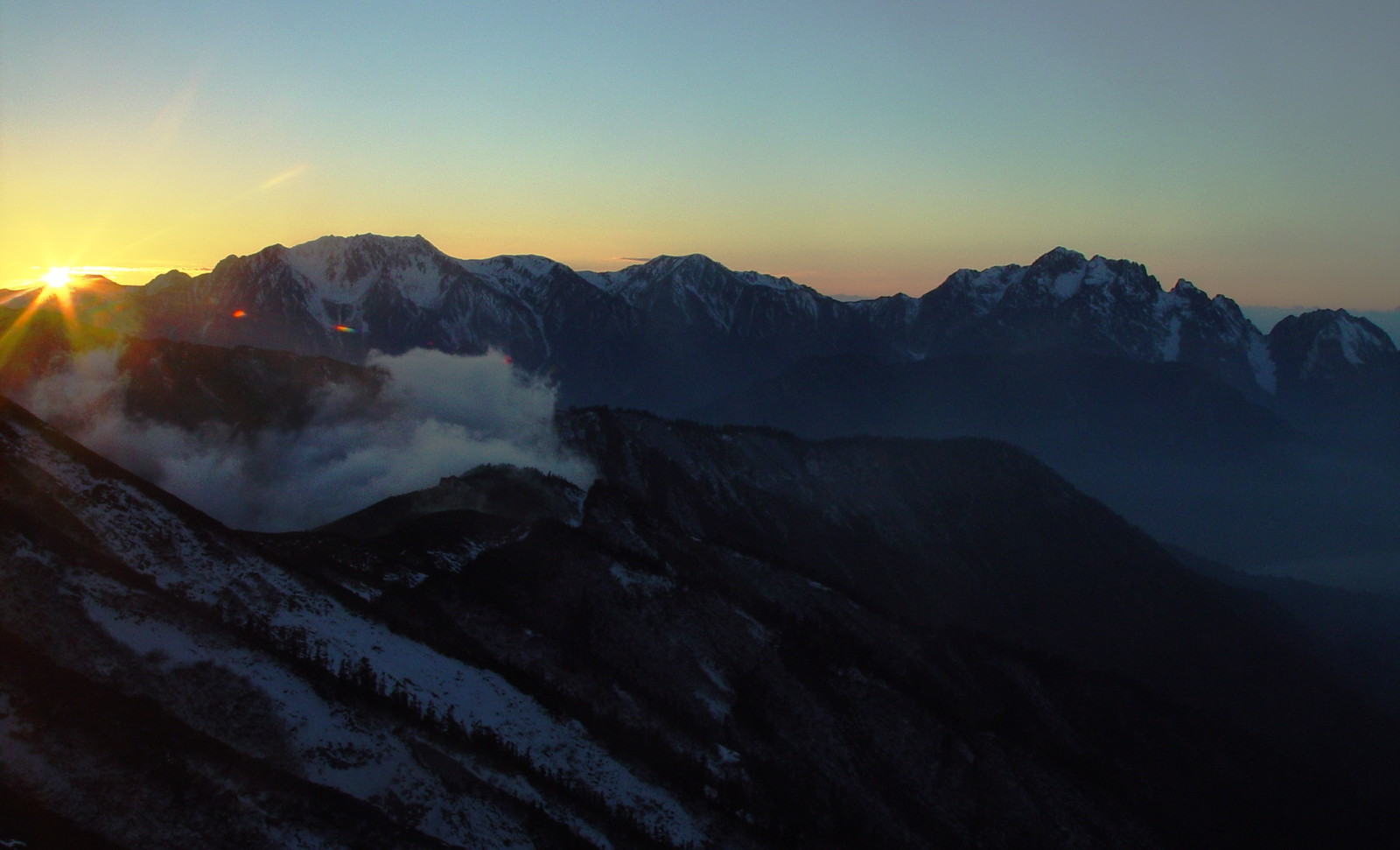
Mount Tate, Mount Bessan and Mount Tsurugi seen from Mount Kashimayari at sunset

Image	Mountain	Elevation	Distance and direction from the Top	Note
	Mount Tsurugi 剱岳	2,999 m (9,839 ft)	5.3 km (3.3 mi); North	100 Japanese Mountains
	Mount Bessan 別山	2,880 m (9,449 ft)	2.4 km (1.5 mi); North	
	Mount Tate 立山	3,015 m (9,892 ft)	0 km (0.0 mi)	100 Famous Japanese Mountains the tallest mountain in Toyama Prefecture
	Mount Ryūō 龍王岳	2,872 m (9,423 ft)	1.7 km (1.1 mi); Southwest	
	Mount Harinoki 針ノ木岳	2,820.60 m (9,254 ft)	7.2 km (4.5 mi); Southeast	200 Japanese Mountains
	Mount Akaushi 赤牛岳	2,864.23 m (9,397 ft)	12.8 km (8.0 mi); South	200 Japanese Mountains
	Mount Yakushi 薬師岳	2,926.01 m (9,600 ft)	13.7 km (8.5 mi); Southwest	100 Japanese Mountains

=== Rivers ===
Mount Tate is the source of two rivers, both flowing to the Sea of Japan.

- Hayatsuki River
- Tsurugi Sawa, tributaries of the Kurobe River

== Scenery of Tateyama ==
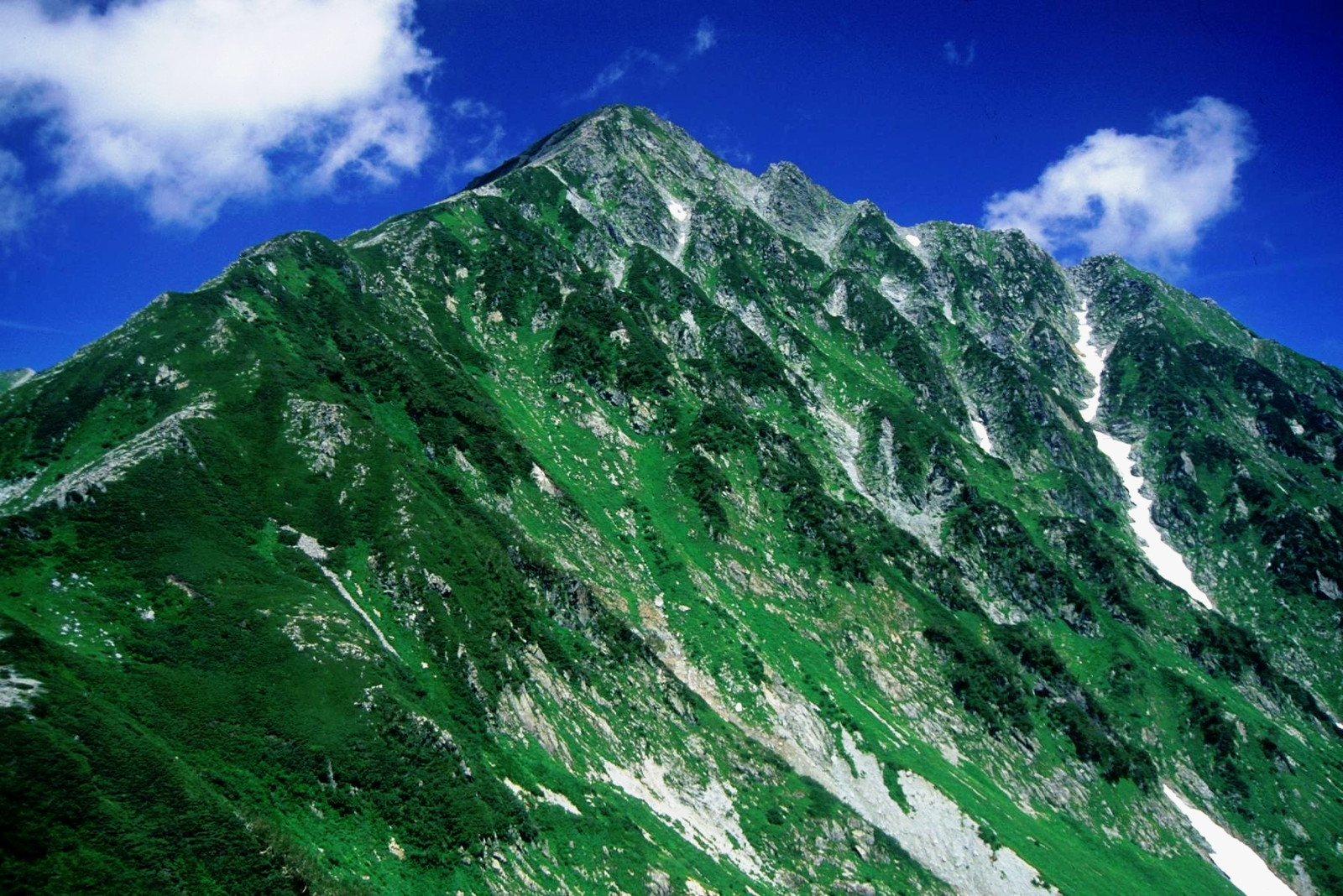
Tateyama from Higashi-Ichinokoshi

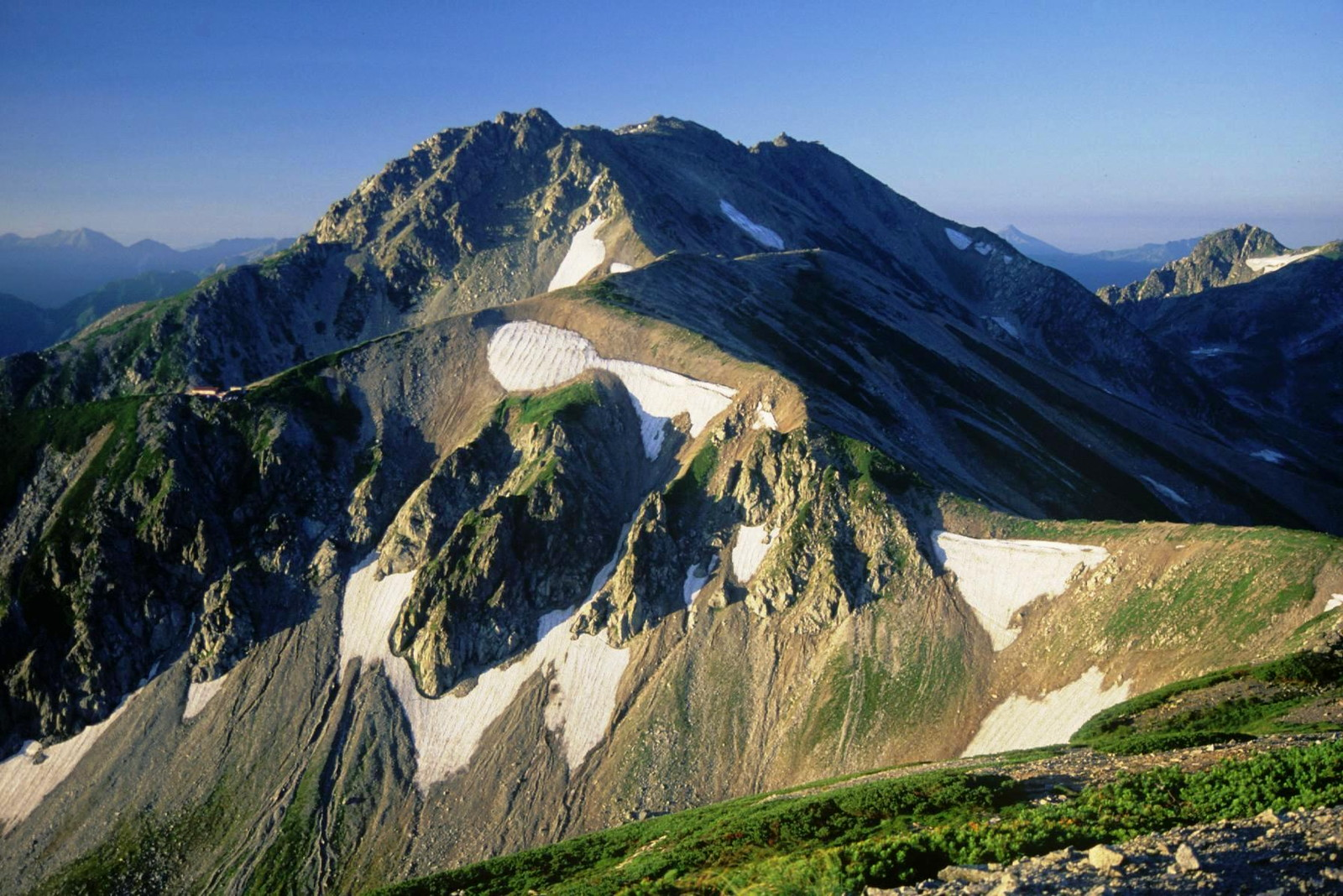
Tateyama from Mount Bessan

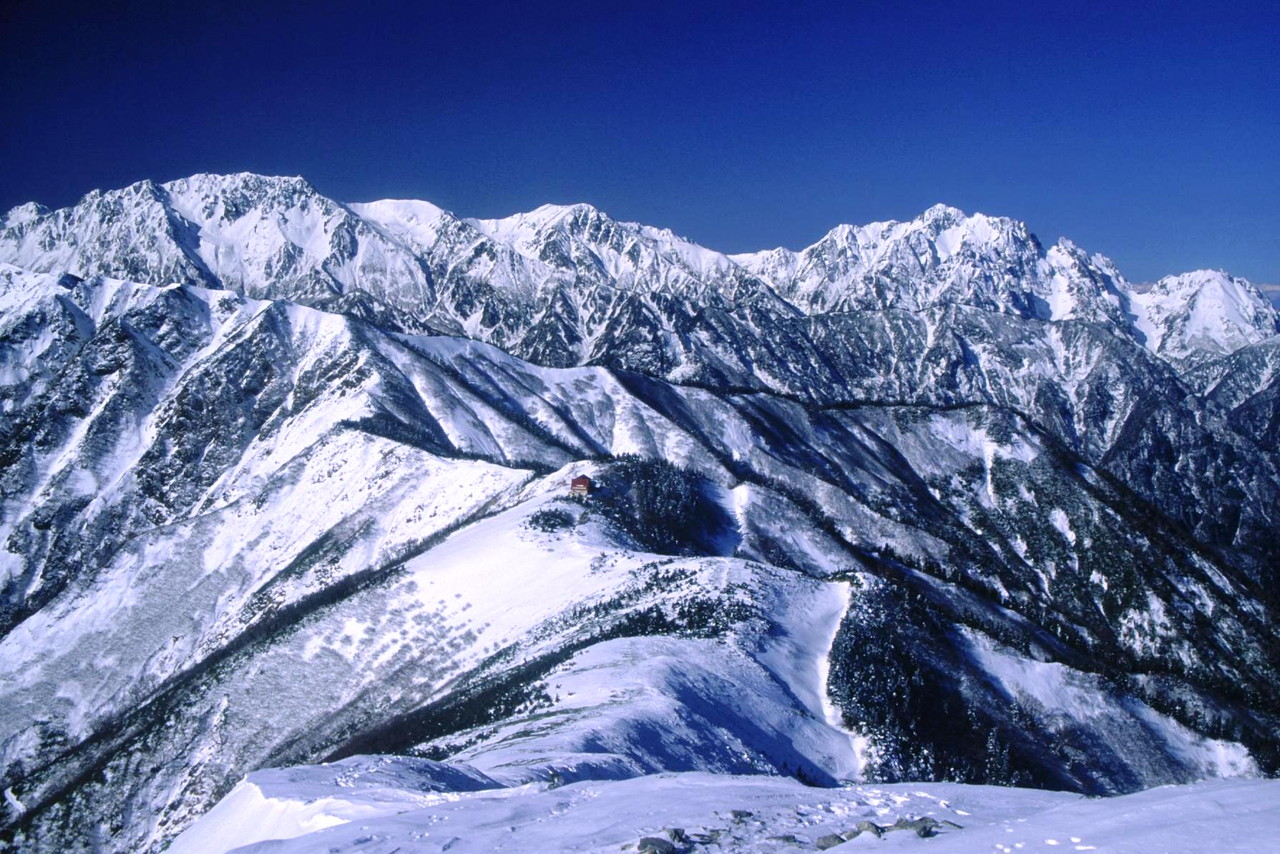
Tateyama and Mount Tsurugi from Mount Jii

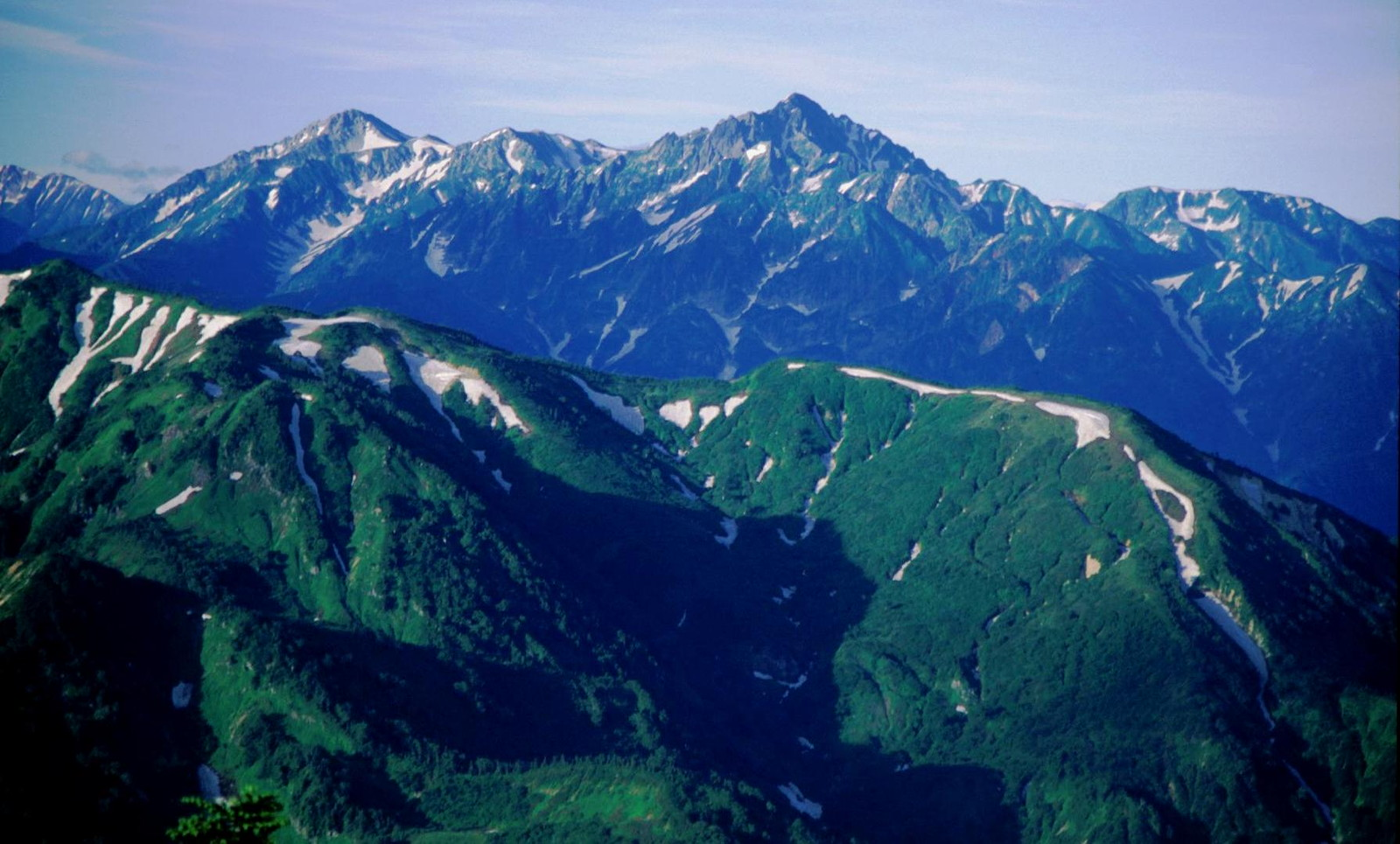
Tateyama and Mount Tsurugi from Mount Asahi

== See also ==
- Chūbu-Sangaku National Park
- Japanese Alps
- List of mountains and hills of Japan by height
- List of three-thousanders in Japan
- Tateyama Kurobe Alpine Route
- Tateyama Sabō Erosion Control Works Service Train
- Tateyama, Toyama
- Tateyama Station (Toyama)
- Murodō Station
- Kurobe Dam
- Midagahara
- Murodō
- Tourism in Japan
