= Matsuzawa Teiitsu =

Japanese businessman

- 松澤 貞逸

Personal details
- Born: July 8, 1889 Hakuba, Nagano Prefecture, Japan
- Died: 1926 (aged 36–37) Ōmachi, Nagano Prefecture, Japan

Matsuzawa Teiitsu (Japanese: 松澤 貞逸; 1889–1926) was a Japanese businessman and innkeeper. He was also a mountaineer and played a role in the popularization of skiing in Japan.

== Biography ==
His father was Matsuzawa Naojirō (松澤 直次郎), owner of the Yamaki Ryokan (ヤマキ旅館), an inn located near the current site of Hakuba Station. When Naojirō suddenly died in 1897, Matsuzawa Teiitsu inherited the family estate and became the nominal manager of the inn at the age of 8.

In 1900, Matsuzawa climbed to the peak of Mount Shirouma, sparking a lifelong interest in mountaineering. In 1905, at the age of 16, he acquired a lease on a small stone shelter near the peak of the mountain originally used by Army surveyors. The next year, he converted the shelter into the first commercial mountain hut in Japan — the Hakuba Sansō. The facility was expanded considerably in 1915.

In 1916, Matsuzawa opened a second mountain hut the head of the Hakuba Snowfield in an effort to attract skiers. In 1922, he established the Hokujō Automobile Co. (北城自動車合資会社), a local taxi service featuring a fleet of two Ford Model Ts. Later, Matsuzawa's Hokujō Village Ski Club (北城村スキークラブ) was founded as one of Japan's first ski clubs.

In 1926, Matsuzawa died in a car crash.

Today, the annual Teiitsu Festival (貞逸祭, Teiitsu-matsuri) marks the beginning of climbing season on Mount Shirouma.

== See also ==
- Hakubadake Chōjō Shukusha
- Hakuba Yari Onsen
