= Shibazaki Yoshitarō =

- 柴崎 芳太郎

Personal details
- Born: 1876 Ōishida, Yamagata Prefecture, Japan
- Died: 1938 (aged 61–62) Japan

Shibazaki Yoshitarō (Japanese: 柴崎 芳太郎; 1876–1938) was a Japanese Army surveyor and mountaineer.

== Biography ==
Shibazaki was born in 1876. Aspiring to a military career, he enlisted in the Imperial Japanese Army. In 1896, he was assigned to the Taiwan garrison. In 1903, he transferred to the Land Survey Department (陸地測量部) of the Army General Staff Office and was hired as a land surveyor.

In 1906, Shibazaki received a medal for participation in the Russo-Japanese War.

After learning the art of triangulation in the mountains of central Japan, Shibazaki was tasked with completing a network of trigonometrical points across the peaks surrounding 2,999 m (9,839 ft) Mount Tsurugi. He conducted a preliminary reconnaissance of the mountain in 1906. In 1907, accompanied by mountain guide Uji Chōjirō and assistant Ikuta Nobu, he successfully reached the peak of Mount Tsurugi — previously considered one of the last unclimbed mountains in Japan.

During the team's surveying work at the summit, a rusty iron blade and the copper head of a khakkhara were discovered. These artifacts were later dated to the 8th or 9th century, indicating that yamabushi had reached the peak roughly 1000 years before. Long kept by the Shibasaki family, the blade and khakkhara are now housed at the Tateyama Museum in Tateyama.

Shibazaki later carried out topographical surveys in Taiwan, Manchuria, and Siberia. He retired in 1932 and died in 1938 after contracting pneumonia.
