= Murodō =

Volcanic Plateau in Japan

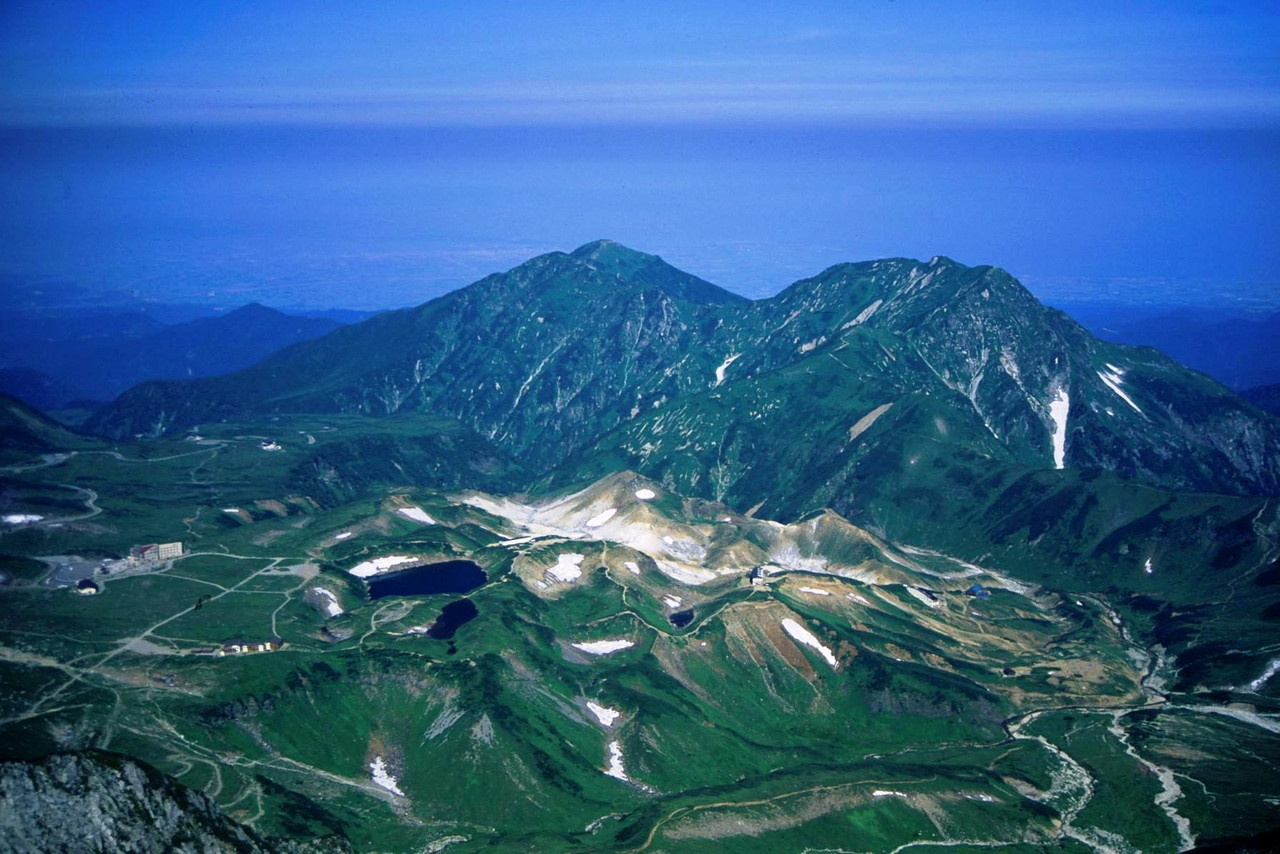
Murodo plateau seen from Mount Tate

Murodō (室堂, Muro-do; IPA: [Murodo]) is a volcanic plateau located near Tateyama in Toyama Prefecture, central Honshu, in Japan.

Murodō is located on the Tateyama Kurobe Alpine Route. Murodō's is located near Mount Tate, Mount Tsurugi and other peaks. Murodō is the highest point on the Tateyama Kurobe Alpine Route, reaching 2,450 meters (8,038 feet) above sea level.

== Geography ==
Murodō was formed from maar. The Mikuriga-ike pond and the Midoriga-ike pond are near Murodō station.

== Gallery ==
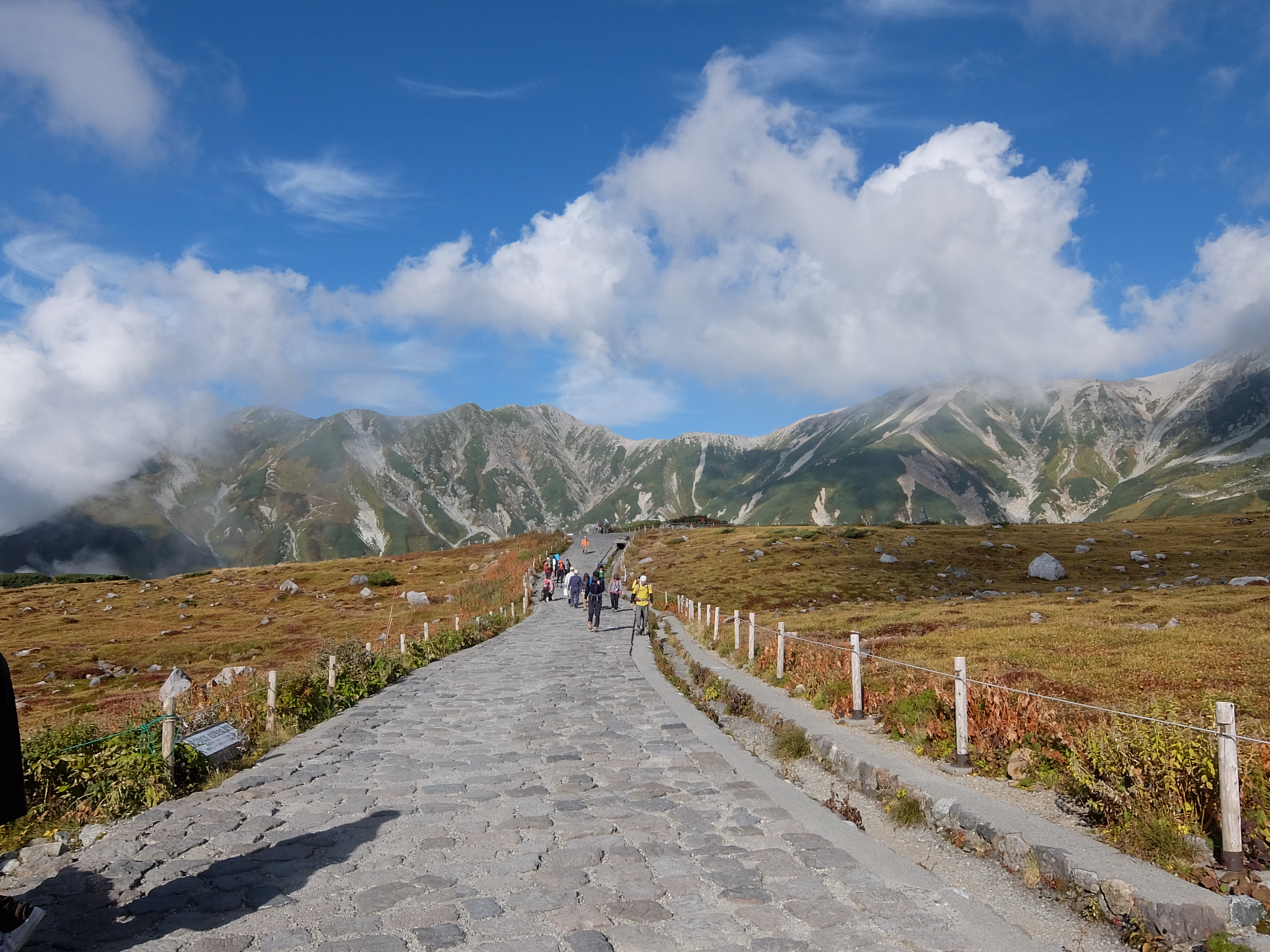
The trail from Murodo St. to Murodo plateau

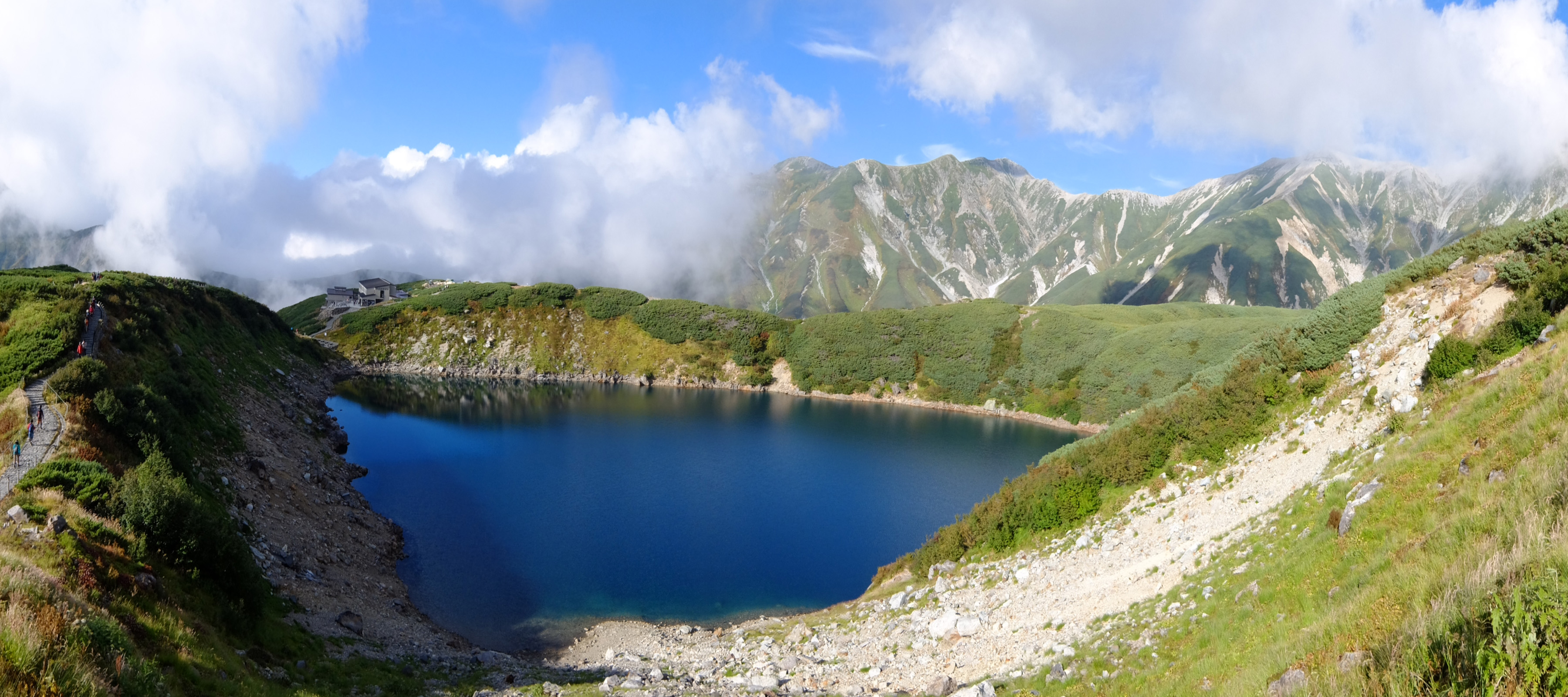
Mikuriga-ike pond

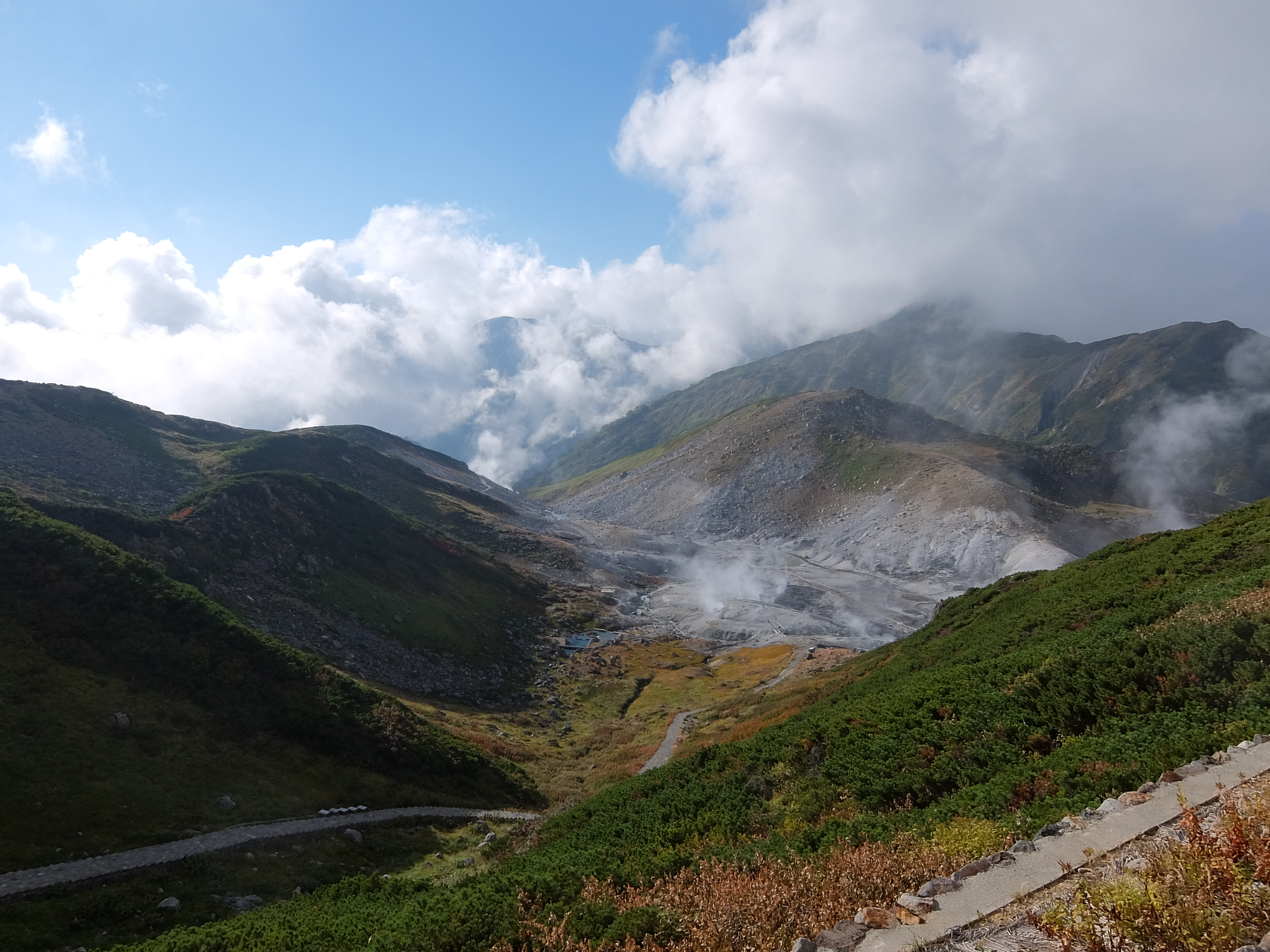
Jigokudani seen from Murodo

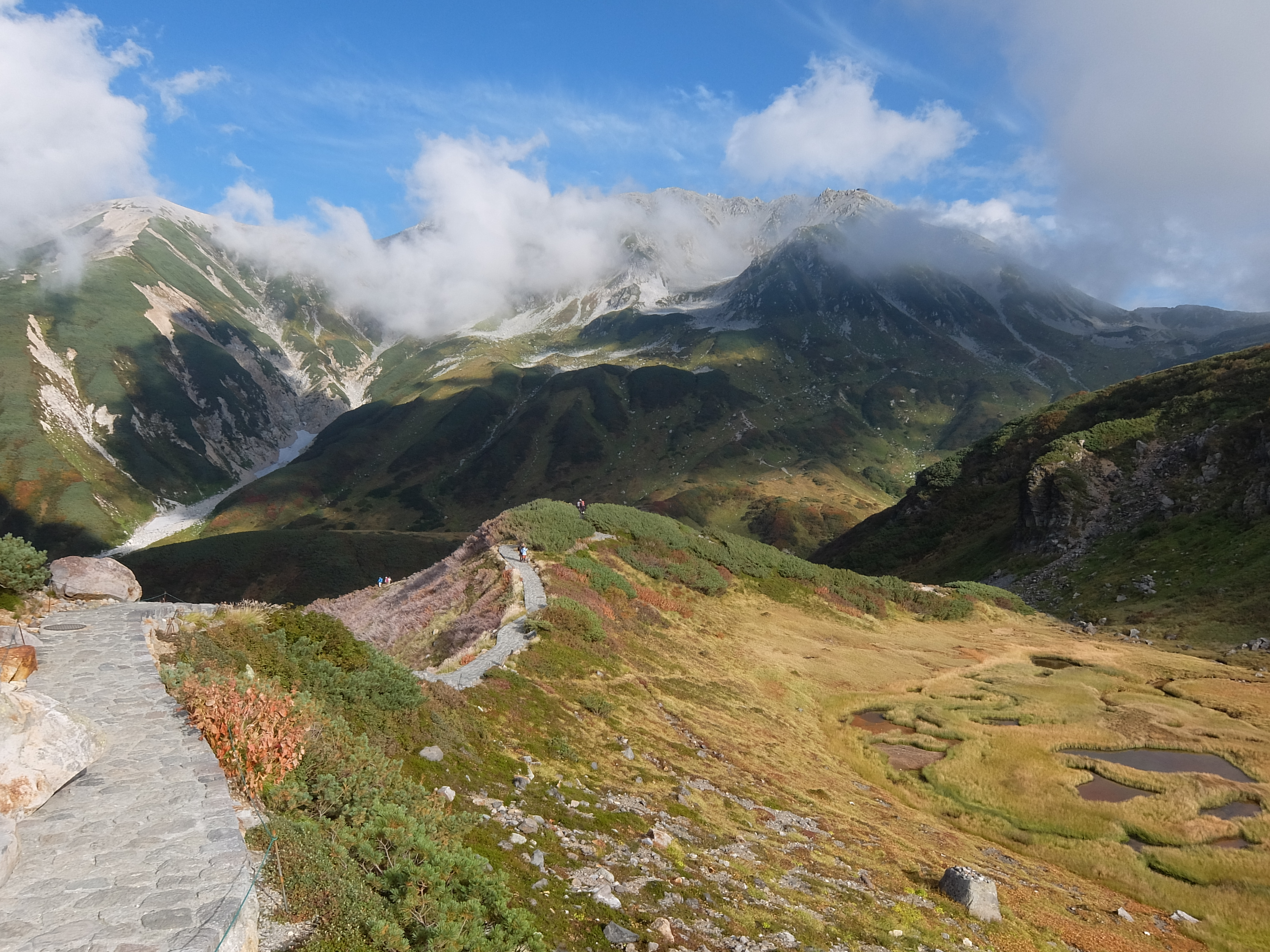
The trail from Murodo plateau to Raityo-so (Hotel)

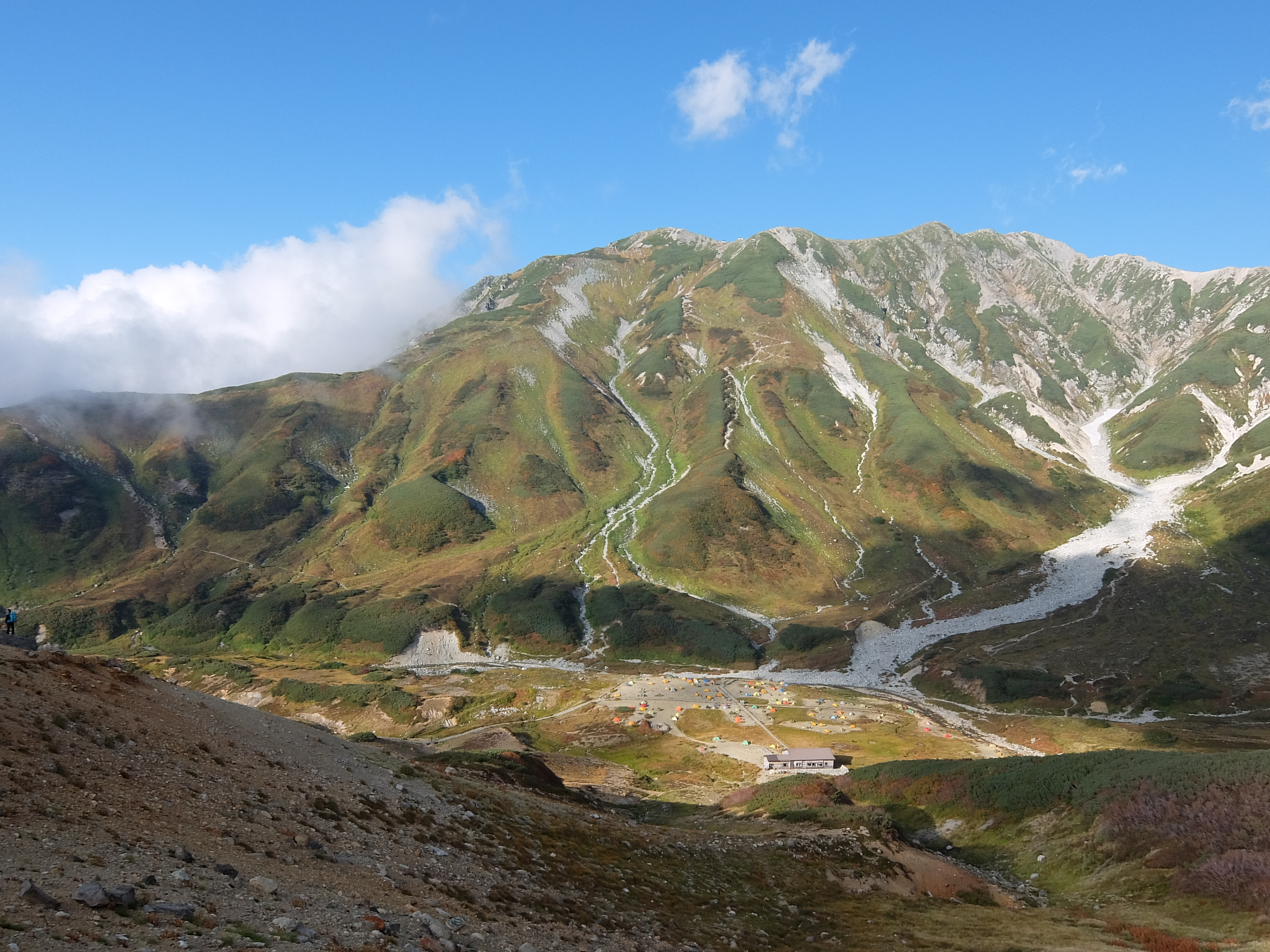
Raityozawa Camp Site

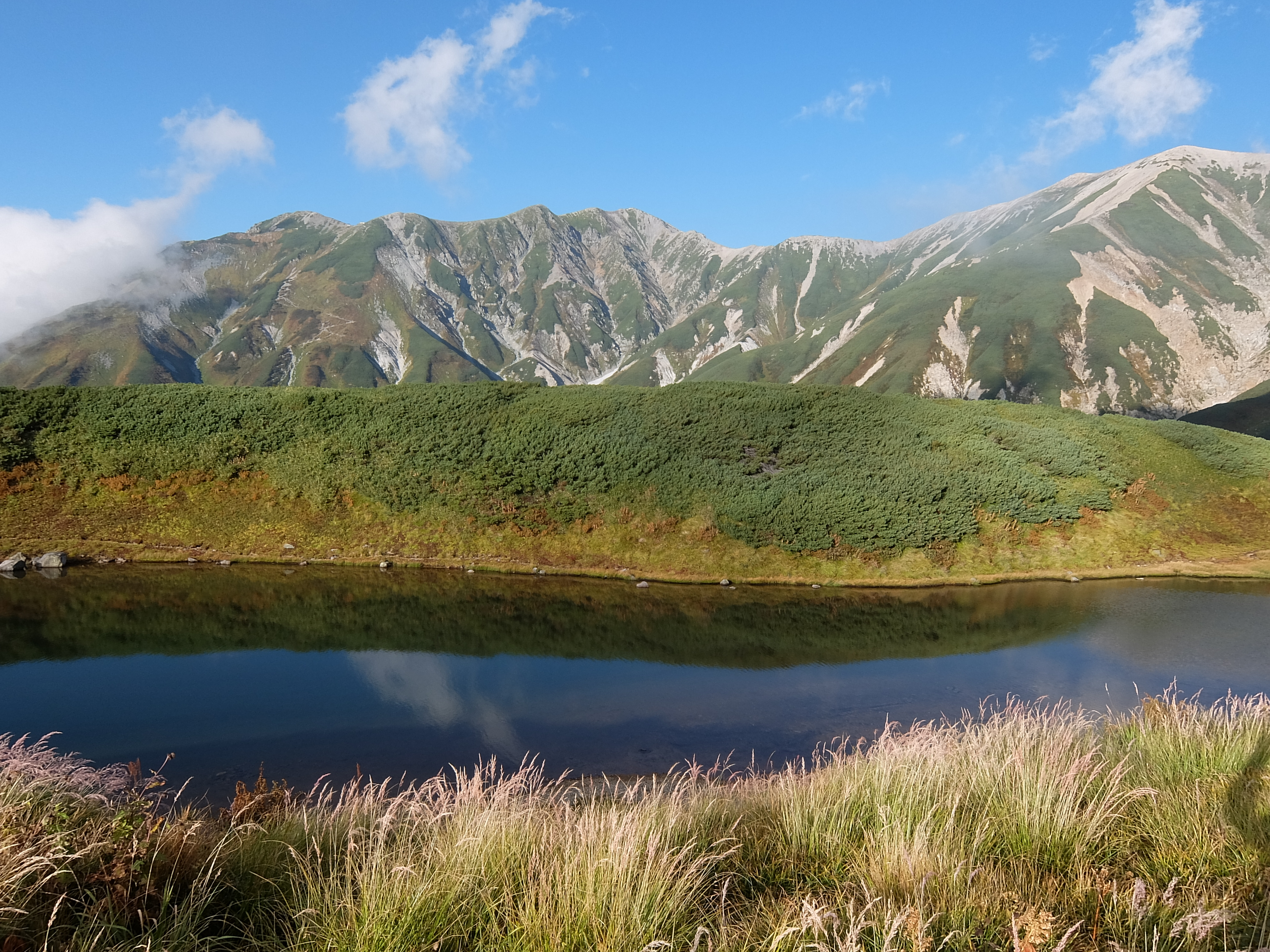
Midoriga-ike pond

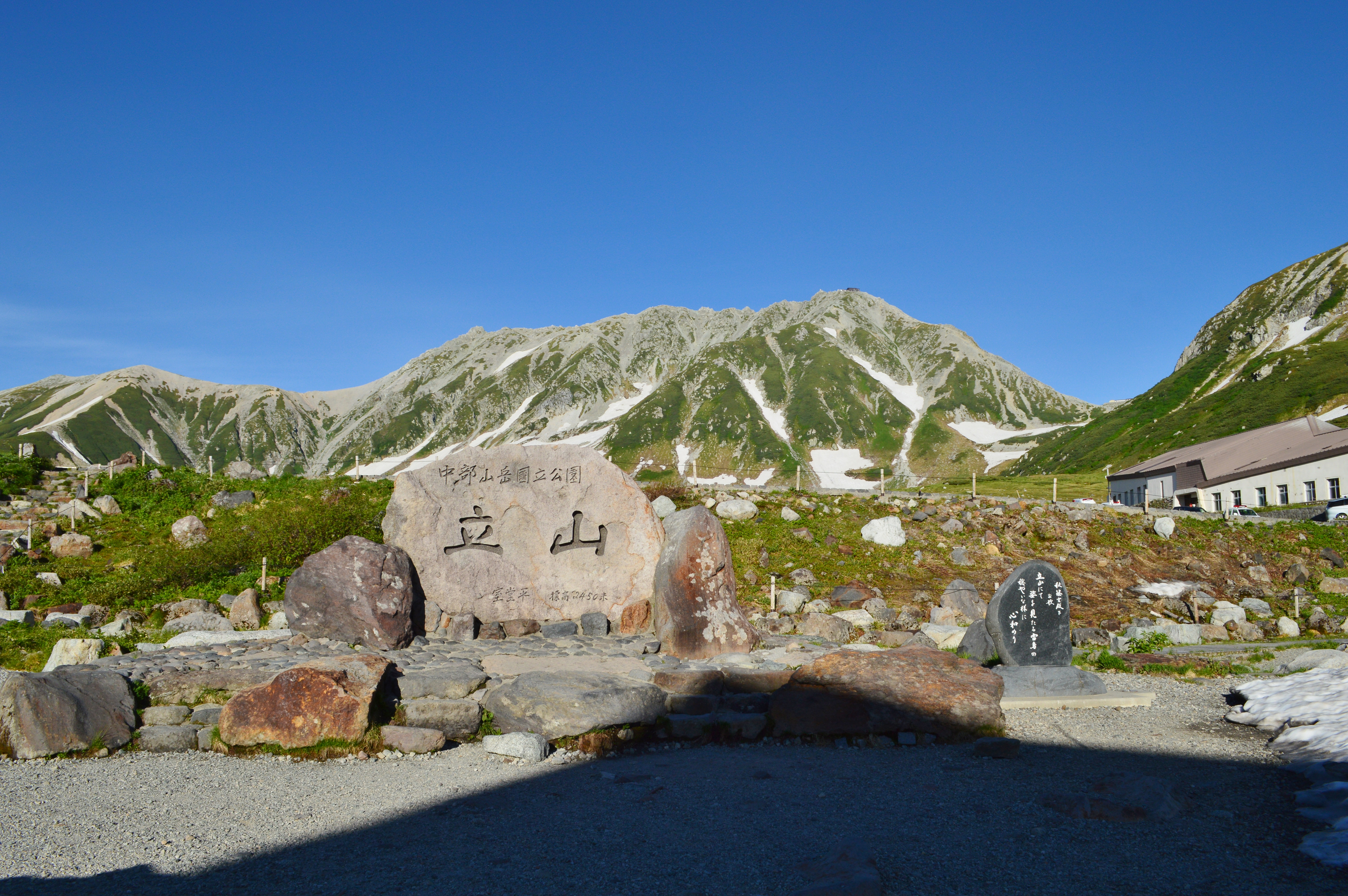
Murodo St. near by the stone monument.

== See also ==
- Murodō Station
- Mount Tate
- Chūbu-Sangaku National Park
- Tateyama Kurobe Alpine Route
