= Fudōdō Site =

Jōmon period archaeological site in Asahi, Hokuriku, Japan

- 不動堂遺跡 (Japanese)
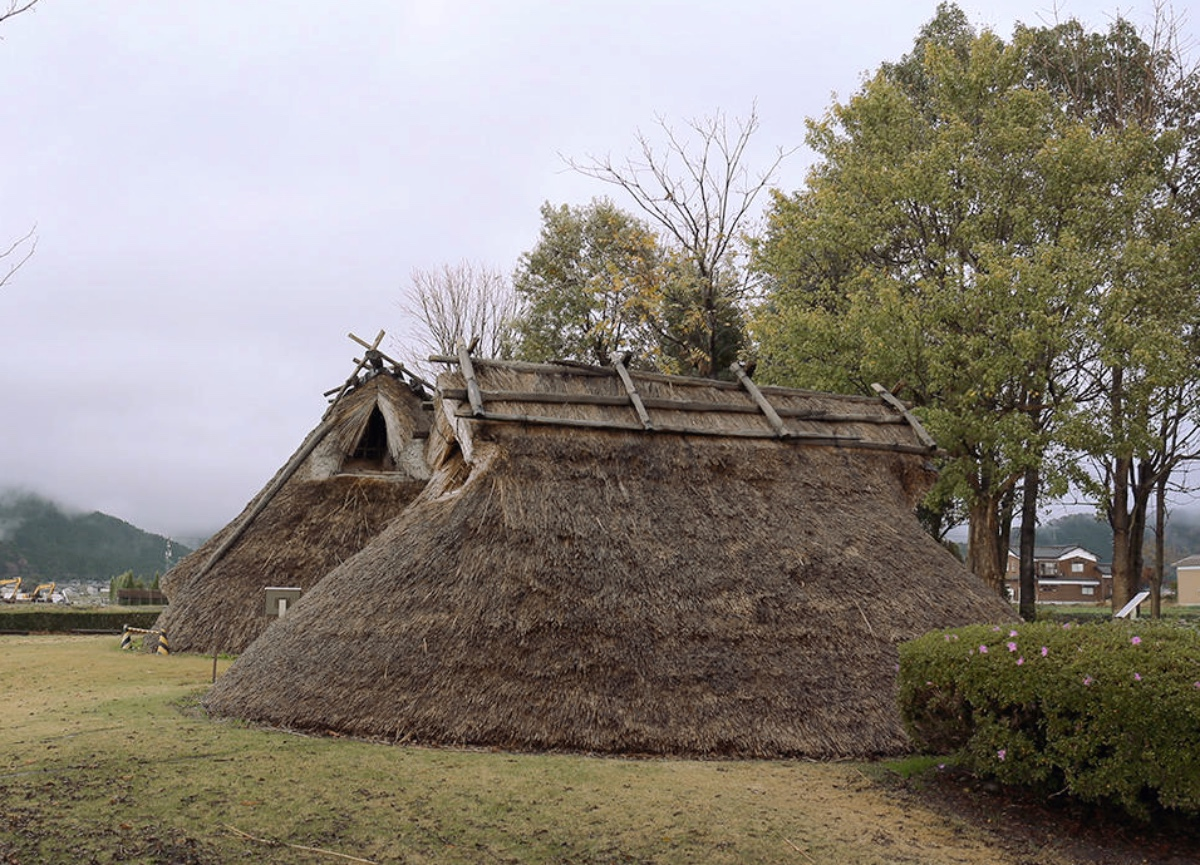
- Fudōdō Site with reconstructed pit dwellings

- Fudōdō Site Fudōdō Site (Japan)
- 36°55′15″N 137°33′13″E
- Type: settlement
- Periods: Jōmon period
- Location: Asahi, Toyama, Japan
- Region: Hokuriku region

Site notes
- Area: 9,000 m^{2} (97,000 sq ft)
- Public access: Yes (park)

The Fudōdō Site (不動堂遺跡, Fudōdō Iseki) is an archaeological site with the ruins of a middle Jōmon period (around 2500 BC) settlement in what is now part of the town of Asahi, Toyama Prefecture in the Hokuriku region of Japan. It was designated a National Historic Site of Japan in 1986.

== Overview ==
The Fudōdō site is located at the eastern margin of the Toyama Plain at the end of a raised alluvial fan on the right bank of the Kurobe River. In 1973, an archaeological excavation found the remnants of 21 pit dwellings as well as nine food storage pits and many artifacts such as fragments of Jōmon pottery and stone tools. Of especial interest was the central part of the ruins, which contained the foundations of a long oval structure measuring 17 meters east-to-west and eight meters north-to-south, making it one of the largest pit dwellings found in Japan. Two circular and two square stone-lined hearths were regularly arranged along the longitudinal axis. It is presumed that the building was not an ordinary residence, but served as a public structure, possibility for ceremonial purposes.

The pottery included "flame-style" pottery from the Niigata region, and "tree-style" pottery from the Tohoku region, indicating that the community had long distance trade. Some of these artifacts, along with finds from other sites in the region, are displayed at the Maibun-kan (まいぶんKAN) museum on the east side of the site. The site is now an archaeological park, with several reconstructed pit dwellings, and is open to the public. It is located about 15 minutes by car from Tomari Station on the JR West Hokuriku Main Line.

== See also ==
- List of Historic Sites of Japan (Toyama)
