= Hida Mountains =

Mountain range in the northern part of the Japanese alps

Coordinates: 36°30′N 137°36′E

Hida Mountains (飛騨山脈)
- Northern Alps (北アルプス)
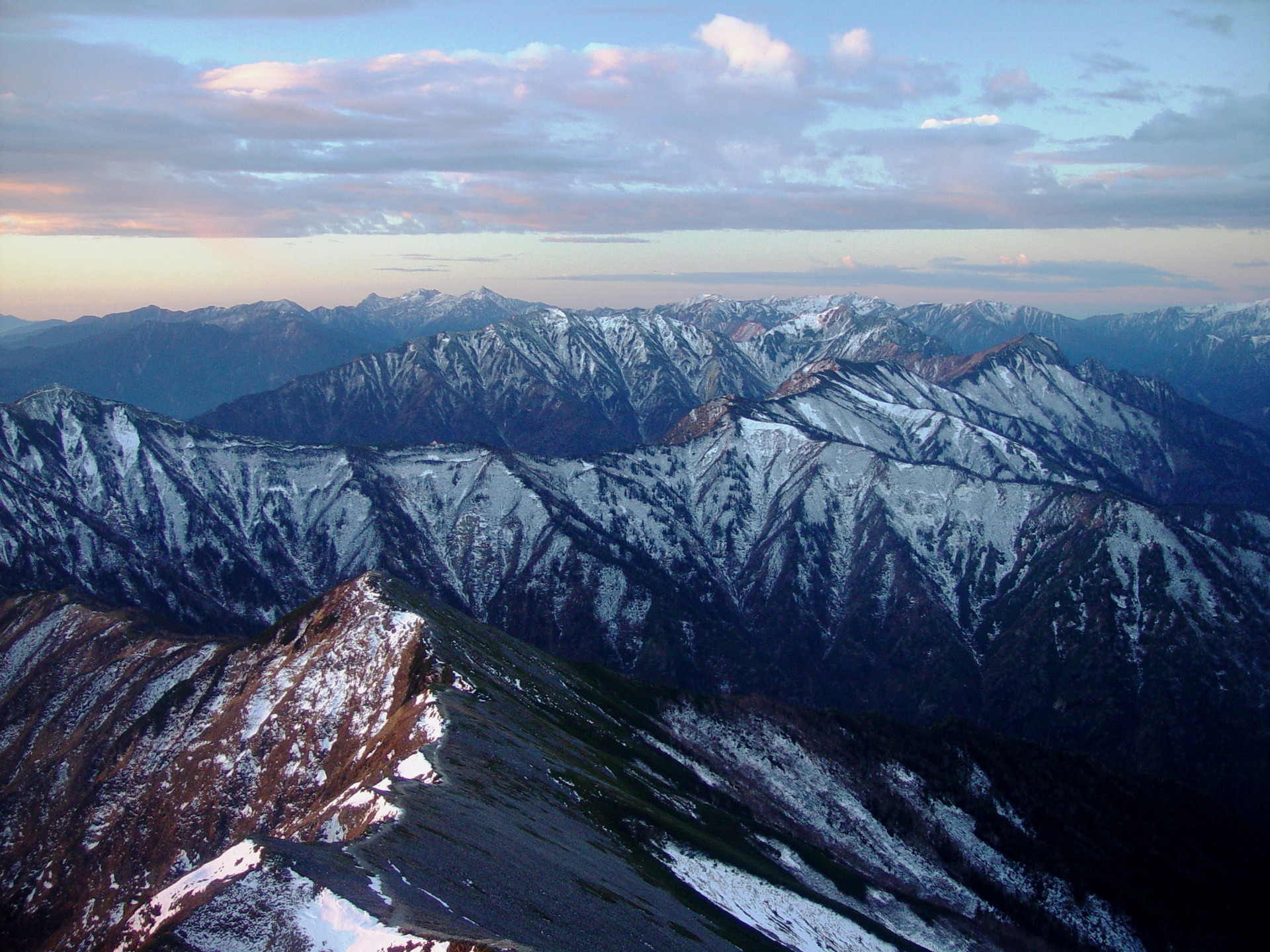
- A view from Mount Kashimayari

Highest point
- Peak: Mount Hotaka, Kiso District, Nagano Prefecture
- Elevation: 3,190 m (10,470 ft)

Dimensions
- Length: 105 km (65 mi)
- Width: 25 km (16 mi)

Geography
- Country: Japan
- Prefectures: Niigata; Toyama; Nagano; Gifu

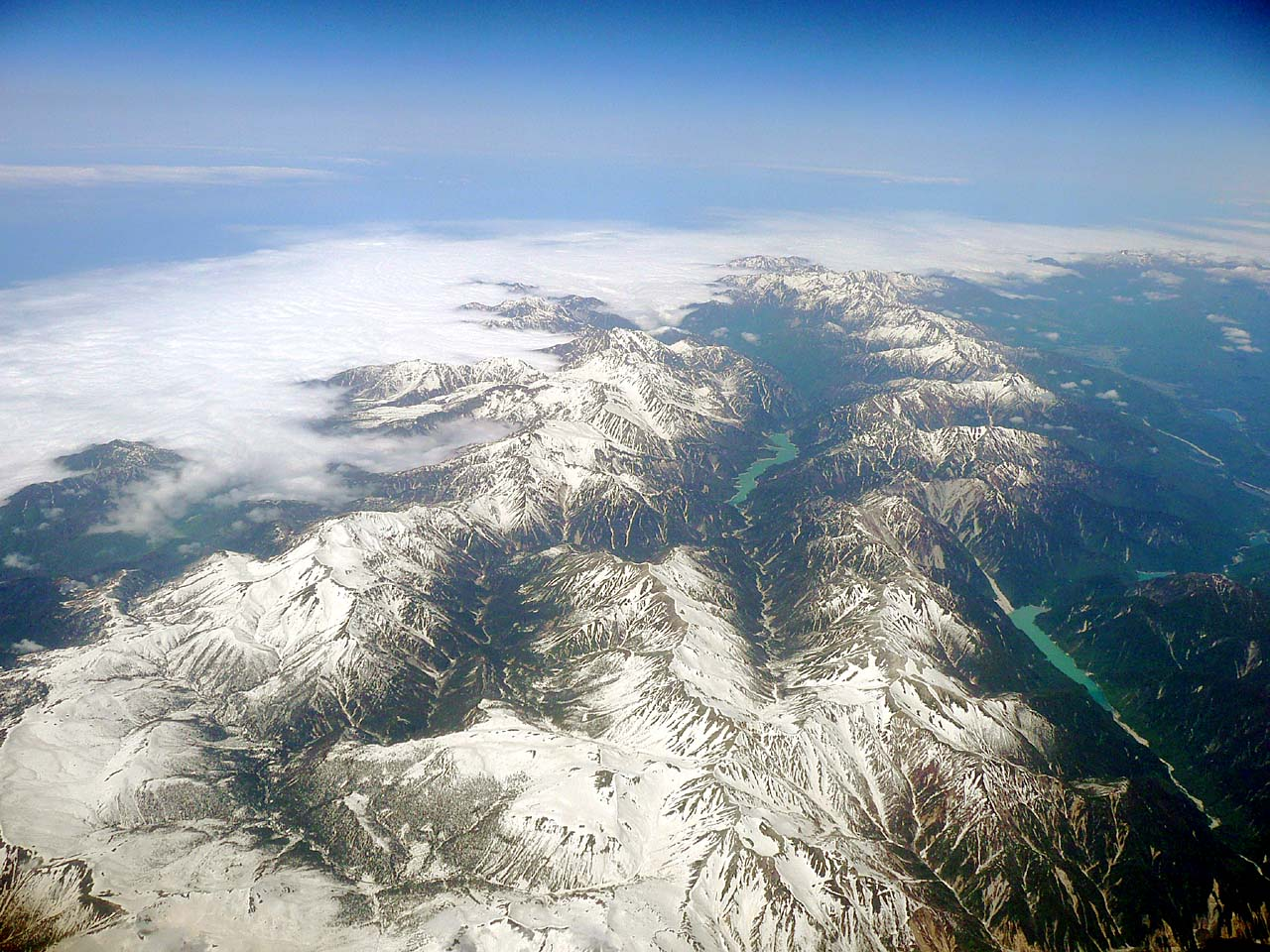
One of the sources of the river Kurobe in the Hida Mountains

The Hida Mountains (飛騨山脈, Hida Sanmyaku), or Northern Alps (北アルプス, Kita Arupusu), is a Japanese mountain range which stretches through Nagano, Toyama and Gifu prefectures. A small portion of the mountains also reach into Niigata Prefecture. William Gowland coined the phrase "Japanese Alps" during his time in Japan, but he was only referring to the Hida Mountains when he used that name. The Kiso and Akaishi mountains received the name in the ensuing years.

== Geography ==
The layout of the Hida Mountains forms a large Y-shape. The southern peaks are the lower portion of the Y-shape, with the northern peaks forming two parallel bands separated by a deep V-shaped valley. It is one of the steepest V-shaped valleys in Japan. The Kurobe Dam, Japan's largest dam, is an arch dam located in the Kurobe Valley in the central area of the mountains. The western arm of mountains, also known as the Tateyama Peaks (立山連峰 Tateyama Renpō), are dominated by Mount Tsurugi and Mount Tate. The eastern arm, known as the Ushiro Tateyama Peaks (後立山連峰 Ushiro Tateyama Renpō), are dominated by Mount Shirouma and Mount Kashimayari.

=== Glaciers ===
Although it was originally thought that no glaciers existed in East Asia south of Kamchatka, recent research has shown that three small glaciers still survive in Mount Tsurugi and Mount Tate owing to the extremely wet climate of the Hokuriku region allowing for very heavy snowfalls on the high peaks.

== Major peaks ==
- Mount Shirouma, 2,932 m (9,619 ft)
- Mount Kashimayari, 2,889 m (9,478 ft)
- Mount Tate, 3,015 m (9,892 ft)
- Mount Tsubakuro, 2,763 m (9,065 ft)
- Mount Tsurugi, 2,999 m (9,839 ft)
- Mount Noguchigoro, 2,924 m (9,593 ft)
- Mount Yari, 3,180 m (10,433 ft)
- Mount Hotaka, 3,190 m (10,466 ft)
- Mount Norikura, 3,026 m (9,928 ft)

== Gallery ==
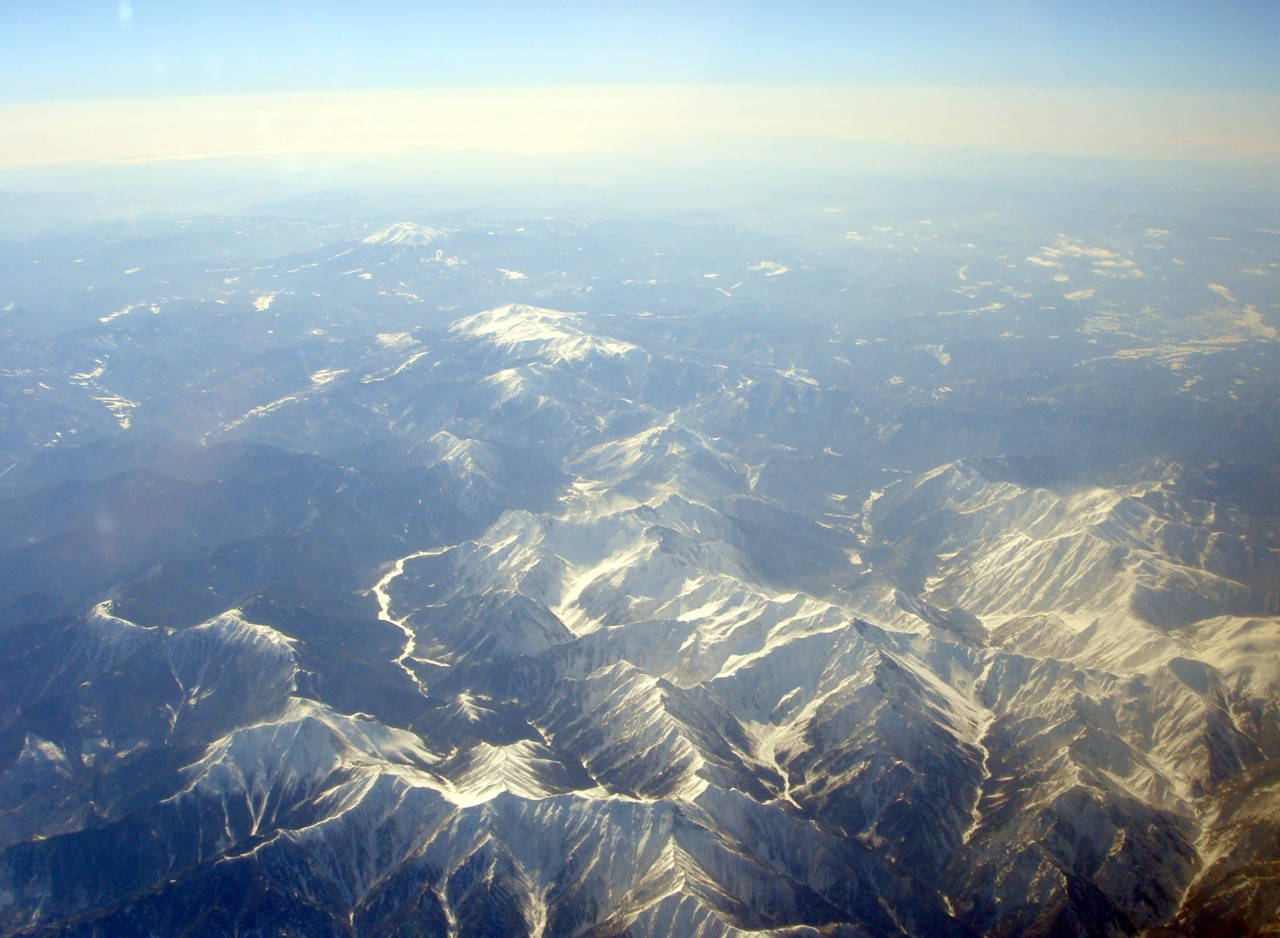
South half part of Hida Mountains

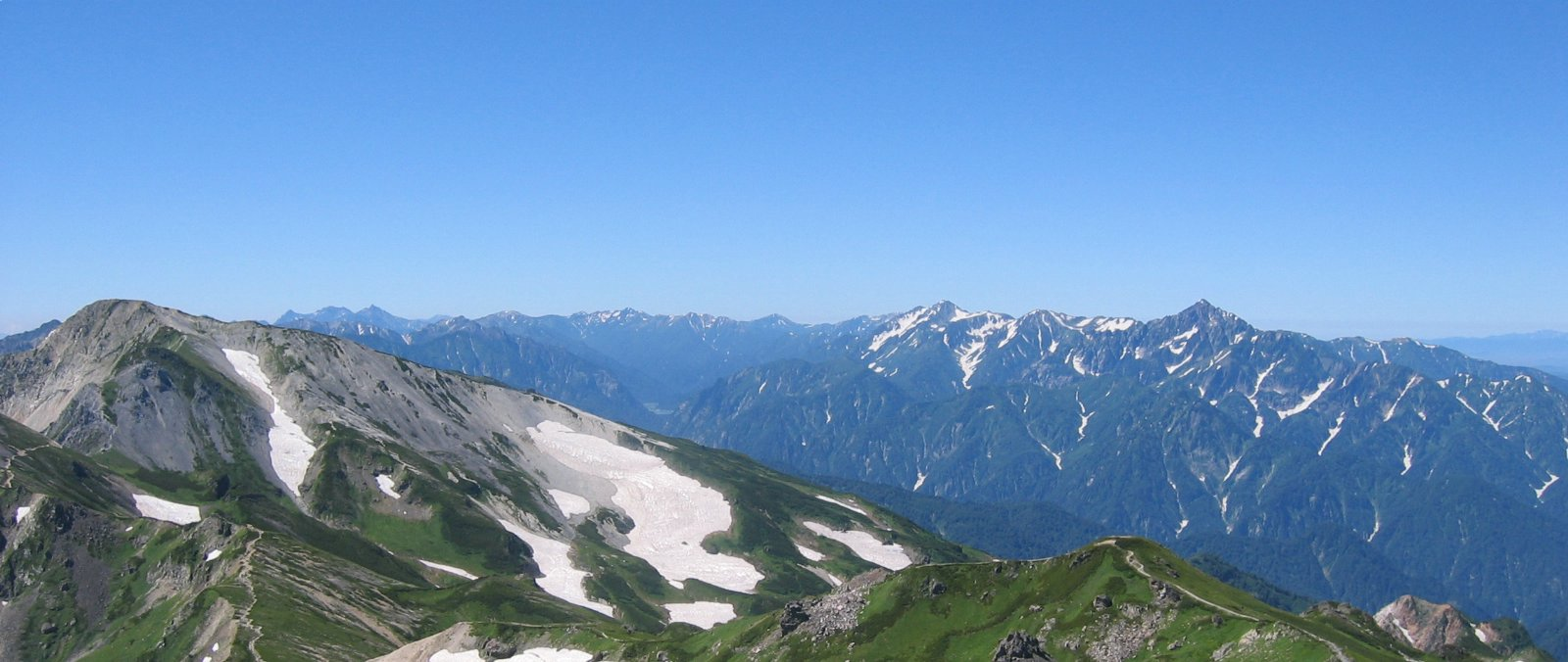
Mount Tateyama

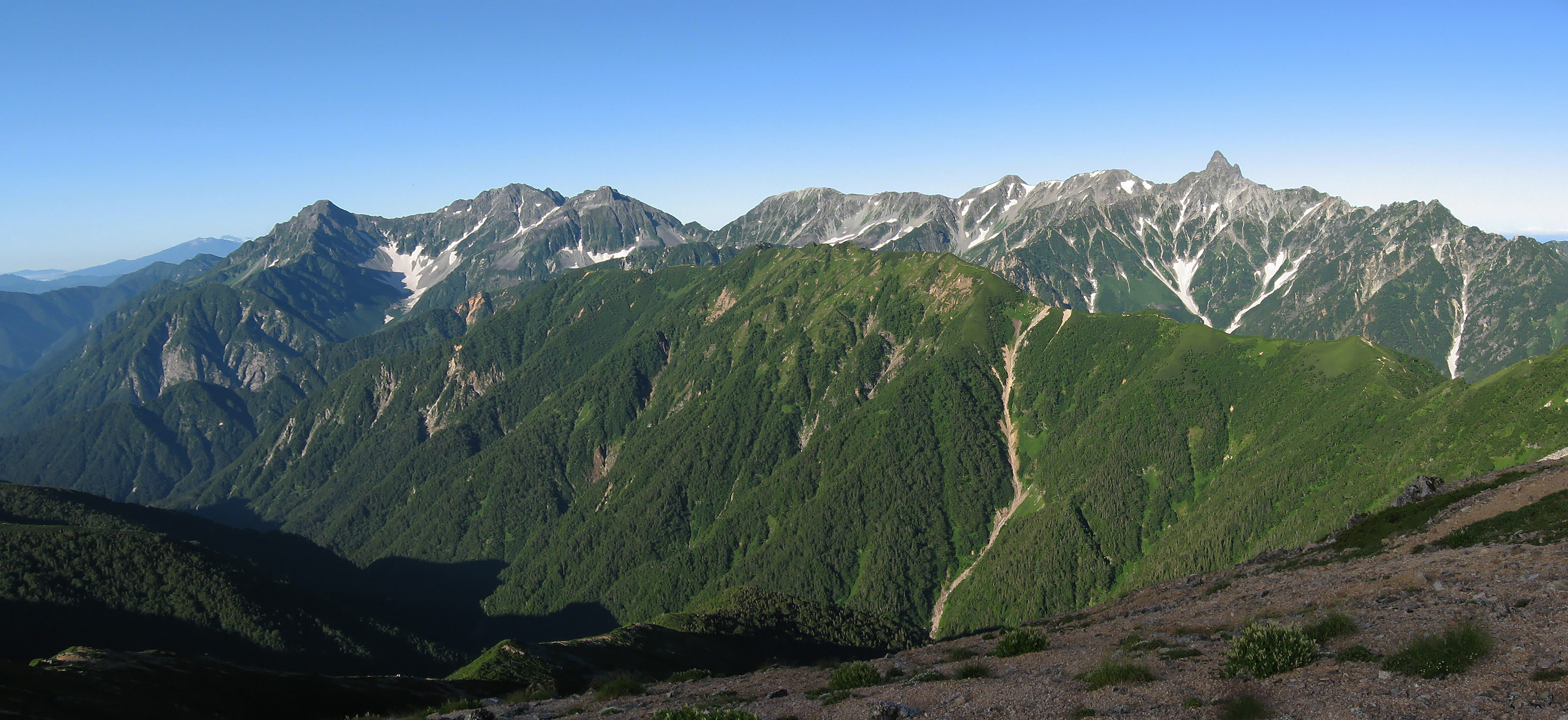
Mount Yari and Mount Hotaka

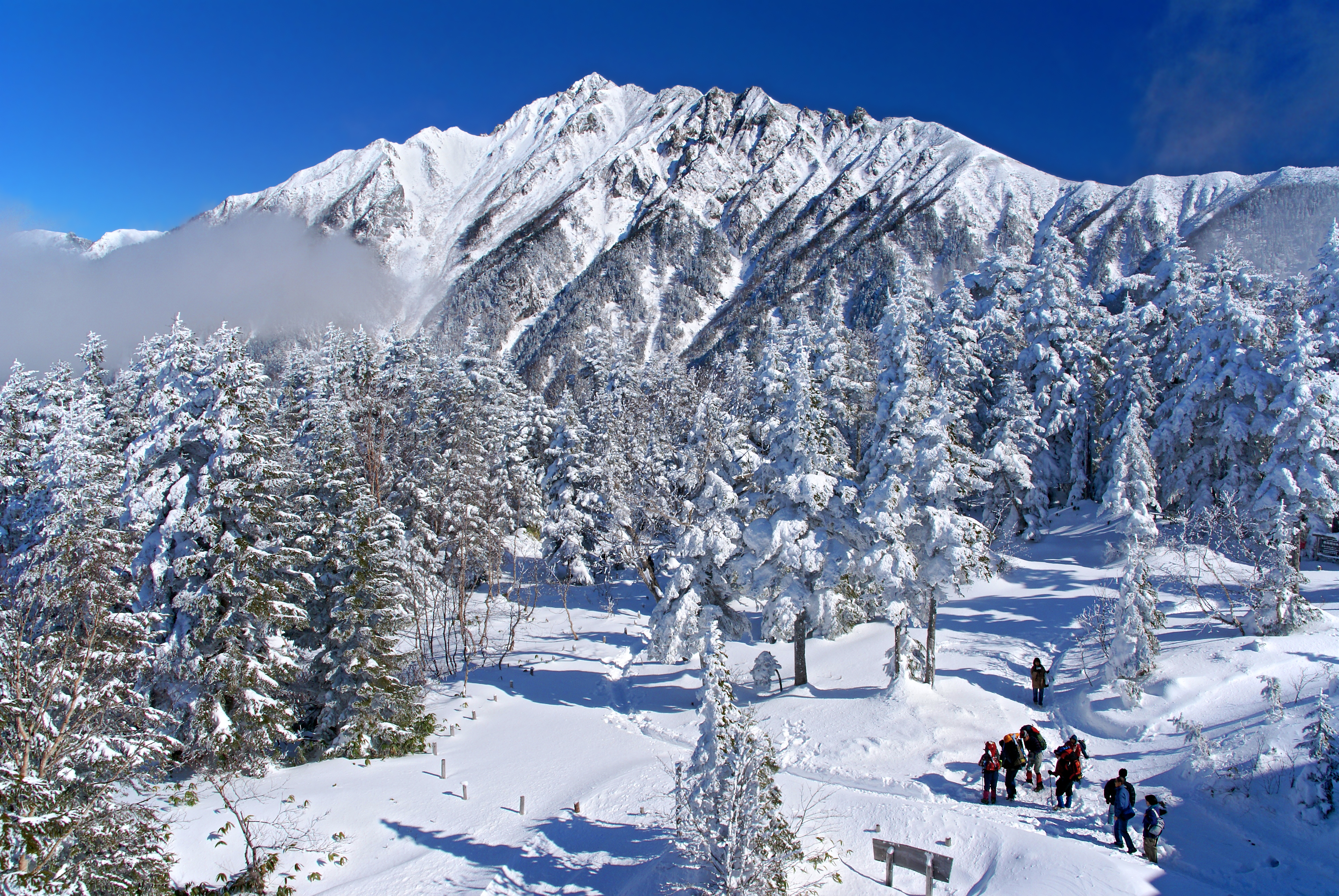
Mount Nishihotaka from Nishihotaka-guchi Station

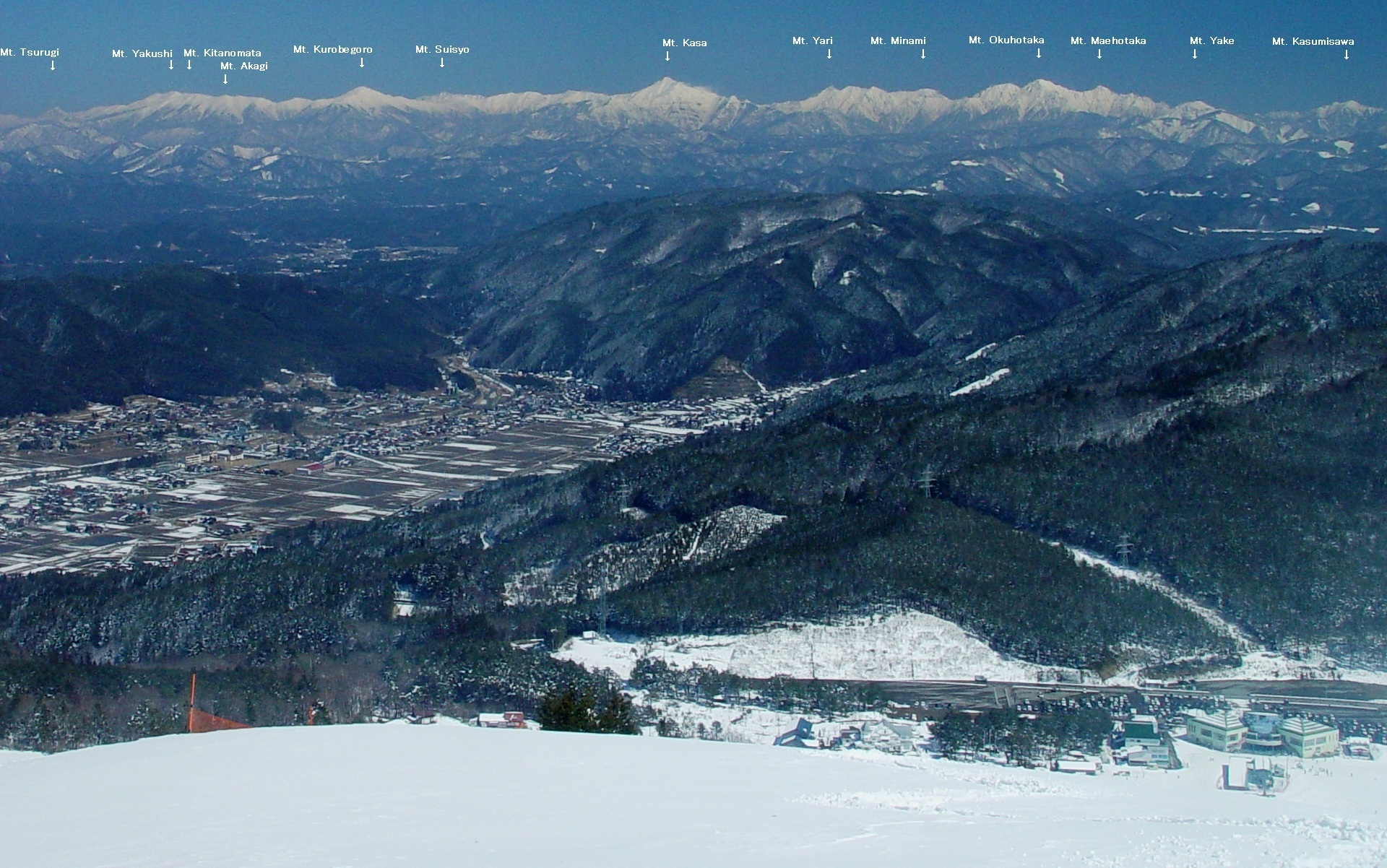
South half part seen from Mount Kurai

== See also ==
- Japanese Alps
  - Kiso Mountains (Central Alps)
  - Akaishi Mountains (Southern Alps)
- List of mountains in Japan
- 100 Famous Japanese Mountains
- Chūbu-Sangaku National Park
