= Mount Tsurugi (Toyama) =

Ultra-prominent mountain in western Japan

- 剱岳
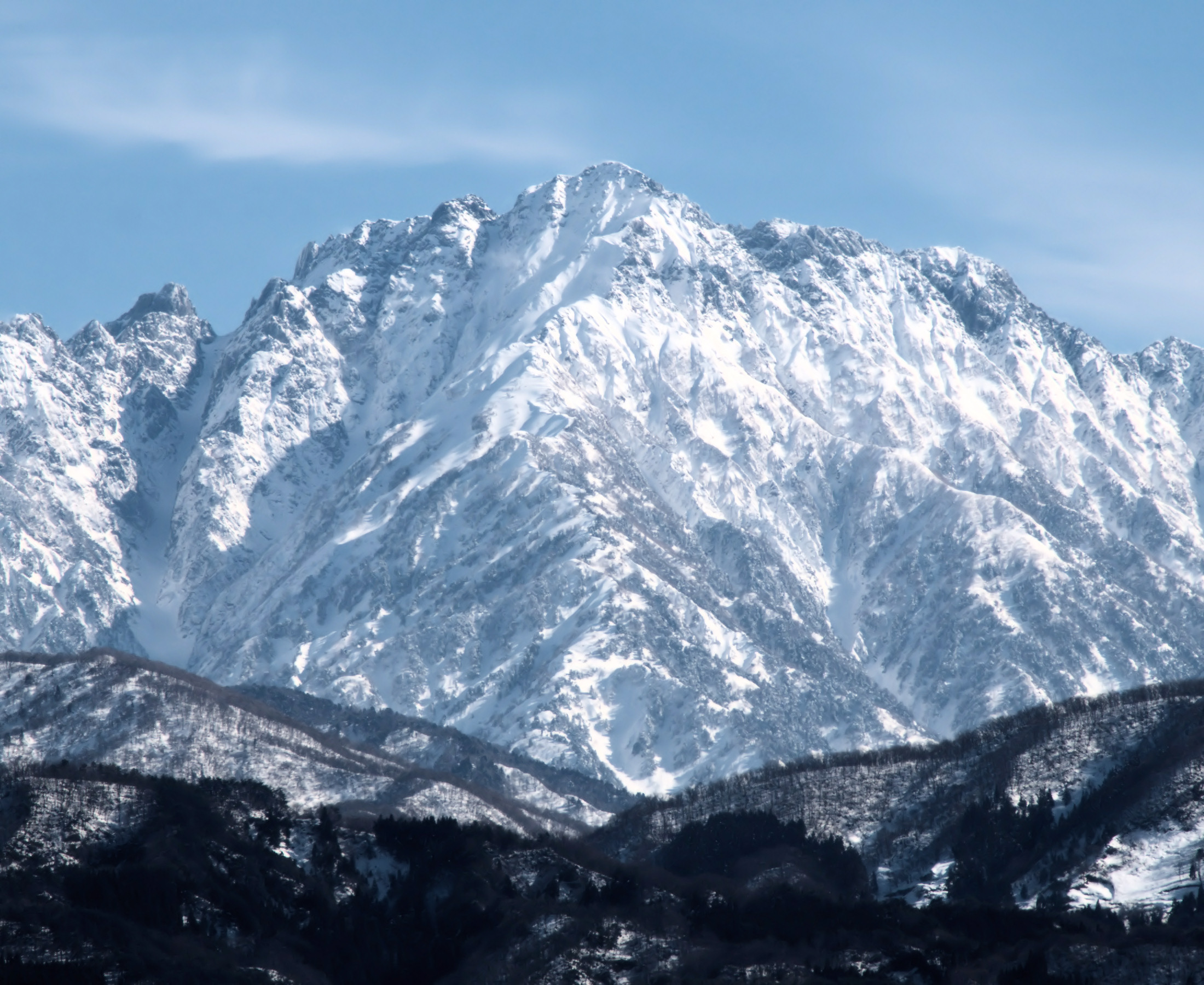
- View from the WNW

Highest point
- Elevation: 2,999 m (9,839 ft)
- Listing: List of mountains in Japan; 100 Famous Japanese Mountains
- Coordinates: 36°37′24″N 137°37′02″E

Naming
- English translation: Sword Mountain
- Language of name: Japanese

Geography
- Location within Japan
- Location: Toyama Prefecture, Japan
- Parent range: Hida Mountains

Climbing
- Easiest route: Hike

Mount Tsurugi (剱岳, Tsurugi-dake) is a mountain located in the eastern area of Toyama Prefecture, Japan. It is one of the tallest peaks in the Hida Mountains at 2,999 m (9,839 ft). It is one of the 100 Famous Japanese Mountains, and is called "the most dangerous mountain" climbable.

Tsurugi has a number of routes which approach world class long routes. It is recognised in Japan as "the" premiere mountaineering peak in winter. Although dangerous, its death toll is a small fraction of those who have died on Japan's much smaller, but more lethal Mount Tanigawa (Tanigawa-dake).

The first modern ascent of Mount Tsurugi was by Shibazaki Yoshitarō and Ikuta Nobu in 1907. However, upon reaching the summit, Ikuta discovered a rusted iron sword and staff. Upon later scientific investigation, the sword dated from the late Nara period to the early Heian period (approximately 800 AD), showing that shugenja had climbed Mount Tsurugi about 1,200 years ago.

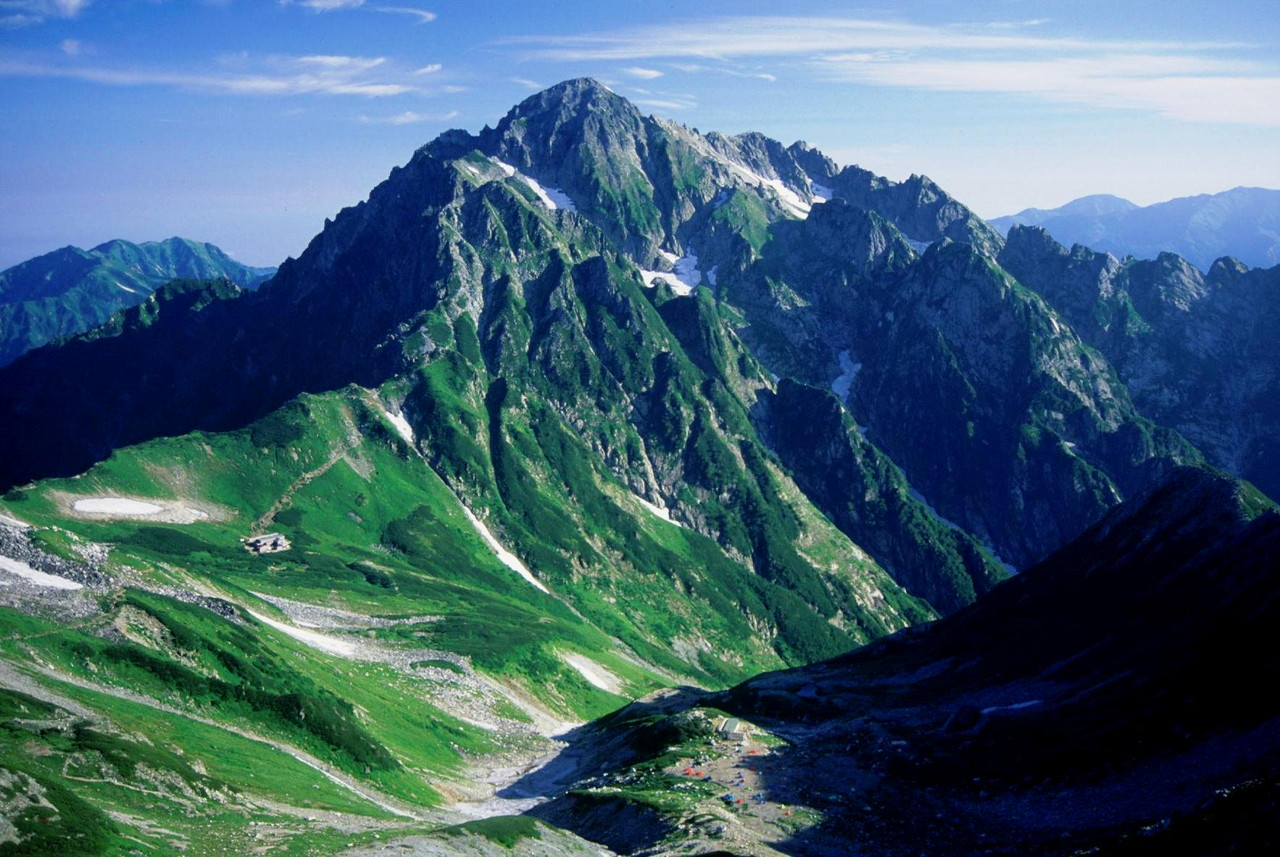
Mount Tsurugi seen from the due south. Taken from Mount Bessan.

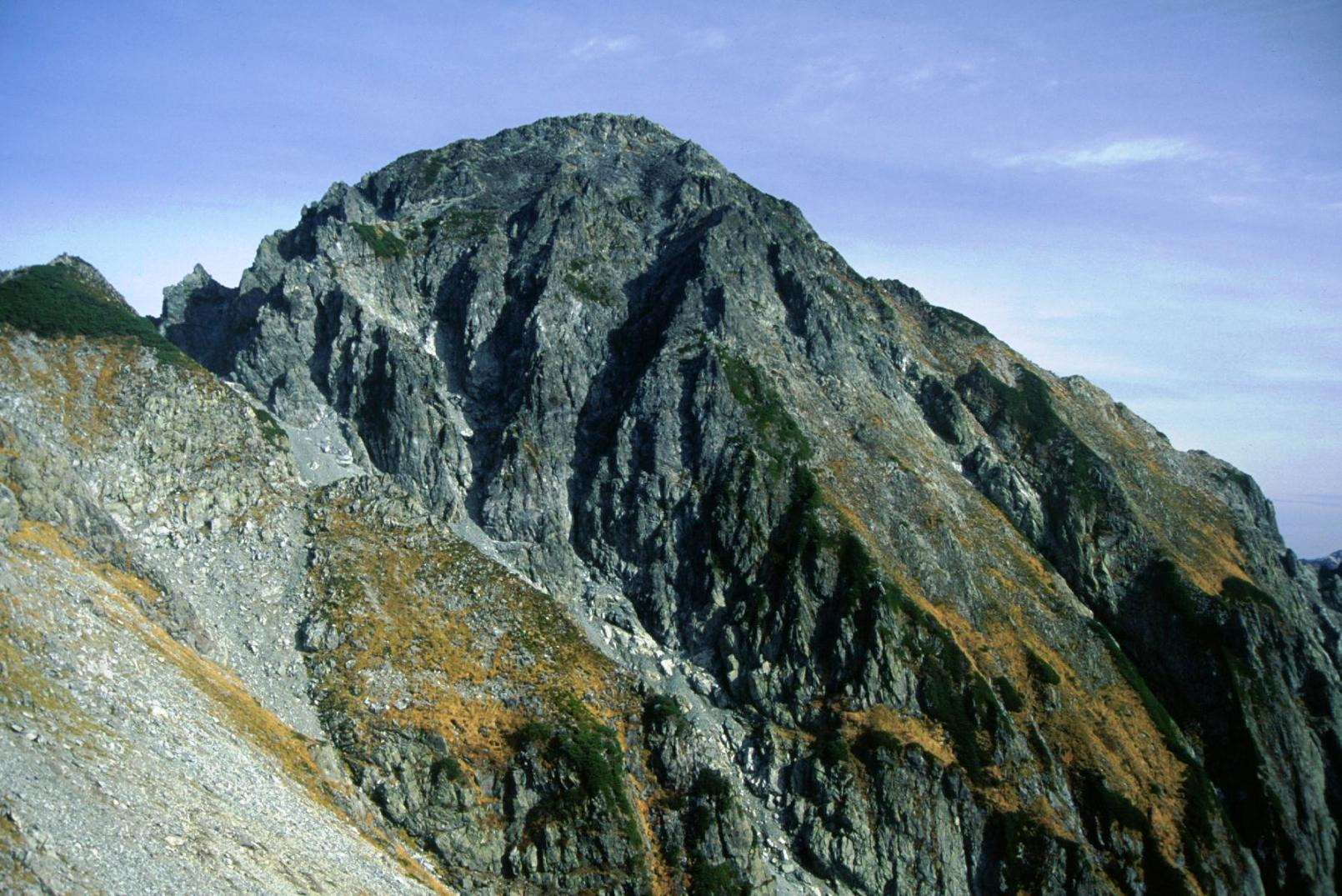
Main peak of Mount Tsurugi.

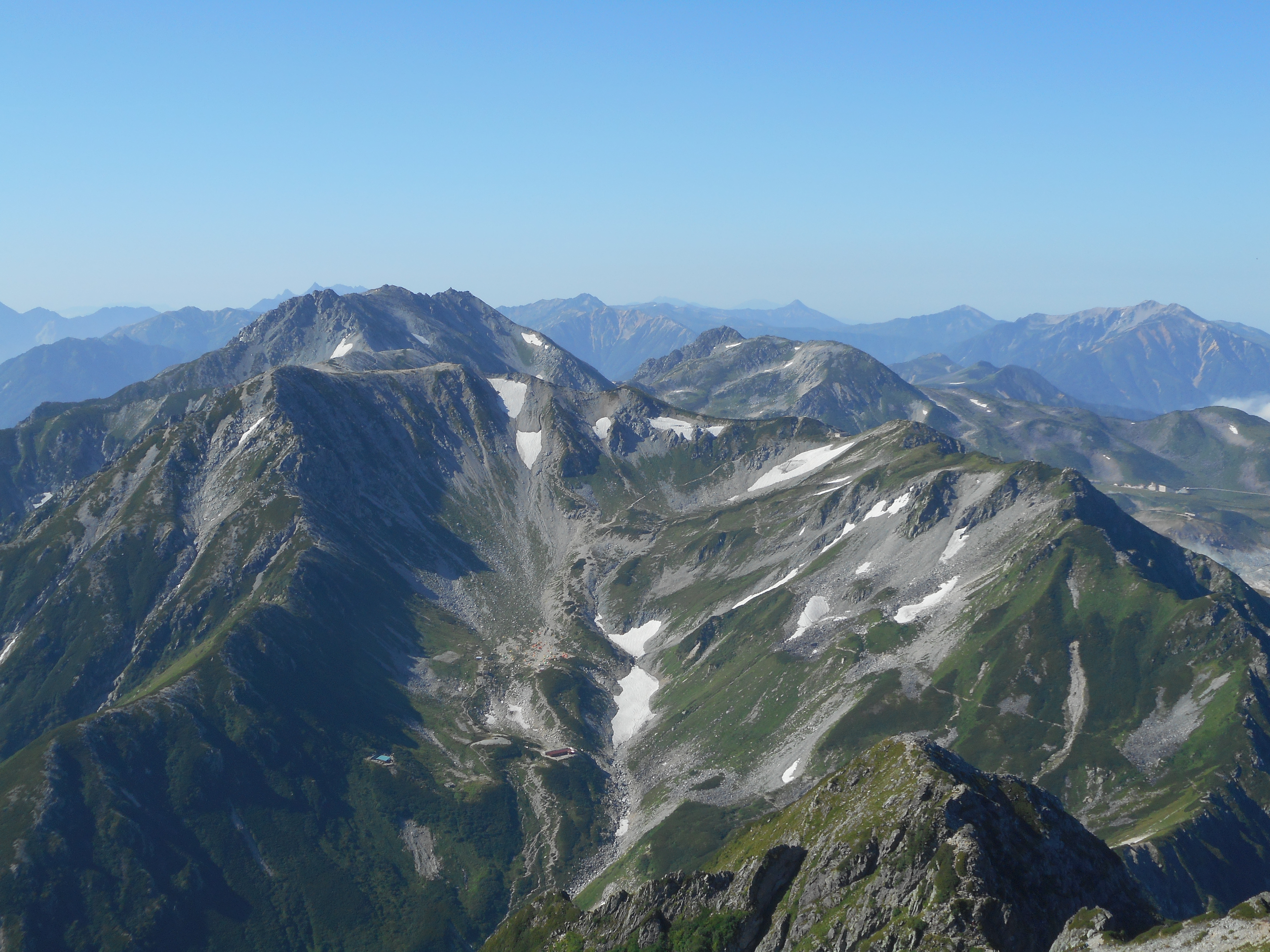
Looking south from Mount Tsurugi.

== In popular culture ==
The film Mt. Tsurugidake (劒岳 点の記, Tsurugidake Ten no Ki) was released in 2009 and won the Japan Academy Film Prize for Director of the Year.

== See also ==
- List of mountains in Japan
- 100 Famous Japanese Mountains
- Hida Mountains
- Chūbu-Sangaku National Park
