= Mount Kashimayari =

Mountain in Japan

- 鹿島槍ヶ岳
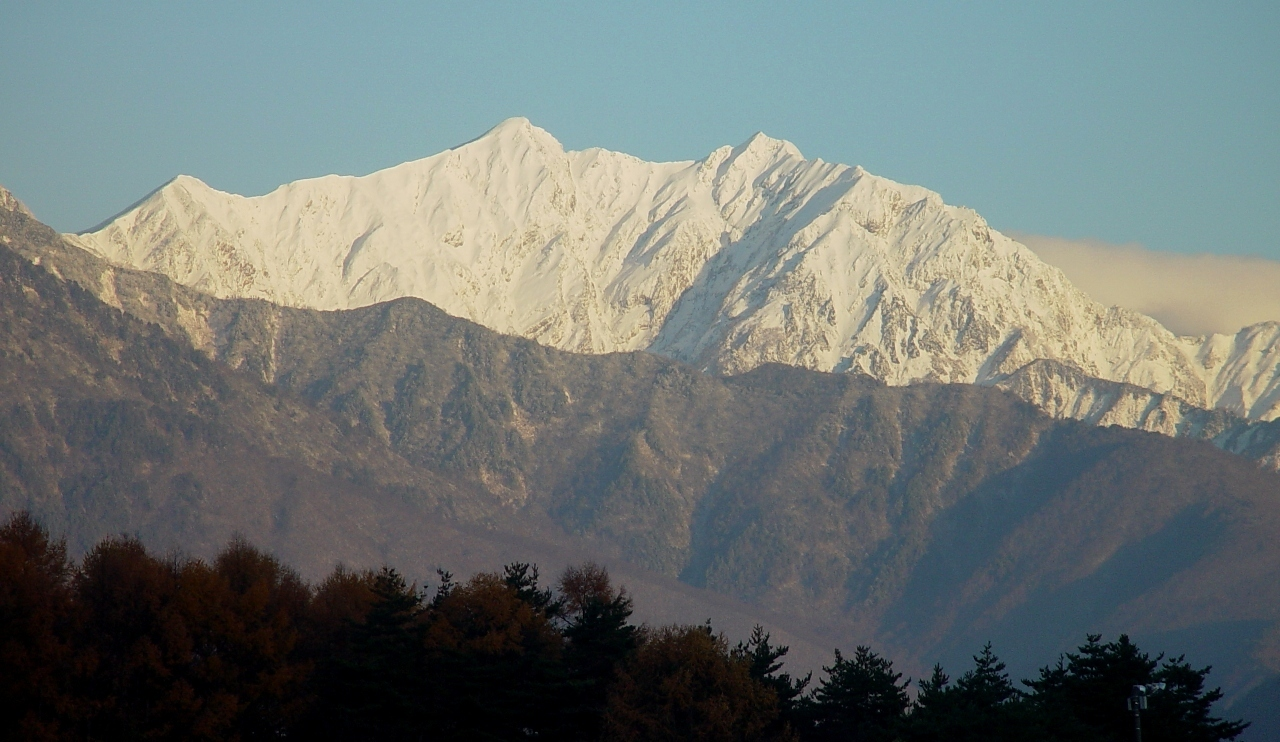
- Mount Kashimayari seen from Ōmachi

Highest point
- Elevation: 2,889 m (9,478 ft)
- Listing: List of mountains in Japan; 100 Famous Japanese Mountains
- Coordinates: 36°37′28″N 137°44′49″E

Naming
- Language of name: Japanese

Geography
- Location within Japan
- Location: Toyama Prefecture, Nagano Prefecture, Japan
- Parent range: Hida Mountains

Mount Kashimayari (鹿島槍ヶ岳, Kashimayari-ga-take) is a peak in the Hida Mountains range of the Japanese Alps at 2889m, located in Kurobe and Tateyama, Toyama and Ōmachi, Nagano, central Honshu, Japan. It is part of Chūbu-Sangaku National Park and is the second highest peak of the Ushirotateyama mountain range. It is one of the 100 Famous Japanese Mountains.
