= Mount Shirouma =

Mountain in the country of Japan

- 白馬岳
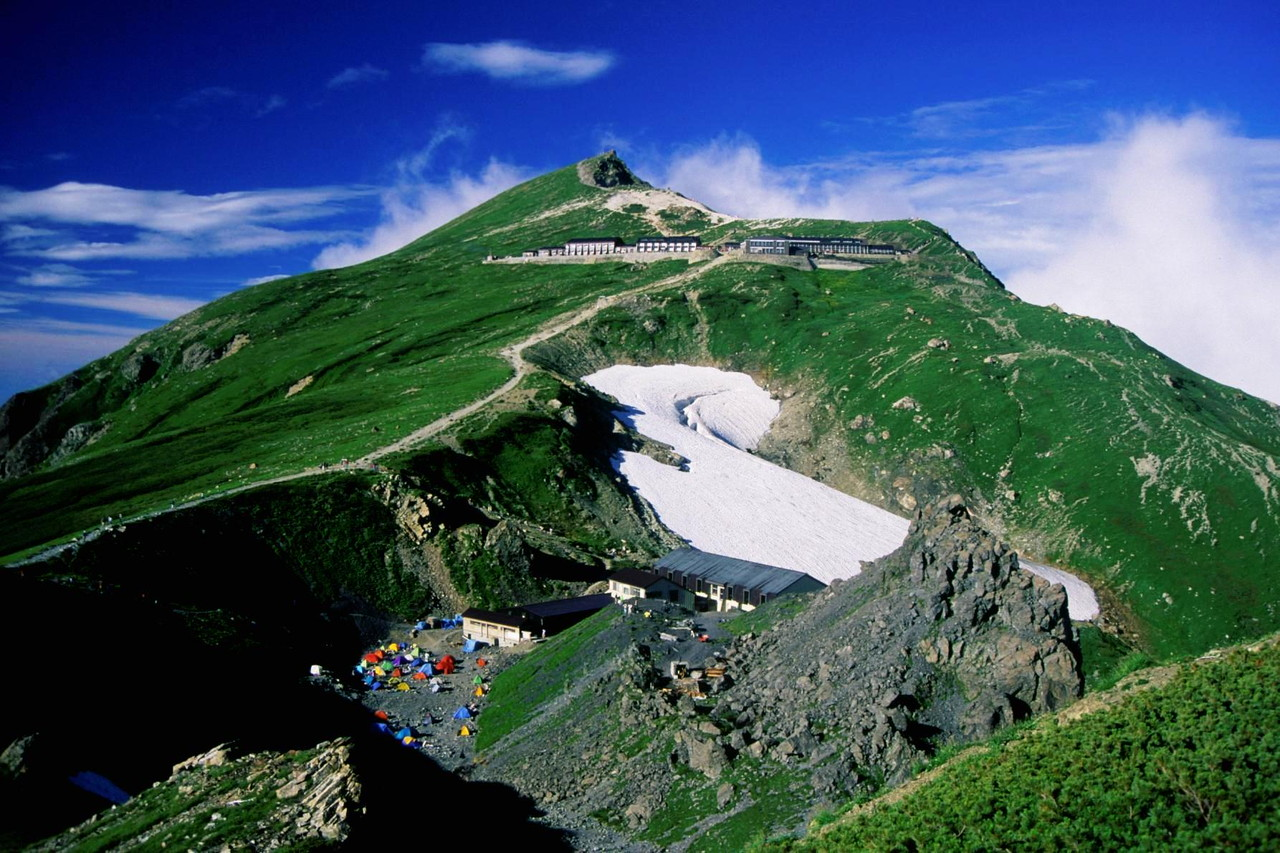
- Mount Shirouma and the Mountain hut

Highest point
- Elevation: 2,932.24 m (9,620.2 ft)
- Prominence: 752
- Listing: 100 Famous Japanese Mountains; List of mountains in Japan
- Coordinates: 36°45′31″N 137°45′31″E

Naming
- Language of name: Japanese

Geography
- Location within Japan
- Location: Hakuba, Nagano Prefecture and Kurobe, Toyama, Toyama Prefecture, Japan
- Parent range: Hida Mountains
- Topo map(s): Geospatial Information Authority 25000:1 白馬岳; 50000:1 白馬岳

Climbing
- First ascent: 1883

Mount Shirouma (白馬岳, Shirouma-dake) is a peak in the Hida Mountains range of the Japanese Alps, located in Nagano Prefecture and Toyama Prefecture, central Honshu, Japan.

== Geography ==
Mount Shirouma is the 26th-tallest mountain in Japan. At 2,932 metres (9,619 ft), it is the highest peak in the Hakuba section of the Hida Mountains, and one of the top "to climb" peaks for Japanese hikers. It is also one of the few peaks in Japan with year-round snow fields (Firn), in the Shirouma Dai Sekkei, or Shirouma deep-snow gorge (白馬大雪渓).

It is located within the Chūbu-Sangaku National Park. Mount Shirouma is one of the landmark 100 Famous Japanese Mountains.

Alpine plants are also abundant on Shirouma in the summer.

== Hiking ==
There are several popular hiking routes, including the Shirouma Dai Sekkei. This route begins at the Sarukura Lodge (猿倉荘) (1,250 m) in the village of Hakuba, and takes approximately 6 hours to reach the summit. Another popular route is via Tsugaike Panorama Way, Hakuba Ooike, and Mount Korenge (2,766 m).

There are two lodges near the summit, Hakuba Lodge (白馬山荘) (2,832 m) and Hakuba Kousha (2,730 m), and tenting is possible at the latter. There is also a lodge at Hakuba Oike.

== Gallery ==
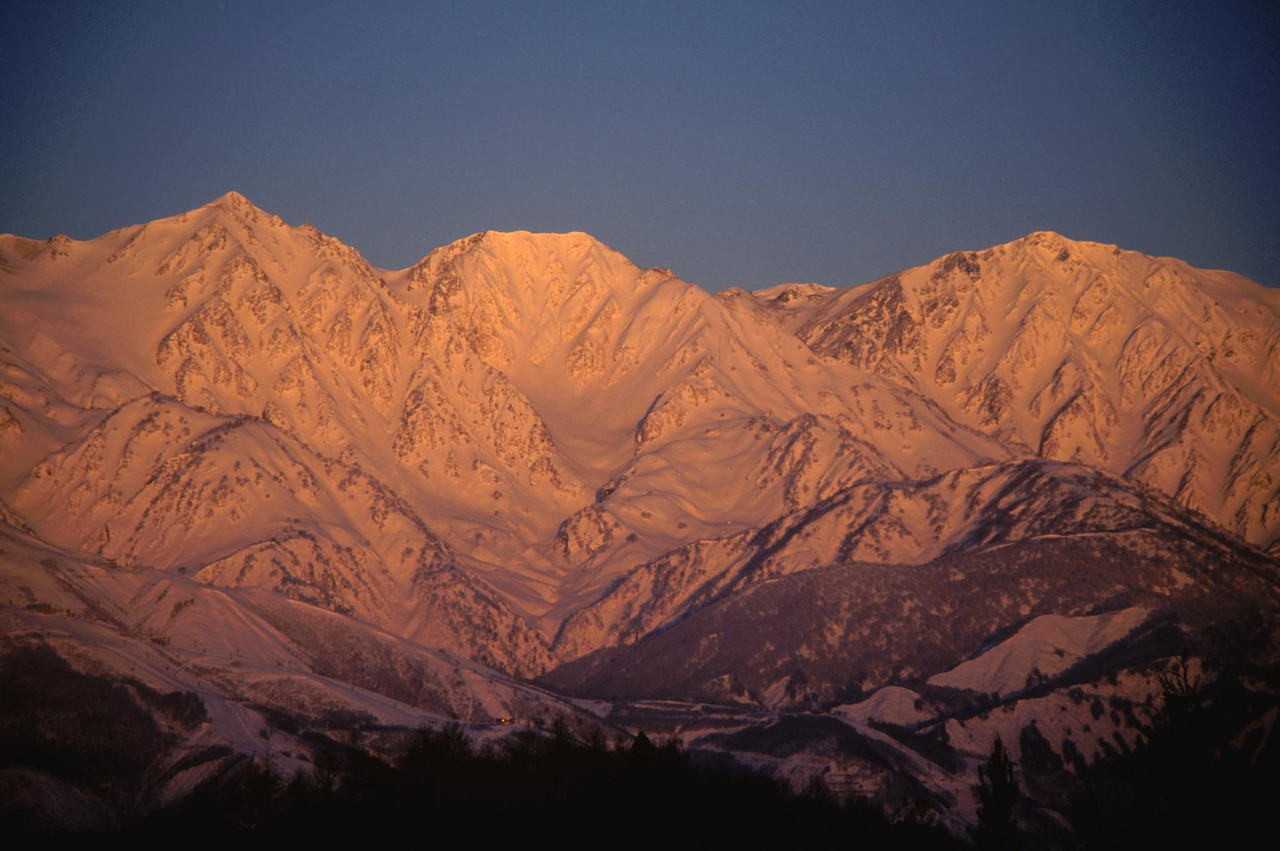
Mt. Shirouma and Mt. Korenge in winter, seen from Hakuba, Nagano

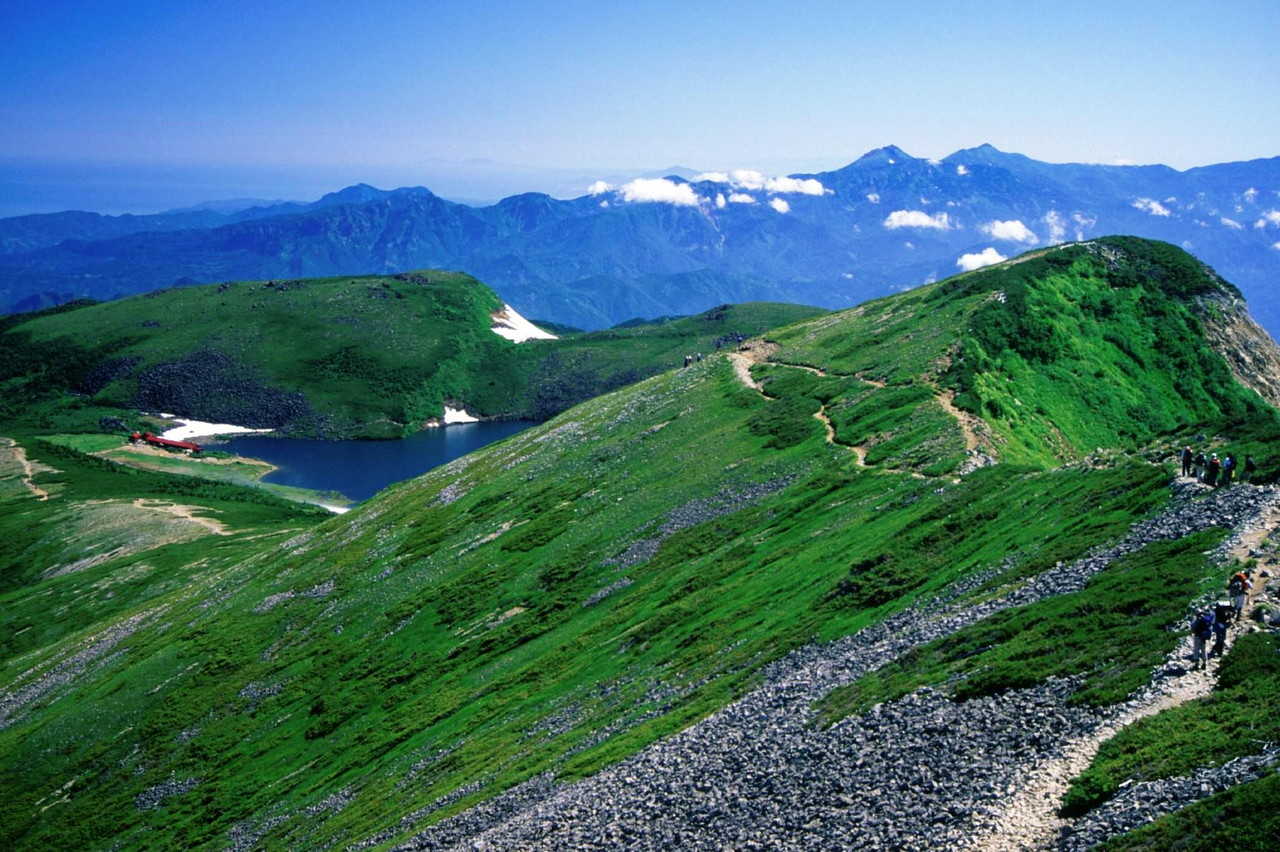
Shirouma-ōike (Shirouma Big Pond), (白馬大池) seen from Mt. Korenge

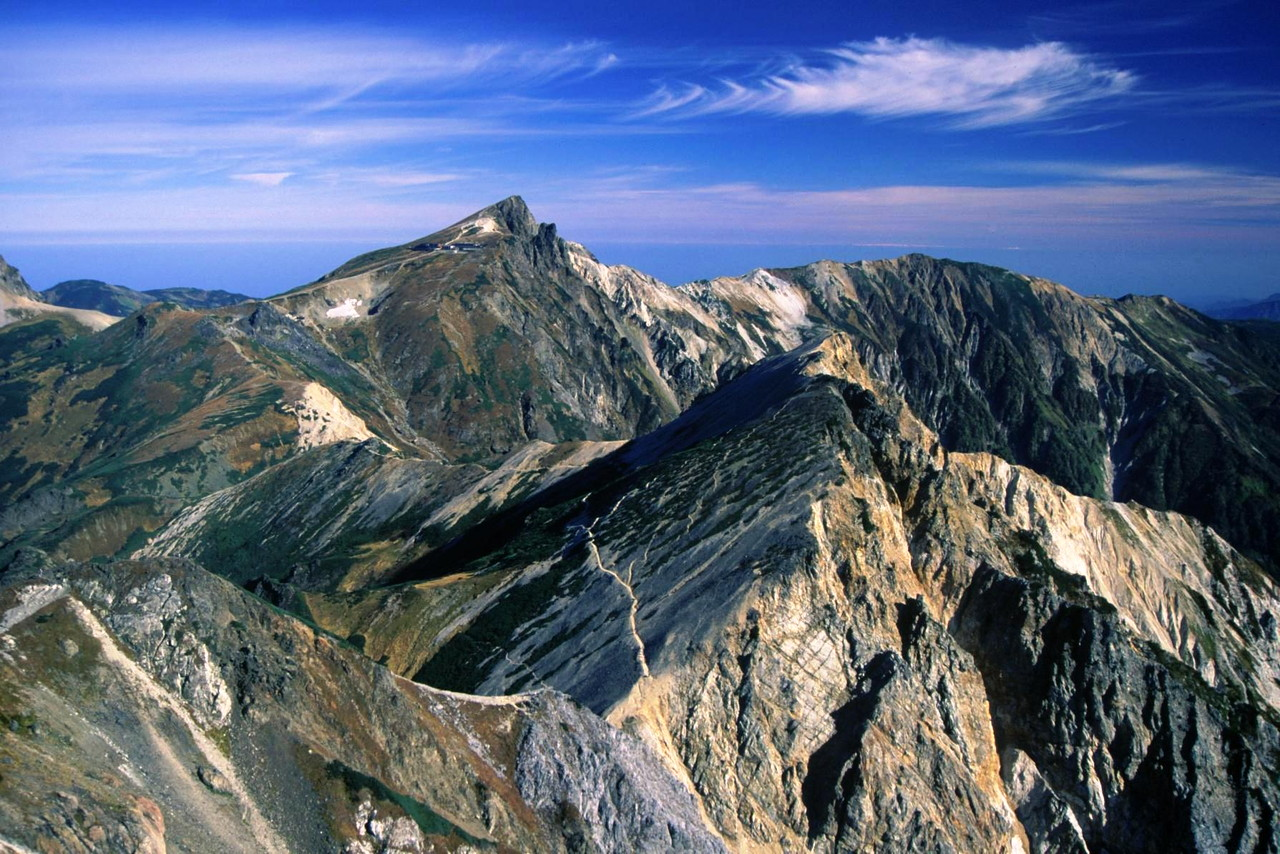
Mt. Shirouma and Mt. Korenge in autumn, seen from Mt. Shiroumayari

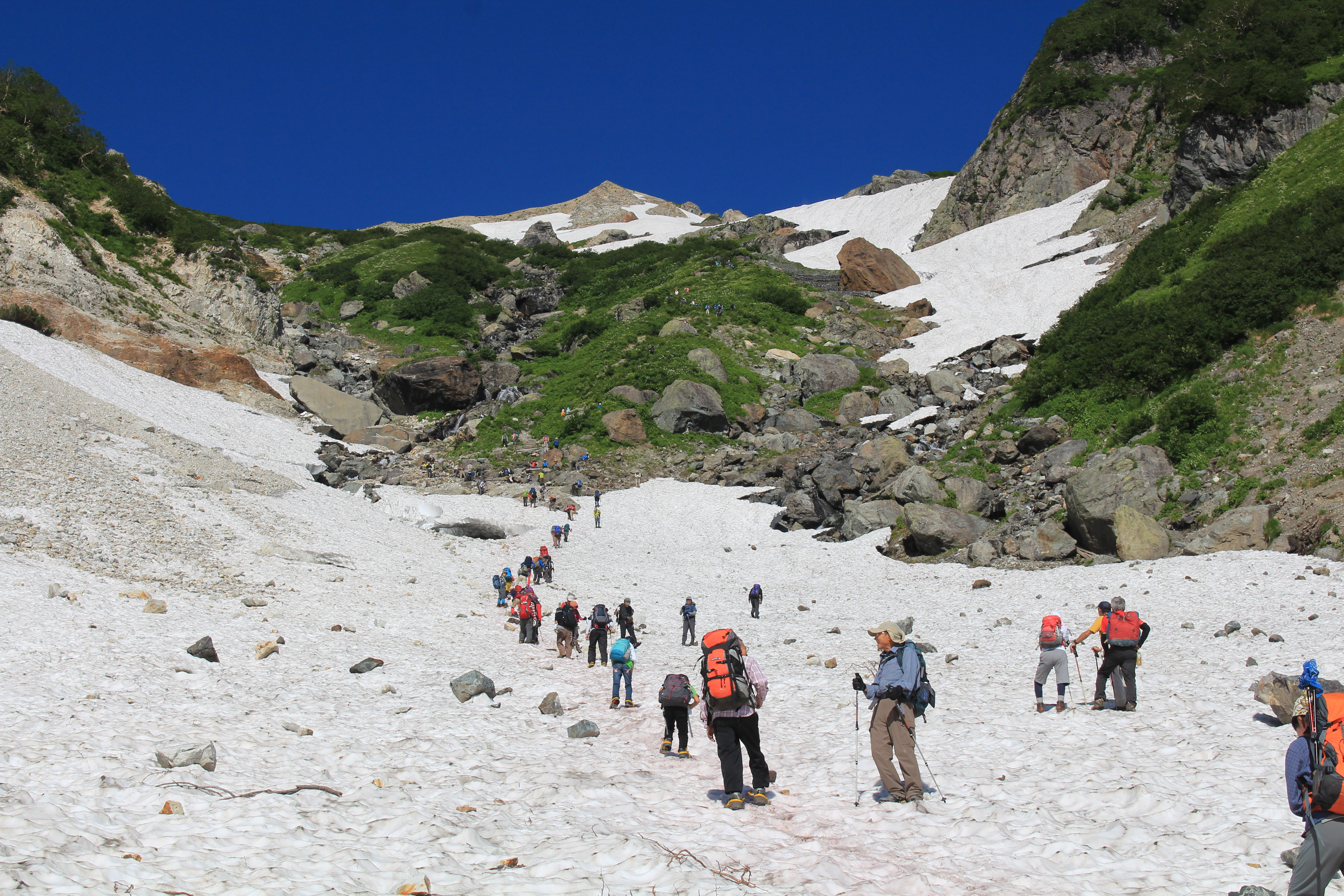
Hikers climbing the Shirouma Dai Sekkei from the Sarukura Lodge Route

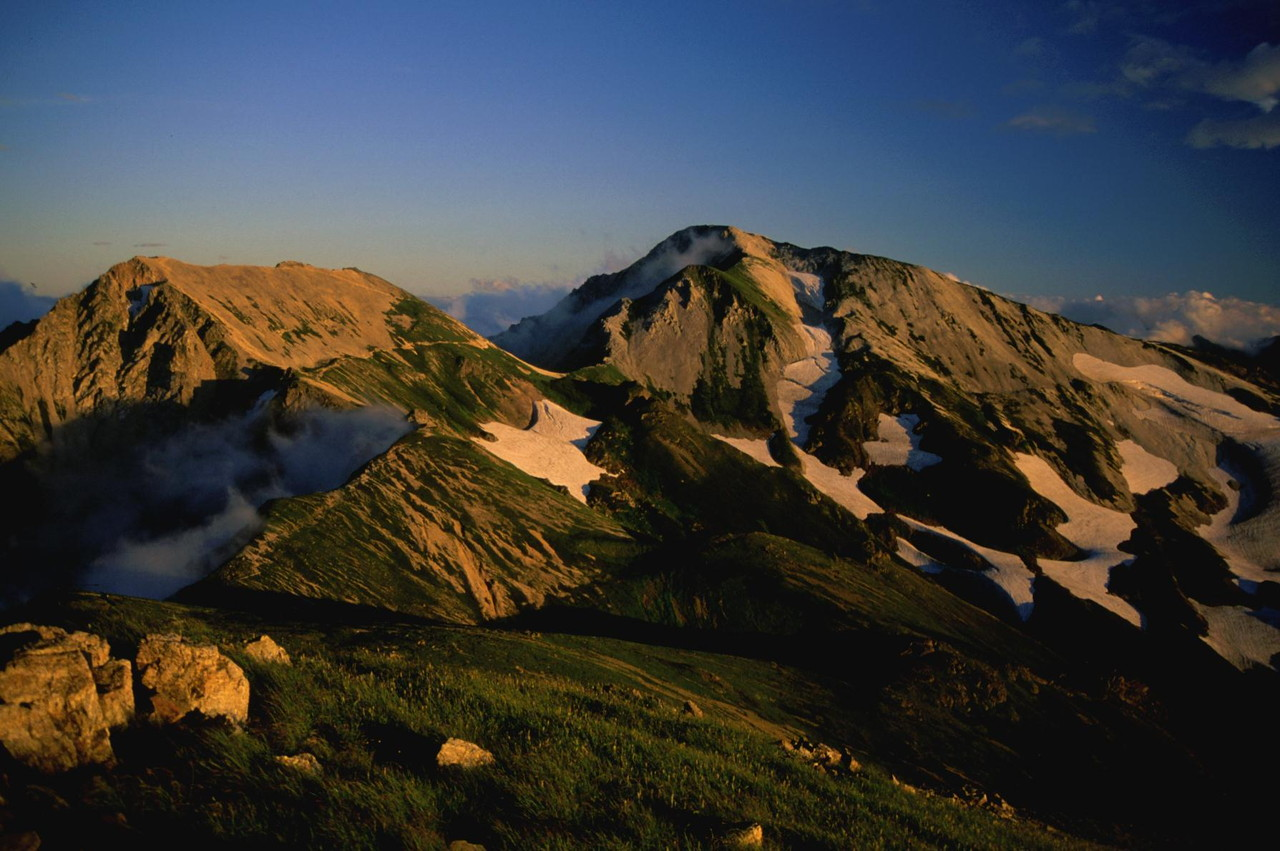
Mt. Shakushi and Mt. Shiroumayari, seen from Mt. Shirouma

== See also ==
- Chūbu-Sangaku National Park
- Hida Mountains
- List of mountains in Japan
- 100 Famous Japanese Mountains
