= List of three-thousanders in Japan =

There are 21 three-thousanders (mountains with elevations of 3,000 m (9,843 ft) or greater) in Japan. The tallest is Mount Fuji, at 3,776 metres (12,388 ft).

== Geography ==
There are three-thousanders in the following regions:

- The independent peaks of Mount Fuji and Mount Ontake.
- In the Hida Mountains ("Northern Alps") are Mount Okuhotaka, Mount Yari, Mount Karasawa, Mount Kitahotaka, Mount Ōbami, Mount Maehotaka, Mount Naka, Mount Minami, Mount Norikura and Mount Tate.
- In the Akaishi Mountains ("Southern Alps") are Mount Kita, Mount Aino, Mount Warusawa, Mount Akaishi, Mount Arakawa, Mount Nishinōtori, Mount Shiomi, Mount Senjō and Mount Hijiri.

The next tallest mountain is Mount Tsurugi, which has a height of 2,999 m (9,839 ft). In the areas exceeding 3,000 metres (9,800 ft) above sea level, there is a belt of Siberian dwarf pine; the alpine plant grows here naturally. The Siberian dwarf pine belt is a key habitat of the rock ptarmigan.

== 21 mountains ==
No.	Image	Mountain	Elevation	Prominence (m)	Prefecture	Note	Japanese
1		Mt. Fuji	3,776 m (12,388 ft)	3,776 m (12,388 ft)	Shizuoka / Yamanashi	100 Famous tallest in Japan	富士山
2		Mt. Kita	3,193 m (10,476 ft)	2,239 m (7,346 ft)	Yamanashi	100 Famous tallest in Southern Alps	北岳
3		Mt. Hotaka	3,190 m (10,466 ft)	2,307 m (7,569 ft)	Gifu / Nagano	100 Famous tallest in Northern Alps	穂高岳
3		Mt. Aino	3,190 m (10,466 ft)	300 m (984 ft)	Shizuoka / Yamanashi	100 Famous	間ノ岳
5		Mt. Yari	3,180 m (10,433 ft)	432 m (1,417 ft)	Gifu / Nagano	100 Famous	槍ヶ岳
6		Mt. Warusawa	3,141 m (10,305 ft)	741 m (2,431 ft)	Shizuoka	100 Famous	悪沢岳
7		Mt. Akaishi	3,120 m (10,236 ft)	421 m (1,381 ft)	Nagano / Shizuoka	100 Famous	赤石岳
8		Mt. Karasawa	3,110 m (10,203 ft)	127 m (417 ft)	Gifu / Nagano		涸沢岳
9		Mt. Kitahotaka	3,106 m (10,190 ft)	106 m (348 ft)	Gifu / Nagano		北穂高岳
10		Mt. Ōbami	3,101 m (10,174 ft)	81 m (266 ft)	Gifu / Nagano		大喰岳
11		Mt. Maehotaka	3,090 m (10,138 ft)	150 m (492 ft)	Nagano		前穂高岳
12		Mt. Naka	3,084 m (10,118 ft)	54 m (177 ft)	Gifu / Nagano		中岳 (北アルプス)
13		Mt. Arakawa-Naka	3,083 m (10,115 ft)	153 m (502 ft)	Shizuoka		荒川中岳
14		Mt. Ontake	3,067 m (10,062 ft)	1,712 m (5,617 ft)	Gifu / Nagano	100 Famous	御嶽山 (長野県)
15		Mt. Nishinōtori	3,051 m (10,010 ft)	261 m (856 ft)	Shizuoka / Yamanashi	200 Famous	西農鳥岳
16		Mt. Shiomi	3,047 m (9,997 ft)	505 m (1,657 ft)	Nagano / Shizuoka	100 Famous	塩見岳
17		Mt. Minami	3,032.68 m (9,950 ft)	83 m (272 ft)	Gifu / Nagano		南岳
18		Mt. Senjō	3,032.56 m (9,949 ft)	733 m (2,405 ft)	Nagano / Yamanashi	100 Famous	仙丈ヶ岳
19		Mt. Norikura	3,026 m (9,928 ft)	1,236 m (4,055 ft)	Gifu / Nagano	100 Famous	乗鞍岳
20		Mt. Tate	3,015 m (9,892 ft)	865 m (2,838 ft)	Toyama	100 Famous tallest in Toyama	立山
21		Mt. Hijiri	3,013 m (9,885 ft)	463 m (1,519 ft)	Nagano / Shizuoka	100 Famous	聖岳

== See also ==
- List of mountains in Japan
- 100 Famous Japanese Mountains
- Hida Mountains, Chūbu-Sangaku National Park
- Akaishi Mountains, Minami Alps National Park
