= Mount Aino =

Mountain in Japan

- 間ノ岳
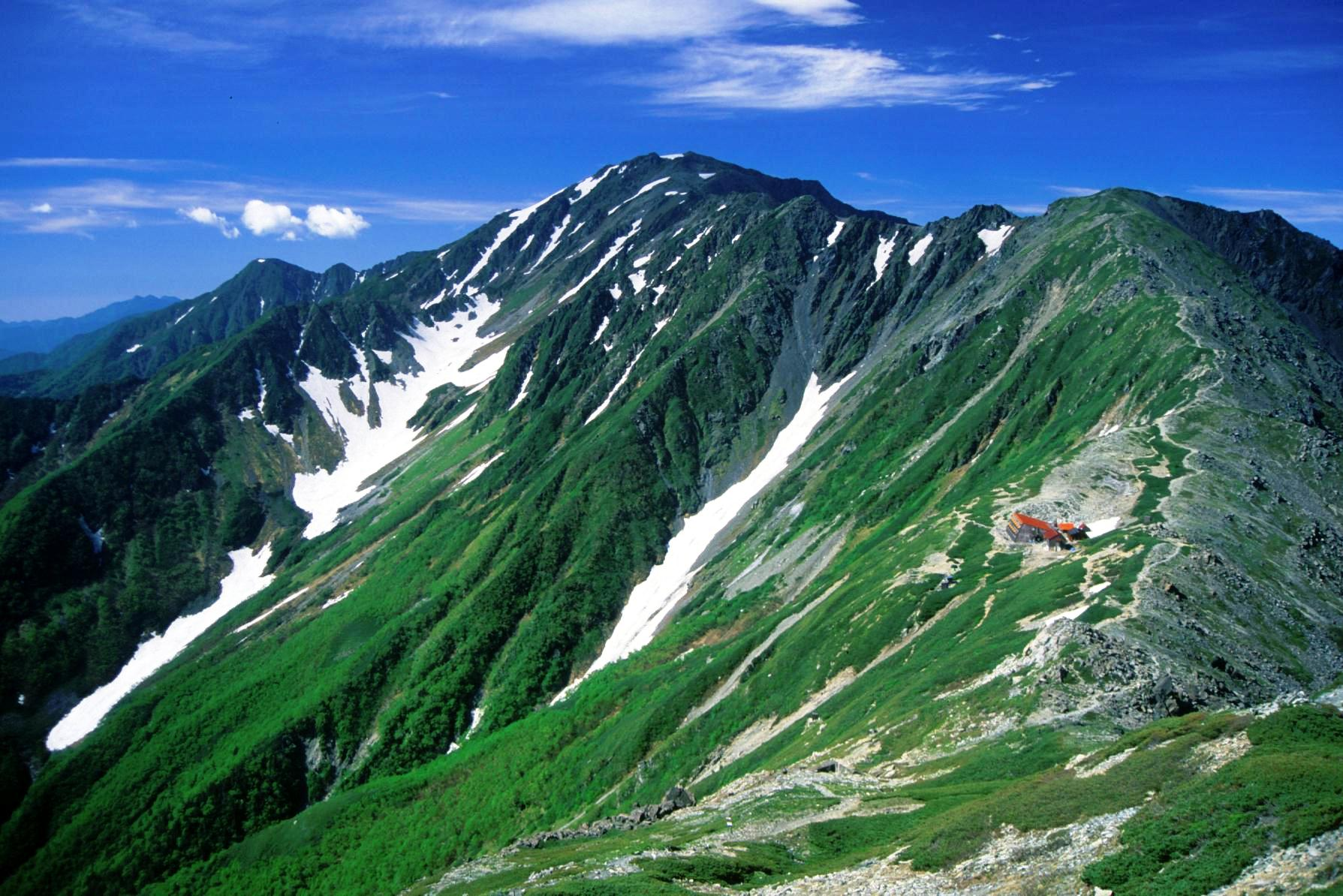
- Mount Aino and Mountain Hut Kita seen from Mount Kita in summer

Highest point
- Elevation: 3,190 m (10,470 ft)
- Listing: 100 Famous Japanese Mountains
- Coordinates: 35°38′46″N 138°13′42″E

Naming
- English translation: middle mountain
- Language of name: Japanese
- Pronunciation: Japanese: [ainodake]

Geography
- Location within Japan
- Location: Chūbu region, Honshu, Japan
- Parent range: Akaishi Mountains
- Topo map(s): Geographical Survey Institute, 25000:1 間ノ岳, 50000:1 大河原

Climbing
- Easiest route: Hike

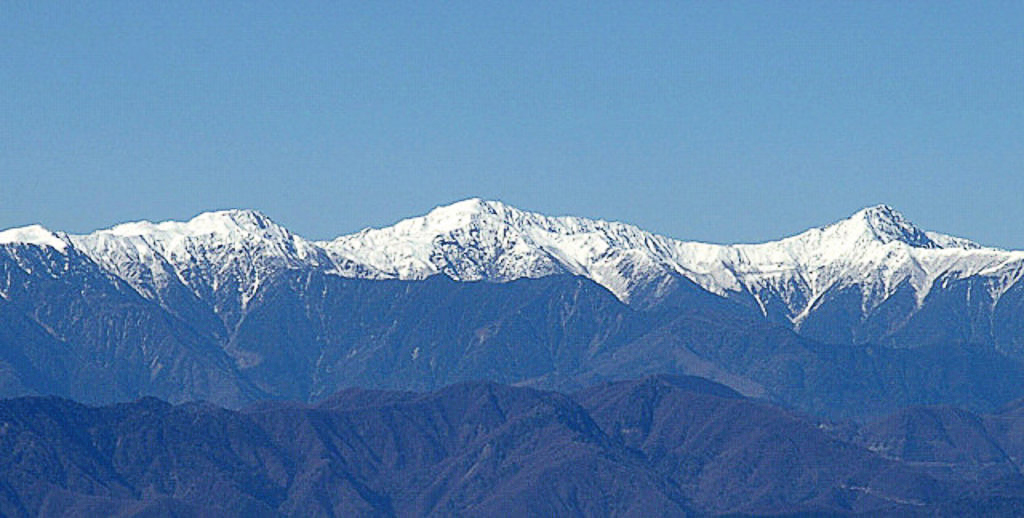
Shiranesanzan (from left to right: Mount Nōtori, Mount Aino, Mount Kita), view from Mount Kenashi in Shizuoka Prefecture (November 2006)

Mount Aino (間ノ岳, Aino-dake), or Ainodake, is a peak of the Akaishi Mountains−Southern Alps, in Minami Alps National Park, Japan. At 3,190 m (10,466 ft), it is the third tallest peak in Japan and the second highest in the Akaishi Mountains.

Its summit lies on the border of Aoi-ku and Shizuoka in Shizuoka Prefecture, and of Minami-Alps in Yamanashi Prefecture. Mount Aino is one of the landmark 100 Famous Japanese Mountains.

== Location ==
Within the Akaishi Mountains, Mount Aino is situated roughly 3 km (2 mi) south of Mount Kita, the ranges' tallest peak. Together with Mount Nōtori (農鳥岳, Nōtori-dake) to the south, the three mountains may be referred to as Shiranesanzan (白峰三山, Shiranesanzan).

East of the summit lies the cirque Hosozawa Kar (細沢カール, hosozawa-karu).

== Geography ==
Mount Aino, like most of the Shiranesanzan, abounds with alpine plants. The neighborhood is dominated by rocks where few plants can survive. It has been conceived that landslides around the summit have led to the growth of linear hollows. Taking into account such landslides, Mount Aino might have been dozens of metres higher in the past compared to its present altitude. It may have been Japan's tallest mountain during the Last Glacial Maximum. At that time, Mount Fuji had not reached its present height, and the second and third mountains (Mount Kita and Mount Hotaka) are presently only 4 and 1 metre taller, respectively.

Even though Mount Aino does not reach the height of Mount Kita, in its shape and dimension, it bears an equally great mass.

== Mountain trails ==
Mount Aino lies on the traversal route between Mount Kita and Mount Nōtori. On the summit a trail forks towards Mount Mibu (三峰岳, Mibu-dake) in the west, where it connects to the Senshio Ridge (仙塩尾根, senshio-one) traversal route.

The nearest alpine hut is Nōtori hut (農鳥小屋, nōtori-koya), which lies on a saddle to the south below Mount Nishinōtori (西農鳥岳, Nishinōtori-dake). Another Kitadake mountain cottage (北岳山荘, kitadakesansou) is situated to the north on a saddle between Mount Aino and Mount Kita.

== See also ==
- Minami Alps National Park
- Three-thousanders (in Japan)
- List of mountains and hills of Japan by height

== Gallery ==
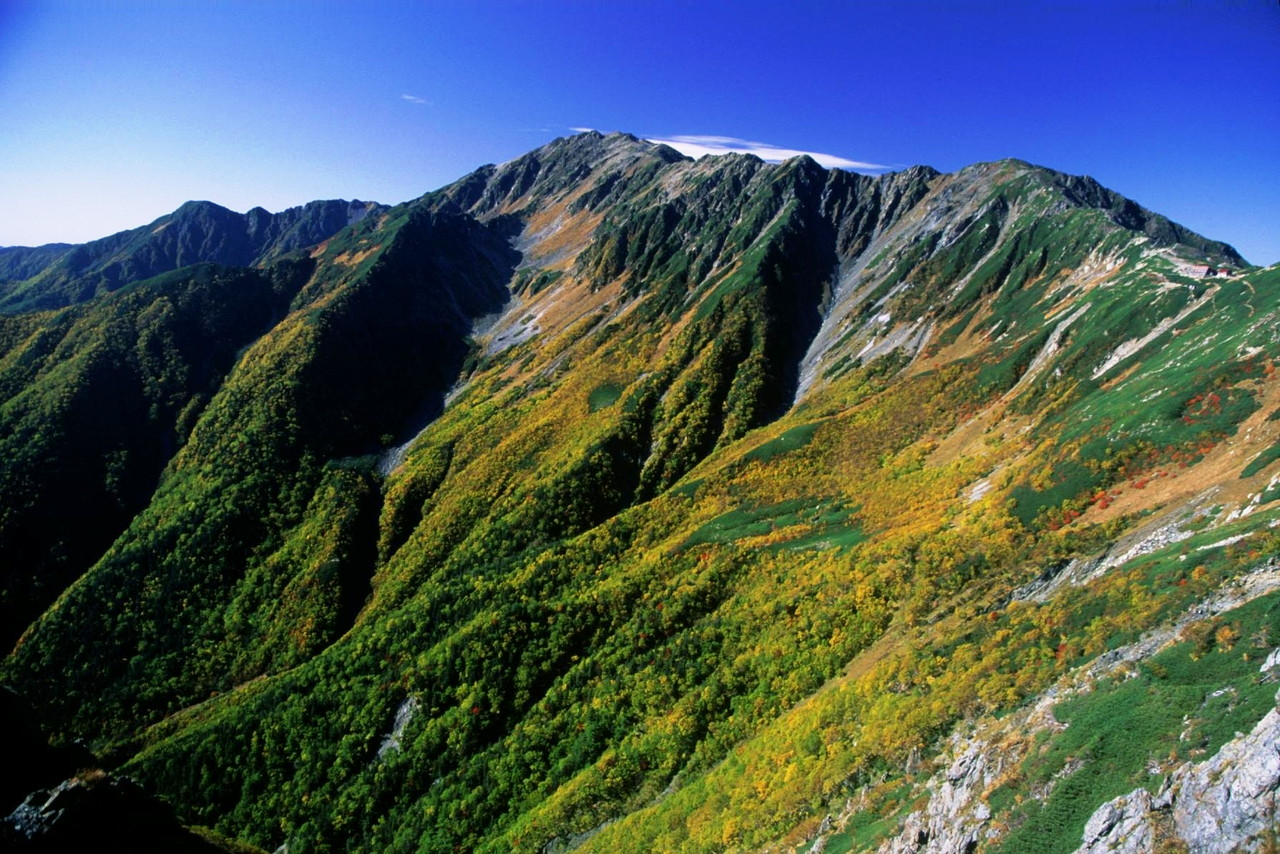
Mount Aino in autumn
from Mount Kita

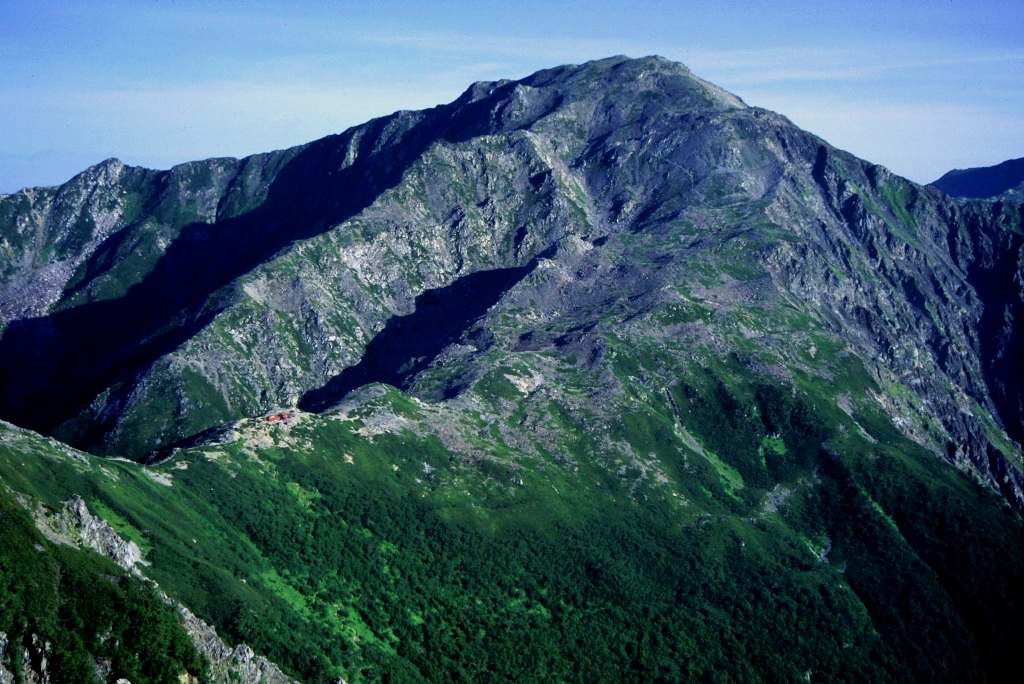
Mount Aino
from Mount NishiNōtori

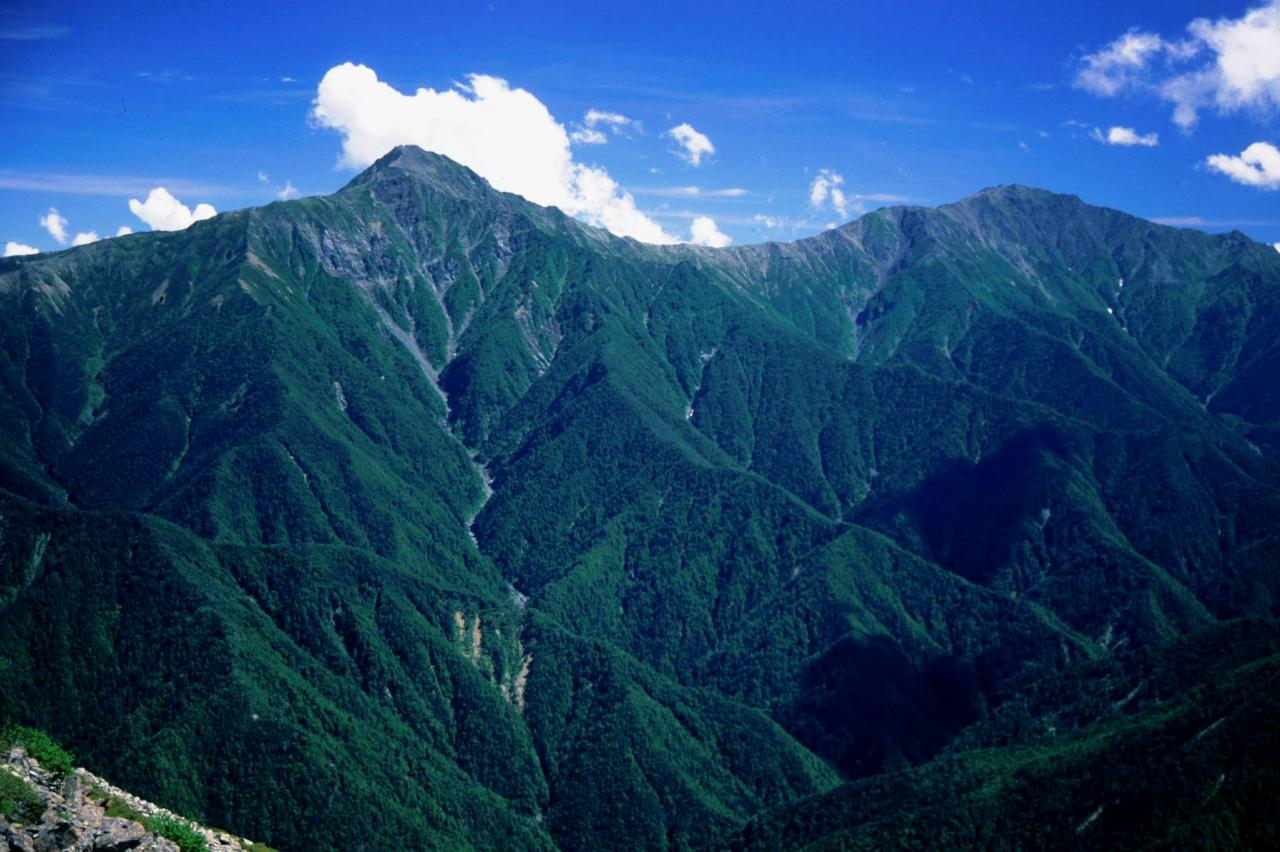
Mount Kita and Mount Aino
from Mount Senjō

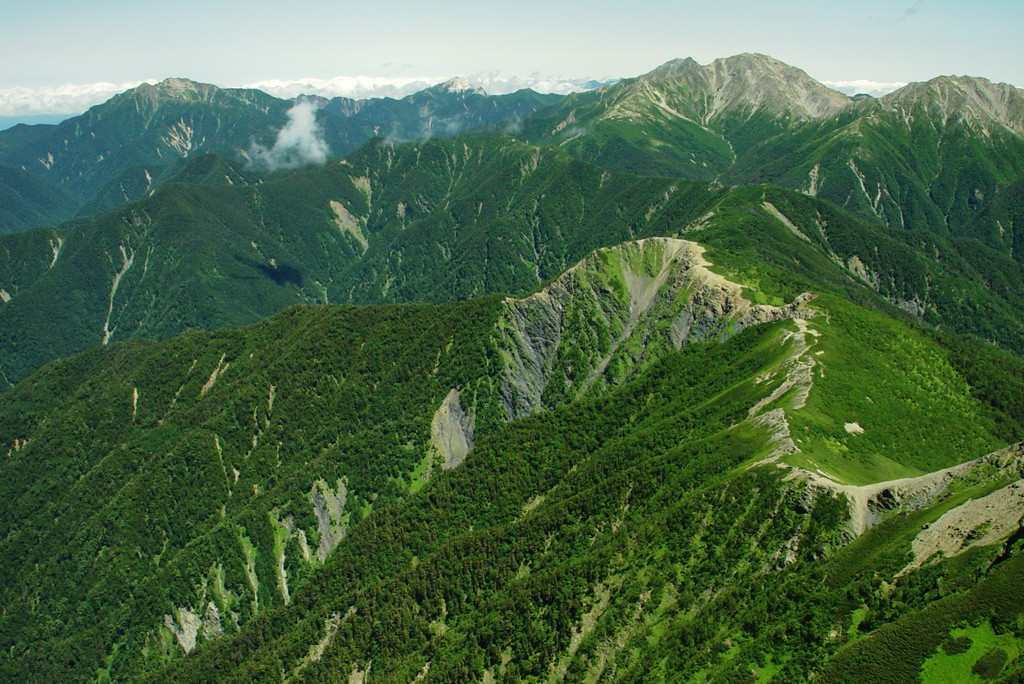
Akaishi Mountains
from Mount Shiomi

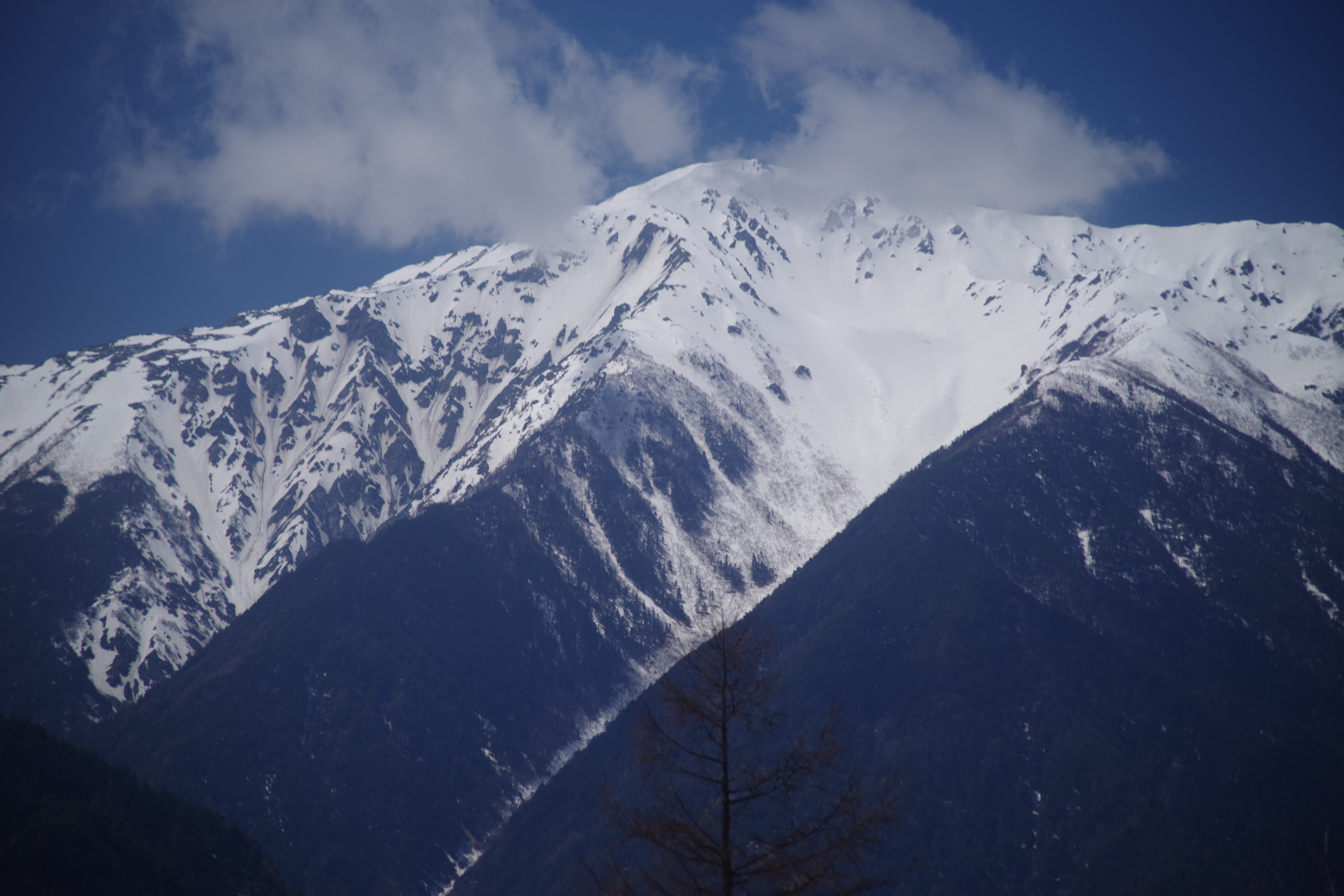
Mout Aino shot
from Yashajin Pass, Yamanashi Prefecture
