= Mount Hijiri =

Mountain in Japan

- 聖岳
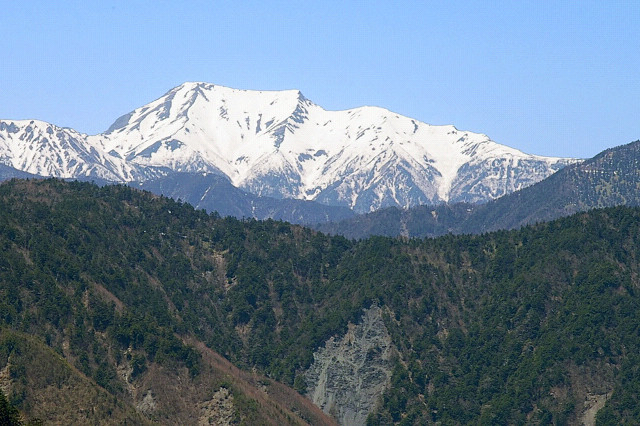
- Mount Hijiri from Mount Yanbushi

Highest point
- Elevation: 3,013 m (9,885 ft)
- Listing: 100 Famous Japanese Mountains
- Coordinates: 35°25′22″N 138°08′23″E

Geography
- Location within Japan
- Location: Aoi-ku, Shizuoka, Shizuoka Prefecture; Iida, Nagano Prefecture, Japan
- Parent range: Akaishi Mountains

Mount Hijiri (聖岳, Hijiri-dake) is a mountain located in the Akaishi Mountains in Aoi-ku, Shizuoka, (Shizuoka Prefecture) and Iida, (Nagano Prefecture) in the Chūbu region of Japan. It is 3,013 m (9,885 ft) high. It is the southernmost mountain in Minami Alps National Park and is included on the list of "100 Famous Japanese Mountains". There are several mountain climbing trails and mountain huts around the mountain including the Hijiri-Daira hut in the mountain pass in the south.

== Animals and Alpine plants ==
A lot of alpine plants and rock ptarmigans are seen in the upper alpine region. Sika deer are seen on the hillside.

== See also ==
- List of mountains in Japan
- Three-thousanders (in Japan)

== Gallery ==
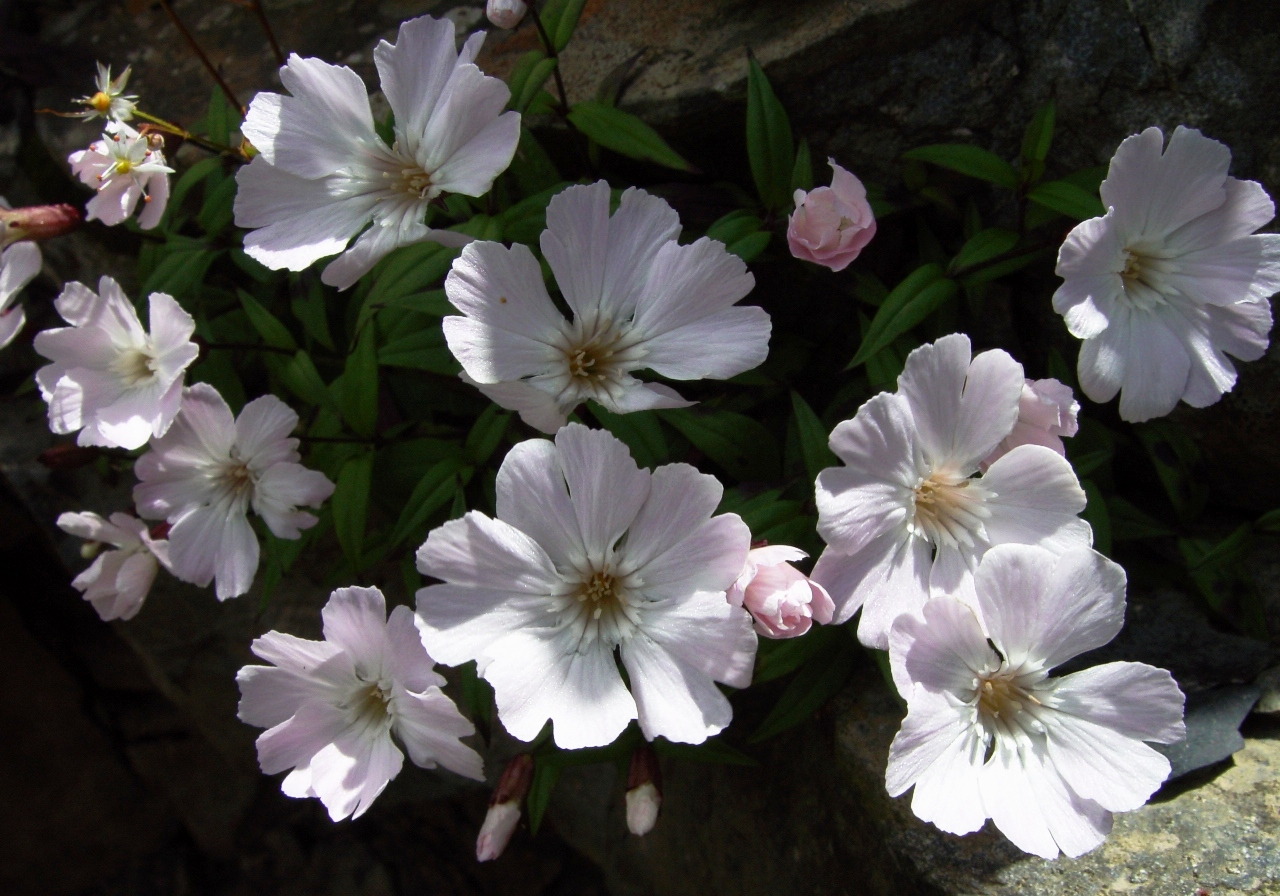
Silene seen around Mount Ko-Hijiri

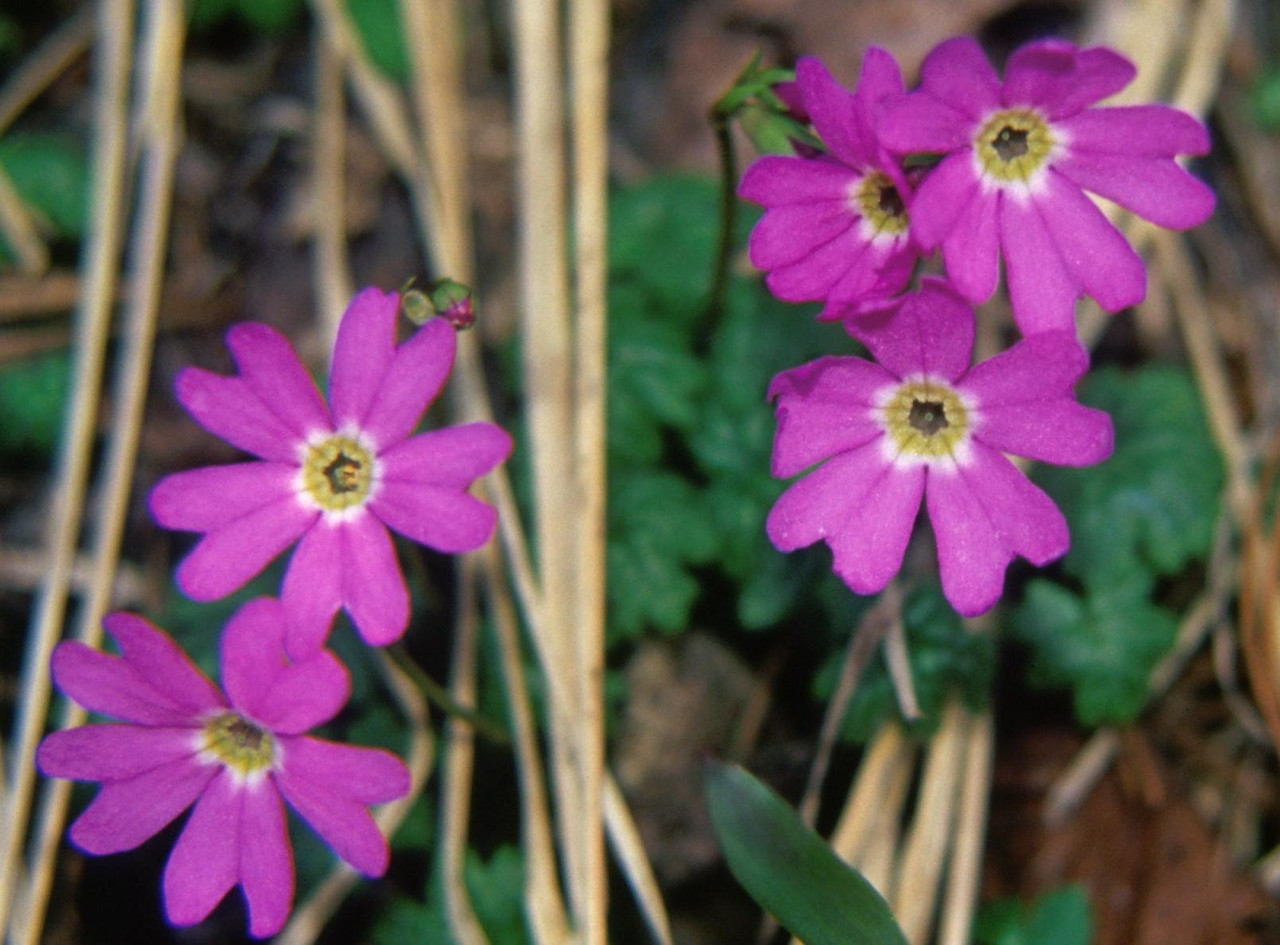
Primula seen around Mount Hijiri-Daira

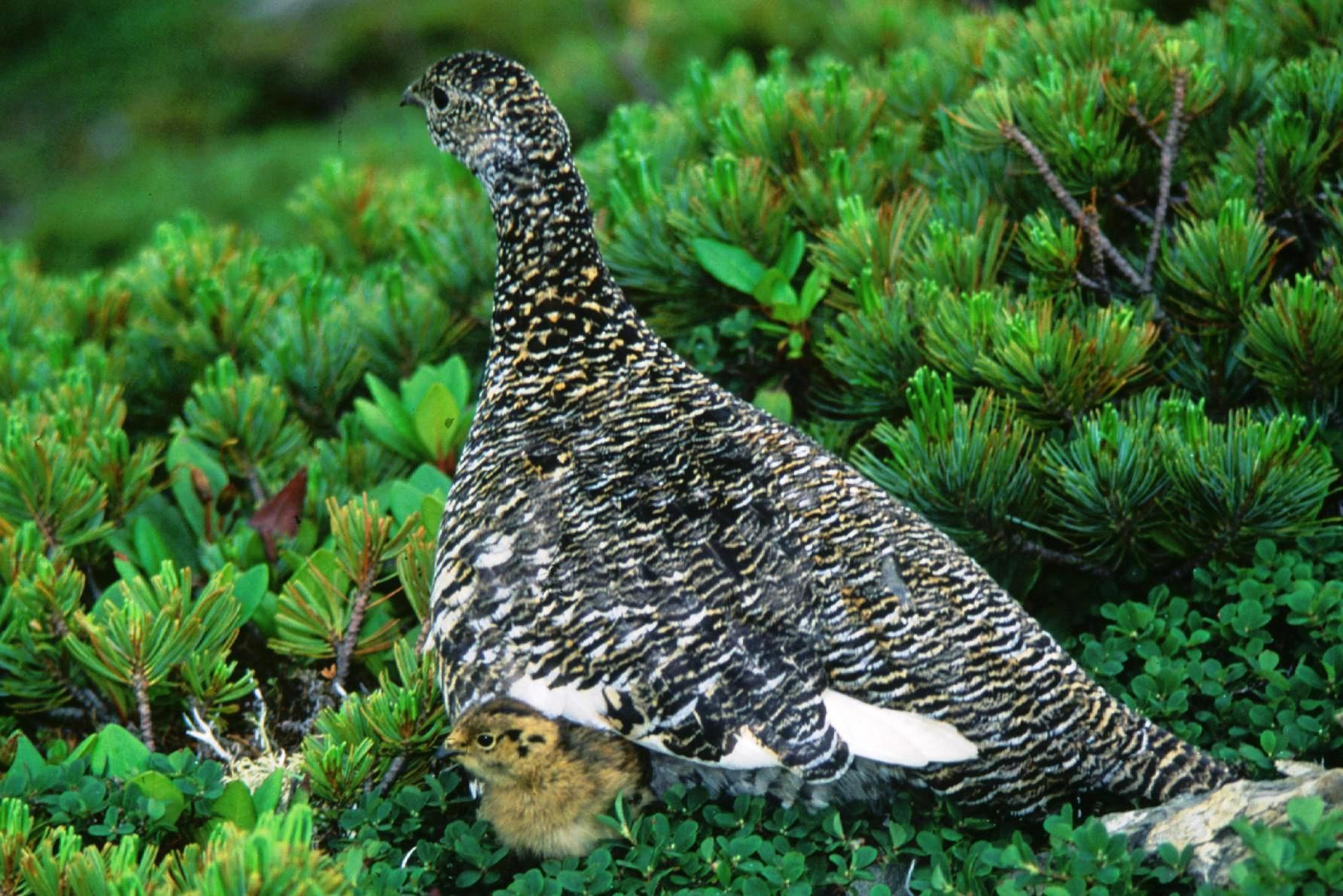
Rock ptarmigan and Siberian dwarf pine

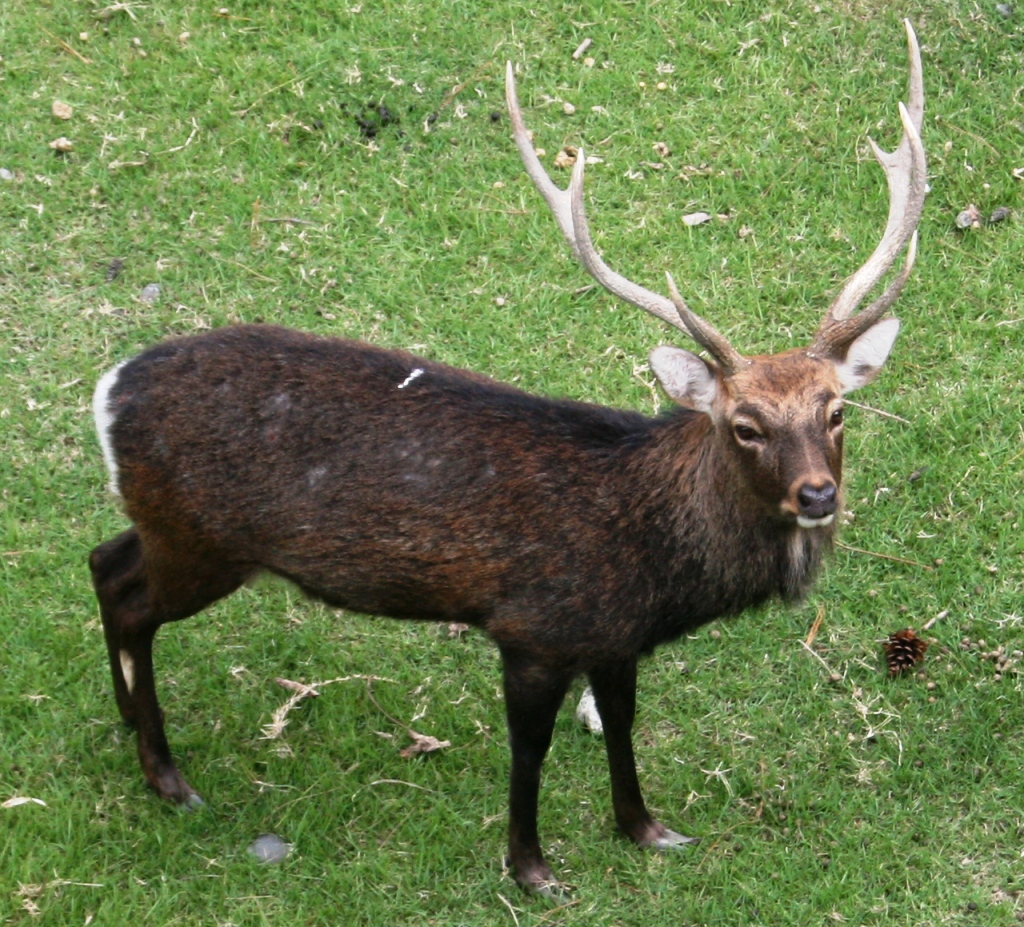
Sika deer seen around Mount Hijiri-Daira

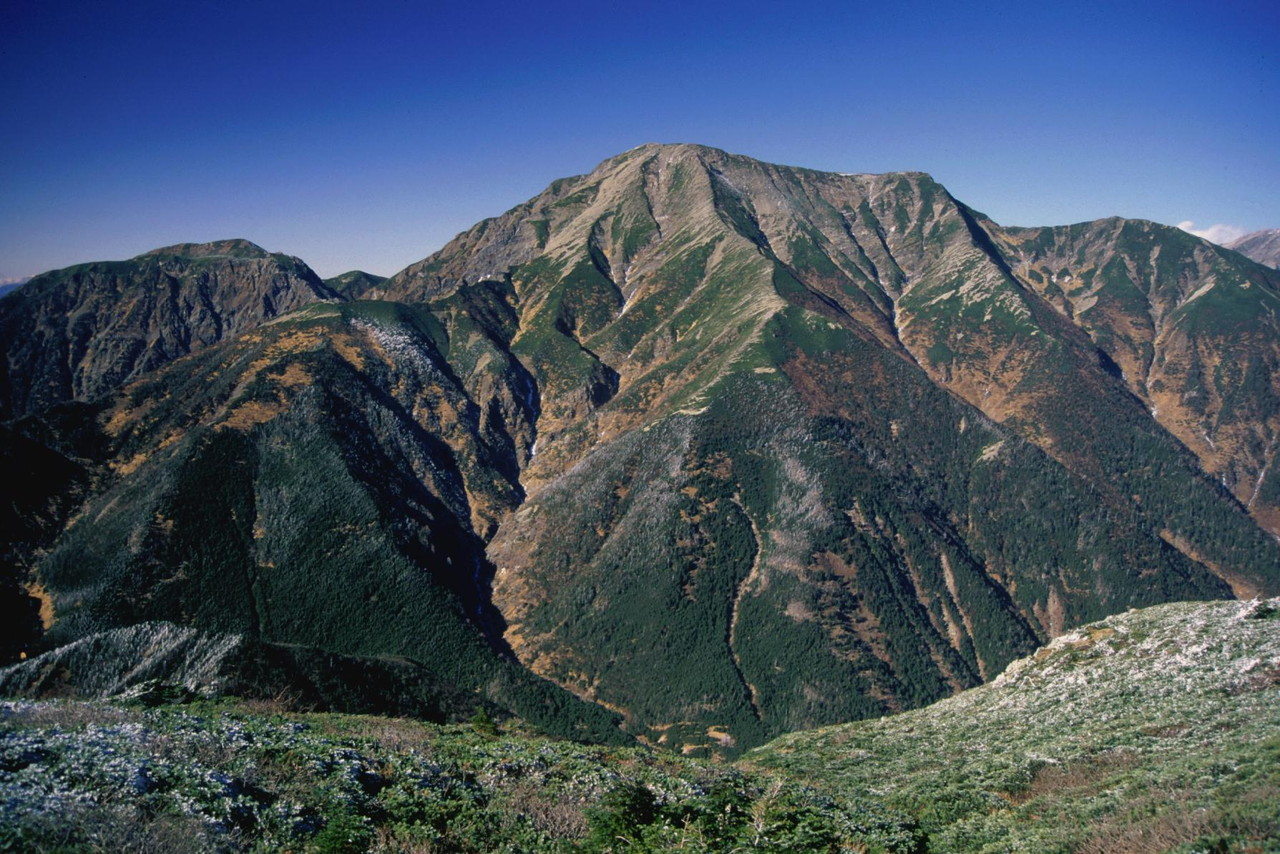
Mount Hijiri seen from Mount Minami

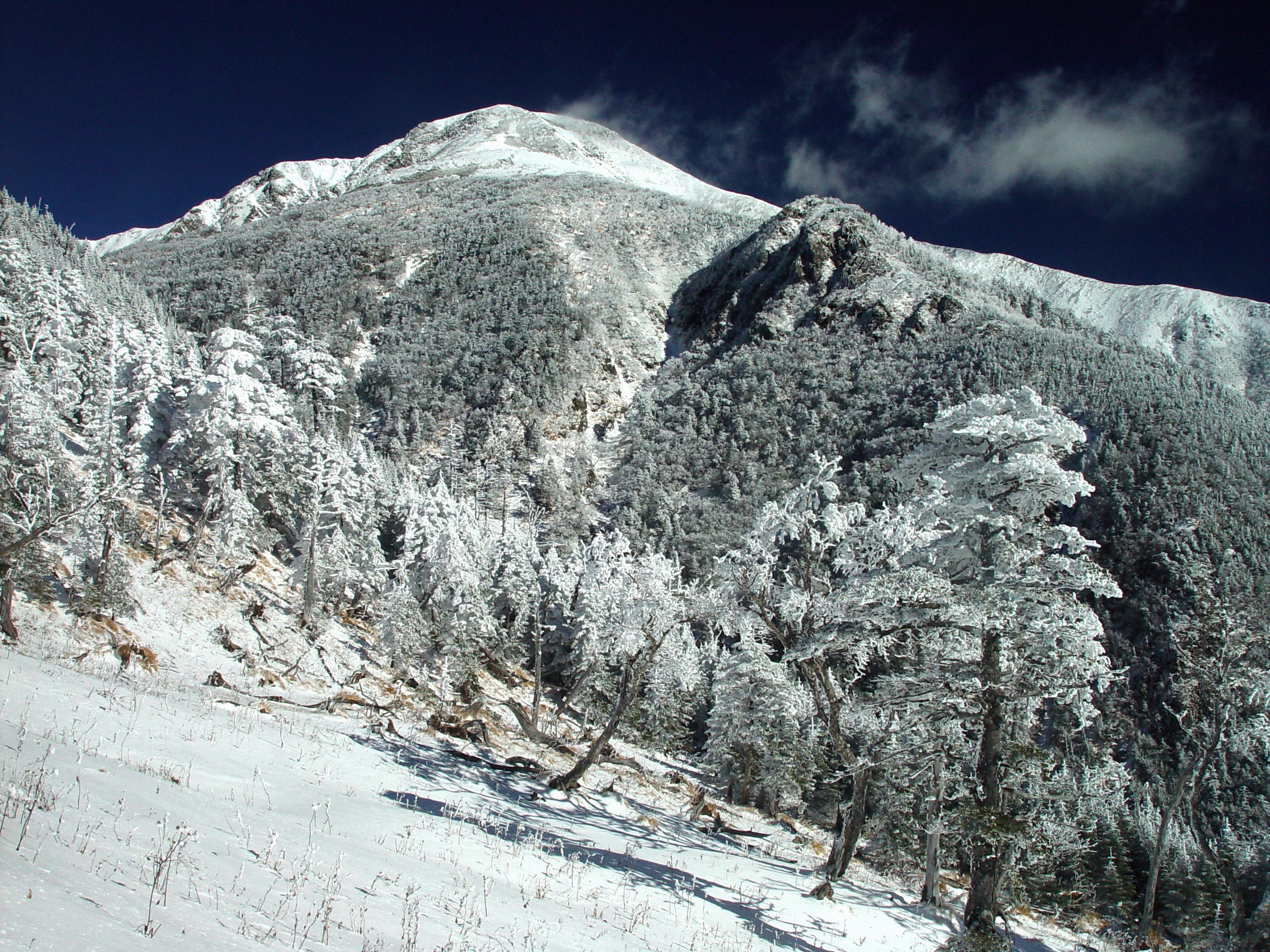
Mount Hijiri seen from Hujiri-Daira

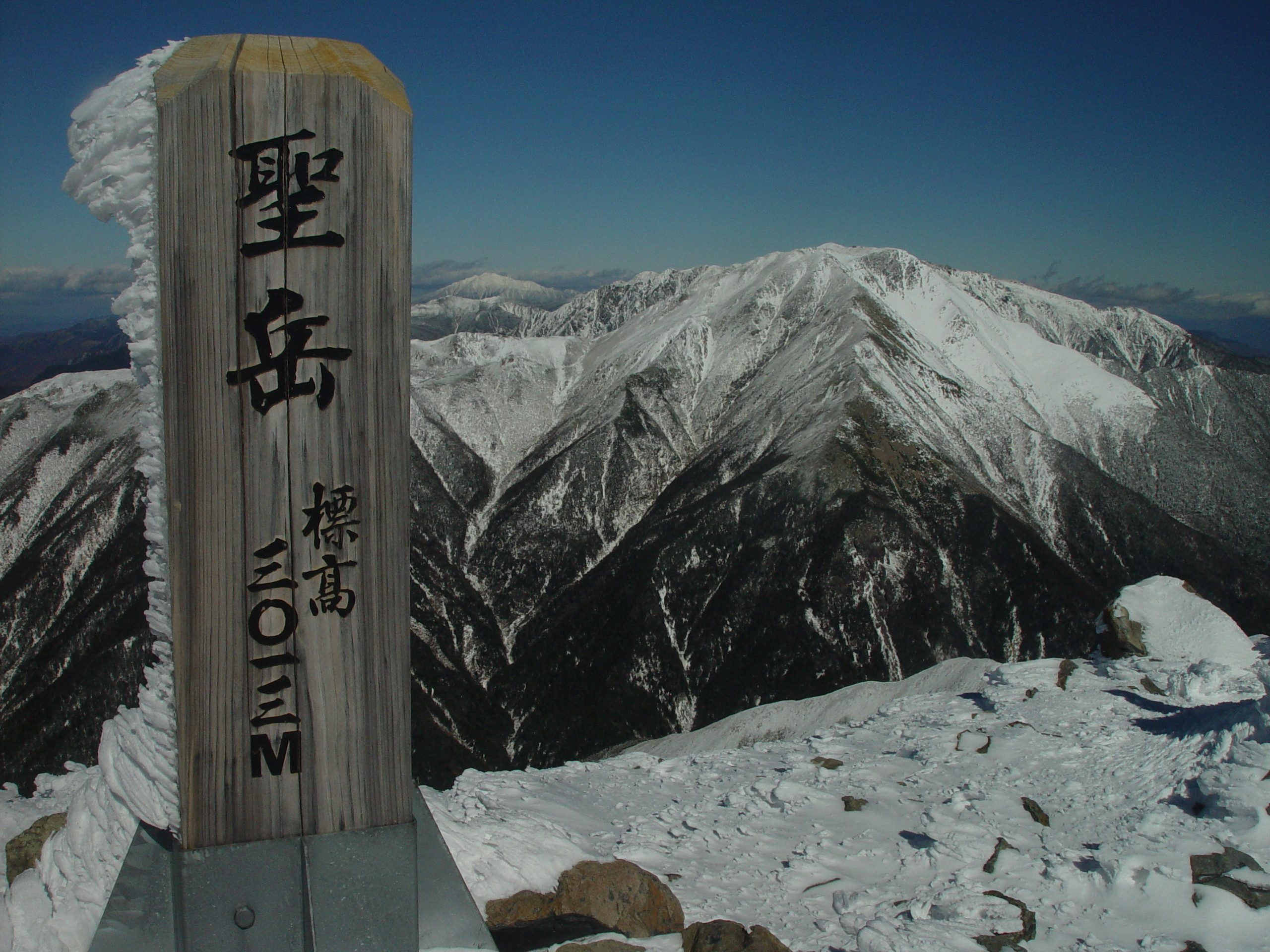
Mount Akaishi seen from Mount Hijiri

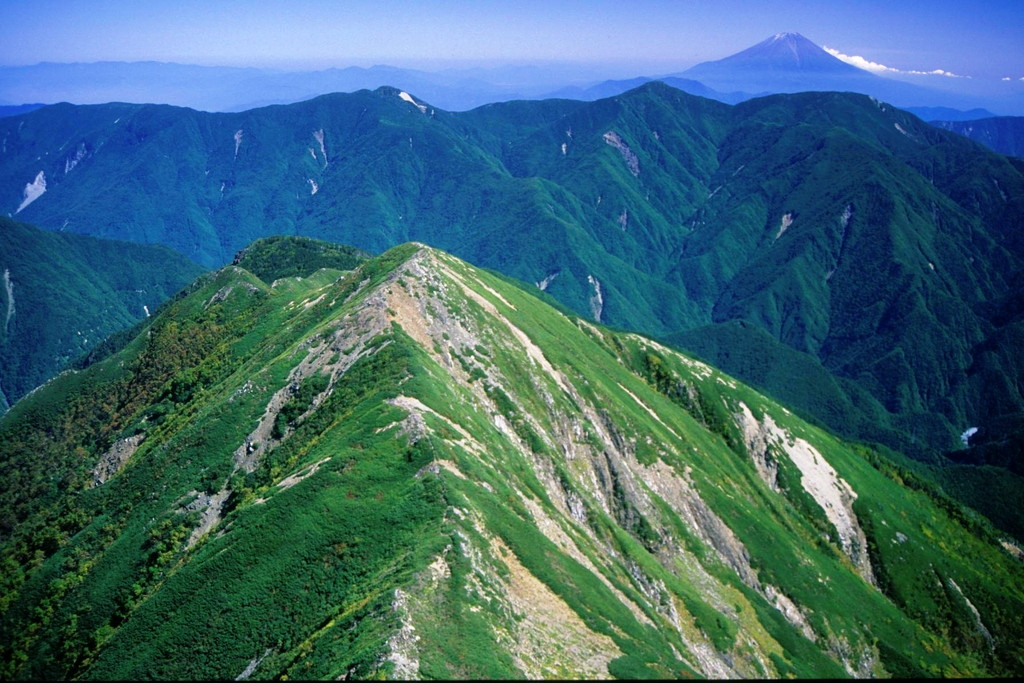
Mount Oku-Hijiri and Mount Fuji seen from Mount Hijiri
