= Mount Akaishi =

Peak in the Akaishi Mountains

- 赤石岳
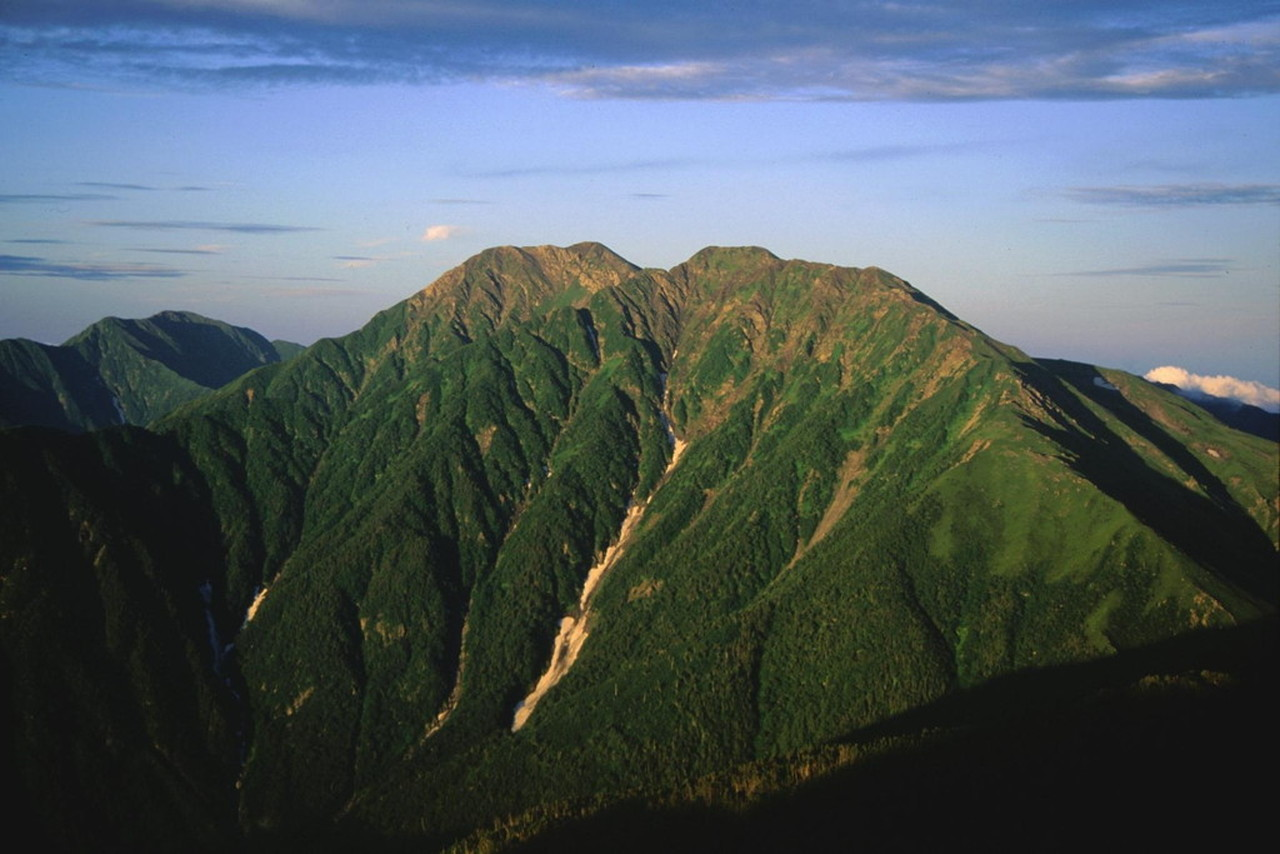

Highest point
- Elevation: 3,120 m (10,240 ft)
- Listing: 100 Famous Japanese Mountains
- Coordinates: 35°27′40″N 138°9′26″E

Geography
- Location within Japan
- Location: Japan
- Parent range: Akaishi Mountains

Geology
- Mountain type(s): Pyramidal peak, Fault block

Climbing
- First ascent: 1879
- Easiest route: Hiking

Mount Akaishi (赤石岳, Akaishi-dake), is a peak in the Akaishi Mountains, on the border of Shizuoka and Nagano Prefectures in central Honshū, Japan.

On June 1, 1964, the mountain was included within the Minami Alps National Park.

== Geography ==
At 3,120 metres (10,240 ft), Mount Akaishi is the 7th tallest peak in Japan and the 4th tallest peak in the Akaishi Mountains. The peak is located within the Minami Alps National Park.

There is a triangulation station on the summit, with a Mountain hut located below, on its southern approach. On the eastern slope is a cirque, with the trace remnants of Japan's southernmost glacier.

At the timberline are stands of Siberian dwarf pine, above which are numerous flowering alpine plants, and the habitat for the Rock Ptarmigan.

== Ascents ==
The first recorded ascent of Mount Akaishi was by Haruki Nashiba and Masaaki Terasawa of the Japanese Home Ministry in 1879. They were followed in July 1881 by a government survey team, which established the triangulation station. Ascent of the mountain became popular after a road was established to its base in 1886. The first westerner to ascend the mountain was the English missionary and mountaineer, Walter Weston on August 19, 1892.

In 1906, Usui Kojima of the Japan Alpine Club devoted the first issue of the club's magazine, Sangaku, to Mount Akashi, and Usui pioneered a new route up the mountain in 1909. In the summer of 1926, the 88-year-old founder of the Ōkura zaibatsu, Okura Kihachiro, decided that he wanted to visit the highest point of his company's holdings, and climbed Mount Akaki with the assistance of 200 porters using palanquin.

== Gallery ==
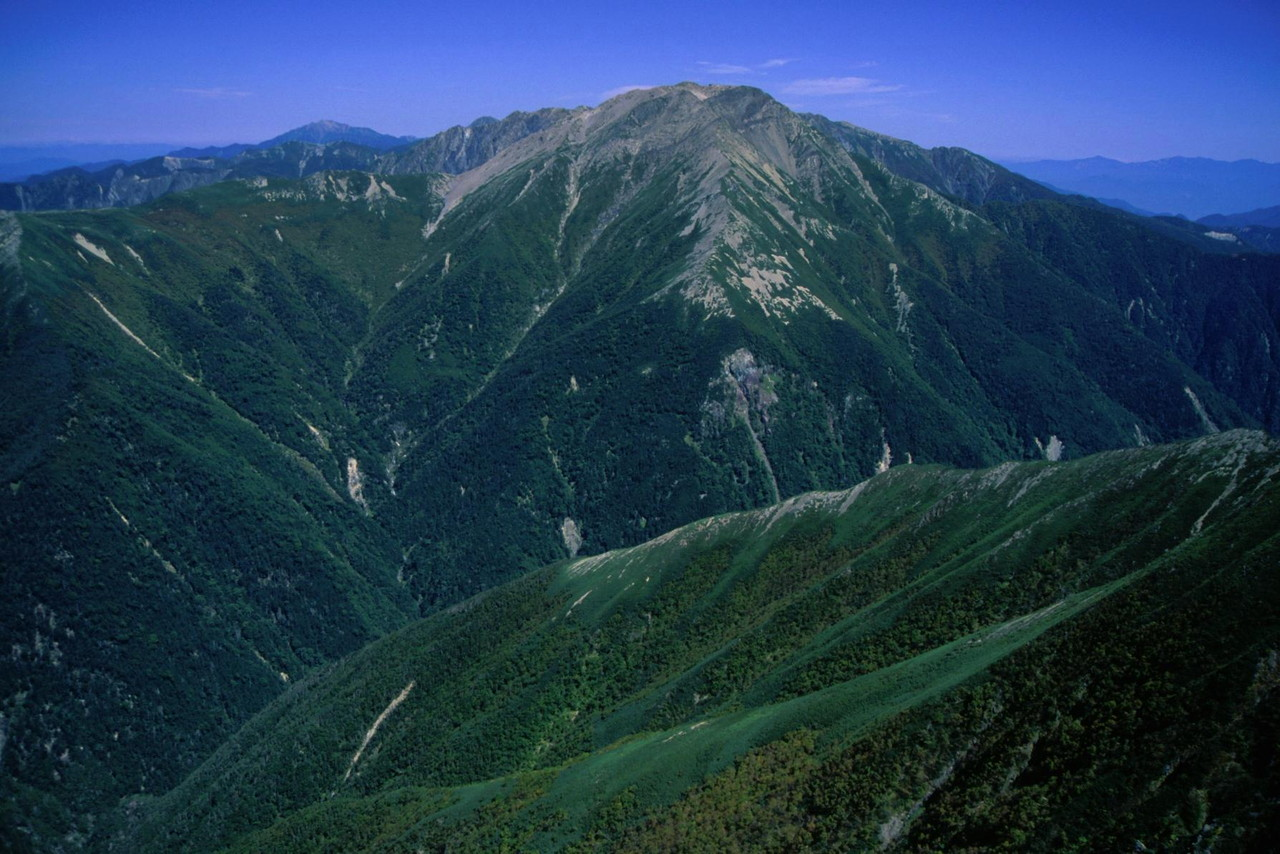
Mount Akaishi seen from Mount Hijiri

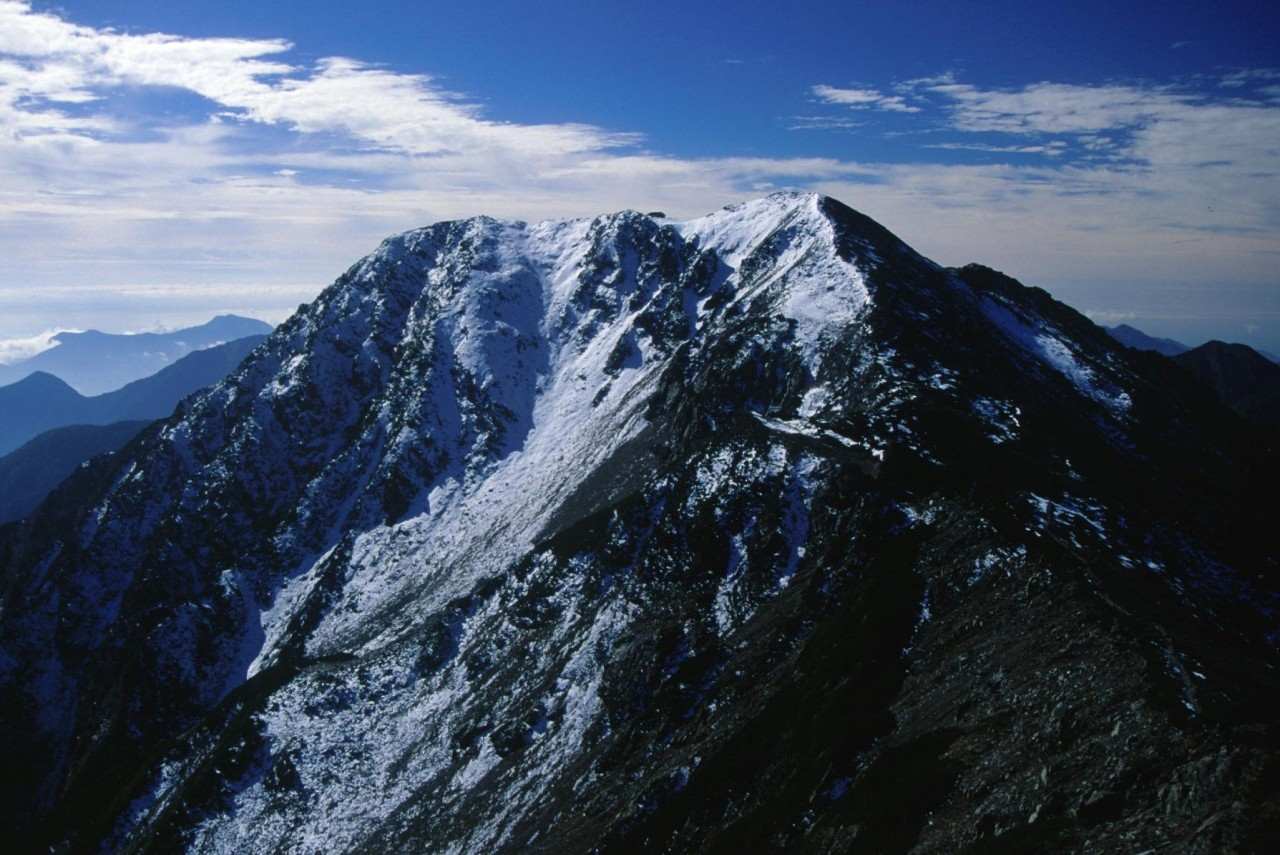
Mount Akaishi seen from Mount Ko-Akaishi

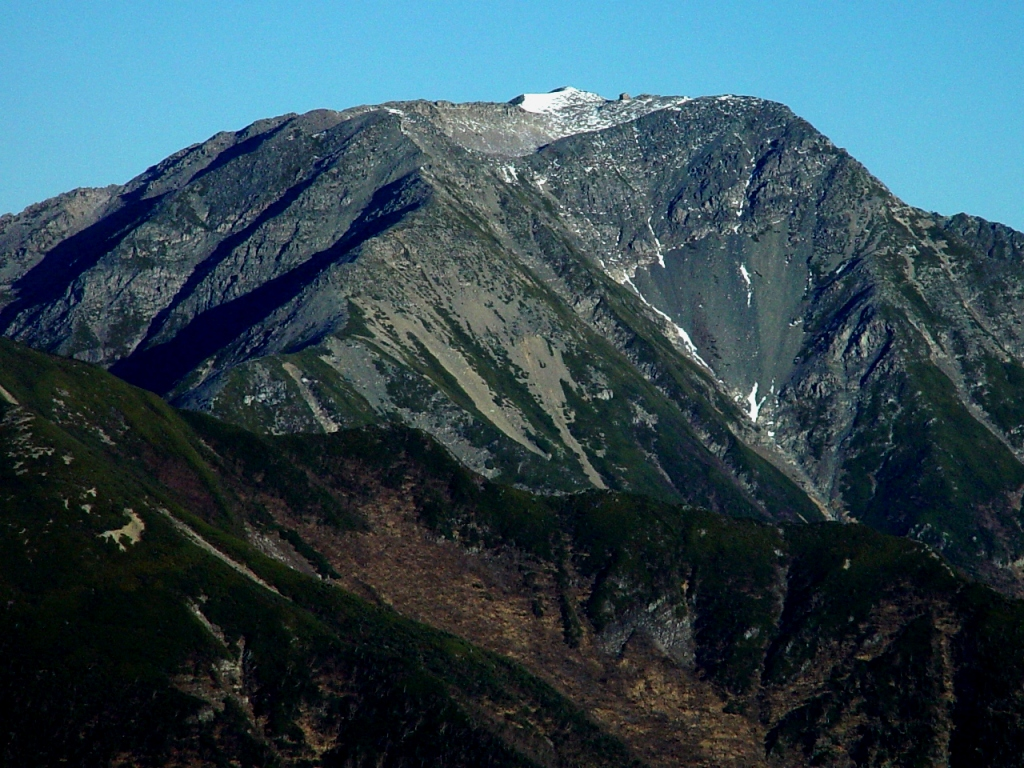
Mount Akaishi seen from Mount Kamikochi, The Mountain hut can be seen at the peak.

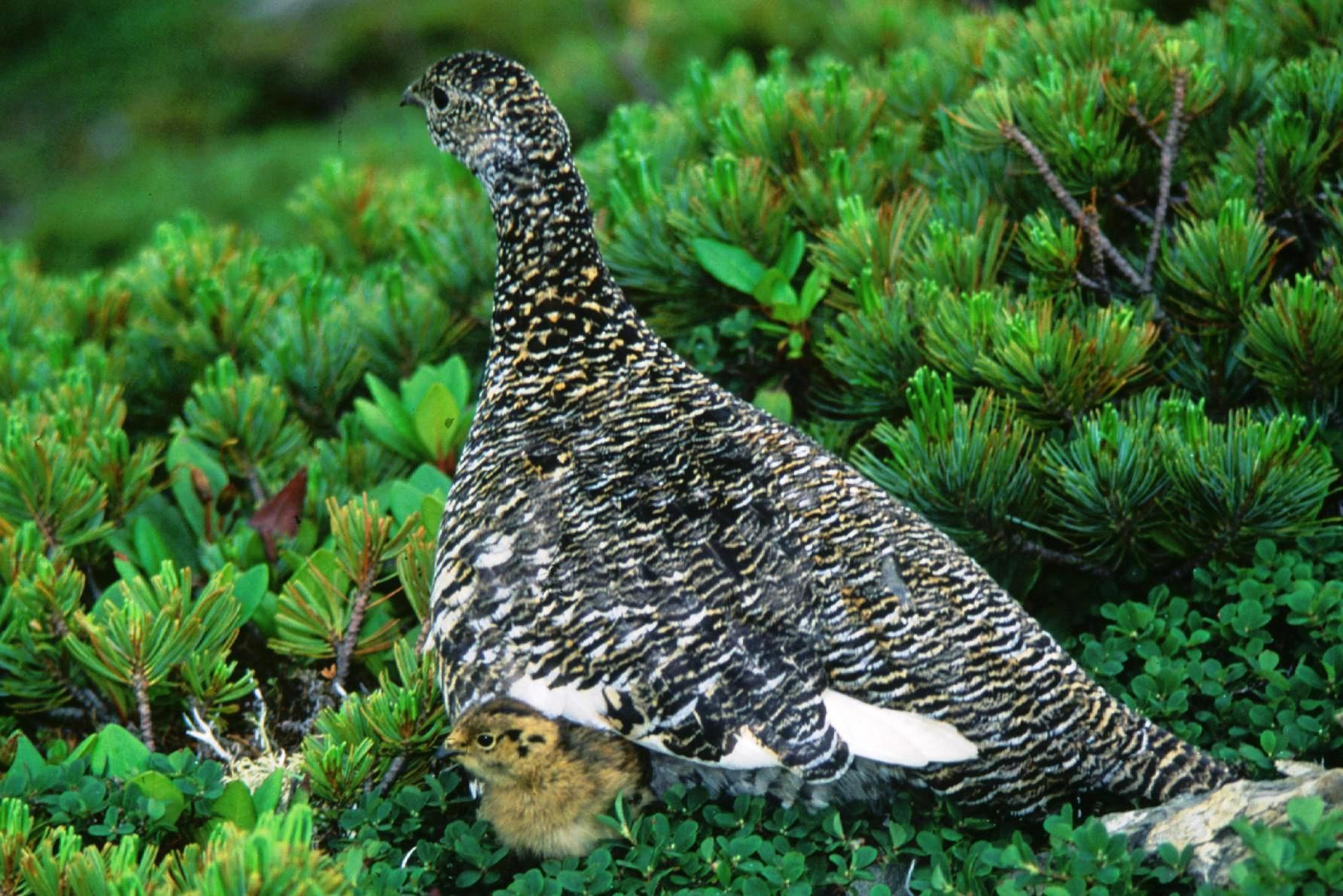
Rock Ptarmigan (mother and child) and Siberian Dwarf Pine in Mount Akaishi

== See also ==
- 53157 Akaishidake
- Akaishi Mountains
- Minami Alps National Park
- List of mountains in Japan
- 100 Famous Japanese Mountains
- Three-thousanders (in Japan)
