= Mount Ōbami =

Mountain in Gifu and Nagano Prefecture, Japan

- 大喰岳
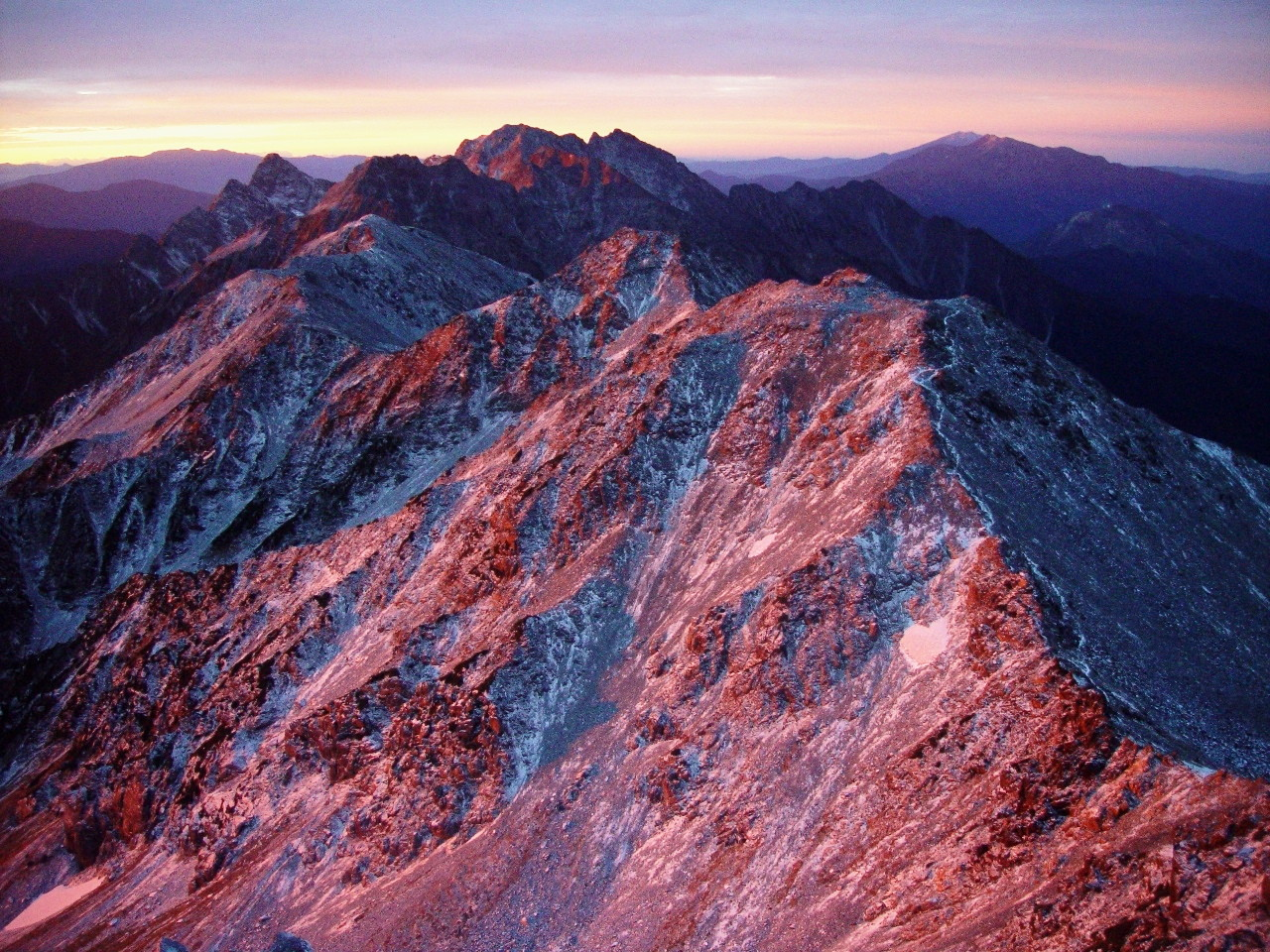
- View of Mount Ōbami from Mount Yari in 2003

Highest point
- Elevation: 3,101 m (10,174 ft)
- Prominence: 81 m (266 ft)
- Listing: Ultra
- Coordinates: 36°20′9″N 137°38′46″E

Naming
- Language of name: Japanese
- Pronunciation: [obamidake]

Geography
- Location within Japan
- Location: Takayama, Gifu Prefecture; Matsumoto, Nagano Prefecture; Japan
- Parent range: Hida Mountains

Mount Ōbami (大喰岳, Hotaka-dake), also known as Mount Ōbamidake, is a mountain situated in Japan's southern Hida Mountains, on the border between the cities of Matsumoto, Nagano Prefecture, and Takayama, Gifu Prefecture. It is also located south of Mount Yari.

The name of the mountain is said to have come from the fact that it was called Big Eat by hunters because the herds of animals gathered around this area and devoured the mountain grass. Mount Ōbami is part of Chūbu-Sangaku National Park.

Nearby Mount Ōbami, Mount Yari has a ridgeline extending from north to south, east and west, and is called Kitakama-one, Higashi-kama-one, and Nishikama-one.The south side is not called Kama-one, but it has a series of peaks over 3,000 m, and along the way there are Mt. Okumidate, as well as Mount Naka (3,084 m) and Mount Minami (3,033 m), and continues to the Hotaka Mountain Range via Oquilet. These are the result of the valley topography and ground uplift caused by ice erosion.

== History ==
In August 1909, a party including Masao Udono, accompanied by Kamonji Kamijo, climbed the mountain while traversing from Mt. Okuhotaka to Mt. Yarigatake. The area near the summit is a sandy gravel area at the treeline, which is a habitat for grouse, and alpine plants can be seen in the surrounding area, such as Japanese porcupine, Iwagikyou, Chōnosukeso, Eurasian lily, Aquarium japonica, Eurasian algae, and Aquilegia.
