= Mount Shiomi =

Mountain in Japan

- 塩見岳
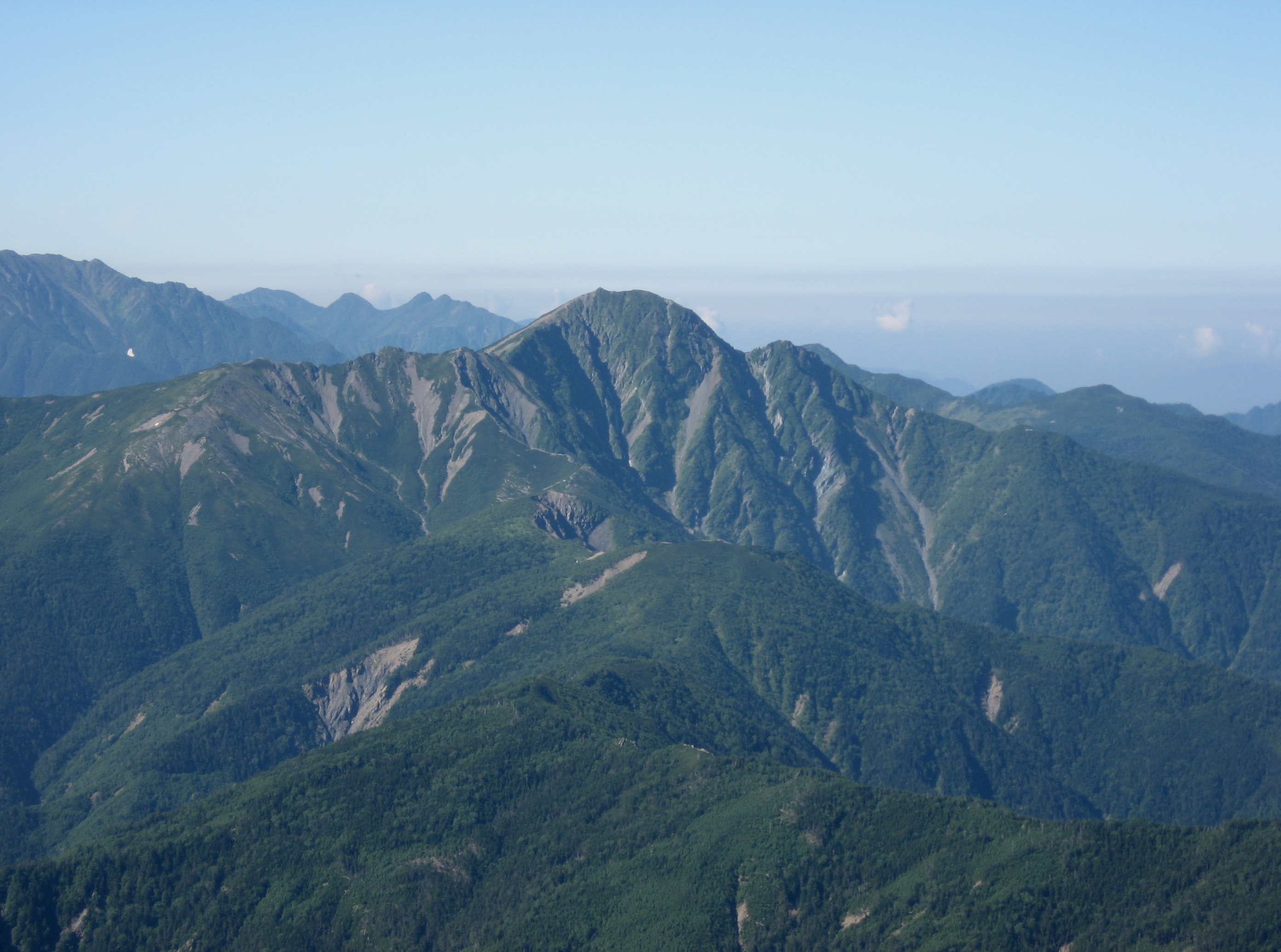
- Mount Shiomi seen from Mount Aino

Highest point
- Elevation: 3,047 m (9,997 ft)
- Prominence: 505 m (1,657 ft)
- Listing: List of mountains and hills of Japan by height
- Coordinates: 35°34′26″N 138°10′59″E

Geography
- Location within Japan
- Location: Chūbu region, Honshū, Japan
- Parent range: Akaishi Mountains

Climbing
- Easiest route: Hiking

Mt. Shiomi (塩見岳, Shiomi-dake) is a mountain located in the centre of the Akaishi Mountains−Southern Alps, within Minami Alps National Park, Japan. It is on the border of Shizuoka and Nagano Prefectures. It is one of the 100 Famous Japanese Mountains.

At 3,047 m tall, it is the 16th tallest mountains and hills of Japan. There is the mountaineering route on from a ridge in Akaishi Mountains.

== History ==
- 1902 - Toranosuke Ienaka climbed the top for the Surveying investigation. Afterwards, the Triangulation station was set up in the peak on the west side.
- 1964 - The Mount Shiomi region was specified for the new Minami Alps National Park.
- 1977 - Shiomi mountain hut was built on the west of the summit .

== Gallery ==
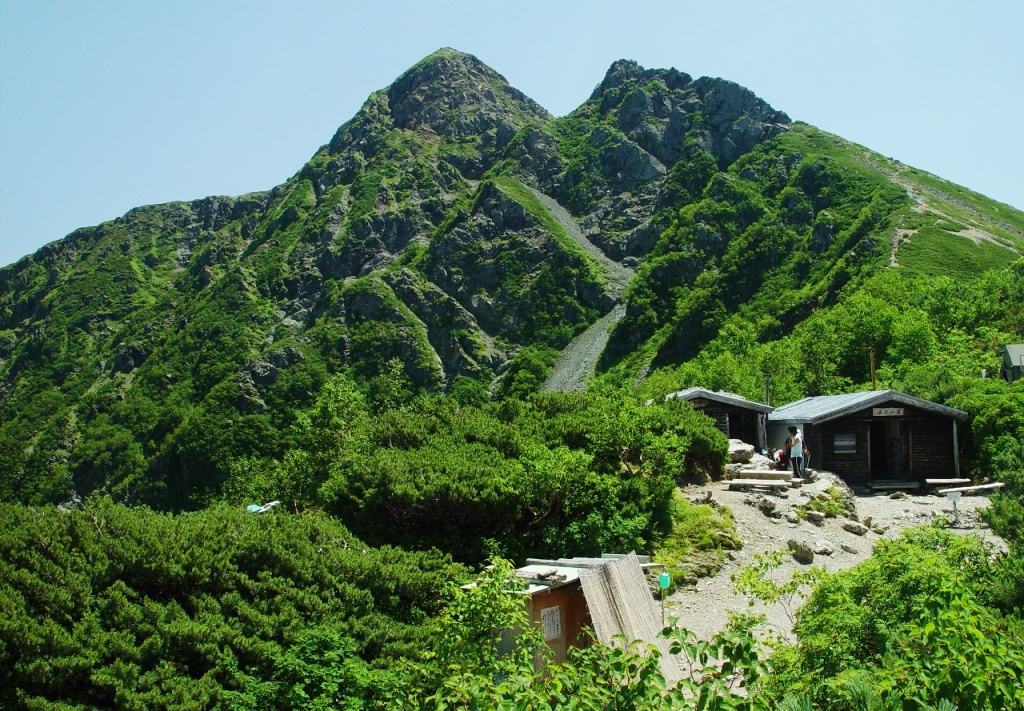
Shiomi Mountain hut and Mount Shiomi
(seen from west)

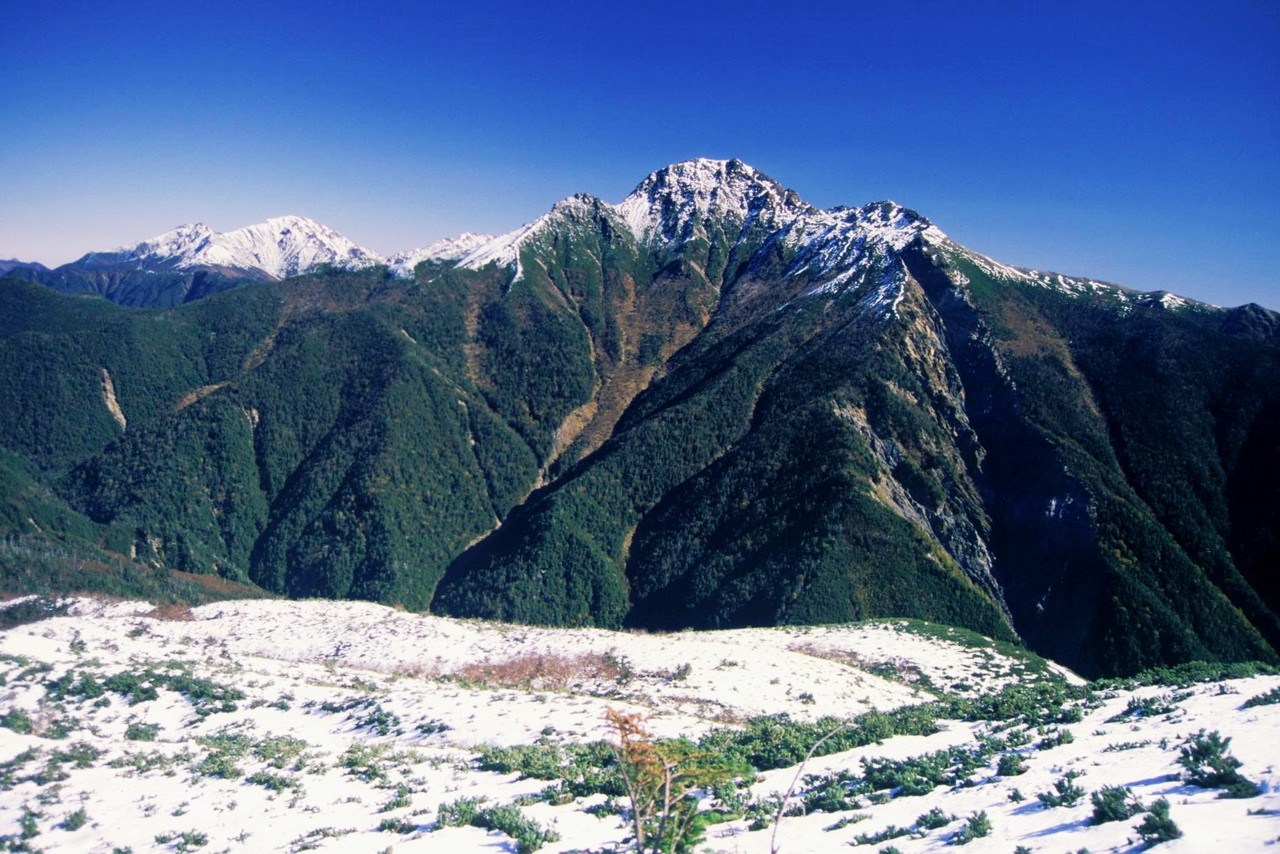
Mount Shiomi seen from Mount Eboshi
(seen from south)

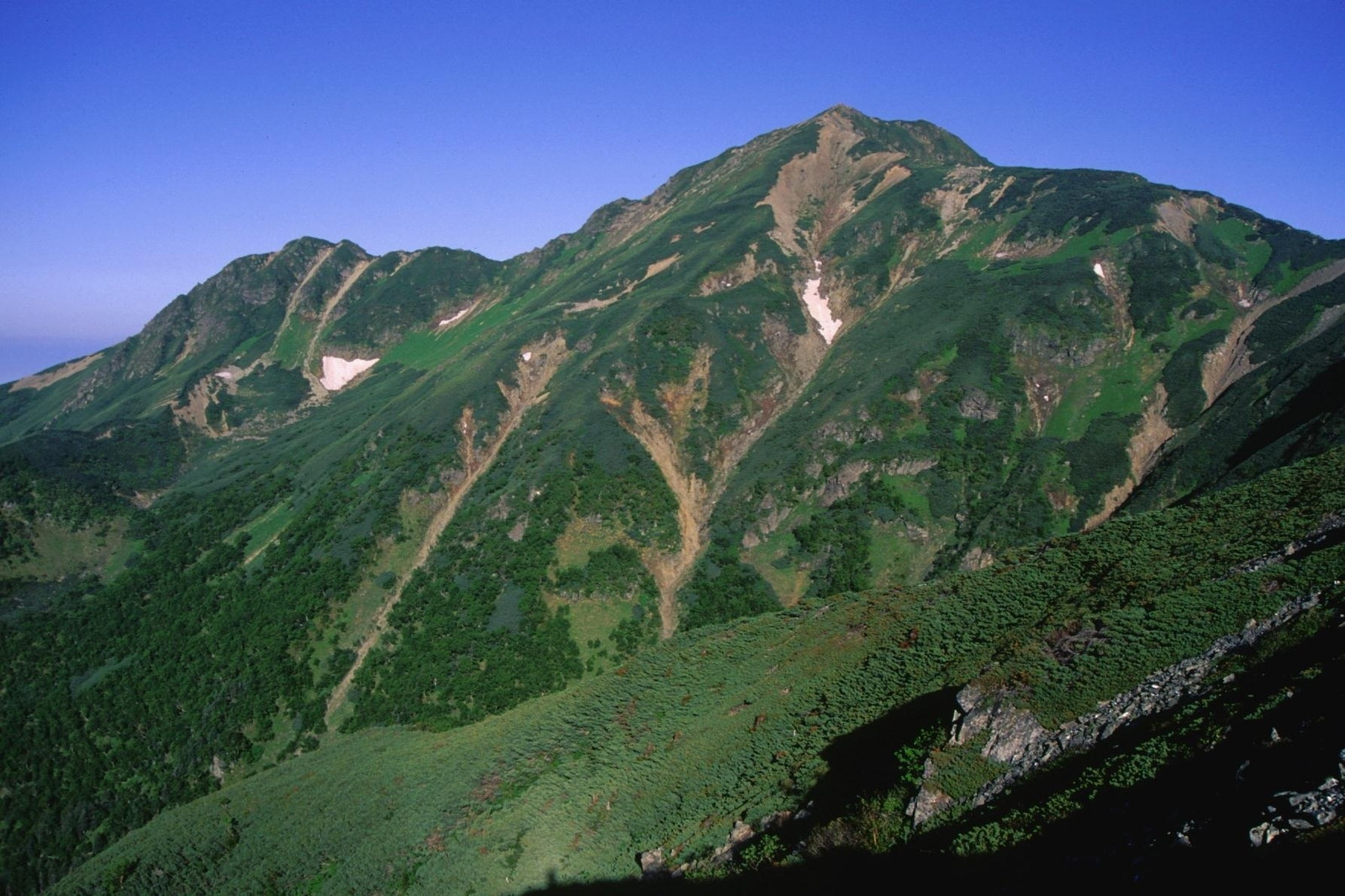
Mount Shiomi seen from Mount Kōmori
(seen from southeast)

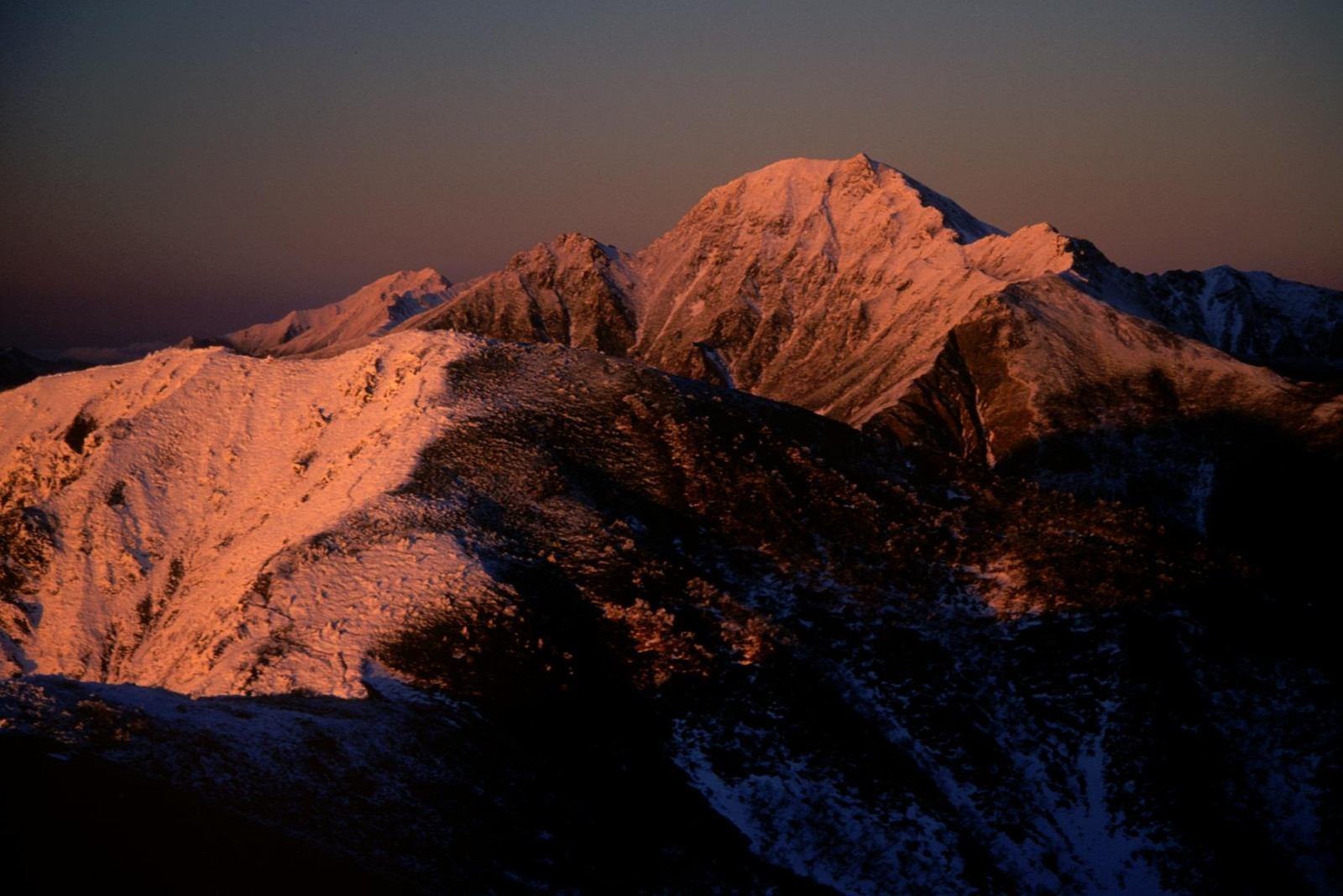
Mount Shiomi seen from Kogōchi
(seen from south)

== See also ==
- List of mountains in Japan
- 100 Famous Japanese Mountains
- Three-thousanders (in Japan)
- Akaishi Mountains
- Minami Alps National Park
