= Mount Kita =

Mountain in Yamanashi Prefecture, Japan

- 北岳
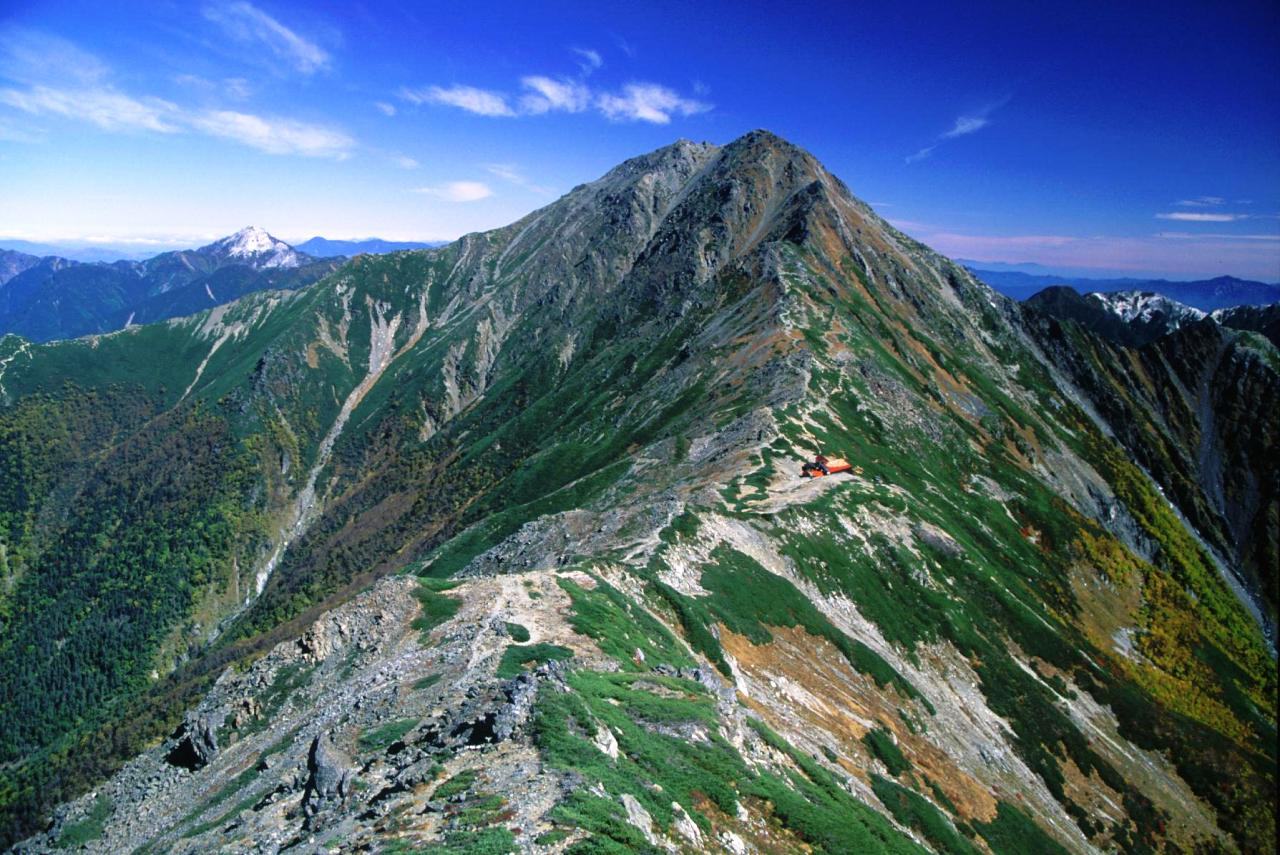
- Mount Kita viewed from Mount Nakashirane

Highest point
- Elevation: 3,193 m (10,476 ft)
- Prominence: 2,239 m (7,346 ft)
- Listing: 100 Famous Japanese Mountains; Ultra, Ribu
- Coordinates: 35°40′27″N 138°14′12″E

Naming
- English translation: northern peak
- Language of name: Japanese
- Pronunciation: [ki̥tadake]

Geography
- Location within Japan
- Location: Minami-Alps, Yamanashi Prefecture, Japan
- Parent range: Akaishi Mountains
- Topo map(s): Geographical Survey Institute (国土地理院, Kokudochiriin) 25000:1 仙丈ヶ岳, 50000:1 市野瀬

Climbing
- Easiest route: Hike

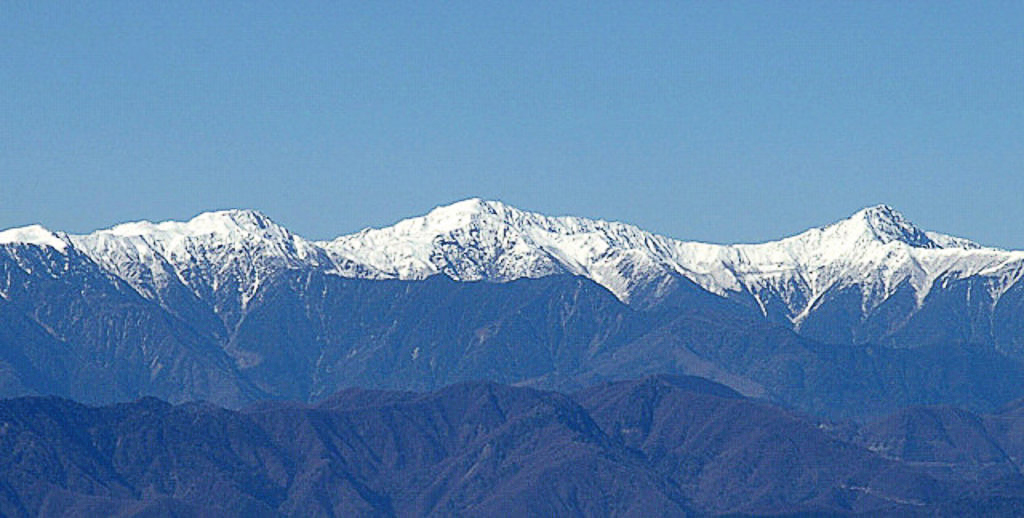
Shiranesanzan (from left to right: Mount Nōtori, Mount Aino, Mount Kita), view from Mount Kenashi in Shizuoka Prefecture (November 2006)

Mount Kita (北岳, Kita-dake) is a mountain of the Akaishi Mountains−"Southern Alps" (南アルプス Minami-Arupusu), in Yamanashi Prefecture, Japan.

It is the second highest mountain in Japan, after Mount Fuji, and is known as "the Leader of the Southern Alps". It is included in the 100 Famous Japanese Mountains. It is located in Minami Alps National Park, near the city of Minami-Alps, Yamanashi Prefecture.

== Geography ==
The Kitadake Buttress (北岳バットレス, Kita-dake Battoresu) is a 600 m (1,969 ft) tall rock face on the eastern side of the mountain.

Alpine plants grow abundantly, especially on the mountain's southeastern slope along the route to Mount Nakashirane (中白峰山, Nakashirane-san) and along the Kusasuberi (草すべり, kusasuberi) and Migimata (右俣, migimata) courses along Shiraneo Pond (白根御池, Shiraneo-ike) on the mountain's northern side. Large clusters of plants can be seen from huts near the top. The species Callianthemum hondoense (キタダケソウ, kitadakesō) is endemic to this mountain.

== See also ==
- List of mountains in Japan
- 100 Famous Japanese Mountains
- Three-thousanders (in Japan)
- Akaishi Mountains
- List of Ultras of Japan
