= Mount Norikura =

Potentially active volcano on the island of Honshu, Japan

- 乗鞍岳
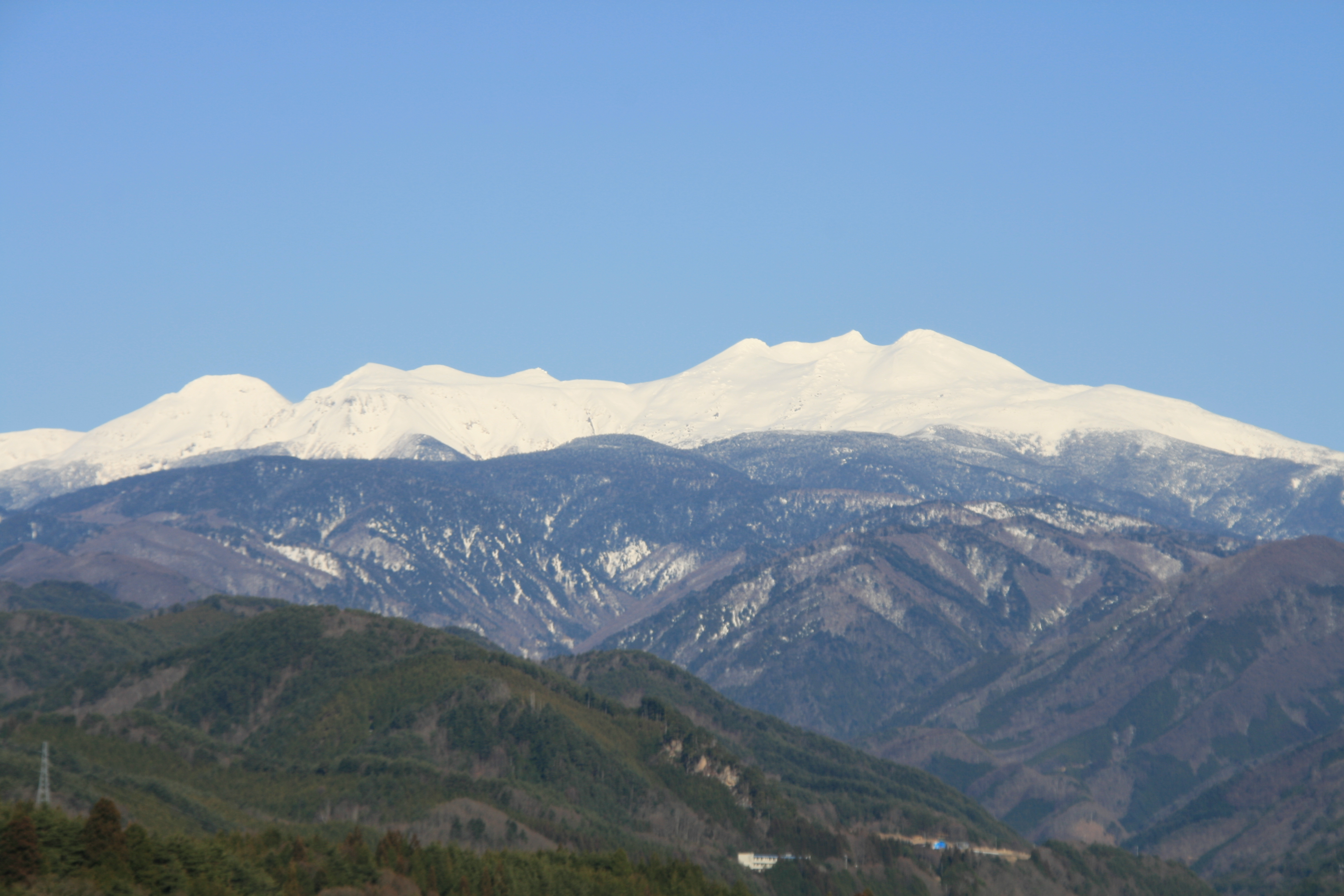
- Mount Norikura in spring

Highest point
- Elevation: 3,025.64 m (9,926.6 ft)
- Prominence: 1,236 m (4,055 ft)
- Listing: • List of mountains in Japan • List of volcanoes in Japan • 100 Famous Japanese Mountains • Ribu
- Coordinates: 36°06′23″N 137°33′13″E

Naming
- English translation: Riding Saddle Peak

Geography
- Location within Japan
- Location: Gifu Prefecture; Nagano Prefecture; Japan
- Parent range: Hida Mountains
- Topo map(s): Geographical Survey Institute, 25000:1 乗鞍岳, 50000:1 上高地

Geology
- Mountain type: Stratovolcano (active)
- Last eruption: 50 BCE (?)

Climbing
- First ascent: Enkū in the 1680s

Mount Norikura (乗鞍岳, Norikura-dake) is a potentially active volcano located on the borders of Gifu and Nagano prefectures in Japan. It is part of the Hida Mountains and is listed among the 100 Famous Japanese Mountains and the New 100 Famous Japanese Mountains.

== Outline ==
The mountain is located on the borders of Gifu and Nagano prefectures in Chūbu-Sangaku National Park.

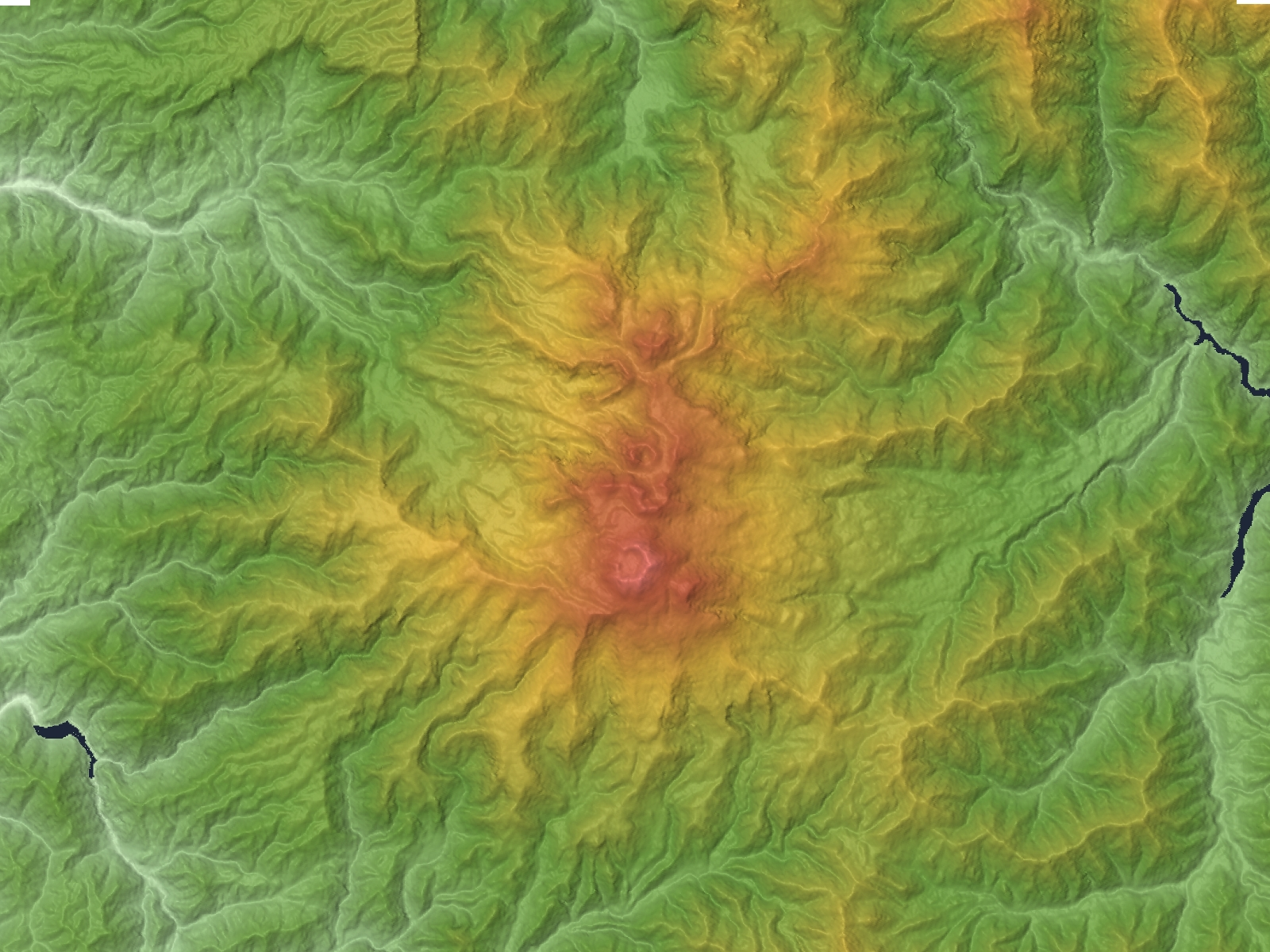
Relief map of Norikura volcano

The Norikura Plateau borders the mountain on its northern side in Nagano Prefecture. The mountain, whose name means "riding saddle," received its name because its shape looks like a horse saddle. It is known for being the easiest to climb among the mountains in Japan that are above 3000-meters.

== History ==
- 1680s - It is said that Enkū was the first to reach the peak.
- 1878 - Englishman William Gowland became the first non-Japanese man to reach the peak.
- 1892 - Englishman Walter Weston climbed on the peak.
- December 4, 1934 - This area was specified to the Chūbu-Sangaku National Park.
- 1973 - Norikura Skyline to the vicinity of the top of a mountain was opened. It is the road that exists in the highest place in Japan.

== Nature ==
After Mount Fuji and Mount Ontake, Mount Norikura is the third tallest volcano in Japan. It is a stratovolcano and hardened lava flows can still be seen near the peak. There are eight plains and 12 crater lakes on the mountain that were formed by volcanic activity. The Norikura Skyline is a road through the mountain, but it has to be closed for much of the year because of heavy snow fall. Even in the summer, some snow remains on the northeastern face of the mountain.

=== Plant and animal life ===
Mount Norikura has a variety of plant and animal life on its slopes. In addition to the alpine accentor and martins, the rock ptarmigan (one of Japan's natural monuments) also makes its home on the mountain.

There are various alpine plants and other flowers, including rhododendrons, lilies, and komakusa.

== Geography ==
=== Geological features ===
Mount Kengamine (剣ヶ峰 Kengamine), one peak on the mountain, was formed in two eruptions 9,600 and 9,200 years ago. Mount Ebisu (恵比寿岳 Ebisu-dake), another peak, was formed during an eruption 2,000 years ago. Though the volcano has lost some of its eruptive power, volcanic gas is still escaping through the Yū River (湯川 Yū-gawa) and there are many spa areas in the surrounding area.

=== River of source ===
Each following river of the source flows to the Sea of Japan or Ise Bay.

- Tributary of Azusa River that joins to the Shinano River
- Tributary of Takahara River
- Tributary of Hida River

== See also ==
- Chūbu-Sangaku National Park
- Hida Mountains
- Three-thousanders (in Japan)
- 100 Famous Japanese Mountains
- List of mountains in Japan
- List of volcanoes in Japan
- Volcano
