= Mount Warusawa =

Mountain located in the southern part of the Akashi mountains in Japan

- 悪沢岳
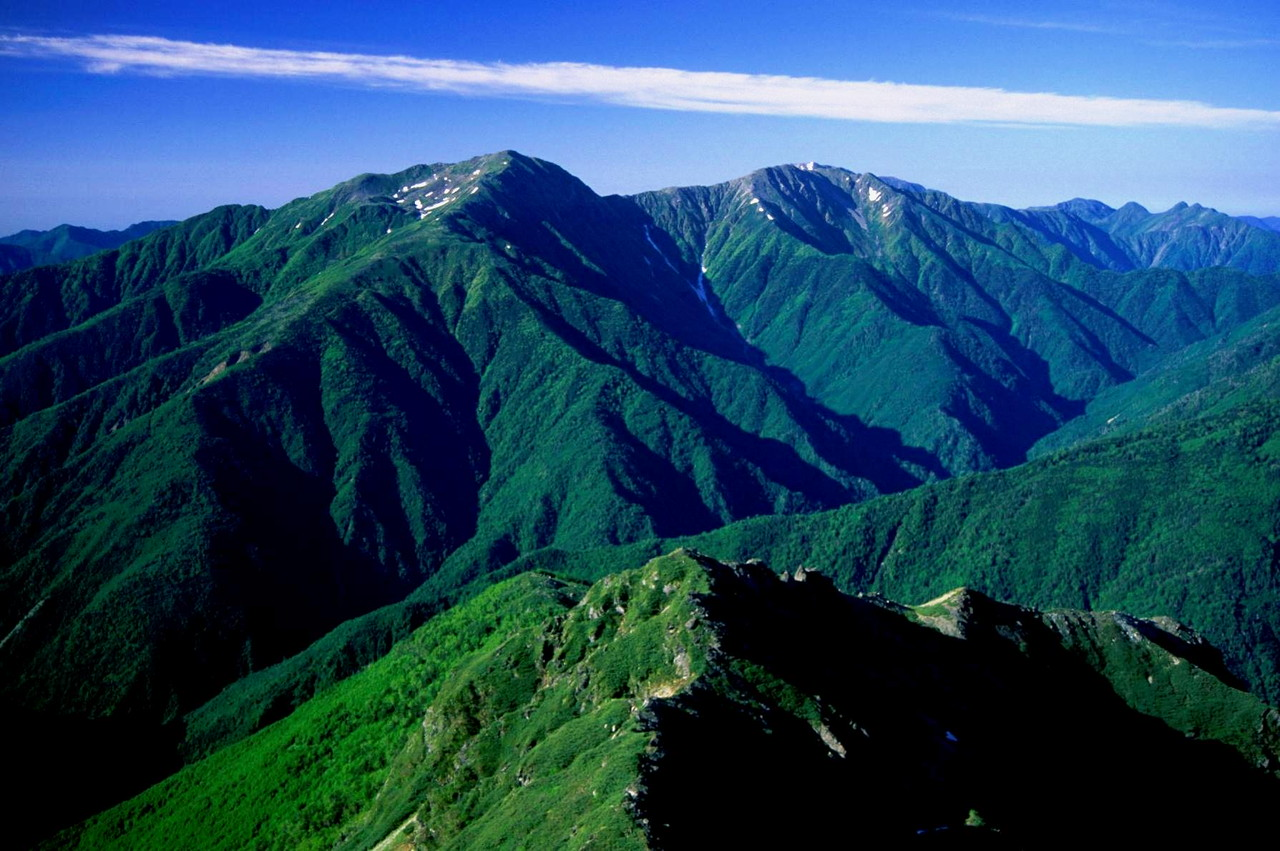

Highest point
- Elevation: 3,141 m (10,305 ft)
- Listing: List of mountains and hills of Japan by height
- Coordinates: 35°30′03″N 138°10′57″E

Geography
- Location within Japan
- Location: Japan
- Parent range: Akaishi Mountains
- Topo map(s): Geographical Survey Institute 25000:1 赤石岳; 25000:1 塩見岳; 50000:1 甲府

Climbing
- Easiest route: Hiking

Mount Warusawa (悪沢岳, Warusawa-dake), also Mount Higashi (東岳, Higashi-dake), is a mountain located in Shizuoka Prefecture, Japan. It has a height of 3,141 metres (10,305 ft). It is located in the southern part of the Akaishi Mountains, which are known as the "Southern Alps" (南アルプス Minami-Alps). It is located in the Minami Alps National Park.

== Arakawa 3 mountains ==
Mount Warusawa, Mount Arakawa-Naka and Mount Arakawa-Mae are called Arakawa 3 mountains.

Image	Mountain	Height	Position
	Mount Warusawa	3,141 m (10,305 ft)	in the east
	Mount Arakawa-Naka	3,083 m (10,115 ft)	at center
	Mount Arakawa-Mae	3,068 m (10,066 ft)	forward

== See also ==
- List of mountains in Japan
- 100 Famous Japanese Mountains
- Three-thousanders (in Japan)
- Akaishi Mountains
- Minami Alps National Park
