= Minami Alps National Park =

National park in Chūbu, Japan

- 南アルプス国立公園
- IUCN category II (national park)
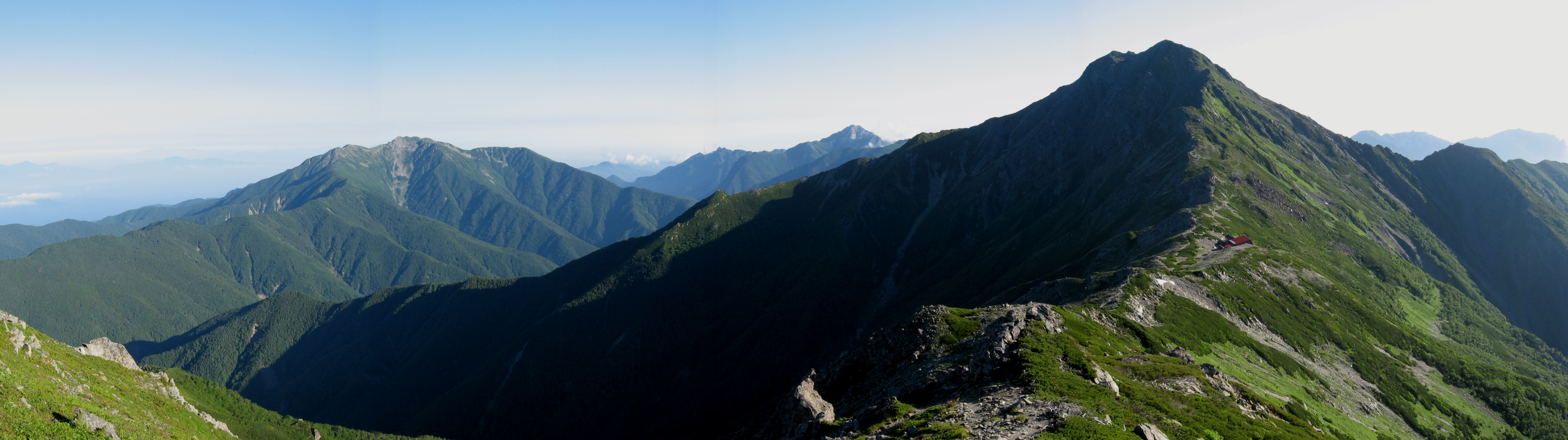
- Mt.Kitadake and Mt.Senjogatake from Mt.Nakashirane

- Location within Nagano Prefecture Location within Japan
- Location: central Honshū, Japan
- Nearest city: 35.46442679183983, 138.157109381337
- Coordinates: 35°27′51″N 138°09′25″E
- Area: 357.52 km^{2} (138.04 sq mi)
- Established: June 1, 1964
- Governing body: Ministry of the Environment

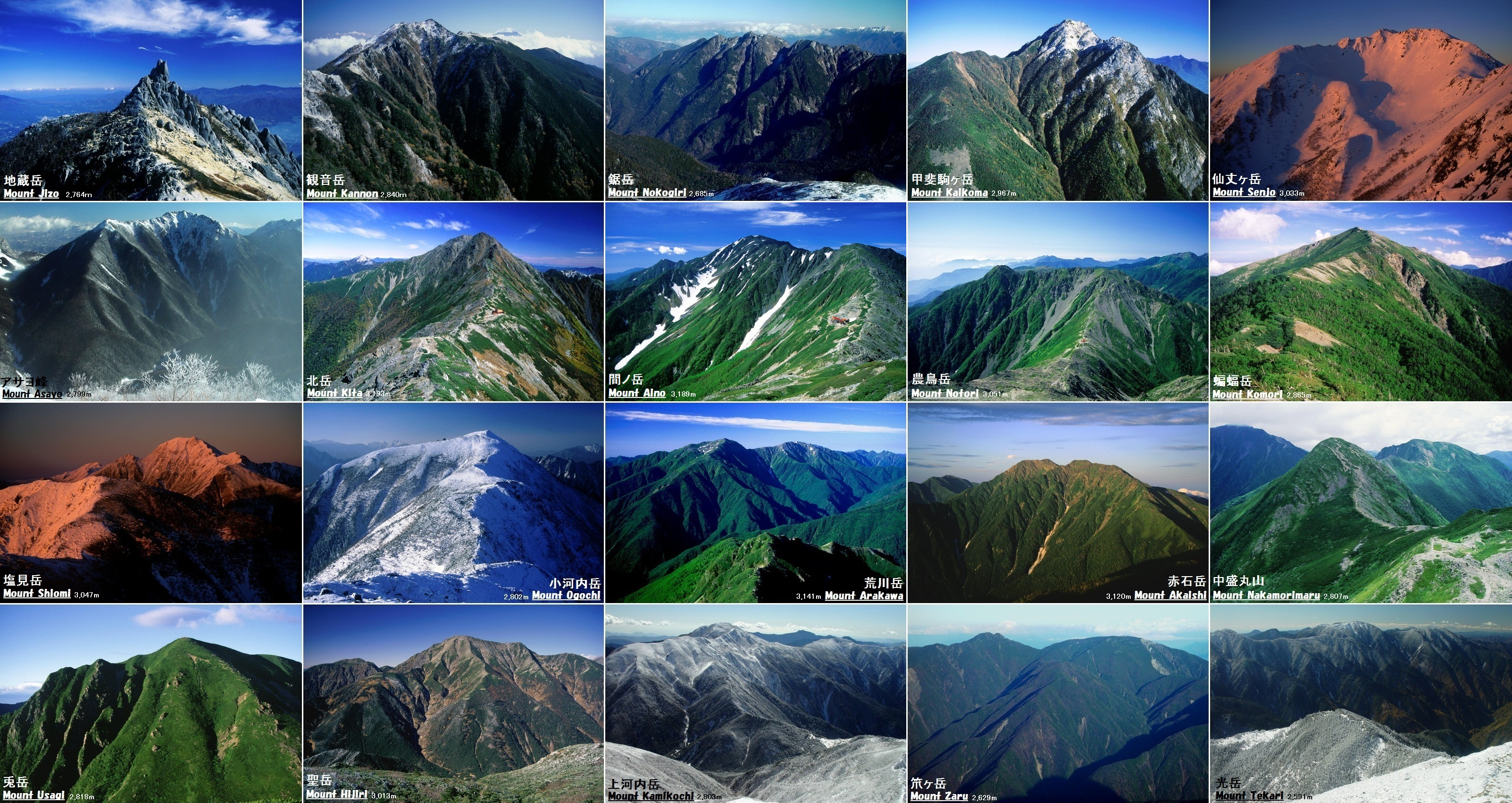
Each Mountain of Minami Alps National Park

Minami Alps National Park (南アルプス国立公園, Minami Arupusu Kokuritsu Kōen) is a national park in the Akaishi Mountains, Chūbu region, Honshū, Japan.

The Minami Alps National Park was established on June 1, 1964. It extends along the border of Shizuoka, Yamanashi and Nagano Prefectures for a length of 55 kilometres (34 mi), and a maximum width of 18 kilometres (11 mi) for a total area of 358 square kilometres (138 mi^{2}).

The Park is a very mountainous region, centering on the Akaishi Mountains with several noted peaks of over 3000 meters in height, including Senjō-ga-take, Kita-dake, Aino-dake, Shiomi-dake, Arakawa-take, Akaishi-dake and Hijiri-dake.

The park also protects the headwaters of the Fuji River, Ōi River and Tenryū River.

Flora in the park includes extensive stands of Japanese beech, Japanese stone pine and hemlock spruce. The largest fauna is the kamoshika and noted avian species include the ptarmigan. The park has minimal public facilities, and the only approach is by mountaineering.

Other large fauna include Asiatic black bear, wild boar and Sika deer.

== See also ==
- Akaishi Mountains
- Japanese Alps
- List of national parks of Japan
