= Mount Minami =

Volcano in Hokkaido, Japan

- Location within Hokkaido

Highest point
- Elevation: 1,500 m (4,900 ft)
- Listing: List of mountains and hills of Japan by height
- Coordinates: 44°06′44.3″N 145°09′38.6″E

Geography
- Location: Hokkaidō, Japan
- Parent range: Shiretoko Peninsula

Geology
- Rock age: Middle Pleistocene
- Mountain type: stratovolcano

Mount Minami (南岳, Minami-dake) is a volcano located on the Shiretoko Peninsula in Hokkaido, northeastern Japan.
