= Mount Naka =

Mountain in the Hida Mountains of Japan

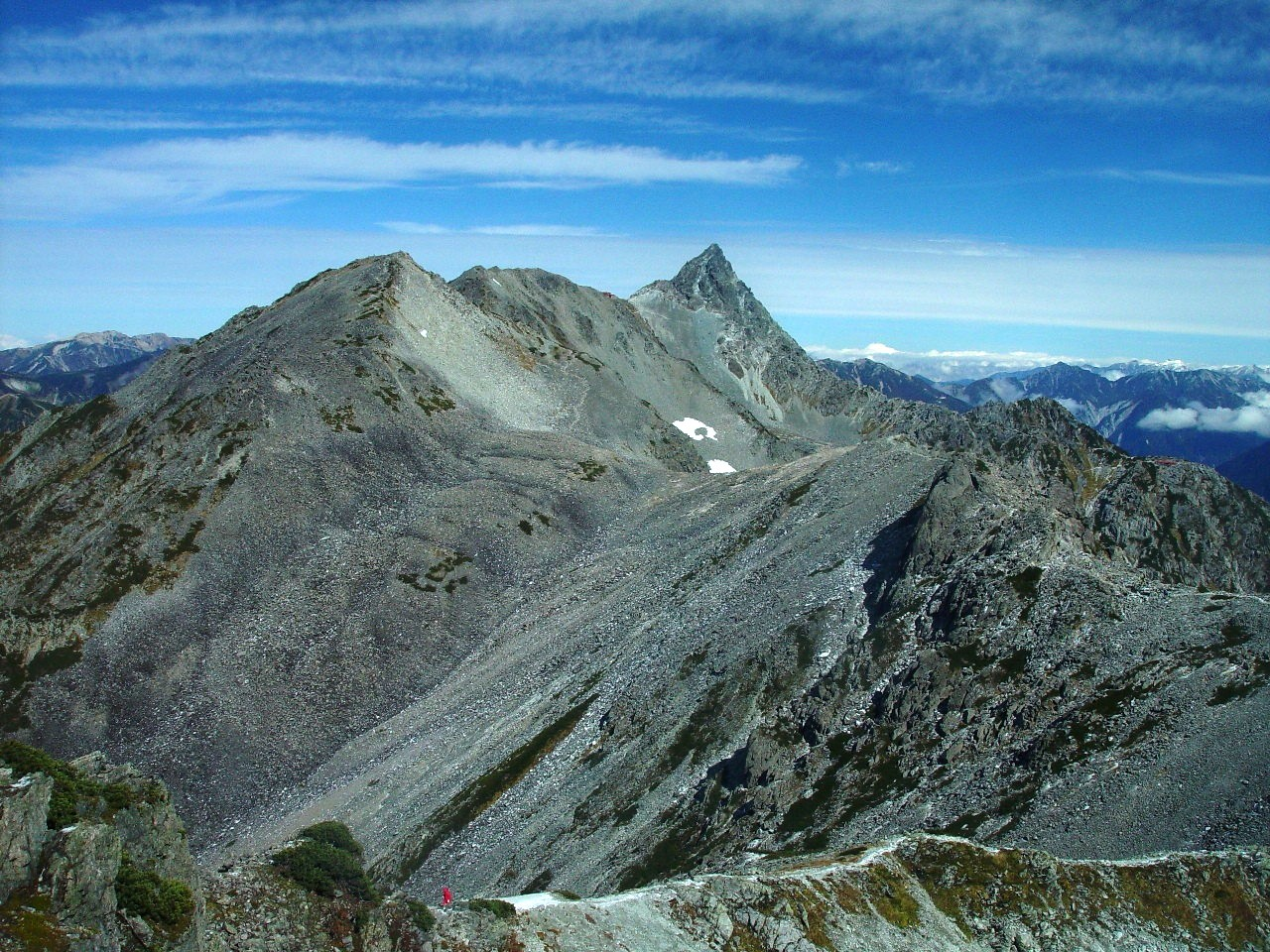

Highest point
- Elevation: 3,084 m (10,118 ft)
- Coordinates: 36°19′43″N 137°38′35″E

Geography
- Location within Japan
- Location: Chūbu-Sangaku National Park
- Country: Japan
- Prefectures: Nagano and Gifu
- Settlements: Matsumoto and Takayama
- Parent range: Hida Mountains

Mount Naka (中岳, Naka-dake) is a mountain with an altitude of 3,084m located in the southern part of the Hida Mountains, which straddles Matsumoto in Nagano Prefecture and Takayama in Gifu Prefecture. This mountain is located in Chūbu-Sangaku National Park.
