= Mount Kenashi (Yamanashi, Shizuoka) =

Mountain in the country of Japan

- 毛無山
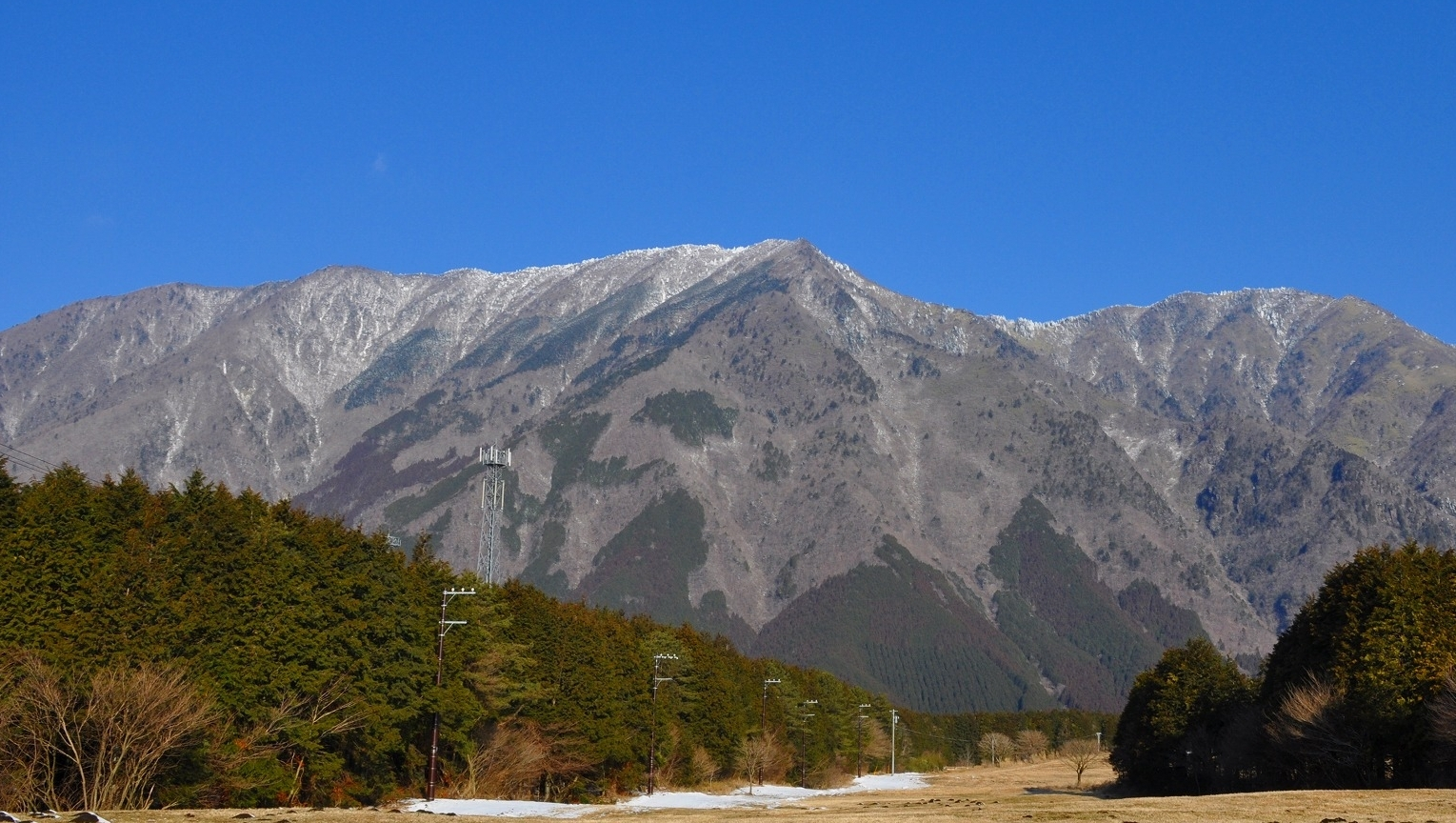
- A view from Fujinomiya City

Highest point
- Elevation: 1,964 m (6,444 ft)
- Coordinates: 35°24′57″N 138°32′38″E

Naming
- English translation: bald mountain
- Language of name: Japanese

Geography
- Location: Minobu, Yamanashi Prefecture; Fujinomiya, Shizuoka Prefecture, Japan
- Parent range: Tenshi Mountains

Geology
- Mountain type: massif

Mount Kenashi (毛無山, Kenashi-yama) is a 1,964 m (6,444 ft) mountain on the border of Yamanashi and Shizuoka prefectures in Japan. At the base of the mountain stretches the Asagiri Plateau, which stretches until Mount Fuji. It is the highest peak in the Tenshi Mountains.

== Naming ==
There are two stories behind the naming of the mountain, which have opposing meanings. The first story says that the name was derived from the mountain having absolutely no trees (木無し kenashi, lit. "treeless"). The second story says that the name came from the mountain having many trees (木成し kenashi, lit. "abundant trees"). Through the years, the kanji for the name has changed to the current 毛無, which means "hairless."

== Gallery ==
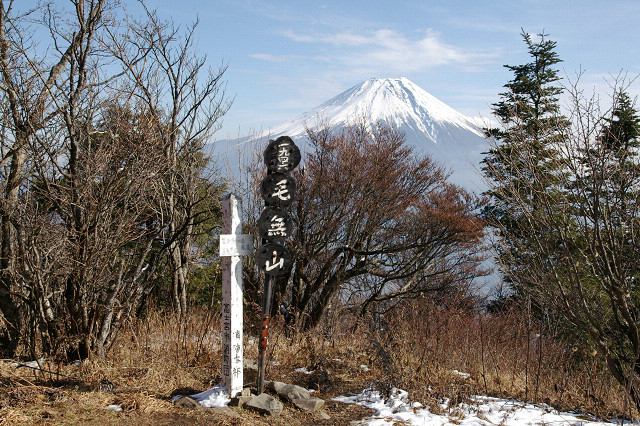
Peak of Mount Kenashi with Mount Fuji in the background

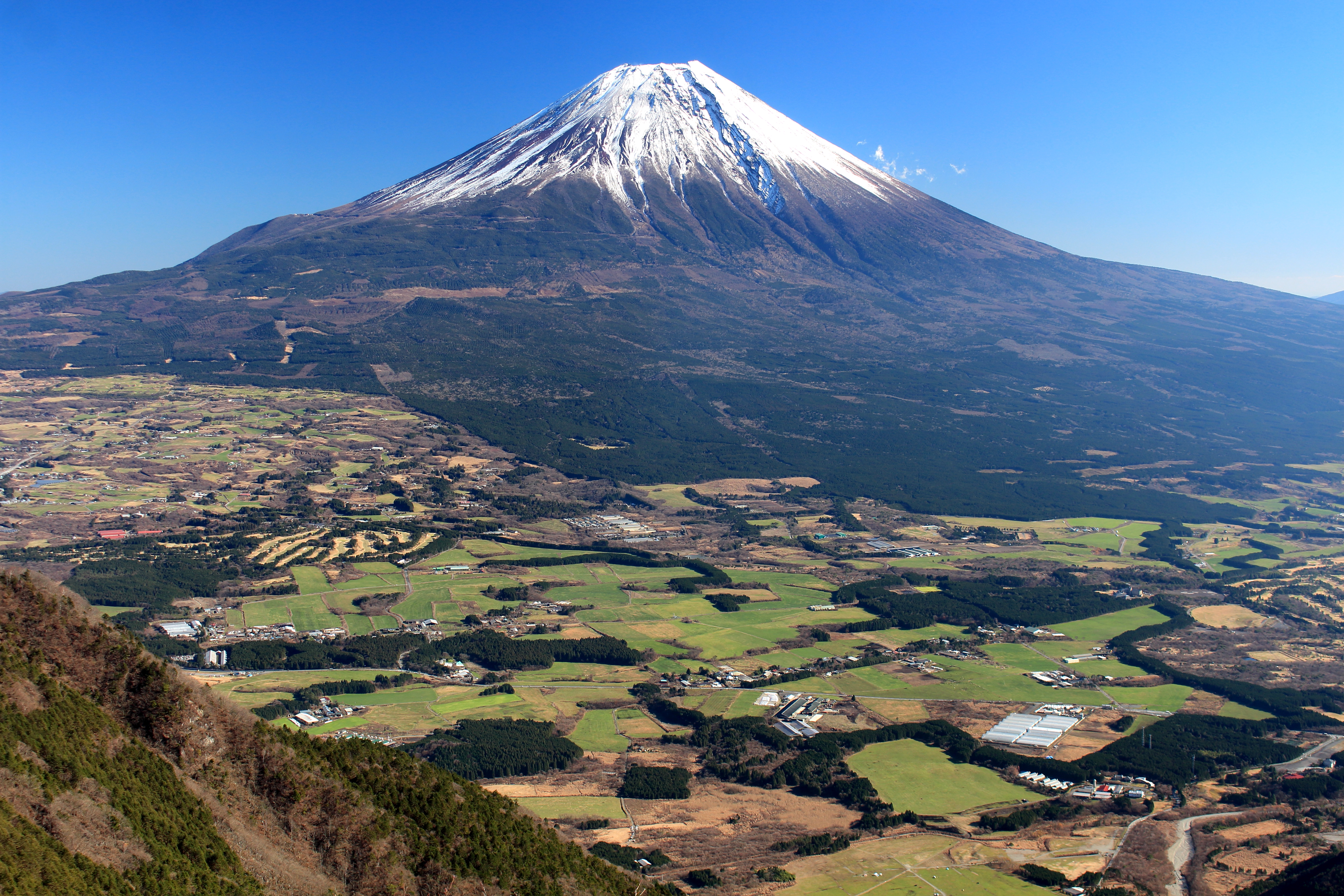
Mount Fuji and the Asagiri Plateau viewed from Mount Kenashi
