= Mount Washiba =

Mountain in Japan

- 鷲羽岳
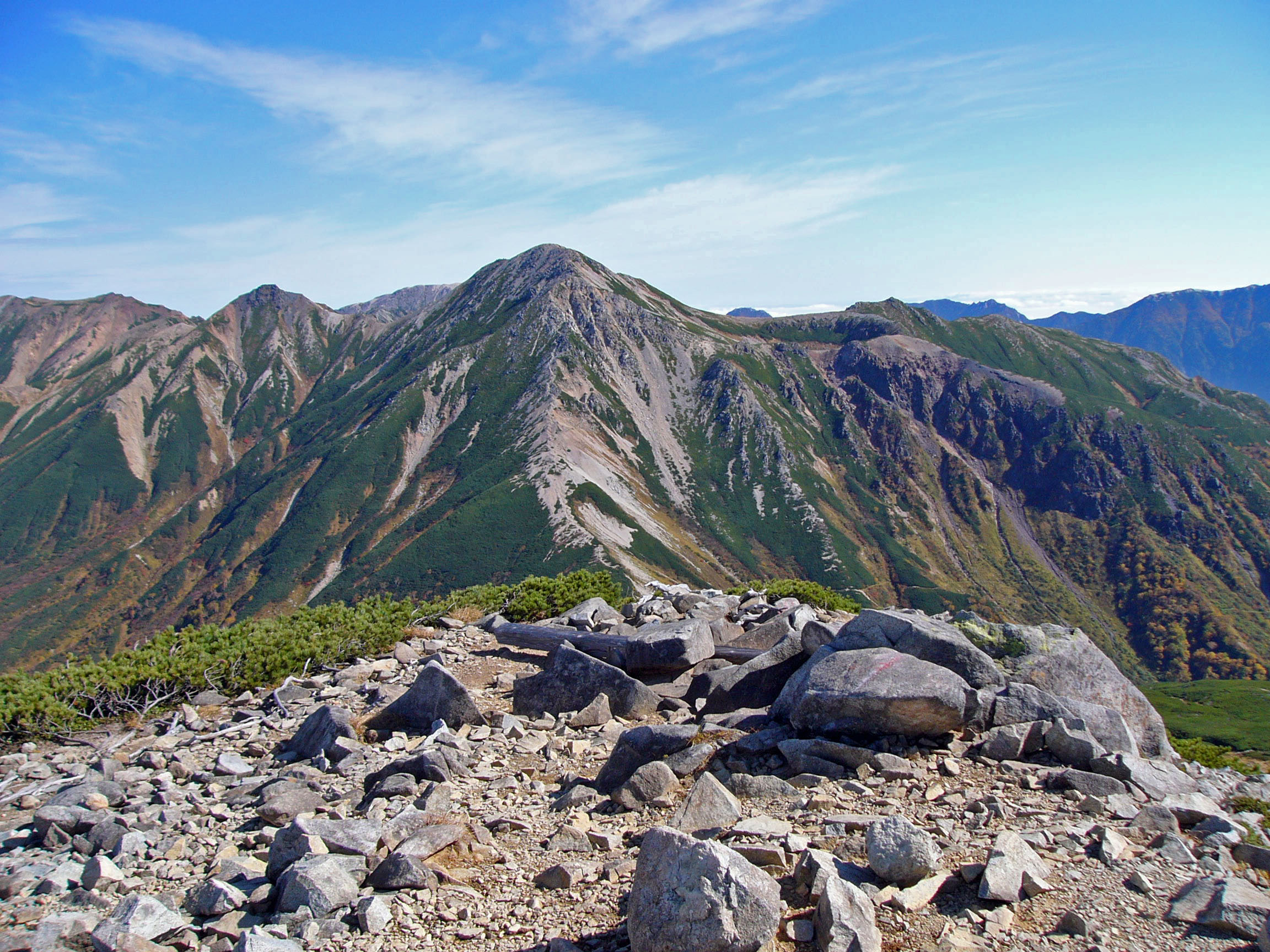
- Mount Washiba seen from Mount Mitsumatarenge

Highest point
- Elevation: 2,924 m (9,593 ft)
- Listing: List of mountains in Japan; 100 Famous Japanese Mountains
- Coordinates: 36°25′35″N 137°36′10″E

Naming
- English translation: Eagle wing Mountain
- Language of name: Japanese

Geography
- Location within Japan
- Location: Toyama Prefecture, Nagano Prefecture, Japan
- Parent range: Hida Mountains

Geology
- Mountain type(s): Stratovolcanoes, shield volcanoes, lava domes
- Last eruption: 12,000 years ago

Mount Washiba (鷲羽岳, Washiba-dake) is a peak and complex of volcanoes in the Hida Mountains range of the Japanese Alps at 2924m, located in Nagano Prefecture and Toyama Prefecture, central Honshu, Japan. It is listed in 100 Famous Japanese Mountains.

== Geography ==
Mount Washiba is the 29th-tallest mountain in Japan.

== Gallery ==
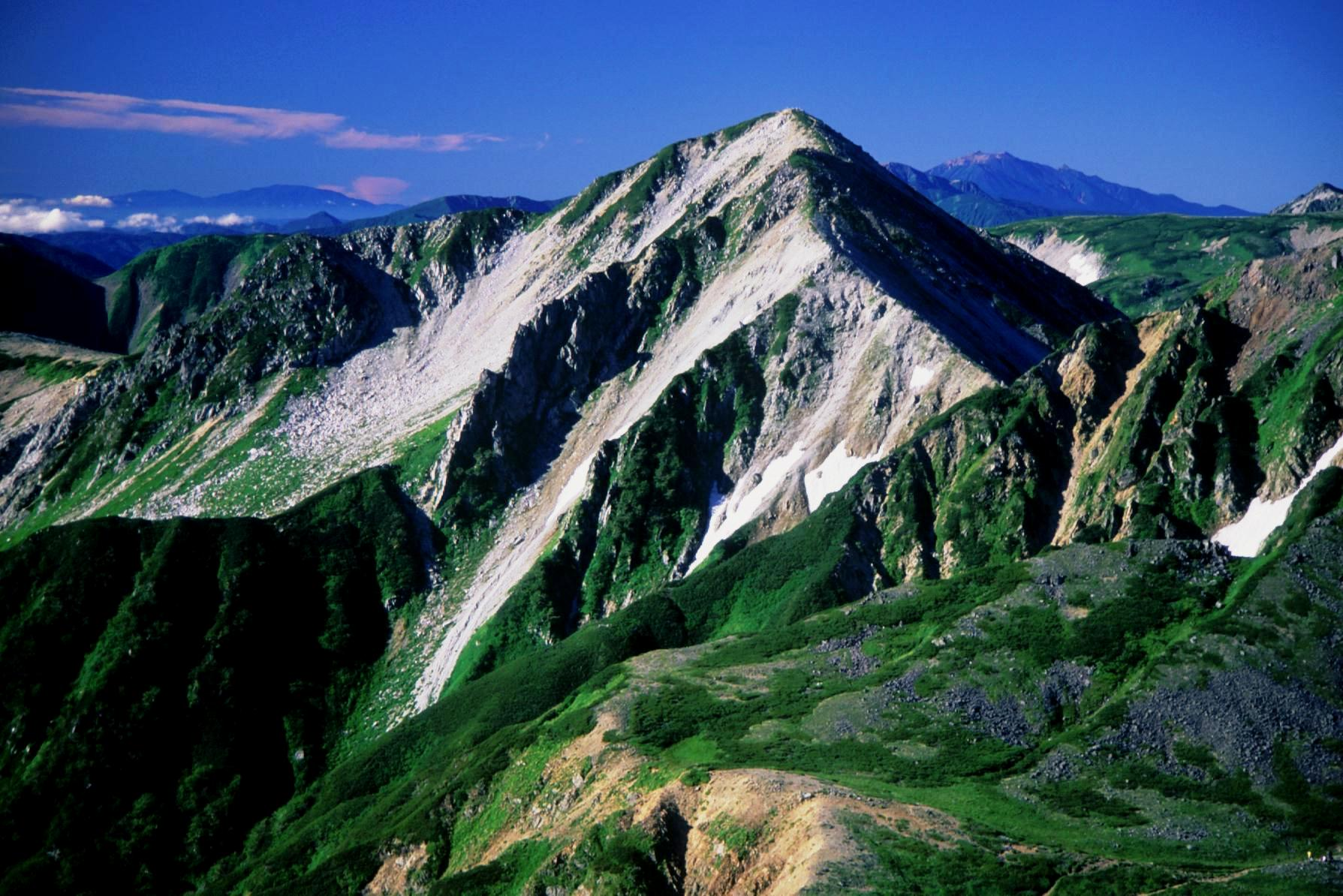
Mount Washiba seen from Suisho Mountain Villa

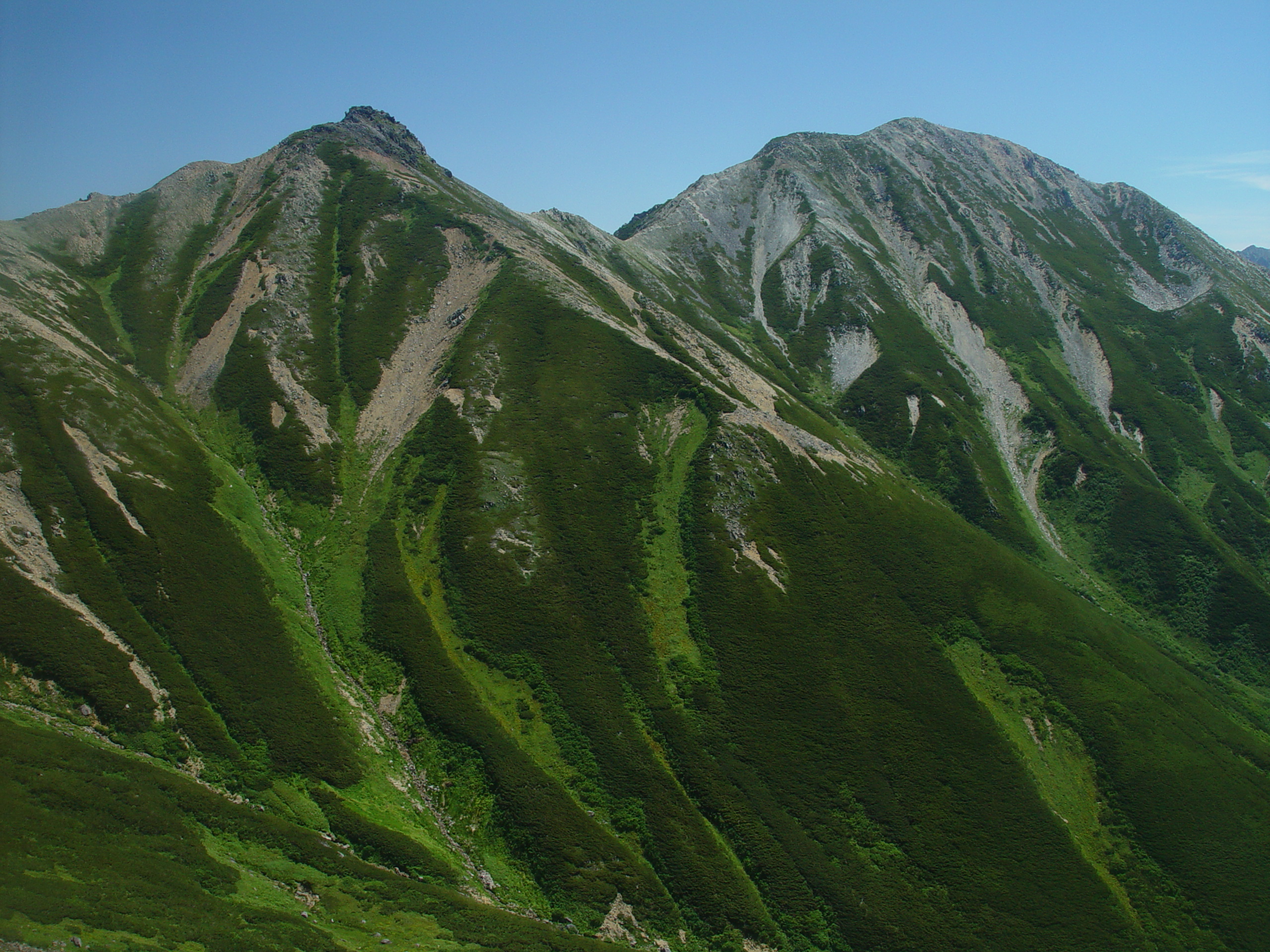
Mount Washiba seen from Mount Jii

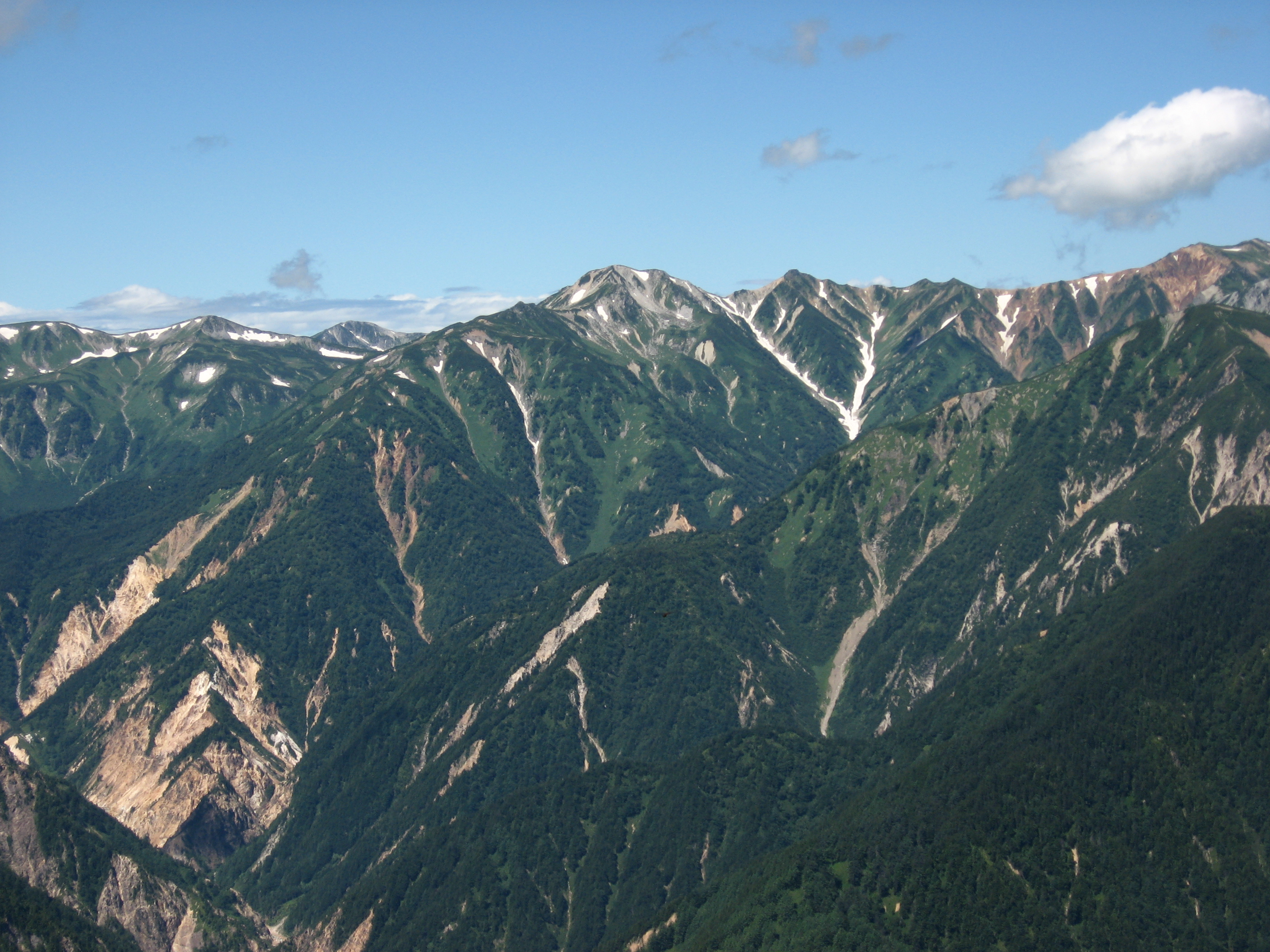
Mount Washiba seen from Tsubakuro Mountain Villa

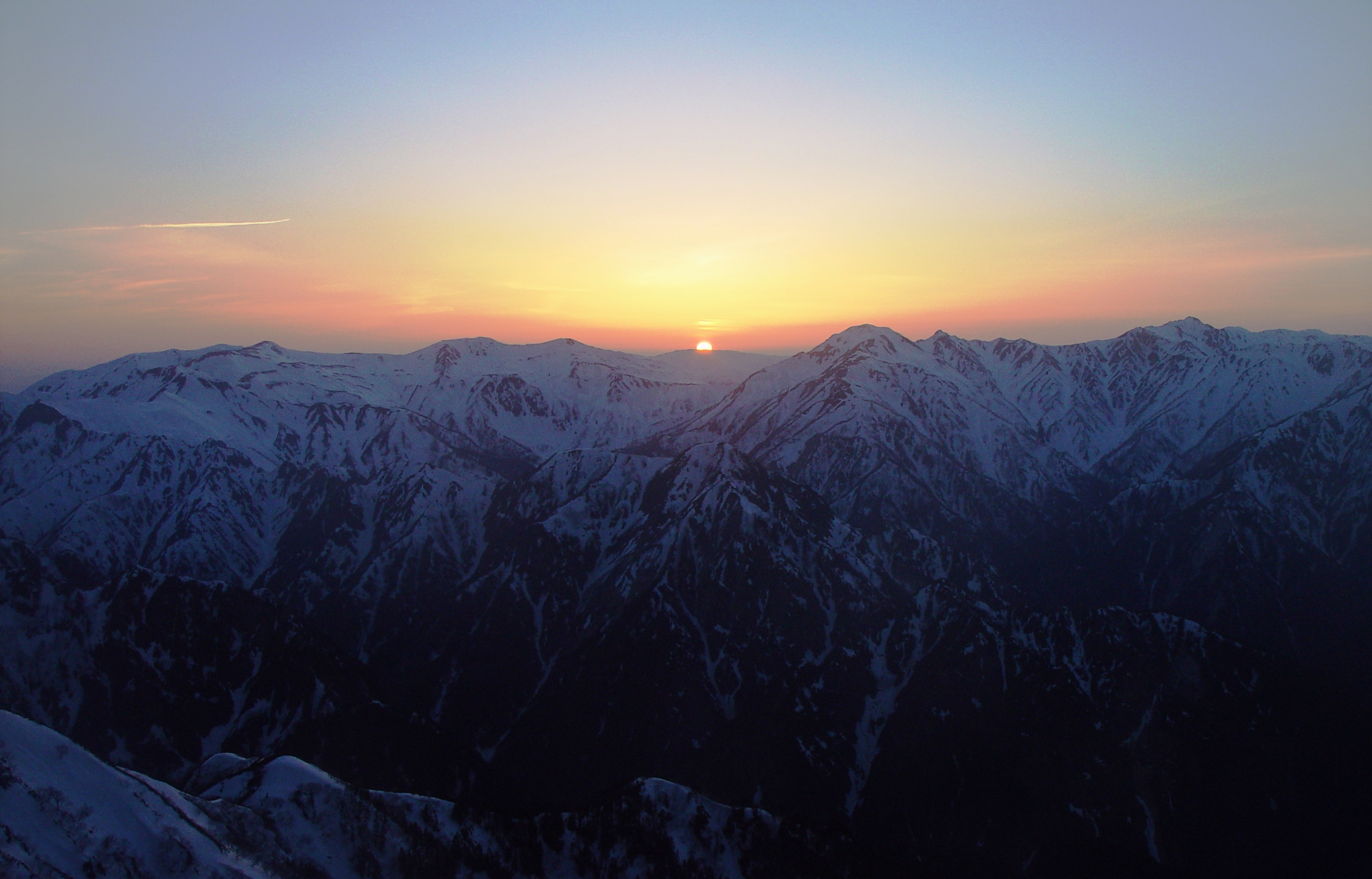
Mount Washiba seen from Mount daitenjo

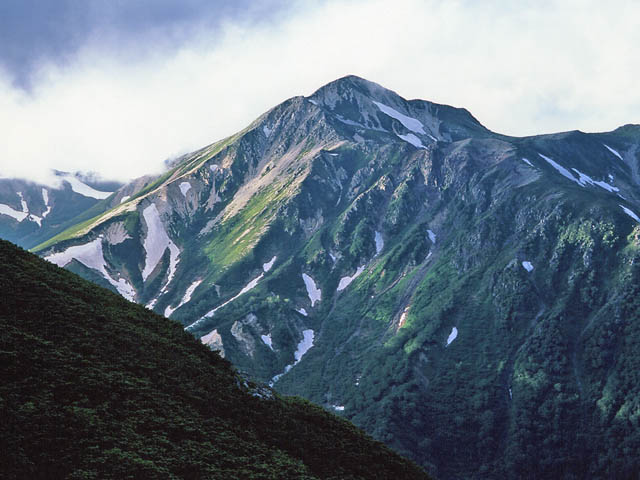
Mount Washiba seen from Sugoroku Mountain Villa

== See also ==
- 100 Famous Japanese Mountains
