= Mount Arashima =

Mountain in Japan

- 荒島岳
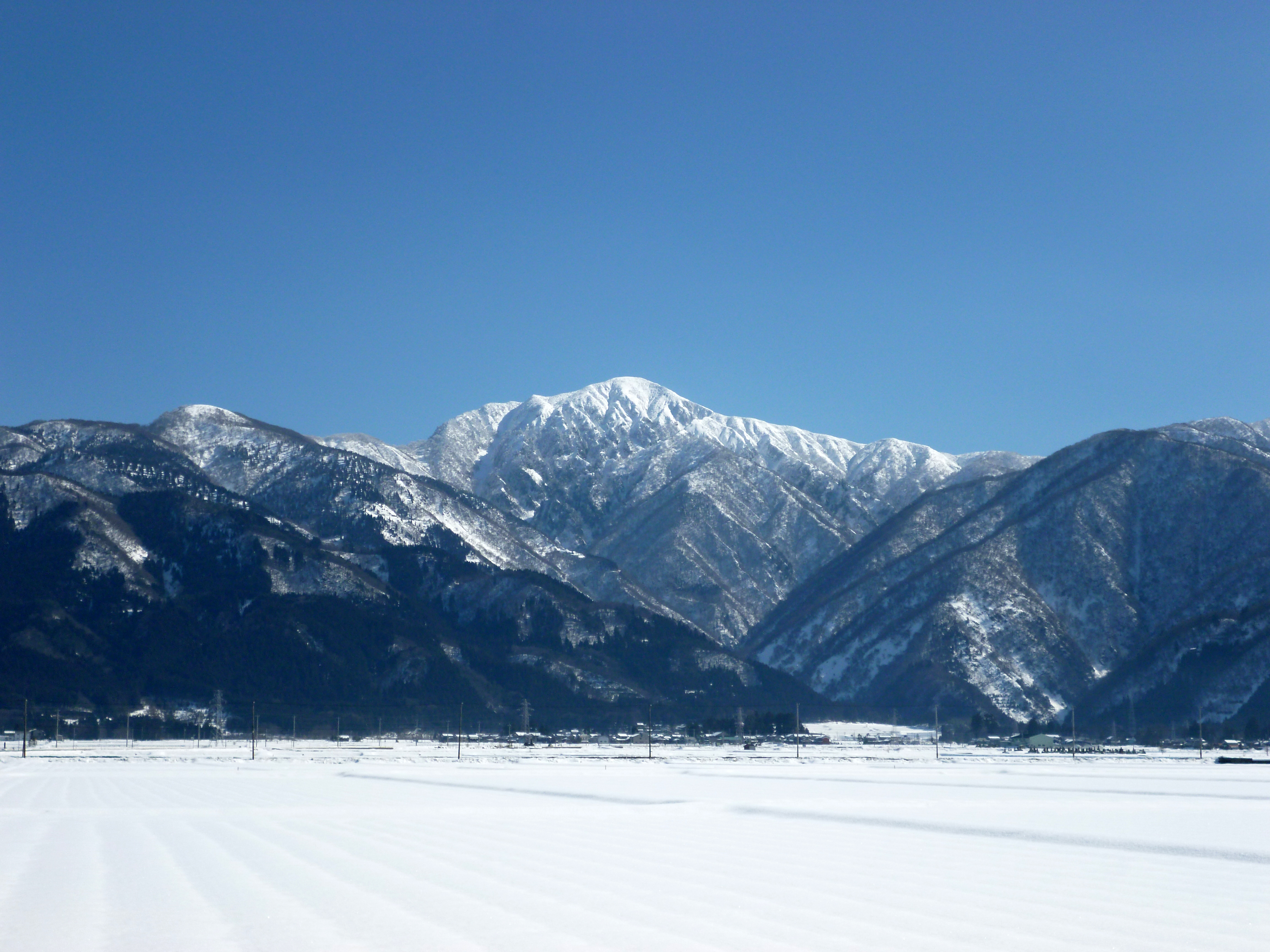
- View of Mount Arashima from Ōno

Highest point
- Elevation: 1,523 m (4,997 ft)
- Prominence: 743 m (2,438 ft)
- Listing: Mountains of Japan
- Coordinates: 35°56′03″N 136°36′05″E

Naming
- Language of name: Japanese

Geography
- Location within Japan
- Country: Japan
- Prefecture: Fukui
- City: Ōno
- Parent range: Ryōhaku Mountains

Geology
- Mountain type: Basalt

Mount Arashima (荒島岳, Arashima-dake) is a mountain located in Fukui Prefecture, Japan. This mountain is one of the 100 Famous Japanese Mountains.

== Outline ==
Mount Arashima has an elevation of 1,523 m (4,997 ft), and is located in the central Ōno, Fukui. It is not a volcano although it emerged from originally volcanic terrain. It is, over a long period, the product of erosion of a caldera formed in the Middle Miocene, when the Sea of Japan was developed.

== Vegetation ==
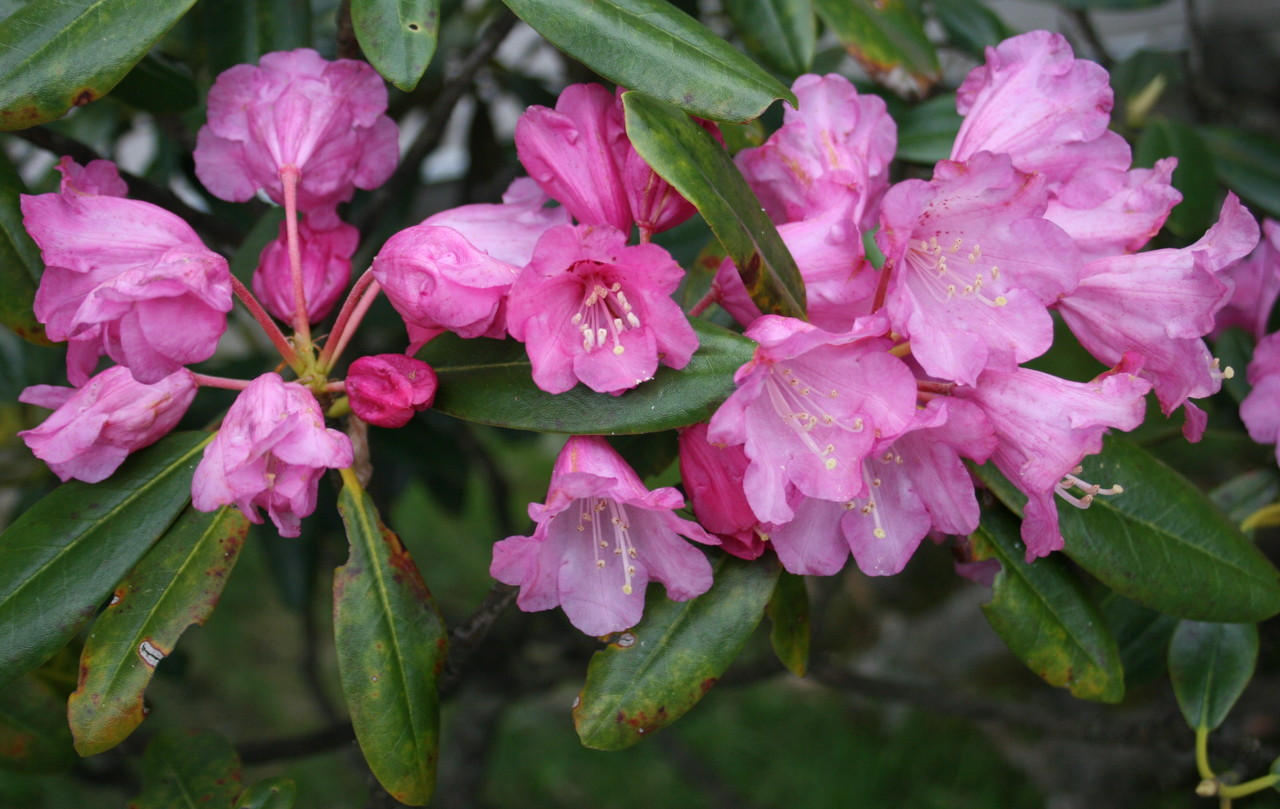
Rhododendron degronianum

The foot of Mount Arashima is covered in dense beech forest which, turning yellow in autumn, making the mountain stand out from the rest of the surrounding landscape.

The ascent of the north face, by the main hiking trail, leads to a plateau (at the elevation of about 1,200 m): Shakunage-daira (Rhododendron plateau), a place famous for the flowering of various species of azaleas in spring.
