= Mount Kurobegorō =

Mountain in the country of Japan

- 黒部五郎岳
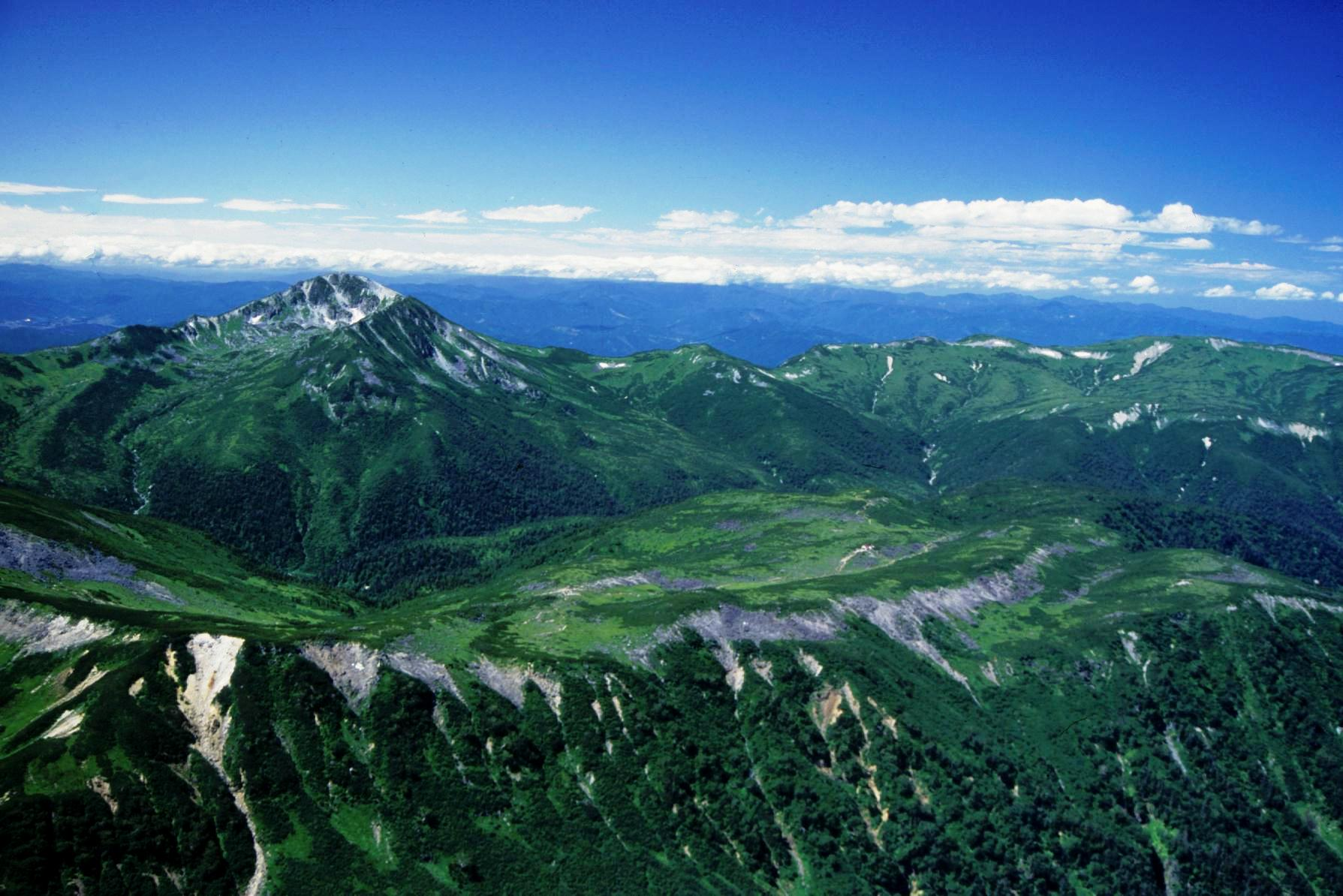
- Mount Kurobegorō and Kumonotaira seen from Mount Suishō

Highest point
- Elevation: 2,897.48 m (9,506.2 ft)
- Listing: List of mountains in Japan; 100 Famous Japanese Mountains
- Coordinates: 36°23′33″N 137°32′24″E

Naming
- Language of name: Japanese
- Pronunciation: [kɯɾobeɡoroːdake]

Geography
- Location within Japan
- Location: Takayama, Gifu Prefecture; Hida, Gifu Prefecture; Toyama, Toyama Prefecture; Japan
- Parent range: Hida Mountains
- Topo map(s): Geospatial Information Authority 25000:1 三俣蓮華岳; 50000:1 槍ヶ岳

Climbing
- Easiest route: Hike

Mount Kurobegorō (黒部五郎岳, Kurobegorō-dake) is one of the 100 Famous Japanese Mountains, reaching the height of 2,839.58 m (9,316 ft). It is situated in Japan's Hida Mountains in Gifu Prefecture and Toyama Prefecture. It was specified for Chūbu-Sangaku National Park on December 4, 1934.

== Outline ==
The origin of the mountain's name is the meaning that the stone rolls. It is called "gōro" in Japanese. This mountain is also located at the source of the Kurobe River. Then it is called "Kurobe-Gorō". On the hillside on the east side, there is a large Cirque geographical features that is a hollow where the earth was scooped out. The upper part of this mountain is situated in Tree line region, Siberian Dwarf Pine and Alpine plant grow naturally. There are quite a lot of kinds of alpine plants in the surrounding, and it is selected to "the 100 famous Japanese mountains of flower" by Sumie Tanaka.

== Mountaineering ==
In December 1931, Buntarō Katō of Japanese mountain climber climbed it alone.

=== Main ascent routes ===
There are several climbing routes to the top of the mountain.

- Hietsu-shin-dō
- Kamioka-shin-dō
- Arimine-guchi
- The west Ginza diamond course (from Oritate – Mount Kurobegorō – to Mount Yari)

There are the Ridge Line and Cirque routes from the Kurobegorō hut to the top.

=== Mountain hut ===
Thera are several mountain huts around Mount Kurobegorō.

- Kurobegorō hut (黒部五郎小舎, Kurobegorō-goya) – in the col between Mount Kurobegorō and Mount Mitsumatarenge (with Campsite)
- Tarōdaira hut (太郎平小屋, Tarōdaira-goya) – in the col between Mount Yakushi and Mount Tarō (with Campsite)
- Mitsumata mountain cottage (三俣山荘, Mitsumata-sansō) – in the col between Mount Mitsumatagenge and Mount Washiba (with Campsite)

=== Alpine plant ===
A lot of Alpine plant are seen in the surrounding.

Lilium medeoloides	Veratrum stamineum	Trollius japonicus	Geum pentapetalum	Geranium yesoemse

== Geography ==
=== Nearby mountains ===
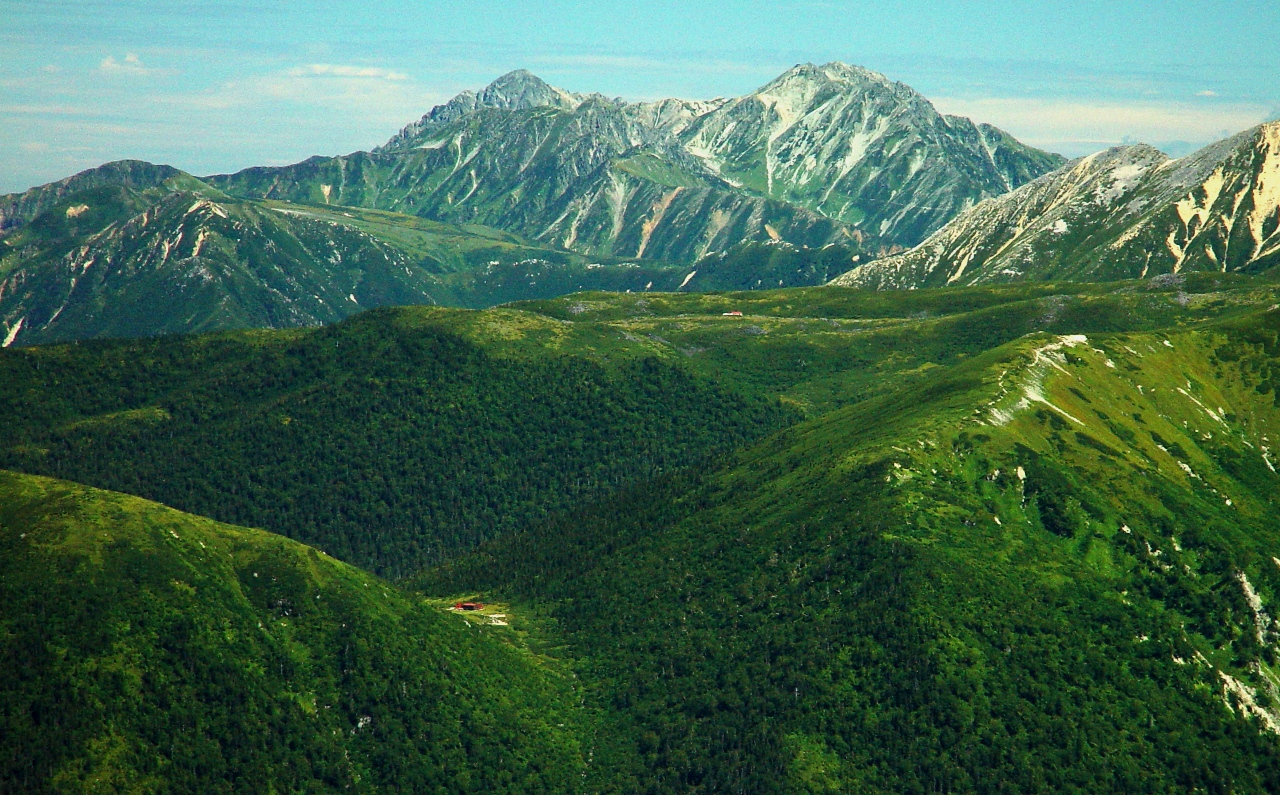
Kurobegorō hut and Hida Mountains, seen from Mount Kasa

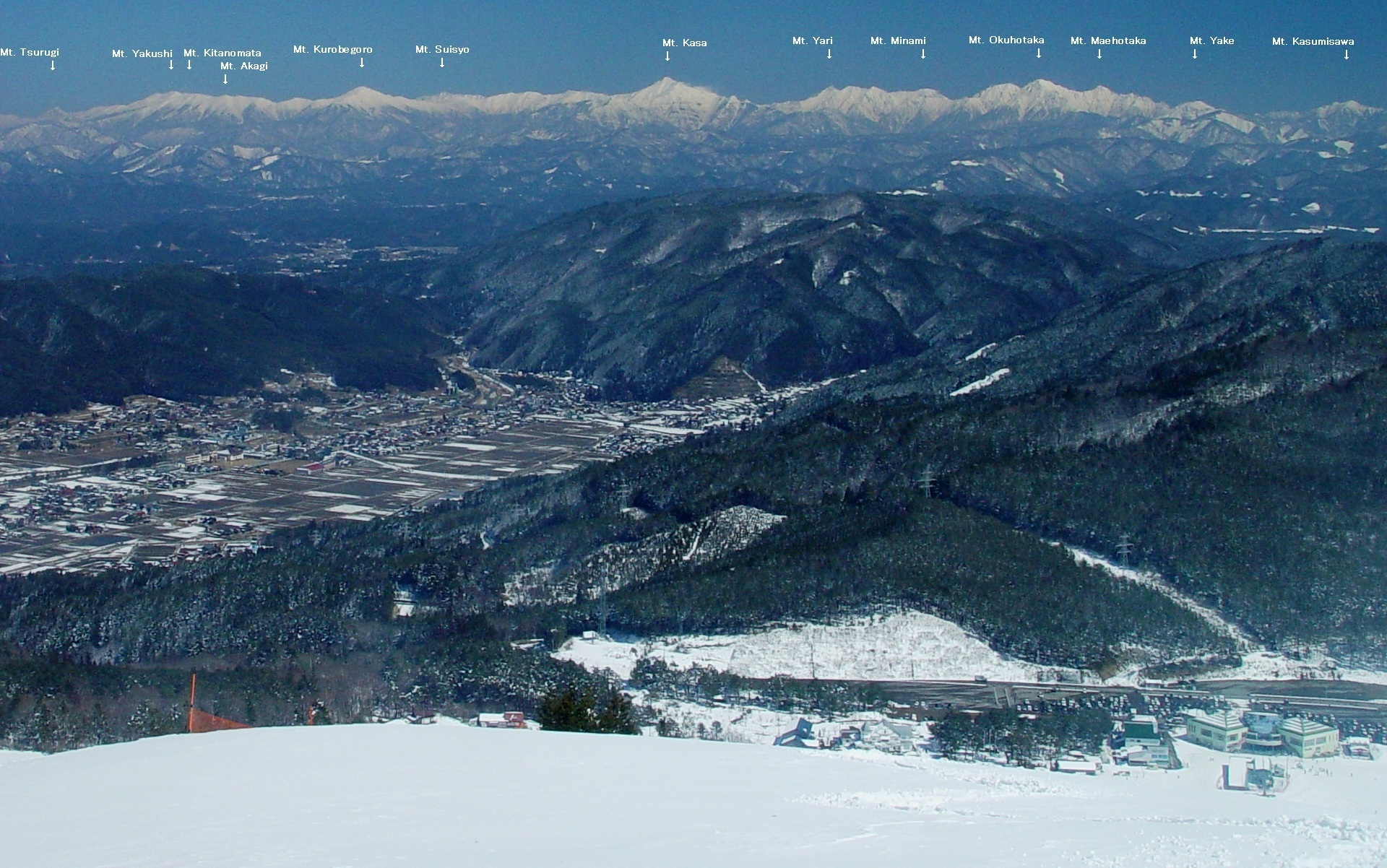
Hida Mountains seen from Mount Kurai

Image	Mountain	Elevation	Distance from the Top	Note
	Mt. Yakushi 薬師岳	2,926.01 m (9,600 ft)	8.5 km (5.3 mi)	100 Famous Japanese Mountains
	Mt. Kitanamata 北ノ俣岳	2,662 m (8,734 ft)	4.0 km (2.5 mi)	
	Mt. Kurobegorō 黒部五郎岳	2,839.58 m (9,316 ft)	0 km (0.0 mi)	100 Famous Japanese Mountains
	Mt. Mitsumatarenge 三俣蓮華岳	2,841.23 m (9,322 ft)	4.3 km (2.7 mi)	300 Famous Japanese Mountains; Boundary of three prefectures Toyama, Gifu and Nagano
	Mt. Kasa 笠ヶ岳	2,897.48 m (9,506 ft)	0 km (0.0 mi)	100 Famous Japanese Mountains
	Mt. Yari 槍ヶ岳	3,180 m (10,433 ft)	11.2 km (7.0 mi)	100 Famous Japanese Mountains

=== Rivers ===
The mountain is the source of the following rivers, each of which flows to the Sea of Japan.

- Nakanomata River (tributary of the Takahara River)
- Kanekido River (tributary of the Jōganji River)
- Uma River and Gorō River (tributaries of the Kurobe River)

== Scenery of Mount Kurobegorō ==
from Mt. Kasa	from Mt. Washiba	from Mt. Yari	from Mt. Yari (sunset)

== See also ==
- Hida Mountains
- Chūbu-Sangaku National Park
- List of mountains in Japan
- 100 Famous Japanese Mountains
