= 100 Famous Japanese Mountains =

1964 book by Kyuya Fukada

- Book cover, English edition
- Author: Kyūya Fukada
- Original title: 日本百名山
- Translator: Martin Hood
- Language: Japanese, translated in English
- Publisher: University of Hawaii Press
- Publication date: 1964
- English publication date: 31 December 2014
- ISBN: 978-0824836771

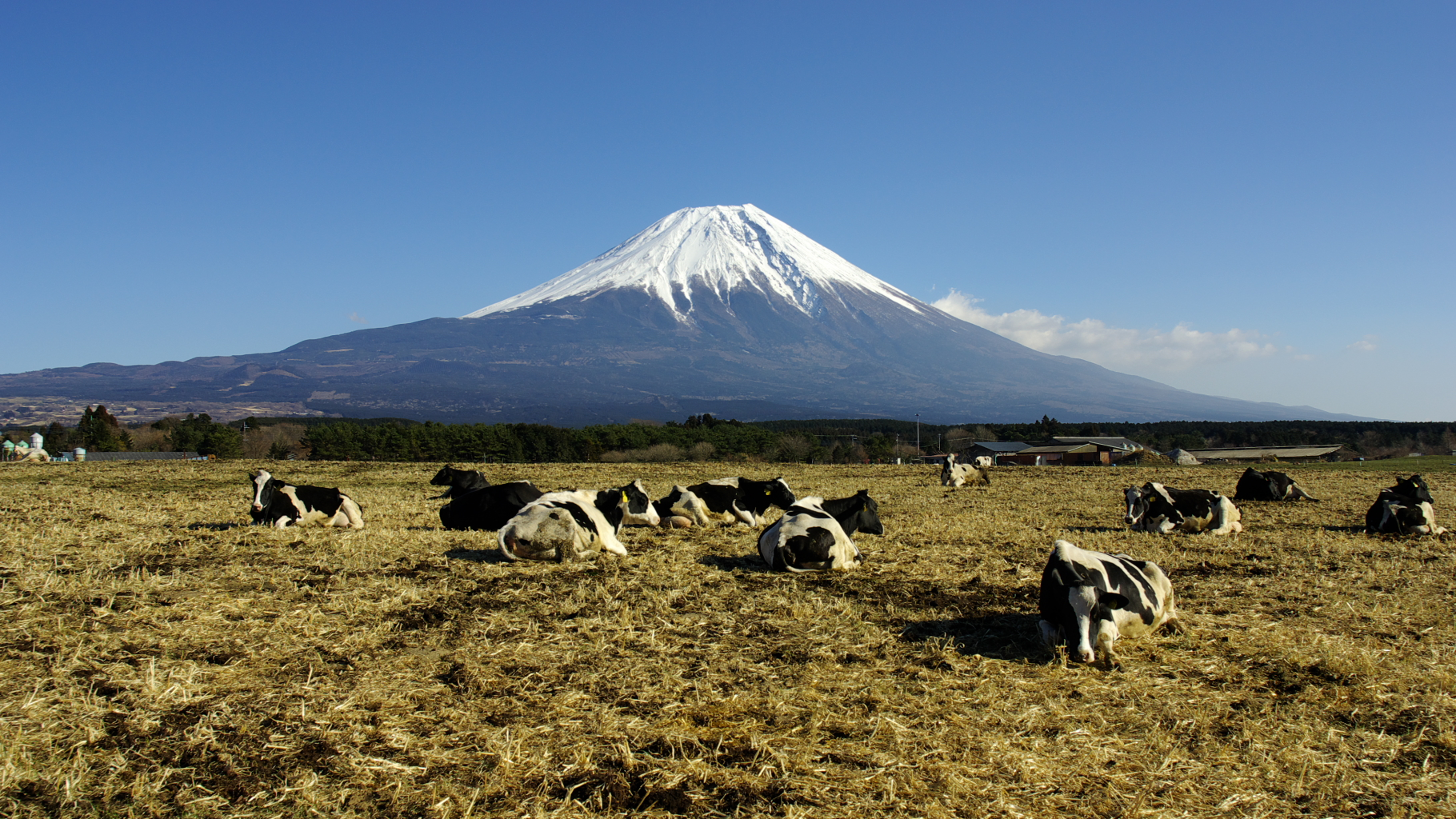
Mount Fuji (3,776 m; 12,388 ft) from Asagiri-kōgen

100 Famous Japanese Mountains (日本百名山, Nihon Hyaku-meizan) is a book written in 1964 by mountaineer and author Kyūya Fukada. The list has been the topic of NHK documentaries, and other hiking books. An English edition, One Hundred Mountains of Japan, translated by Martin Hood, was published in 2014 by the University of Hawaii Press (ISBN 9780824836771).

The complete list (sorted into regions from northeast to southwest) is below.

== History ==
Selections of celebrated mountains have been produced since the Edo period. Tani Bunchō praised 90 mountains in 日本名山図会 (A collection of maps and pictures of famous Japanese mountains), but among these were included such small mountains as Mount Asama in Ise, Mie, and Mount Nokogiri on the Bōsō Peninsula. Unsatisfied with this selection, Fukuda, who had climbed many mountains in Japan, selected 100 celebrated Japanese mountains based on a combination of grace, history, and individuality.

Though it was at first unknown other than to some hiking enthusiasts and avid readers, reports that the list was one of the (then) Crown Prince's favorite books increased its profile. The Emperor is a mountain enthusiast to the extent that he has even belonged to an alpine club, and it has been reported that it is a dream of his to reach the summit of every mountain on the list.

Since the 1980s, there has been a climbing boom amongst the middle-aged. It is not alpinism for experts, sometimes including rock climbing, that has been popularised, but rather more casual hiking or trekking for ordinary people. However, due to the creation of more mountain lodges and trails, and the improvement of mountaineering technology, it became possible to climb mountains which had previously been considered very rugged.

The list became widely read, and more and more people have chosen mountains from the book to climb. In imitation of the Emperor, many people have also set the goal of reaching every summit on the list.

Mountaineering programs on NHK helped popularize the list. The station televised a documentary about taking up the mountains on the list one by one, and Rambō Minami's mountaineering primer for the middle-aged. These gained broad popularity, and the list became widely known. Since then, lists of 200 and 300 mountains, lists of hundreds of mountains in various localities, and a list of 100 floral mountains have appeared.

In 2002, a new record was established when all the mountains were traversed in 66 days. This was superseded in 2007, with a new record of 48 continuous days. This was reduced to 33 days in 2014

== Assessment ==
Compared to other modern essays on Japanese mountains such as Mountaineering and Exploration in the Japanese Alps by Walter Weston, the book is short. Fukuda writes about the history of the mountains, especially the origins of their names. It is not a text that people can read to vicariously experience climbing or nature. Some think that the reason the list has been widely well received is that it put into focus 100 mountains which were already well known.

== Selection criteria ==
Fukada selected 100 mountains from those he had climbed according to three criteria: grace, history and individuality. There was some flexibility regarding the height, with some of the mountains, like Mount Tsukuba and Mount Kaimon, being under the limit.

There have been many varying opinions about the criteria for selection. It is often pointed out that the list emphasizes mountains in the Chūbu region. It has been reported that Fukada, who was from Ishikawa Prefecture, was brought up looking at Mt. Haku, but he only selected 13 further west.

However, grace and individuality are in the eye of the beholder, and throughout history, many legends have been circulated about mountains throughout the Kinki region. Moreover, many mountain-lovers have argued that since Mount Tsukuba, with an altitude of 877 meters (876 at the time), was selected, certain mountains in other localities should have been chosen.

== List by region ==
=== Hokkaidō ===
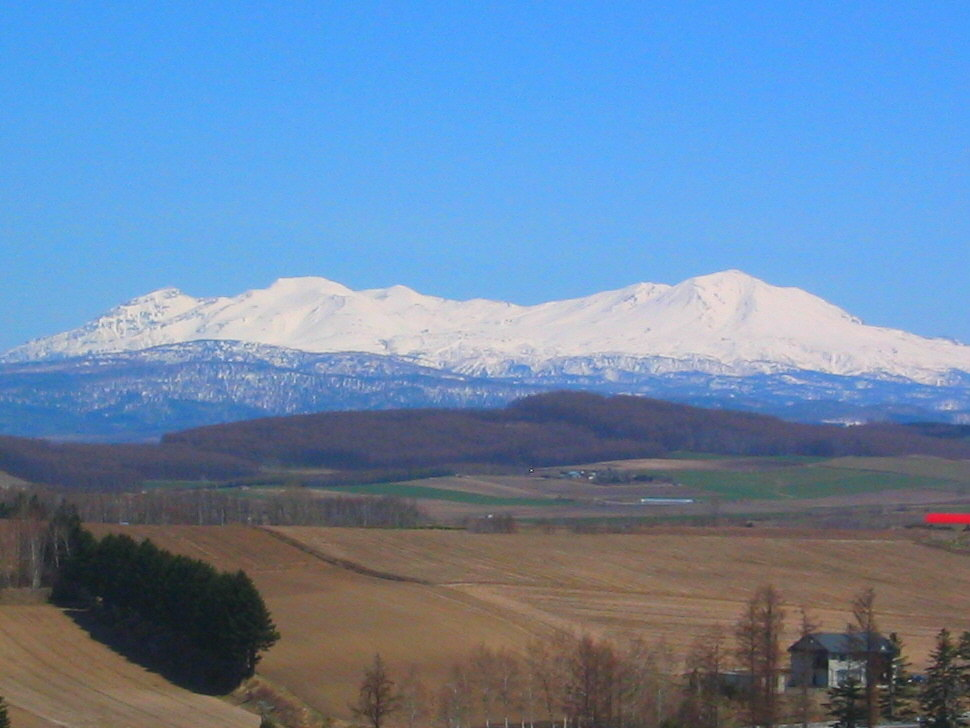
Mount Daisetsu - 2,191m

- Akan Volcanic Complex (阿寒岳)
- Daisetsuzan Volcanic Group (大雪山)
- Mount Poroshiri (幌尻岳)
- Mount Rausu (羅臼岳)
- Mount Rishiri (利尻岳)
- Mount Shari (斜里岳)
- Mount Tokachi (十勝岳)
- Mount Tomuraushi (トムラウシ山)
- Mount Yōtei (羊蹄山)

=== Tōhoku region ===
- Mount Adatara (安達太良山)
- Mount Aizu-Komagatake (会津駒ヶ岳)
- Mount Asahi (朝日岳)

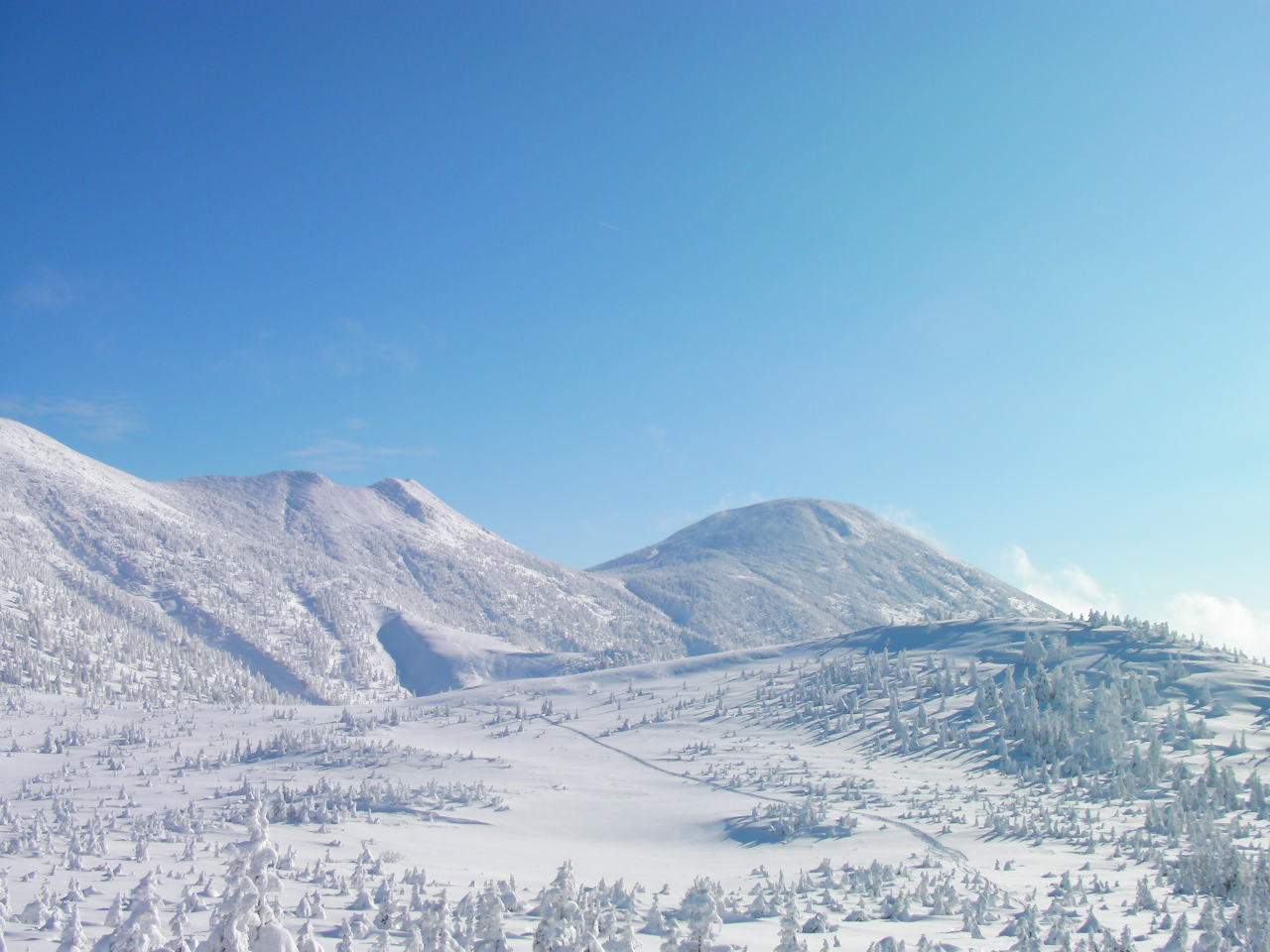
Hakkōda - 1,584m

- Mount Azuma (吾妻山)
- Mount Bandai (磐梯山)
- Mount Chōkai (鳥海山)
- Mount Gassan (月山)
- Mount Hachimantai (八幡平)
- Hakkōda (八甲田山)
- Mount Hayachine (早池峰山)
- Mount Hiuchigatake (燧ヶ岳)
- Mount Iide (飯豊山)
- Mount Iwaki (岩木山)
- Mount Iwate (岩手山)
- Mount Zaō (蔵王山)

=== Kantō region ===
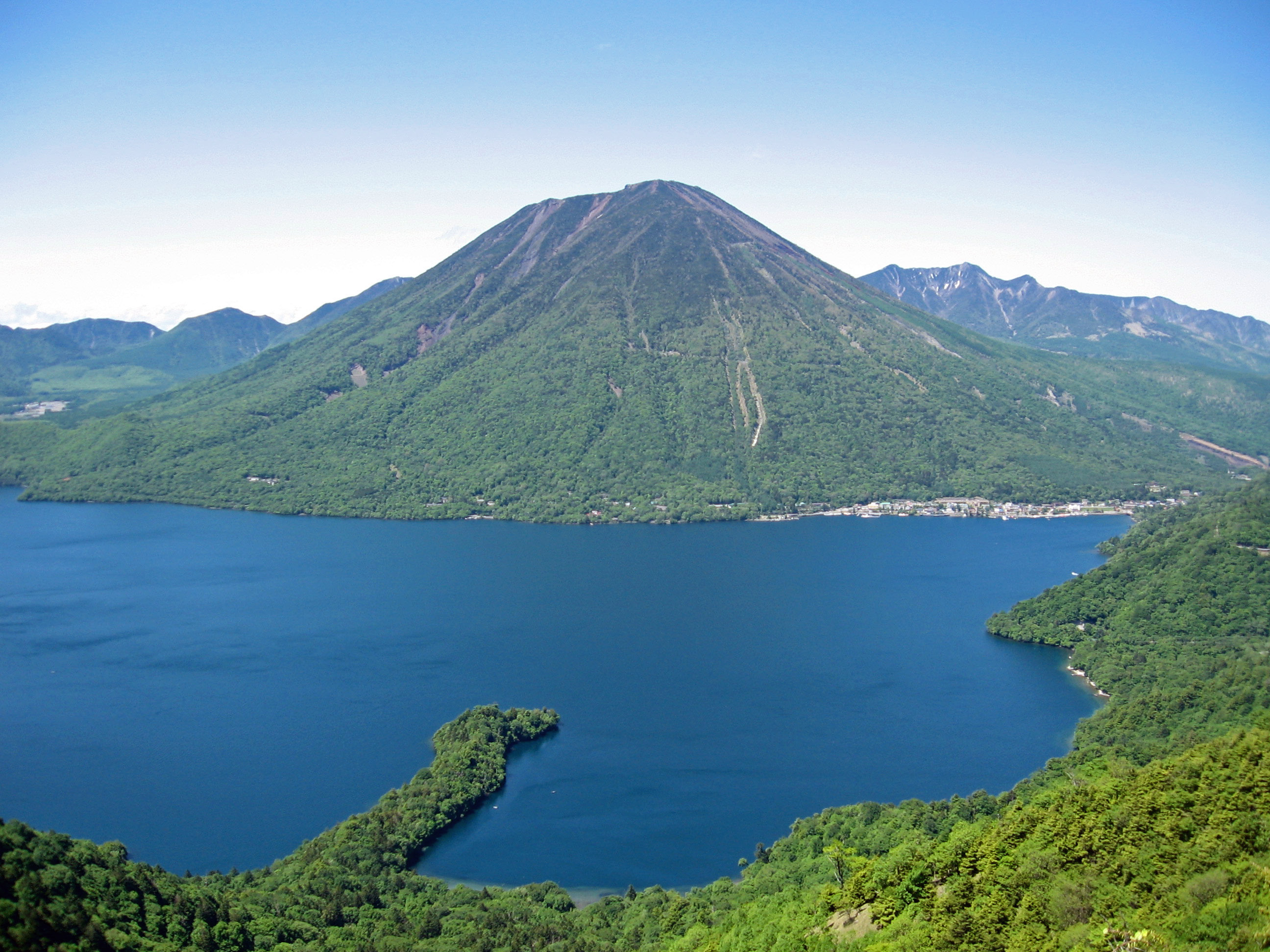
Mount Nantai - 2,486m

- Mount Akagi (赤城山)
- Mount Asama (浅間山)
- Mount Azumaya (四阿山)
- Mount Hiragatake (平ヶ岳)
- Mount Hotaka (武尊山)
- Mount Kumotori (雲取山)
- Mount Kusatsu-Shirane (草津白根山)
- Mount Nantai (男体山)
- Mount Nasu (那須岳)
- Mount Nikkō-Shirane (日光白根山)
- Mount Ryōkami (両神山)
- Mount Shibutsu (至仏山)
- Mount Sukai (皇海山)
- Mount Tanigawa (谷川岳)
- Mount Tanzawa (丹沢山)
- Mount Tsukuba (筑波山)

=== Chūbu region ===
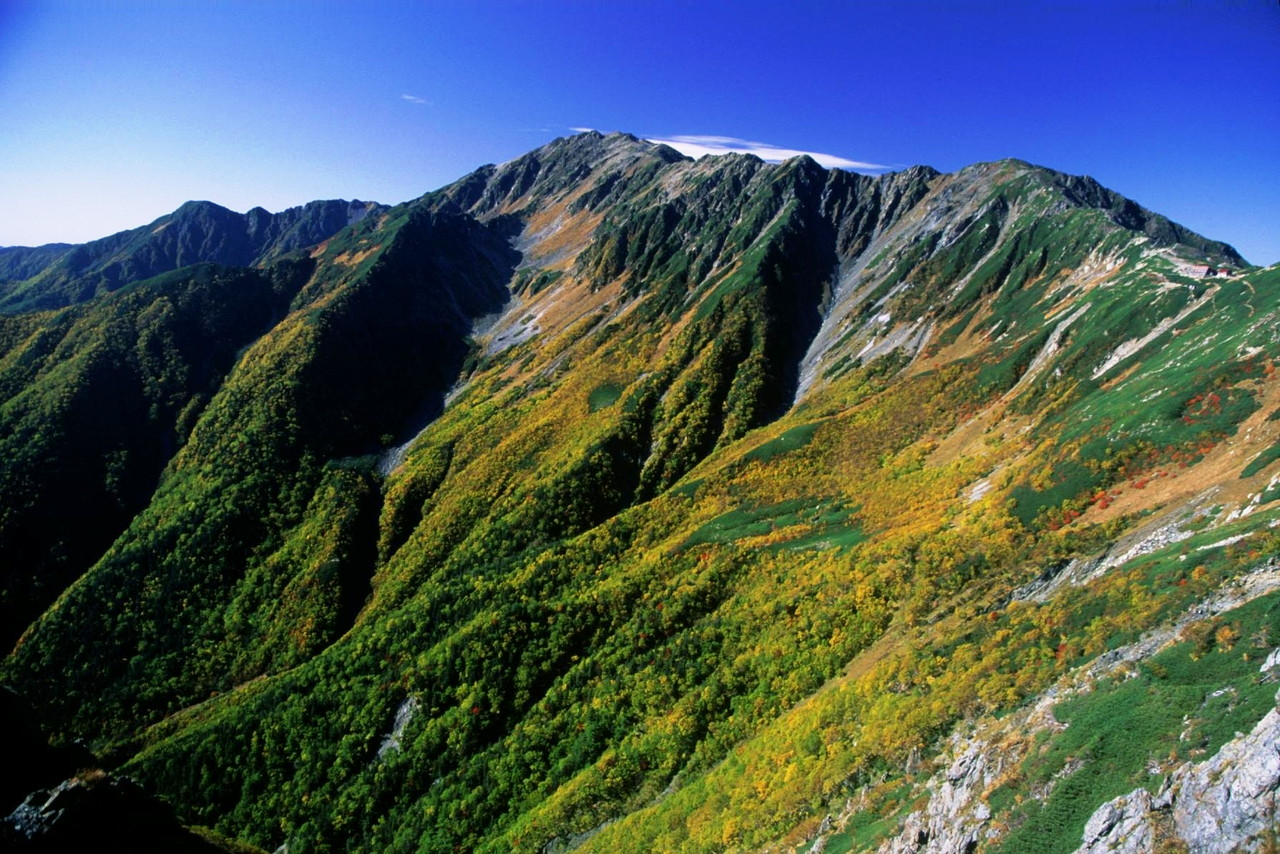
Mount Aino - 3,189m

- Mount Aino (間ノ岳)
- Mount Akaishi (赤石岳)
- Mount Amagi (天城山)
- Mount Amakazari (雨飾山)
- Mount Daibosatsu (大菩薩岳)
- Mount Ena (恵那山)
- Mount Fuji (富士山)
- Mount Goryu (五竜岳)
- Mount Haku (白山)
- Mount Hijiri (聖岳)
- Mount Hiuchi (火打山)
- Mount Hōō (鳳凰山)

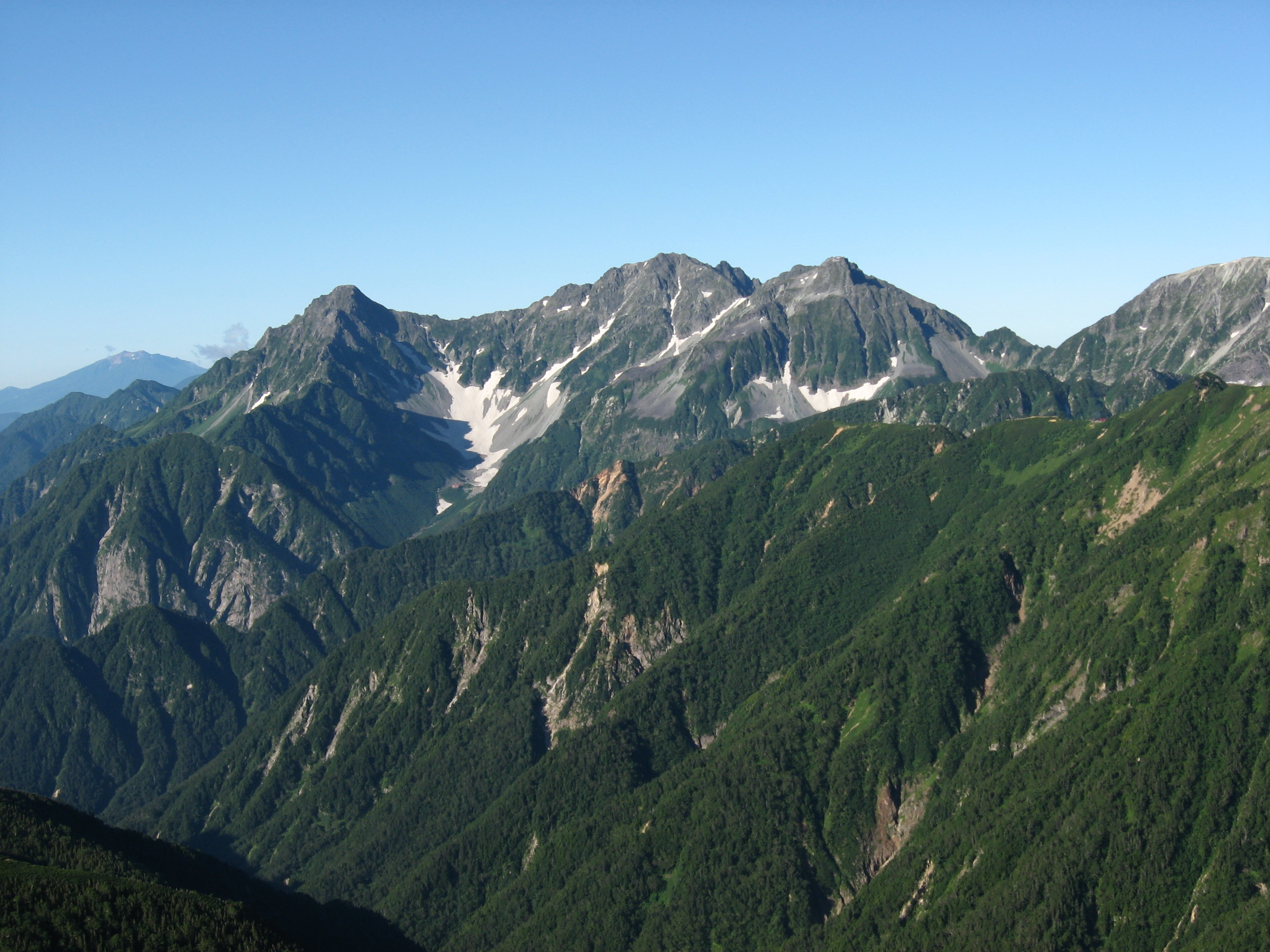
Mount Hotaka - 3,190m

- Mount Hotaka (穂高岳)
- Mount Jōnen (常念岳)
- Mount Kaikoma (甲斐駒ヶ岳)
- Mount Kasa (笠ヶ岳)
- Mount Kashimayari (鹿島槍ヶ岳)
- Mount Kinpu (金峰山)
- Mount Kirigamine (霧ヶ峰)
- Mount Kisokoma (木曾駒ヶ岳)
- Mount Kita (北岳)
- Mount Kobushi (甲武信ヶ岳)
- Mount Kurobegorō (黒部五郎岳)
- Mount Makihata (巻機山)
- Mount Mizugaki (瑞牆山)
- Mount Myōkō (妙高山)
- Mount Naeba (苗場山)
- Mount Norikura (乗鞍岳)
- Mount Ontake (御嶽山)
- Mount Senjō (仙丈ヶ岳)
- Mount Shiomi (塩見岳)

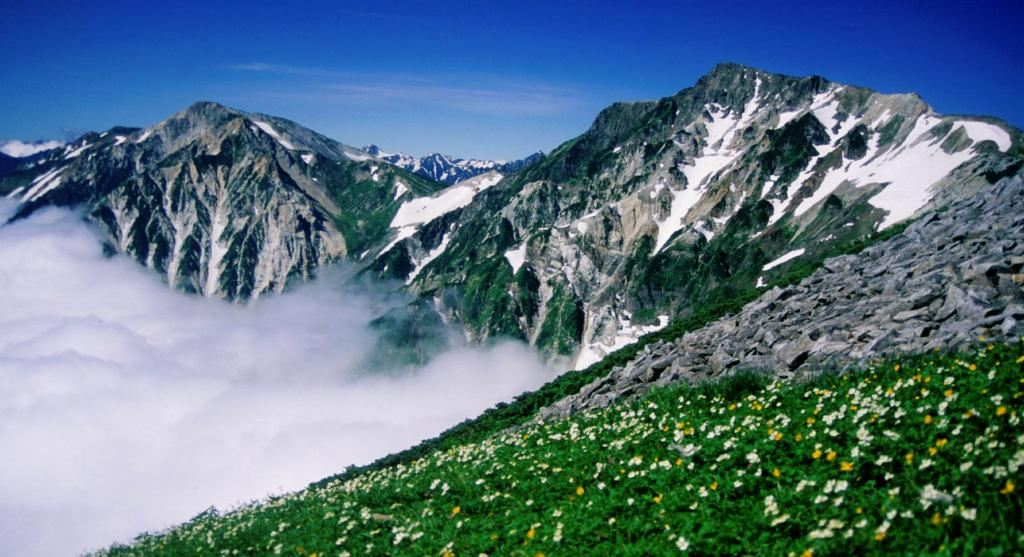
Mount Shirouma - 2,932m

- Mount Shirouma (白馬岳)
- Mount Suisho (水晶岳), also known as Mount Kuro (黒岳)
- Mount Takatsuma (高妻山)
- Mount Tateshina (蓼科山)
- Mount Tate (立山)
- Mount Tekari (光岳)
- Mount Tsurugi (剱岳)
- Mount Uonuma-Komagatake (魚沼駒ヶ岳)
- Mount Utsugi (空木岳)
- Mount Warusawa (悪沢岳), also known as Mount Arakawa (荒川岳)
- Mount Washiba (鷲羽岳)
- Mount Yake (焼岳)
- Mount Yakushi (薬師岳)
- Mount Yari (槍ヶ岳)
- Yatsugatake (八ヶ岳)
- Utsukushigahara Highland (美ヶ原)

=== Western Japan ===
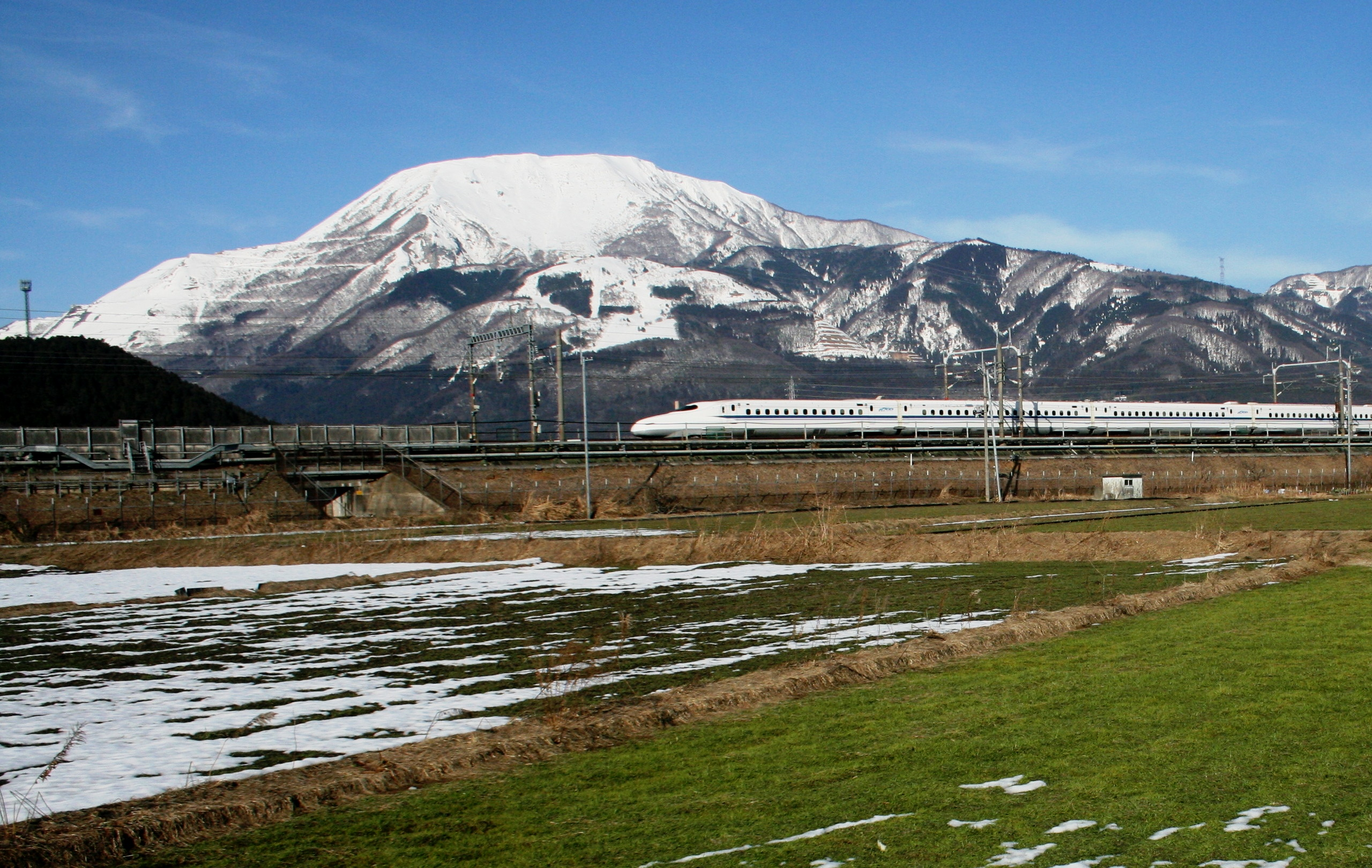
Mount Ibuki and N700 Series Shinkansen - 1,377m

- Mount Arashima (荒島岳)
- Mount Aso (阿蘇山)
- Daisen (大山)
- Mount Ibuki (伊吹山)
- Mount Ishizuchi (石鎚山)
- Mount Kaimon (開聞岳)
- Mount Kirishima (霧島山)
- Mount Kujū (九重山) or Kokonoe
- Mount Miyanoura (宮之浦岳)
- Mount Ōdaigahara (大台ヶ原山)
- Mount Ōmine (大峰山)
- Mount Sobo (祖母山)
- Mount Tsurugi (剣山)

== See also ==
- Kyūya Fukada
- List of mountains in Japan
