= Mount Hiragatake =

Mountain in Gunma and Niigata Prefecture, Japan

Mount Hira-ga-take
- 平ヶ岳
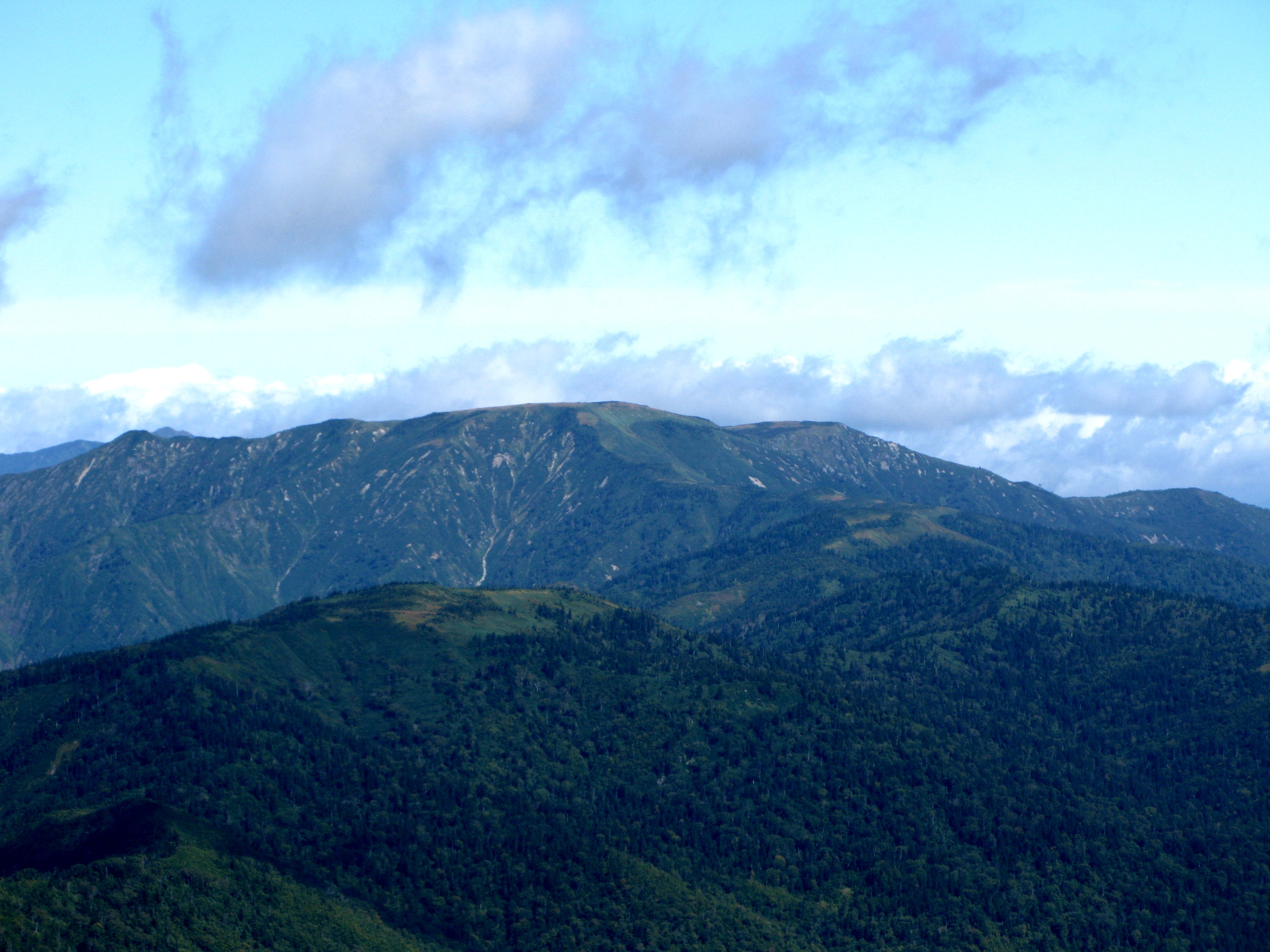

Highest point
- Elevation: 2,141 m (7,024 ft)
- Listing: List of the 100 famous mountains in Japan
- Coordinates: 37°00′07″N 139°10′15″E

Geography
- Location within Japan
- Location: Gunma Prefecture, Niigata Prefecture, Japan

Climbing
- Easiest route: Hike

Mount Hiragatake (平ヶ岳, Hira-ga-take) is one of the 100 Famous Japanese Mountains. It lies on the border between Gunma and Niigata prefectures.
