= Mount Suisho =

Mountain in Japan

- Mount Kuro, 水晶岳
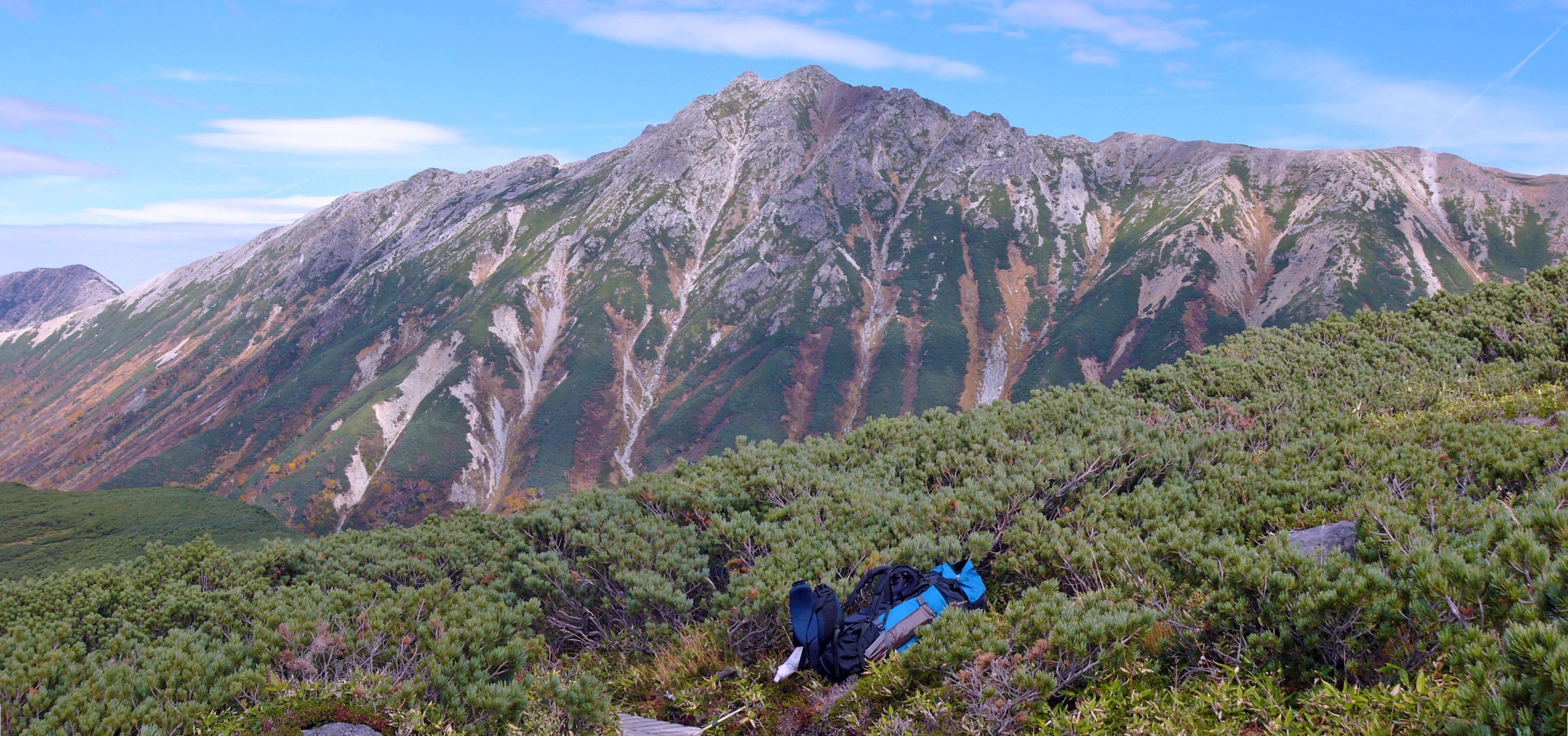

Highest point
- Elevation: 2,986 m (9,797 ft)
- Listing: List of mountains in Japan; 100 Famous Japanese Mountains
- Coordinates: 36°25′35″N 137°36′10″E

Naming
- English translation: Crystle Mountain
- Language of name: Japanese

Geography
- Location within Japan
- Location: Toyama Prefecture, Japan
- Parent range: Hida Mountains

Mount Suisho (水晶岳, Suishō-dake; lit. "Mount Crystal"), also known as Kurodake or Mount Kuro (黒岳, Kuro-dake; lit. "Black Mountain"), is a mountain in the southeastern area of Toyama Prefecture, Japan. It is designated as one of the 100 Famous Japanese Mountains.

== Overview ==
Mount Suisho is the highest mountain in the Toyama and Kurobe River area. It is the 23rd highest mountain in Japan.

== Etymology ==
It is named "Mount Suisho" (crystal mountain) after the large crystals that have come from the mountain. As the mountain looks black, it is also named "Mount Kuro" or "Black Mountain".

== Gallery ==
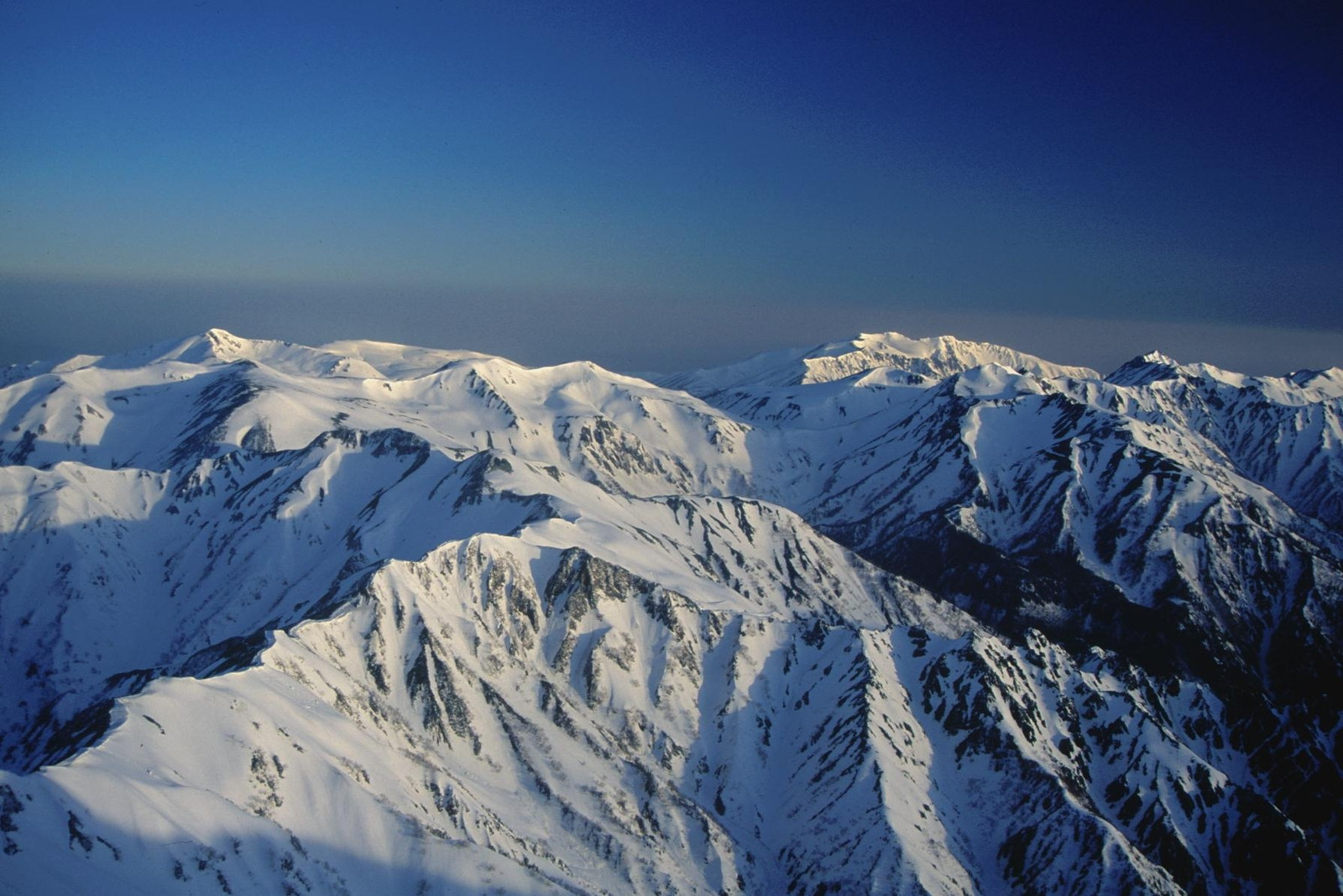
Mount Suisho seen from Mount Yari.

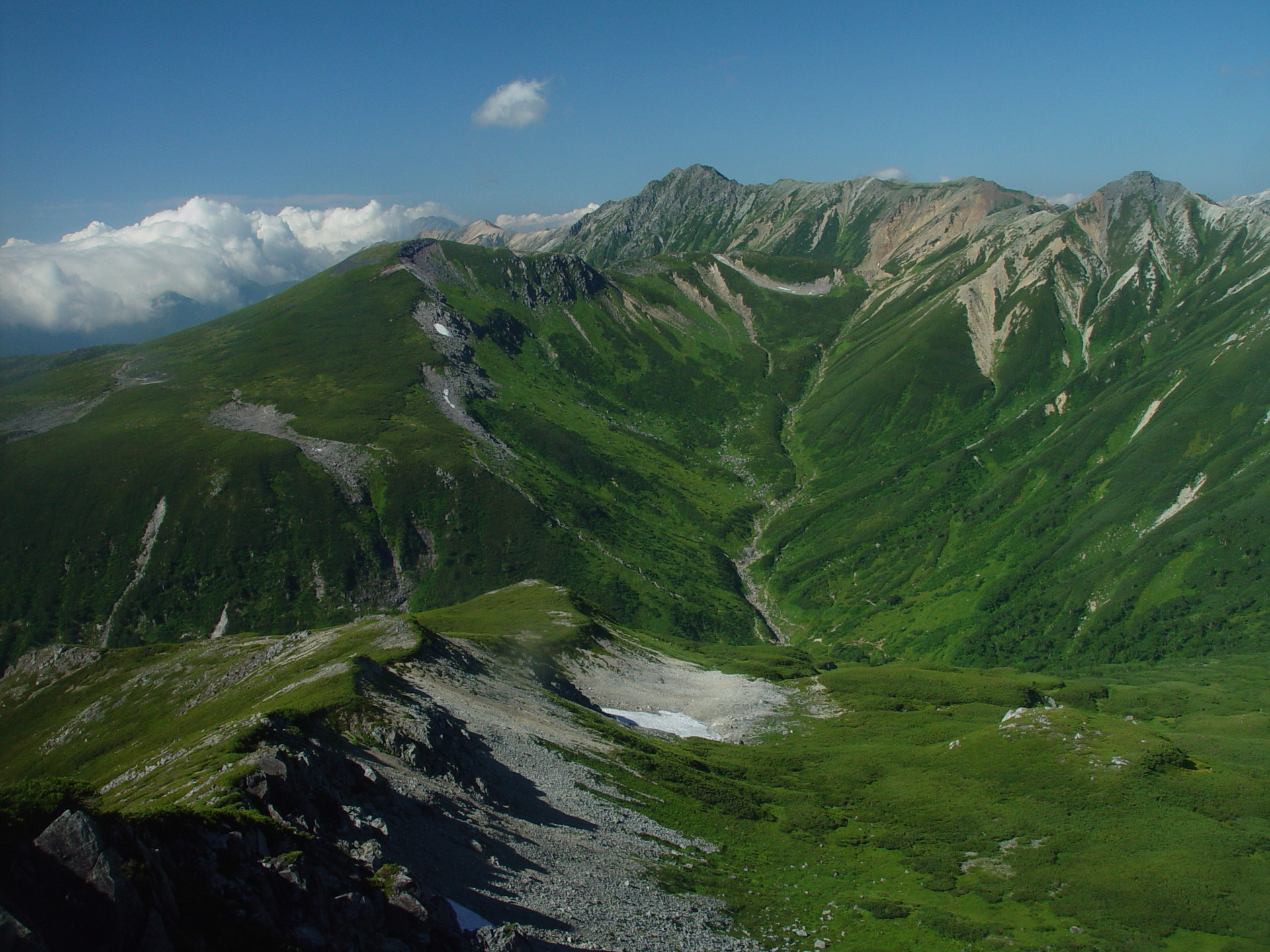
Mount Suisho seen from Mount Mitsumatarenge

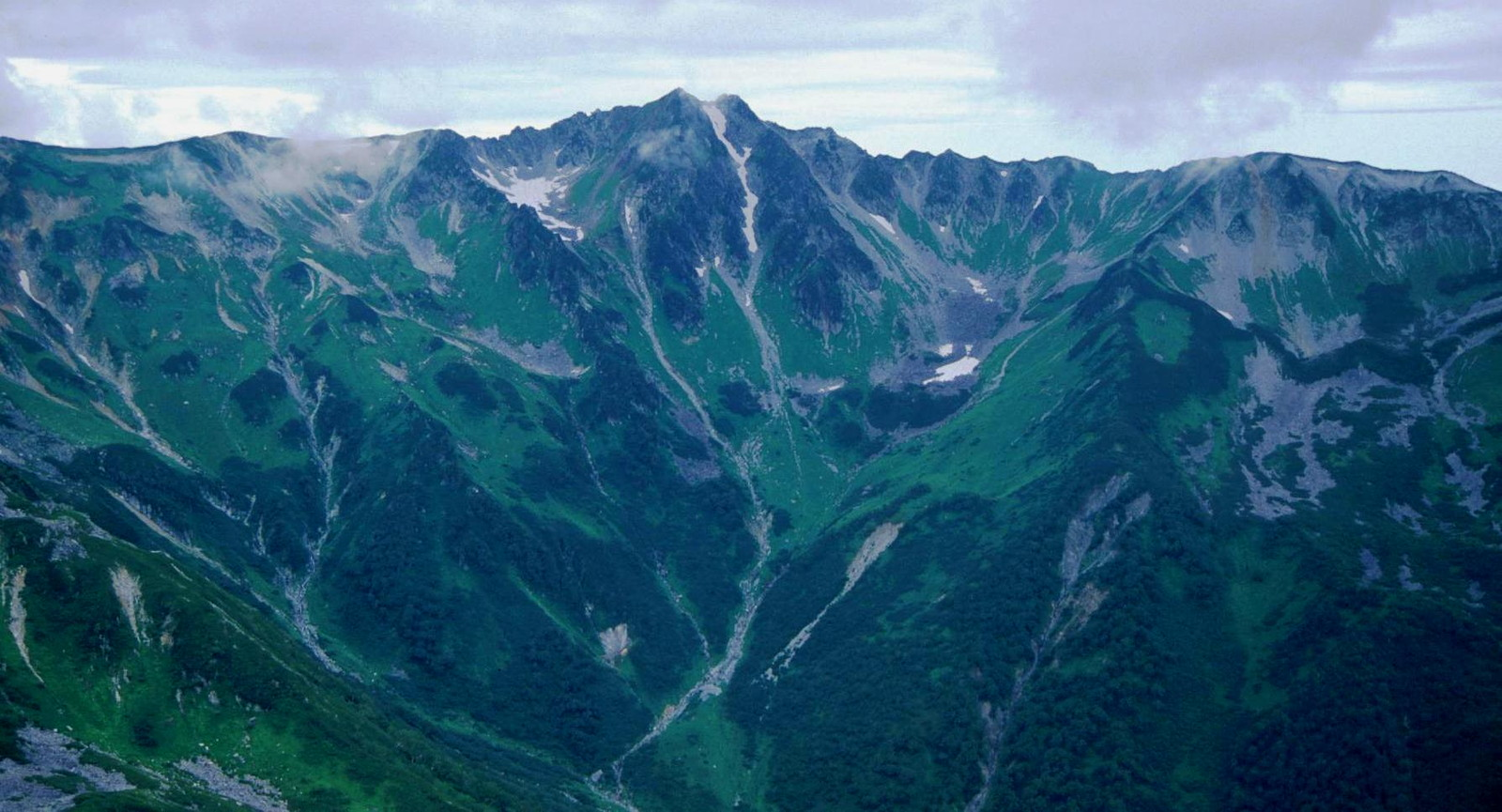
Mount Suisho 's cirque seen from Mount Nogutigoro.

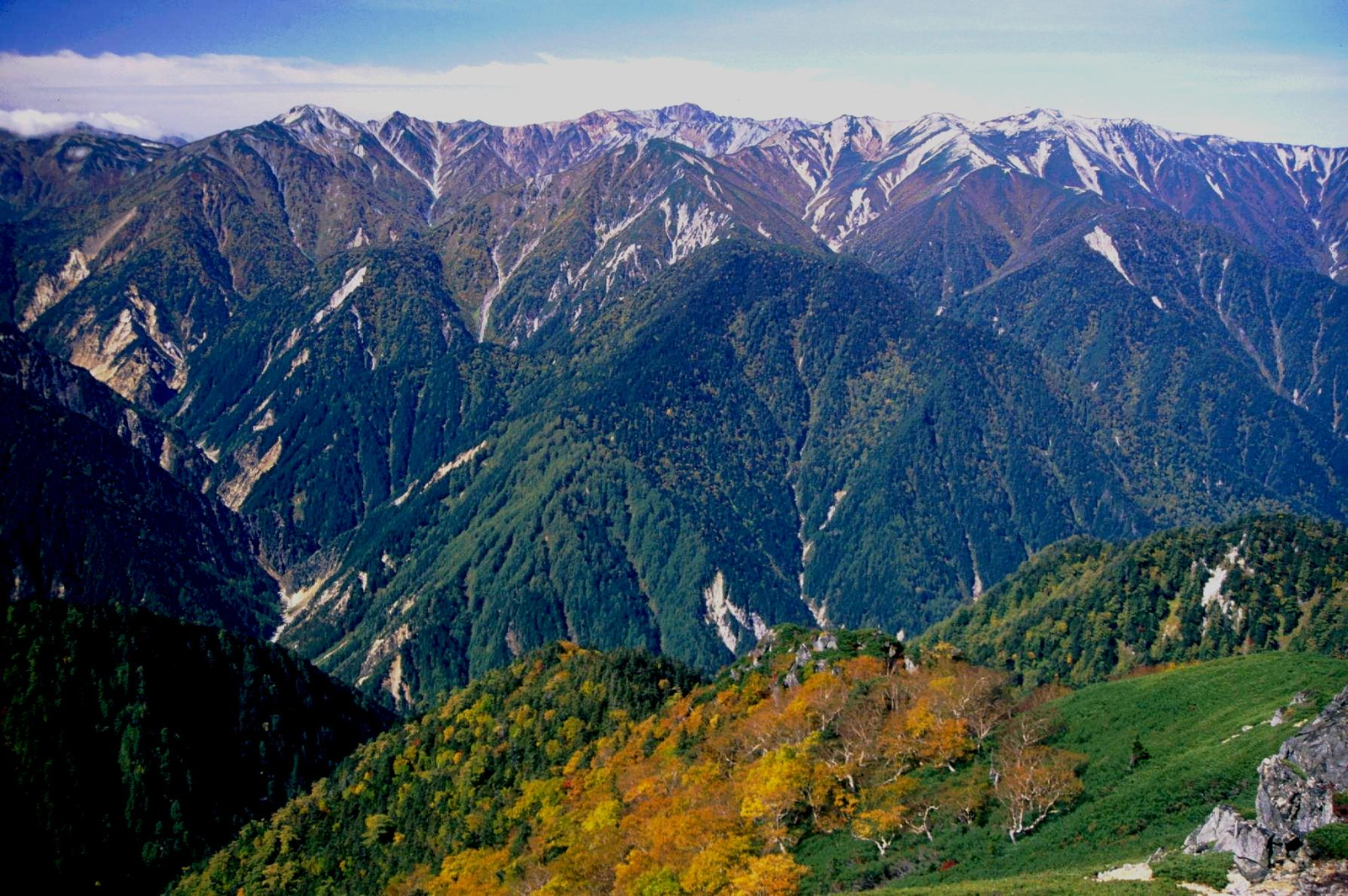
Mount Suisho seen from Mount Tsubakuro

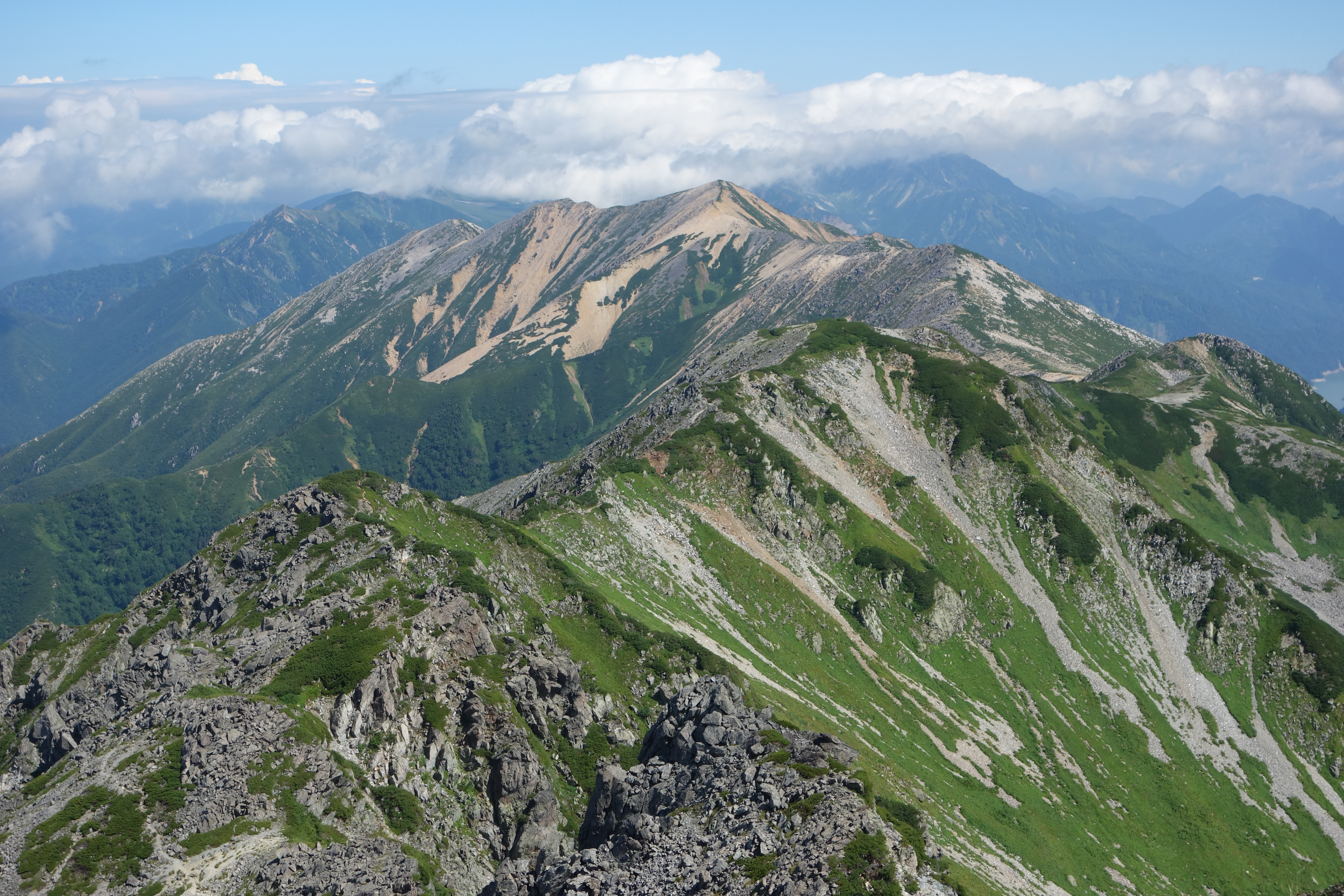
Mount Akaushi seen from Mount Suisho.

== See also ==
- Chūbu-Sangaku National Park
