= Mount Makihata =

Mountain in Japan

- 巻機山
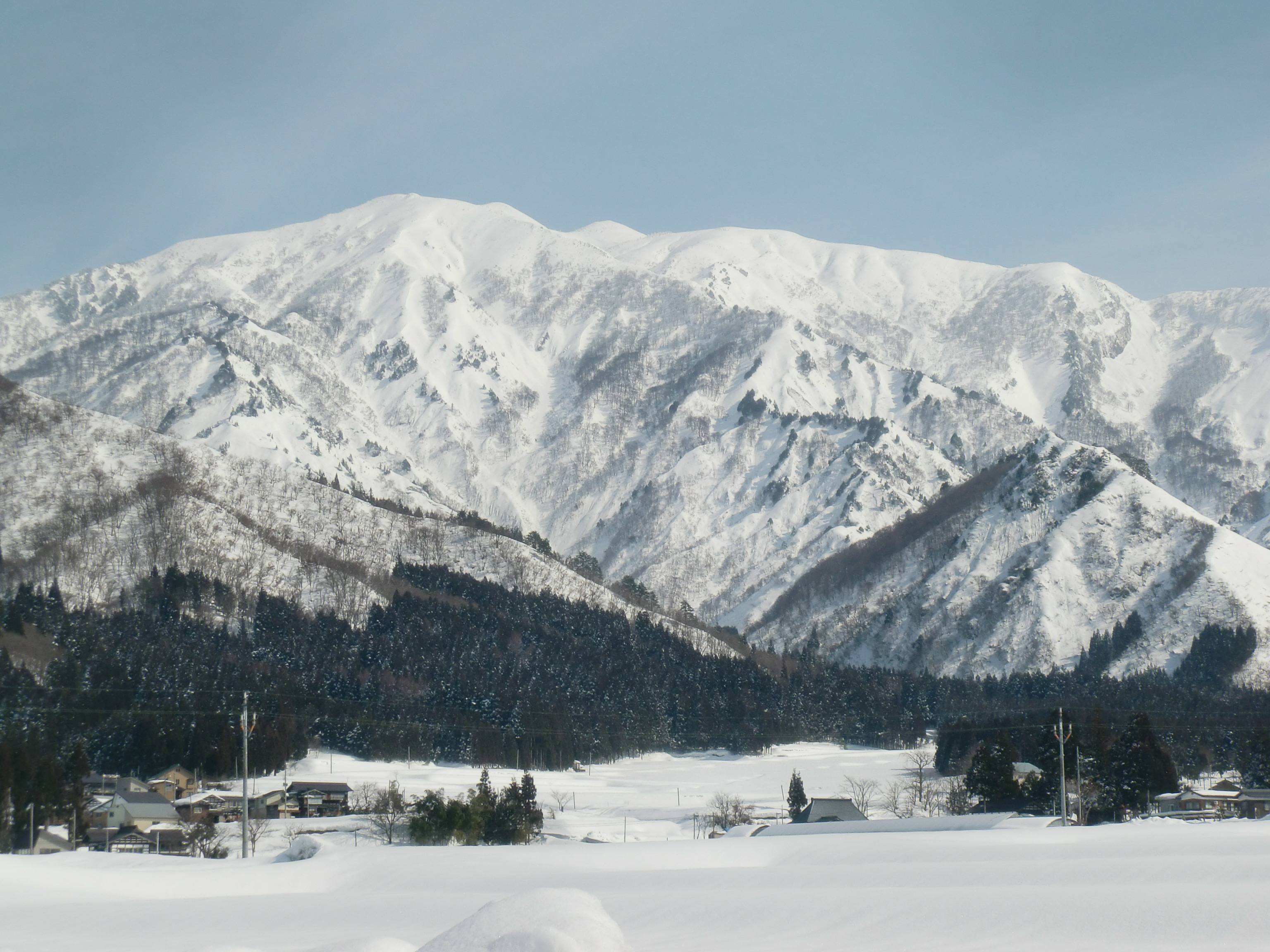
- The western face of Mount Makihata

Highest point
- Elevation: 1,967 m (6,453 ft)
- Listing: List of mountains and hills of Japan by height 100 Famous Japanese Mountains
- Coordinates: 36°58′43″N 138°57′51″E

Geography
- Location within Japan
- Location: Niigata and Gunma prefectures, Japan
- Parent range: Mikuni Mountains

Mount Makihata (巻機山, Makihata-yama) is a mountain on the border between Niigata Prefecture and Gunma Prefecture in Japan. The mountain is listed as one of the 100 Famous Japanese Mountains in a 1964 book by mountaineer/author Kyūya Fukada. It has a peak elevation of 1,967 meters (6,453 ft).
