= Mount Yakushi =

Mountain in the country of Japan

- 薬師岳
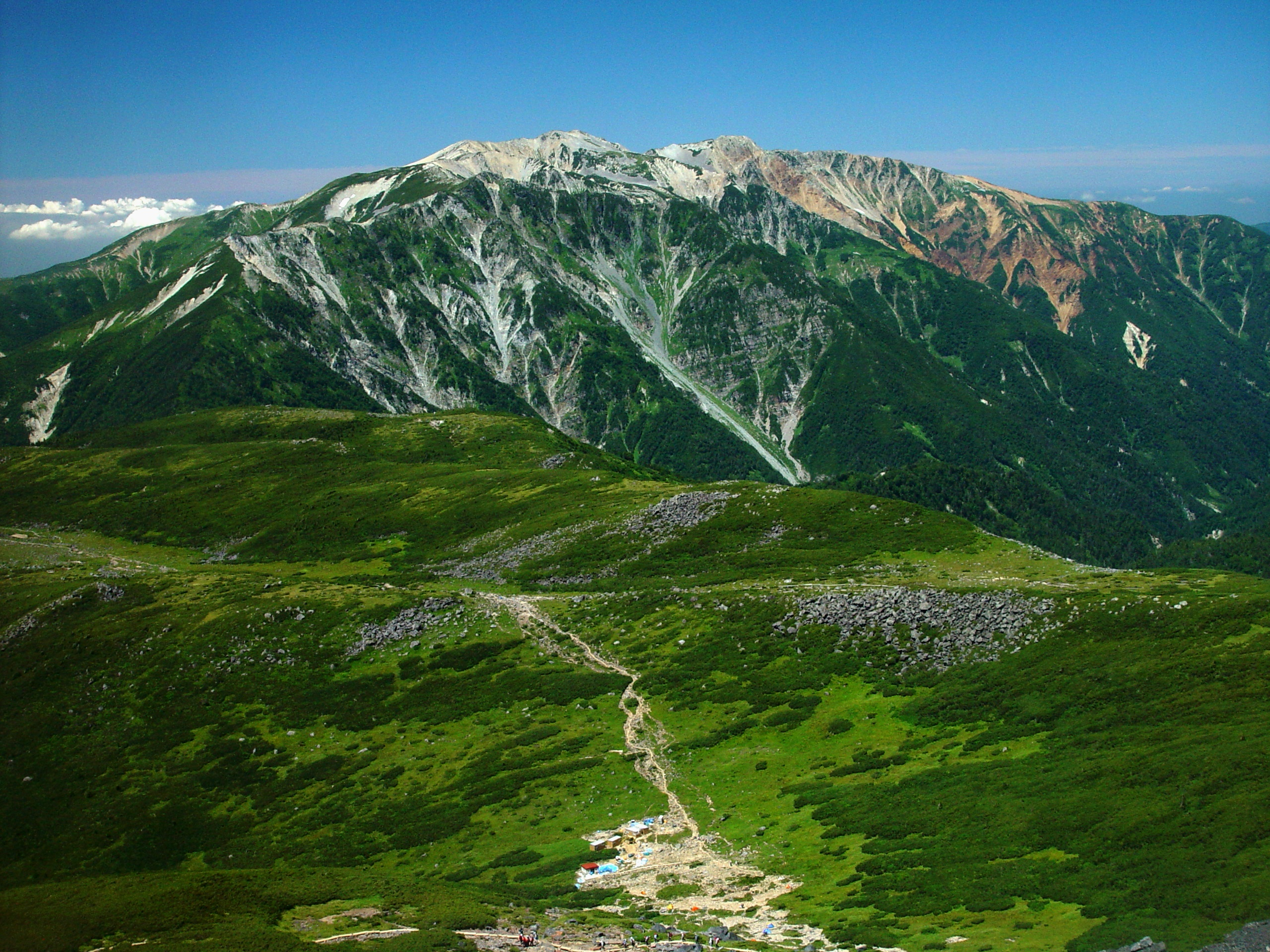
- Mount Yakushi seen from Mount Suishō

Highest point
- Elevation: 2,926.01 m (9,599.8 ft)
- Listing: List of mountains in Japan; 100 Famous Japanese Mountains
- Coordinates: 36°28′08″N 137°32′41″E

Naming
- Language of name: Japanese
- Pronunciation: [jakɯ̥ɕidake]

Geography
- Location within Japan
- Location: Toyama, Toyama Prefecture, Japan
- Parent range: Hida Mountains
- Topo map(s): Geospatial Information Authority 25000:1 薬師岳; 50000:1 槍ヶ岳

Climbing
- Easiest route: Hike

Mount Yakushi (薬師岳, Yakushi-dake) is one of the 100 Famous Japanese Mountains, reaching the height of 2,926 m (9,600 ft). It is situated in Japan's Hida Mountains in Toyama Prefecture. It was specified for Chūbu-Sangaku National Park on December 4, 1934.

== Outline ==
There are a lot of mountains with the same name in Japan, but this is the highest peak. It is a mountain of the Faith for a long time as well as Mount Tate and Mount Ontake. Bhaisajyaguru is enshrined in the Shinto shrine on the top of the mountain.

== History ==
- It was the mountain of no admittance for women before the Meiji period.
- 1885 – Benjamin Smith Lyman climbed this mountain and Mount Yari by the purpose of the measurement investigation etc.
- 1904 – Geologist's Naomasa Yamasaki discovered Cirque on the east side of the mountain.
- 1909 – English literature's Jūji Tanabe climbed, and published the book on travel of mountain.
- 1926 – Writer Kyūya Fukada climbed, and published 100 Famous Japanese Mountains in 1964.
- December 4, 1934 – This area was specified to the Chūbu-Sangaku National Park.
- March 29, 1952 – The cirque of Mount Yakushi was specified for the special Natural monument.
- January 15, 1963 – 13 members of Aichi University met an accident in this mountain where a large amount of snows piled, and died.

== Cirque on Mount Yakushi ==
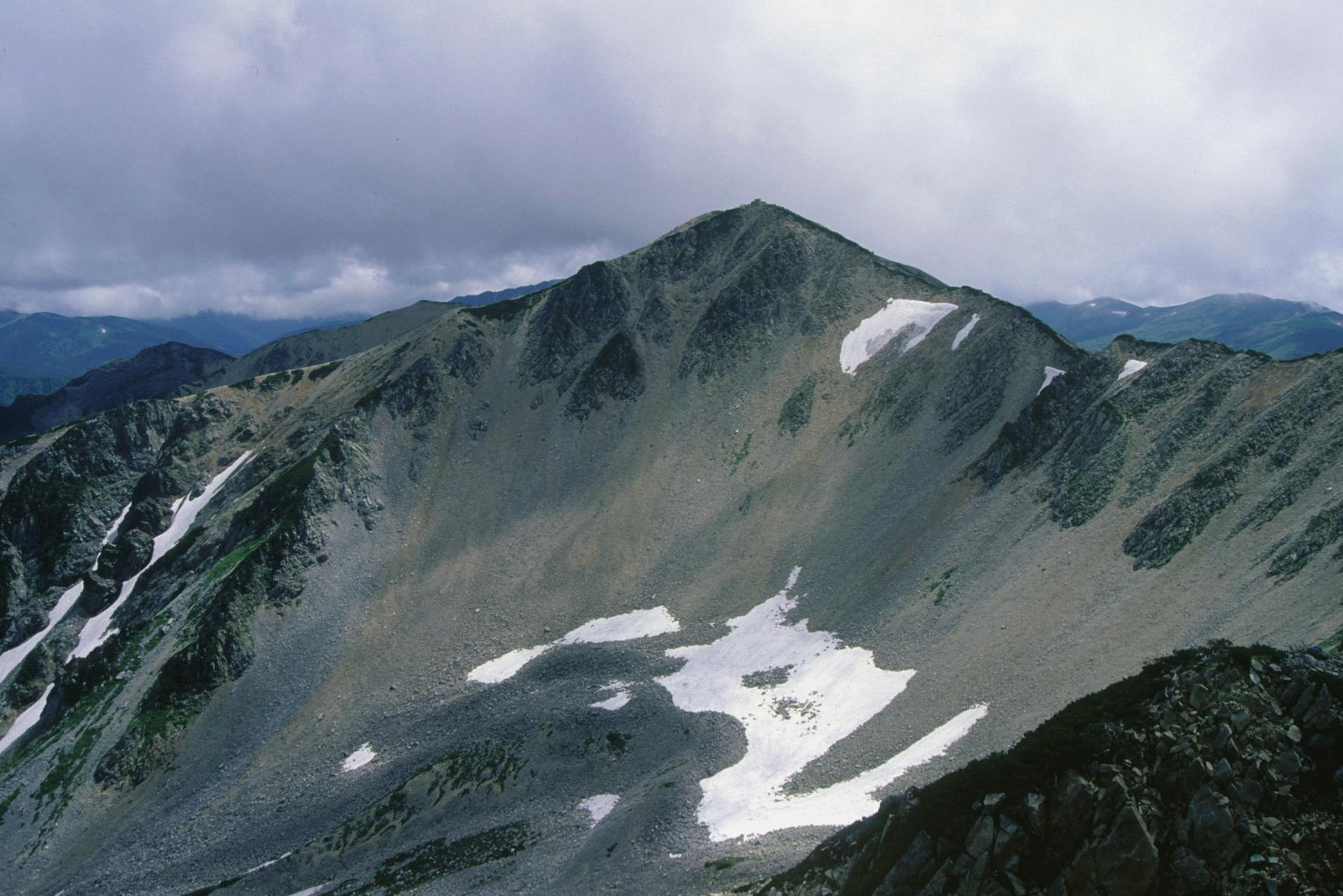
Kanasaku valley cirque and Mount Yakushi seen from North Yakushi

There are 4 large Cirque on the east side of the mountain.

- Northern cirque – It is not plain because it collapsed.
- Kanasaku valley cirque – This was originated by person's name of Kanasaku Miyamoto. It is between Mount kita-Yakushi and Mount Yakushi.
- Central cirque – It is on the southeast side of Mount Yakushi.
- Southern cirque – It is on the southeast of Central cirque.

== Mountaineering ==
=== Main ascent routes ===
There are several climbing routes to the top of the mountain.

- Entrance Arimine (Oritate) : Oritate – Tarōdaira hut – Yakushi mountain pass – Yakushi plain (Yakushi-daira) – Yakushi mountain cottage – Mount Yakushi. This is the shortest route.
- Hietsu-shin-dō (Hietsu new route) : Hietsu Tunnel – Sennin mountain pass – Kagami pond – Mount Teraji – Kitanomata hut – Tarōdaira hut – Yakushi mountain pass – Yakushi plain – Yakushi mountain cottage – Mount Yakushi. Also there is Kamioka-shin-dō (Kamioka new route) for Mount Teraji.
- From Mount Tate : Murodō – Mount Tate – Ichinokosi mountain cottage – Mount Shishi – Zara mountain pass – Goshikigahara – Mount Ecchuzawa – Sugonokkoshi hut – Hazama Mountain – Mount Kita-Yakushi – Mount Yakushi.
- From Mount Kurobegorō : Mount Kurobegorō – Mount Kitanomata – (Mount Tarō) – Tarōdaira hut – Yakushi mountain pass – Yakushi plain – Yakushi mountain cottage – Mount Yakushi. There are several route for Mount Kurobegorō.

=== Mountain hut ===
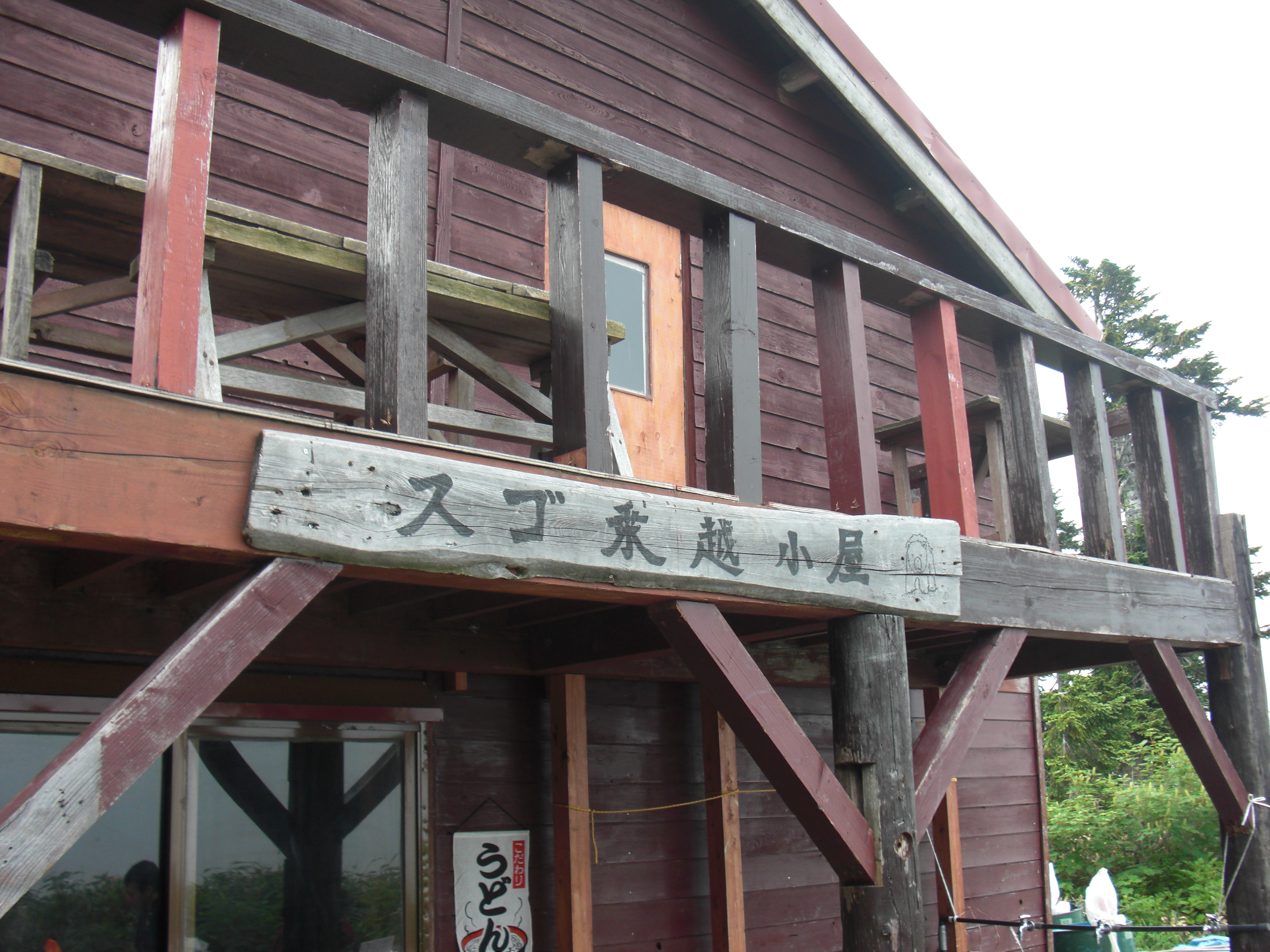
Sugonokkoshi hut

Thera are several Mountain hut around Mount Yakushi. Yakushi mountain cottage is the nearest hut.

- Sugonokkoshi hut (スゴ乗越小屋, Sugonokkoshi-goya) – in the col between Mount Ecchuzawa and Mount Hazama (with Campsite), 50 person accommodation
- Yakushi mountain cottage (薬師岳山荘, Yakushidake-sansō) – between Mount Yakushi and Yakushi plain, 60 person accommodation
- Yakushizawa hut (薬師沢小屋, Yakushizawa-goya) – between Mount Taro and Kumonotaira, on Kurobe River ashore, 60 person accommodation
- Tarōdaira hut (太郎平小屋, Tarōdaira-goya) – between Yakushi mountain pass and Mount Tarō (with Campsite on Yakushi mountain pass), 150 person accommodation
- Kitanomata hut (北ノ俣避難小屋, Kitanomata-goya) – in the col between Mount Teraji and Mount Kitanomata (Shelter hut), 8 person accommodation
- Kurobegorō hut (黒部五郎小舎, Kurobegorō-goya) – in the col between Mount Kurobegorō and Mount Mitsumatarenge (with Campsite), 60 person accommodation
- Mitsumata mountain cottage (三俣山荘, Mitsumata-sansō) – in the col between Mount Mitsumatagenge and Mount Washiba (with Campsite), 70 person accommodation

=== Alpine plant ===
The upper part of this mountain is situated in Tree line region, Siberian Dwarf Pine and Alpine plant grow naturally. There are quite a lot of kinds of alpine plant in the surrounding, and it is selected to "the 100 famous Japanese mountains of flower" by Sumie Tanaka.

- around Yakushi plain : Phyllodoce aleutica, Nephrophyllidium, Gentiana thunbergii var. minor, Anemone narcissiflora, Trollius japonicus, Siberian Dwarf Pine etc.
- around Yakushi mountain pass : Paris japonica, Maianthemum dilatatum, Caltha palustris etc.
- around Tarōdaira hut : Veratrum stamineum, Geum pentapetalum, Geranium yesoemse var. nipponicum, Lysichiton camtschatcense, Ranunculus acris, Pedicularis chamissonis var. japonica, Eriophorum vaginatum etc.

| Anemone narcissiflora | Caltha palustris | Paris japonica | Ranunculus acris | Siberian Dwarf Pine |

== Geography ==
=== Nearby mountains ===
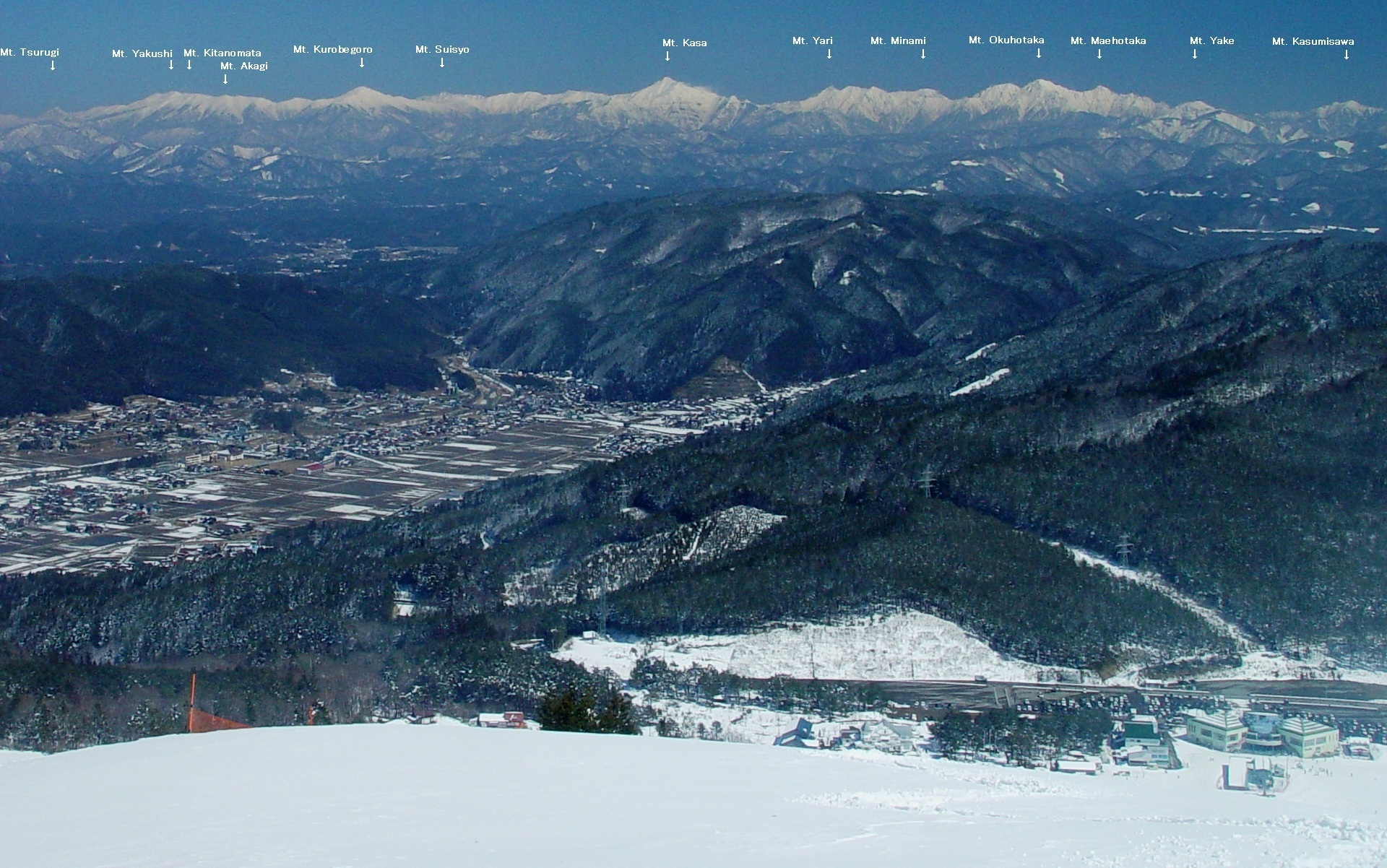
Hida Mountains seen from Mount Kurai

| Image | Mountain | Elevation | Distance from the Top | Note |
|---|---|---|---|---|
| | Mt. Tate 立山 | 3,015 m (9,892 ft) | 13.7 km (8.5 mi) | 100 Famous Japanese Mountains |
| | Mt. Ecchuzawa 越中沢岳 | 2,591.42 m (8,502 ft) | 6.2 km (3.9 mi) | |
| | Mt. Akaushi 赤牛岳 | 2,864.23 m (9,397 ft) | 5.3 km (3.3 mi) | 200 Famous Japanese Mountains |
| | Mt. Yakushi 薬師岳 | 2,926.01 m (9,600 ft) | 0 km (0.0 mi) | 100 Famous Japanese Mountains |
| | Mt. Kitanamata 北ノ俣岳 | 2,662 m (8,734 ft) | 6.0 km (3.7 mi) | |
| | Mt. Suishō 水晶岳 | 2,986 m (9,797 ft) | 7.0 km (4.3 mi) | another name is Mount Kuro; 100 Famous Japanese Mountains |
| | Mt. Kurobegorō 黒部五郎岳 | 2,839.58 m (9,316 ft) | 8.5 km (5.3 mi) | 100 Famous Japanese Mountains |

=== Rivers ===
The mountain is the source of the following rivers, each of which flows to the Sea of Japan.

- tributary of the Jōganji River
- tributaries of the Kurobe River

== Scenery of Mount Yakushi ==
| from Mt. Kotanomata | from Mt. Mitsumatarenge | from Mt. Suishō | from Mt. Akazawa |

== See also ==
- Hida Mountains
- Chūbu-Sangaku National Park
- List of mountains in Japan
- 100 Famous Japanese Mountains
