= Mount Echigo-Komagatake =

Mountain in Niigata Prefecture, Japan

- 越後駒ヶ岳
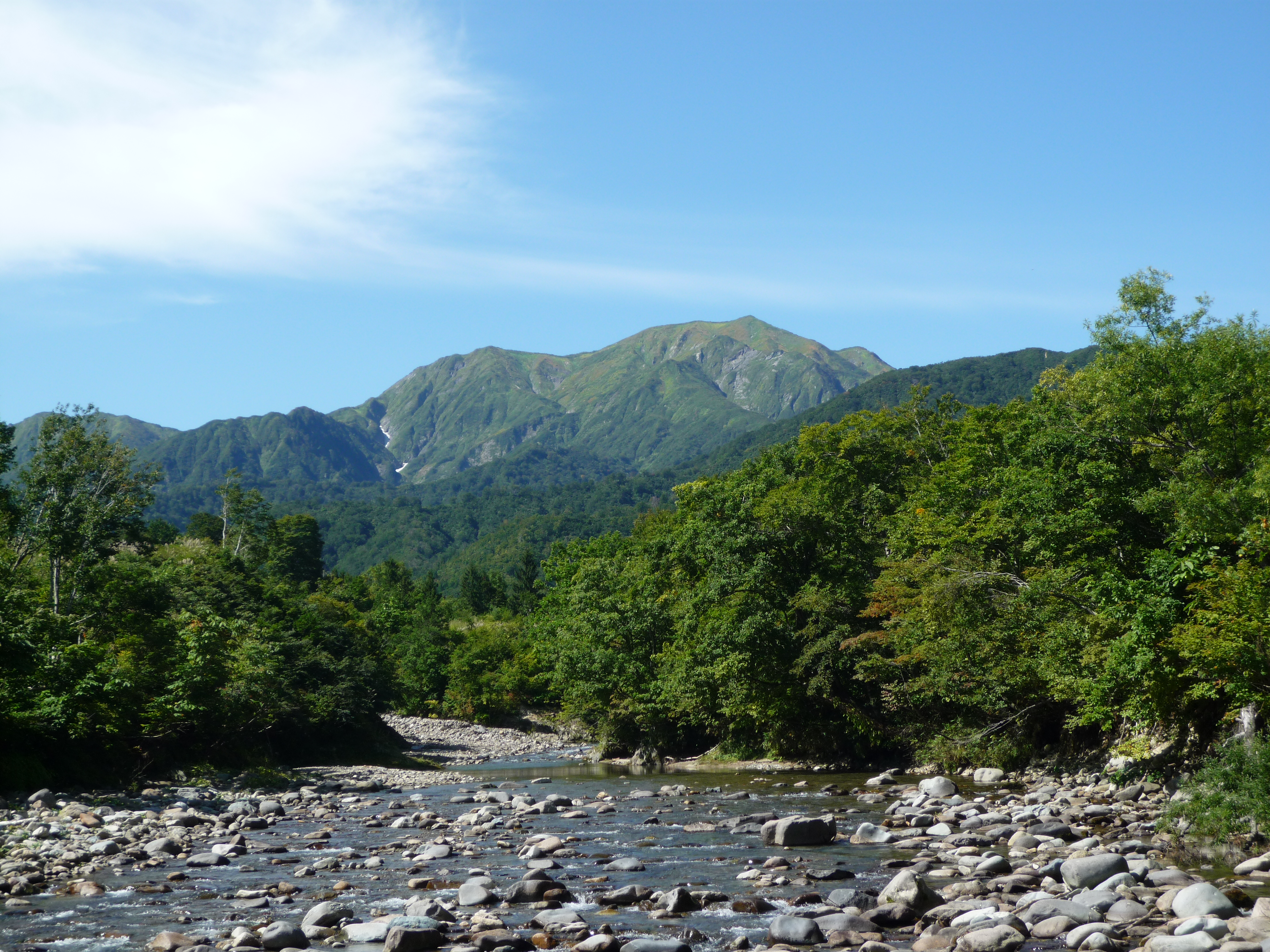
- View from Ginzandaira (September 2009)

Highest point
- Elevation: 2,002.7 m (6,571 ft)
- Listing: List of mountains and hills of Japan by height 100 Famous Japanese Mountains
- Coordinates: 37°07′25″N 139°04′31″E

Geography
- Location within Niigata Prefecture
- Location: Niigata Prefecture, Japan
- Topo map(s): Geospatial Information Authority 25000:1 八海山; 50000:1 日光

Mount Echigo-Komagatake or Uonuma-Komagatake (越後駒ヶ岳 or 魚沼駒ヶ岳) is a mountain located on the border of Uonuma and Minamiuonuma, Niigata Prefecture, Japan, with an elevation of 2,002.7 m (6,571 ft). It is one of the 100 famous mountains in Japan. Mount Echigo-Komagatake, along with Nakanodake and Mount Hakkai, is also one of the three great mountains of Echigo, the old name for this area of Niigata Prefecture.

== Geography ==
Mount Echigo-Komagatake lies in central part of Echigo Mountains, a mountain range over Niigata, Fukushima, and Gunma Prefecture. Between late autumn and early spring, large amounts of snow fall in this region because of the monsoon from Siberia, with an average of 3 to 4 meters. Avalanches eroded the surface of the mountain and formed steep precipices, especially on the west and north face. Hikers can see snow on the mountain even in late summer. Thanks to the heavy snowfall, this mountain is the source of several rivers such as the Kitanomata River, the Mizunashi River, and the Sanashi River, which all flow into the Sea of Japan. Such abundant water is used mainly for paddy fields, and hydroelectricity.

In contrast to the winter season, summers are hot and humid and there are thunderstorms in the afternoon almost every day during the summer. Hikers must pay attention to hyperthermia and thunderbolts.

== Climbing routes ==
There are several climbing routes to the mountain's peak. The easiest and most popular route is from Shiori Mountain Pass. (Japanese: 枝折峠) Other routes are the Kushigahana route, the Komanoyu route, and the Echigo Sanzan mountain ridge route. All routes are long and demanding, but special technique isn't needed. It's possible to get back to the starting points except for the last one if climbers start in the early morning. The best climbing season is between June and early October.

== Transportation ==
Some bus routes are available from train stations (Muikamachi, Urasa or Koide) to the starting points. However, they are much less convenient than by car and taxi. At the starting points, several dozens of parking lots are available for free, but during the climbing season, the parking lots are quickly inundated with a lot of cars.

== Facilities ==
The only mountain lodge on the mountain is called Komanokoya (Japanese:駒の小屋), which is located about 100 meters below the summit. The caretakers stay between late April and the end of October. Without a reservation, it costs around 2000 Japanese yen to stay there, excluding food costs. During the snow season, climbers often use the lodge for shelter.
