= Mount Goryū =

Mountain in the Hida Mountains, Japan

- 五竜岳
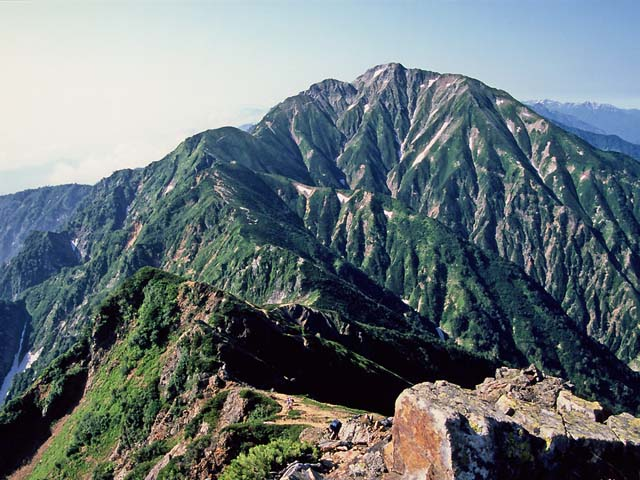

Highest point
- Elevation: 2,814 m (9,232 ft)
- Prominence: 384 m (1,260 ft)
- Listing: List of mountains and hills of Japan by height
- Coordinates: 36°39′30″N 137°45′10″E

Naming
- Language of name: Japanese

Geography
- Location within Japan
- Location: Kurobe, Toyama and Ōmachi, Nagano, Japan
- Parent range: Hida Mountains (Ushirotateyama Mountains)

Mount Goryū (五竜岳, Goryū-dake) is a mountain in the Ushirotateyama Mountains in the Hida Mountains. The mountain body straddles Kurobe, Toyama and Ōmachi, Nagano, and the summit is mostly located on the Toyama side. It is one of the 100 Famous Japanese Mountains. It is sometimes written as Goryū-dake (五龍岳) with only "dragon" in the old font.
