= Obi Gonzaburō =

- 小尾 権三郎

Personal details
- Born: 1796 Suwa Domain, Shinano Province, Japan
- Died: 1819 (aged 22–23) Japan

Obi Gonzaburō (Japanese: 小尾 権三郎; 1796-1819) was a Japanese yamabushi credited with the first ascent of Mount Kaikoma. His Dharma name was Enmei Gyōja Hankō Hōin (延命行者鐇弘法印).

== Biography ==
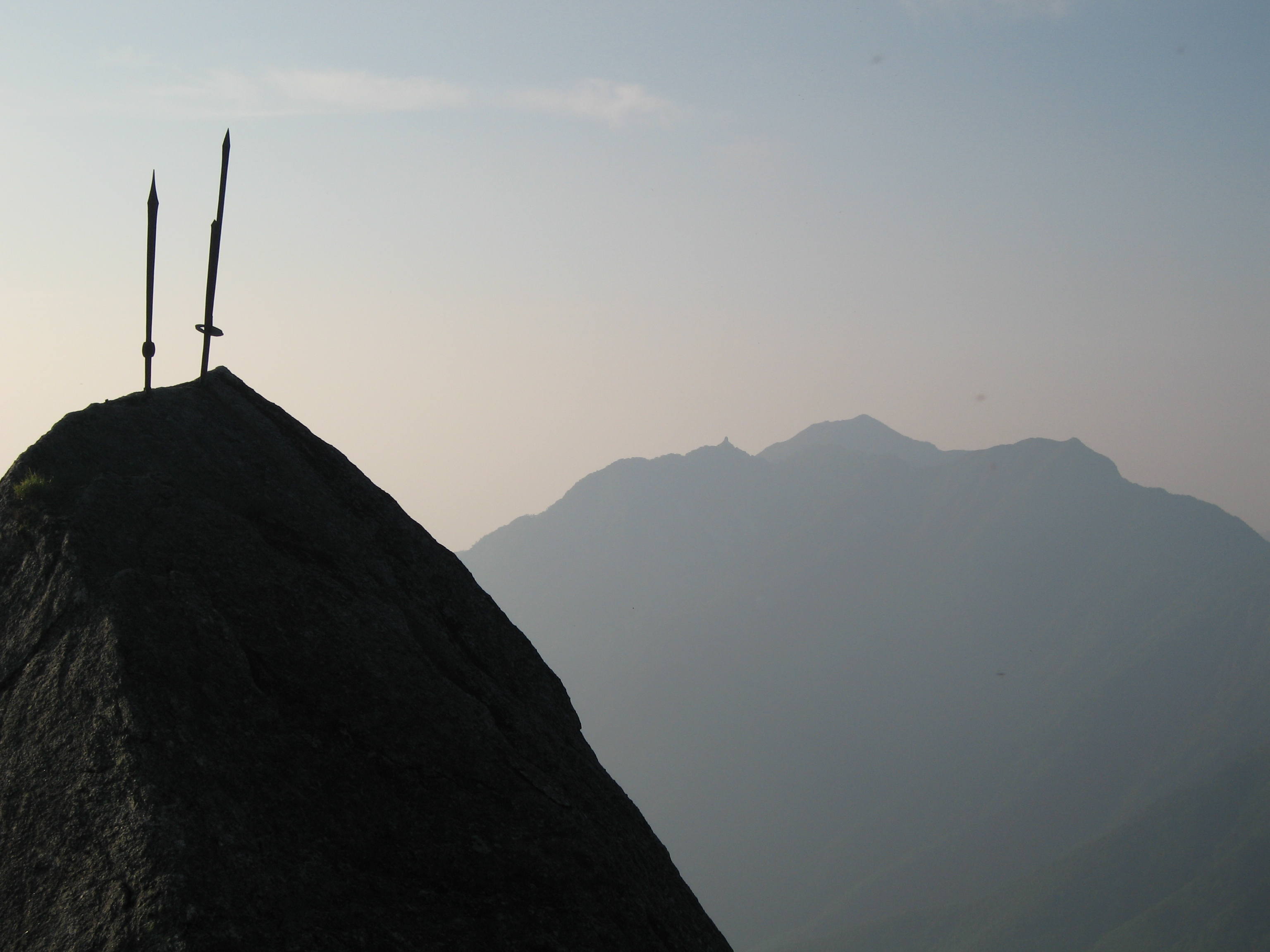
Swords at the peak of Mount Kaikoma

Obi Gonzaburō was born in Shinano Province. During the Great Tenmei famine (1782–1788), Gonzaburō’s father Obi Imaemon (小尾 今右衛門), an amateur yamabushi, became obsessed with the idea of establishing a shugendō pilgrimage trail to the peak of Mount Kaikoma. He hoped to save his destitute village by the karma of this deed. The aging Imaemon gave up after 12 years of repeated setbacks.

Imaemon expected Gonzaburō to complete his project, and subjected the boy to a regimen of shugendō training which included strenuous physical exercise, starvation, dehydration, and sleep deprivation. When Gonzaburō was 17 years old, Imaemon left him by a crossing on the Ojira River in Kai Province with only 10 days supply of rice. Gonzaburō returned home alive by climbing across the Akaishi Mountains alone.

In 1816, Gonzaburō led a small group of yamabushi in the first known ascent to the peak of Mount Kaikoma where they planted a sword. In 1819, he died under unclear circumstances. According to one version, Gonzaburō had himself buried alive to die while meditating inside the earth (土中入定, dochū-nyūjō). Before he died, Gonzaburō reportedly said that a curse would befall anyone who told the story of the first ascent of the mountain.

== Bibliography ==
- 藤森 Fujimori, 栄一 Eiichi (1970). 遥かなる信濃 Harukanaru Shinano (in Japanese). Japan: 学生社 Gakuseisha. NCID BN12890024.
