= Mount Kaikoma =

Mountain in Japan

- 甲斐駒ヶ岳
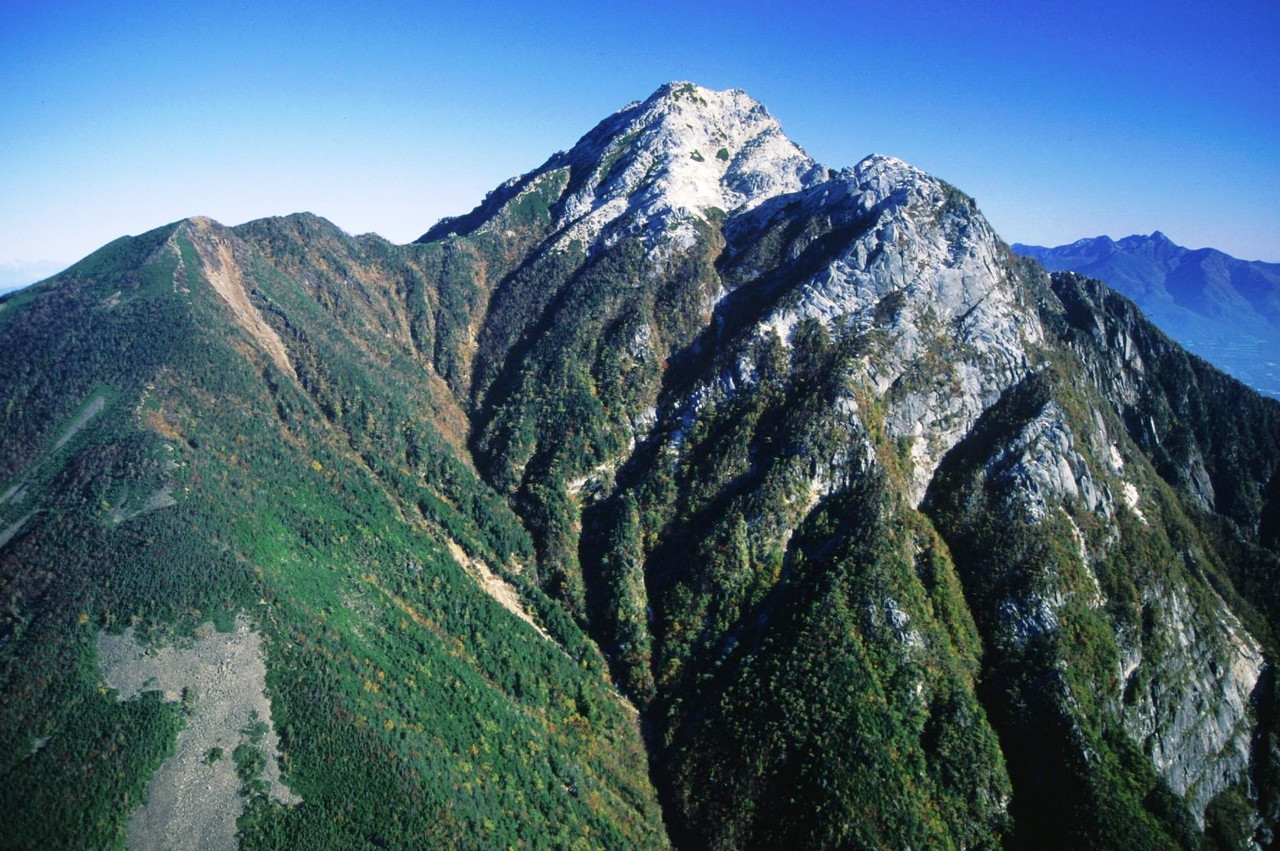
- Mount Kaikoma from Mount Kurisawa

Highest point
- Elevation: 2,967 m (9,734 ft)
- Listing: 100 Famous Japanese Mountains
- Coordinates: 35°45′28″N 138°14′12″E

Geography
- Location within Japan
- Location: Hokuto, Yamanashi Prefecture; Ina, Nagano Prefecture, Japan
- Parent range: Akaishi Mountains

Mount Kaikoma (甲斐駒ヶ岳, Kaikoma-ga-take) is a mountain of the Akaishi Mountains, located on the border of Hokuto in Yamanashi Prefecture, and Ina in Nagano Prefecture, in the Chūbu region of Japan.

== Geography ==
The peak is 2,967 m (9,734 ft) in elevation. Mount Kaikoma is protected within Minami Alps National Park. It is one of the landmark "100 Famous Japanese Mountains."

Mount Kaikoma is referred to as the eastern of the two mountains, while Mount Kisokoma is referred to as the western one. The top of the mountain appears white, because of the many white granite rock outcrops at the top of the mountain

=== Features ===
Mount Kaikoma is one of the centers of Japanese Shugendo in the region. The summit was first reached in the early 19th century by a shugenja named Obi Gonzaburō.

There are 18 or more mountains in Japan that are referred to as the "Komagatake (Koma Mountains)" (駒ヶ岳 Koma-ga-take). Mount Kaikoma is the tallest of them all, just beating out neighboring Mount Kisokoma by 11 m (36 ft).

The Ina Valley is located between Mount Kaikoma and Mount Kisokoma. Marishiten peak (摩利支天) is to the southeast.

=== Rivers ===
Rivers with headwaters on Mount Kaikoma include:

- a tributary of Fuji River
- a tributary of Tenryū River

== Mountaineering ==
=== Routes ===
The most popular route to climb this mountain is from Kitazawa Pass on Minami Alps Gravel Road. It takes four and half hours from the pass to the top.

The other major route is a traditional one on Kuroto-One, it takes eight hours to the top.

=== Mountain hut and campsite ===
There are mountain huts on Mount Kaikoma, that are opened during the mountain climbing season. There also are some specified campsites. A large one around "Kitazawa-Tōge (北沢峠)" is used as base camp for climbing Mount Kaikoma and Mount Senjō.

== Nearby mountains ==
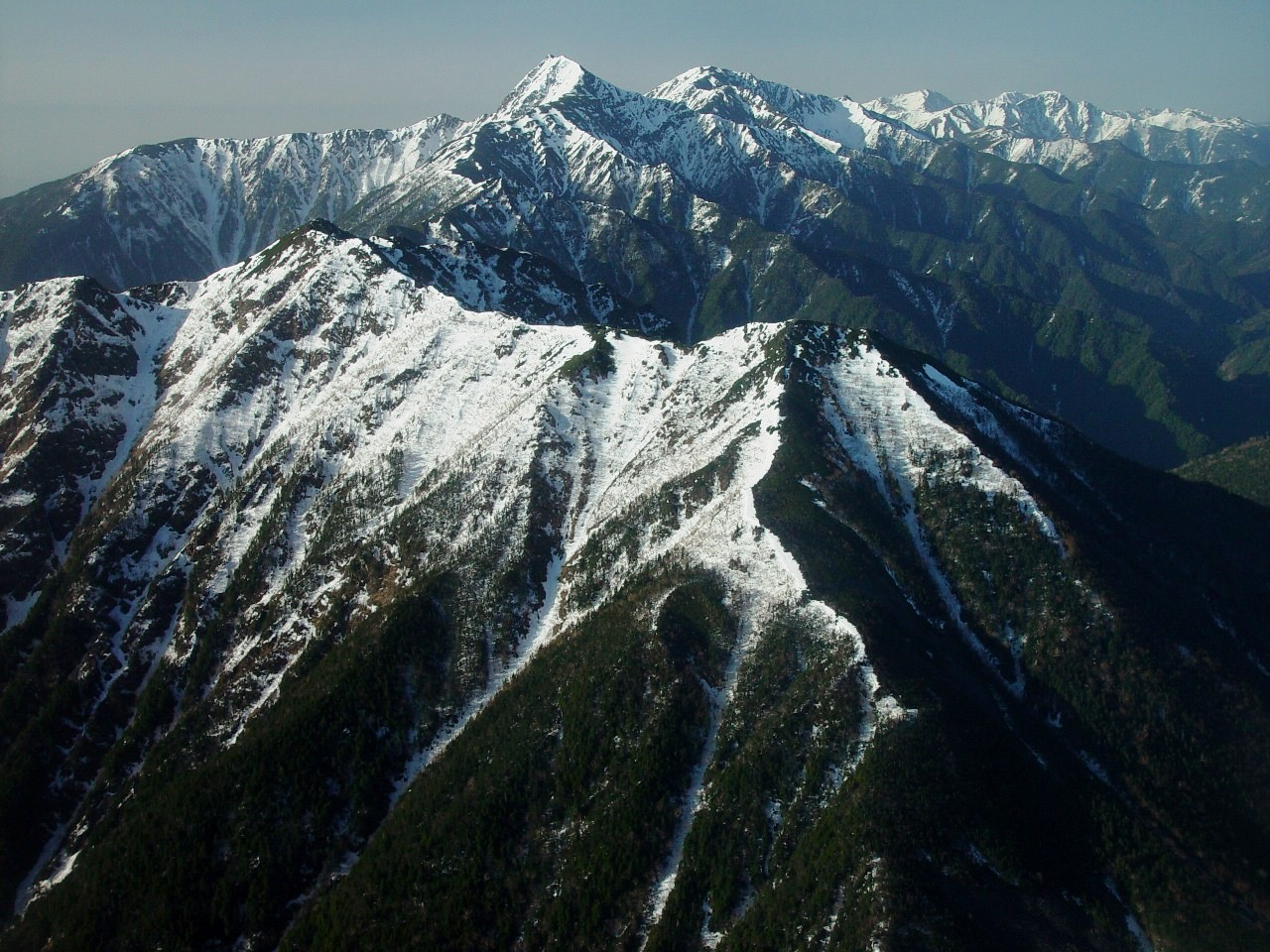
Nearby Mountains of Mount Kaikoma (Akaishi Mountains)

It is on the main ridge line in the northern part of the Akaishi Mountains.

Image	Mountain	Japanese	Elevation	Distance from the Top	Note
	Mt. Nokogiri	鋸岳	2,685 m (8,809 ft)	3.4 km (2.1 mi)	200 Famous
	Mt. Kaikoma	甲斐駒ヶ岳	2,967 m (9,734 ft)	0 km (0 mi)	100 Famous
	Marishiten	摩利支天	about 2,820 m (9,252 ft)	0.4 km (0.2 mi)	Southeast Peak
	Mount Komatsu	駒津峰	about 2,752 m (9,029 ft)	0.8 km (0.5 mi)	
	Mt. Senjō	仙丈ヶ岳	3,033 m (9,951 ft)	6.4 km (4.0 mi)	100 Famous
	Mt. Hōō	鳳凰山	2,840 m (9,318 ft)	8.7 km (5.4 mi)	100 Famous
	Mt. Kita	北岳	3,193 m (10,476 ft)	9.3 km (5.8 mi)	the highest mountain in Akaishi Mountains; 100 Famous

== Gallery ==
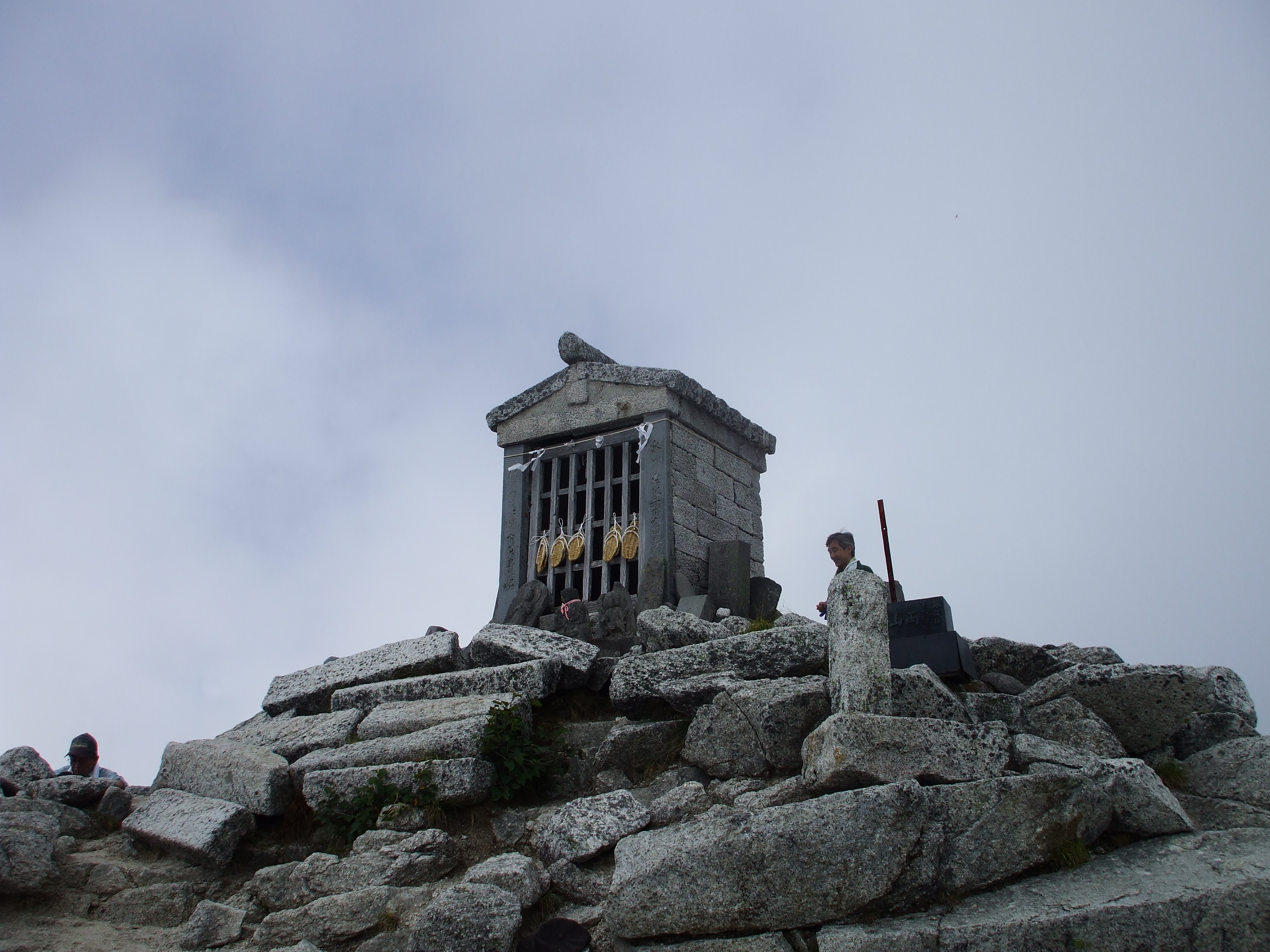
Top of Mount Kaikoma
Shinto shrine "Koma-ga-Take"

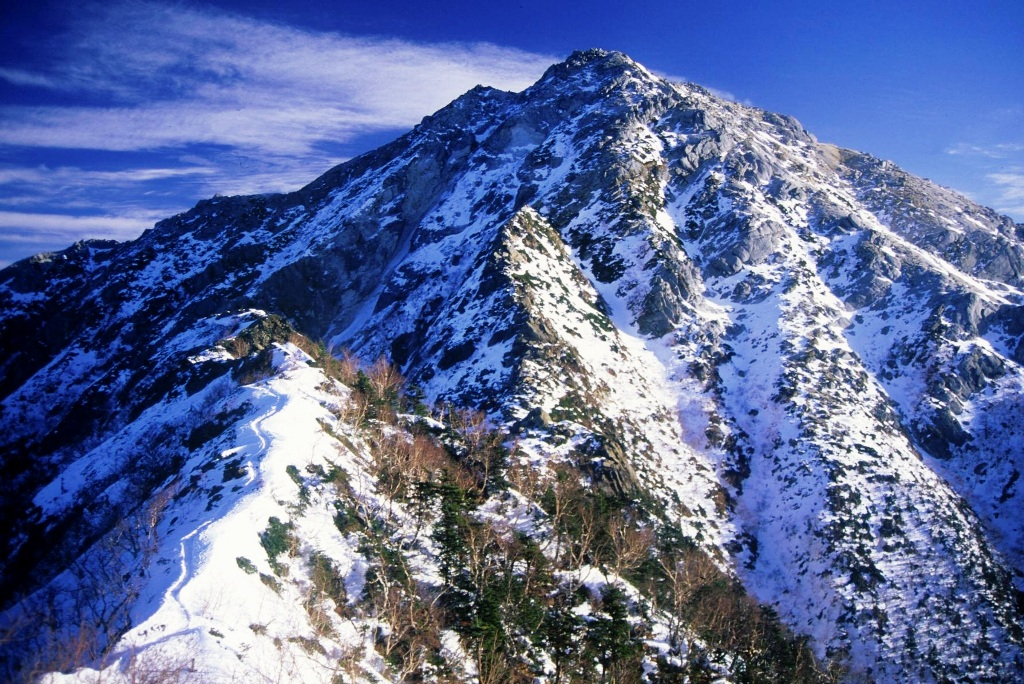
Mount Kaikoma
from Mount Komatsu

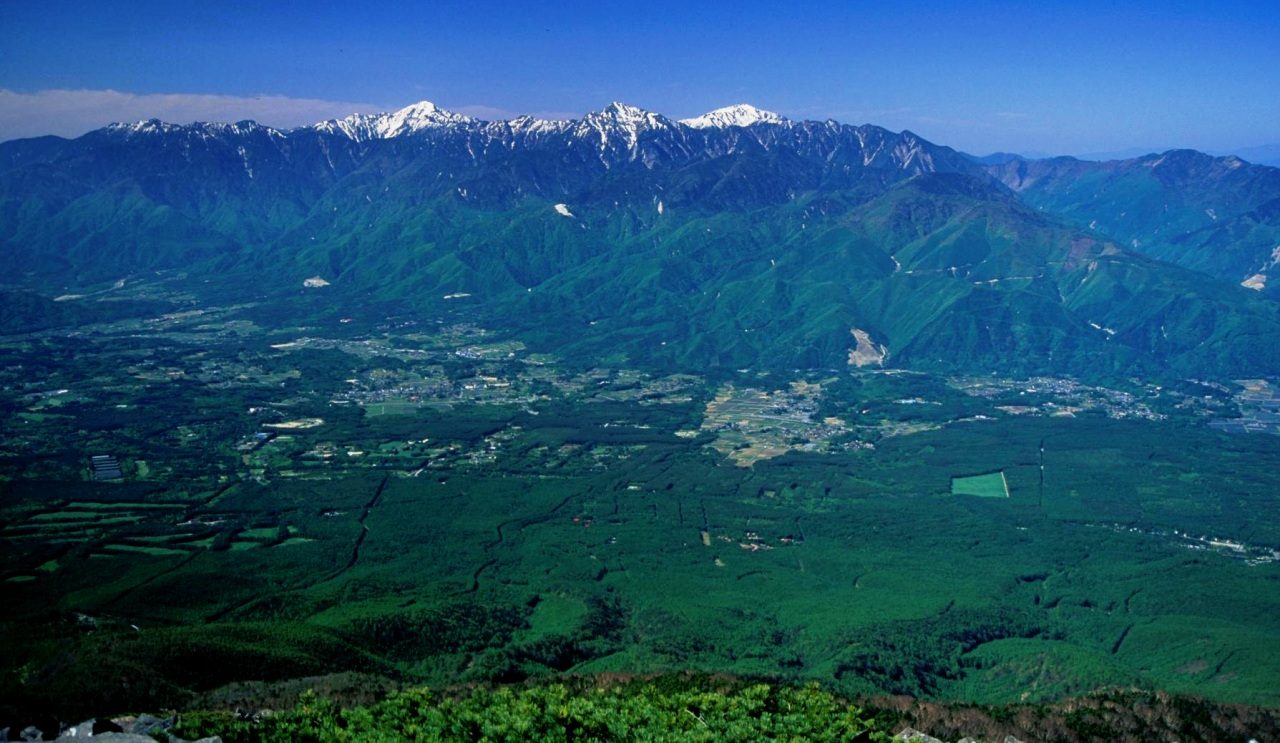
Mount Kaikoma
from Yatsugatake

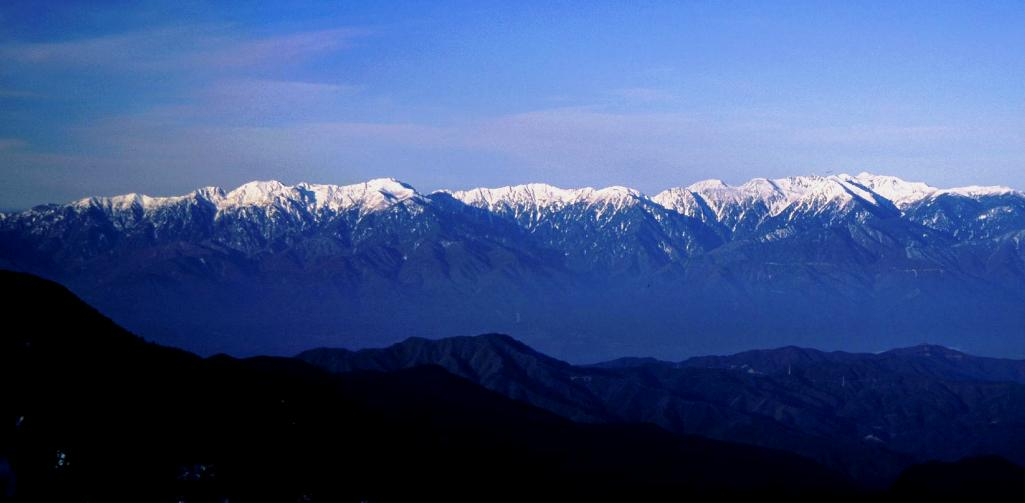
Kiso Mountains
from Mount Kaikoma

== See also ==
- 100 Famous Japanese Mountains
- Akaishi Mountains
- Minami Alps National Park
- Komagatake
