= Mount Hōō =

Mountain in Japan

- 鳳凰山
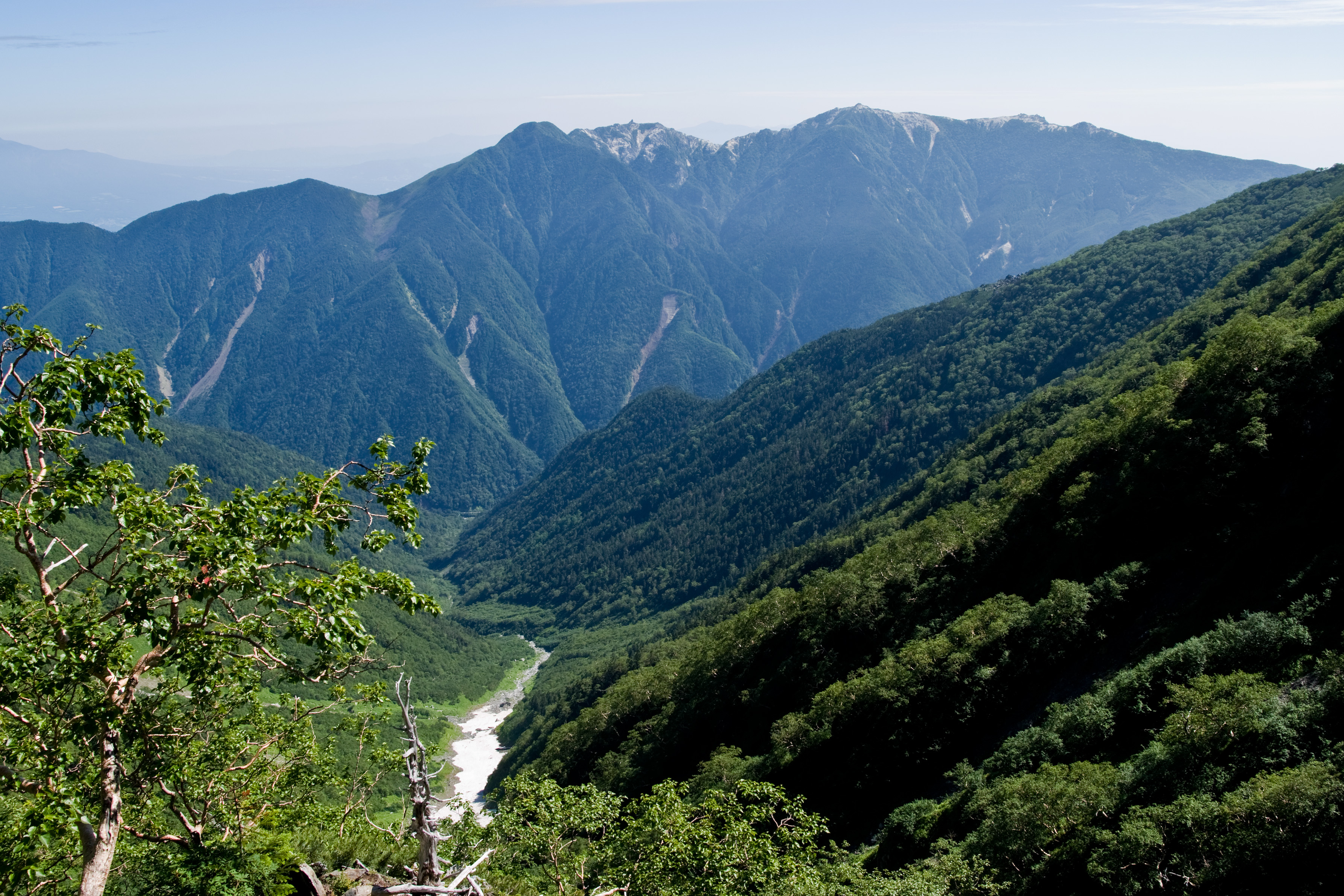
- Mount Hōō as seen from Ōkambazawa

Highest point
- Elevation: 2,840 m (9,320 ft)
- Listing: • List of mountains and hills of Japan by height • 100 Famous Japanese Mountains
- Coordinates: 35°42′06″N 138°18′16″E

Naming
- Language of name: Japanese

Geography
- Location within Japan
- Location: Yamanashi Prefecture, Japan
- Parent range: Akaishi Mountains

Geology
- Mountain type: Granite

Mount Hōō (鳳凰山, Hōō-zan) is located in the western portion of Yamanashi Prefecture, Japan. Because the mountain has three peaks, it is also called Hōō Sanzan (鳳凰三山). It is in Minami Alps National Park and is one of the 100 Famous Japanese Mountains.

== Outline ==
Mount Hōō has three peaks:

Image	Mountain	Elevation	Triangulation station	Note
	Jizō-dake 地蔵岳	2,764 m (9,068 ft)		The rock of the huge Granite in the top is called Obelisk. Mountain hut Hōō in the east
	Kannon-dake 観音岳	2,840 m (9,318 ft)	(stopped)	the highest point
	Yakushi-dake 薬師岳	2,780 m (9,121 ft)		. Mountain hut Yakushi-dake in the south

Mount Hōō is separated from most of the other mountains in the Akaishi range, giving a wider view of the surrounding mountains. Also, most mountains in the range have a reddish-brown color ("Akaishi" means "red stone" in Japanese), but Mount Hōō and Mount Kaikoma are the two exceptions, as they are granite mountains.

== History ==
Metal ore was found in the mountain during the Sengoku period and, by the Edo period, the mountain was exploited for its metals and forest products.

- In 1904, Walter Weston became the first to climb the obelisk on top of Jizōdake.
- On June 1, 1964, this area was specified to the Minami Alps National Park.
- In 1990, Sumie Tanaka (田中澄江 Tanaka Sumie) completed New Flowers of the 100 Mountains, which featured many of the alpine plants on Mount Hōō.

== Geography ==
=== Nearby mountains ===
Mount Hōō is on the subridge (from Mount Komatsu) of the main ridge line in the northern part of the Akaishi Mountains.

Image	Mountain	Elevation	Distance from the Top	Note
	Mt. Senjō 仙丈ヶ岳	3,033 m (9,951 ft)	11.1 km (6.9 mi)	100 Famous Japanese Mountains
	Mt. Kaikoma 甲斐駒ヶ岳	2,967 m (9,734 ft)	8.7 km (5 mi)	100 Famous Japanese Mountains
	Mt. Asayo アサヨ峰	2,799 m (9,183 ft)	6.6 km (4.1 mi)	
	Mt. Kita 北岳	3,193 m (10,476 ft)	6.7 km (4.2 mi)	Tallest of the Akaishi Mountains; 100 Famous Japanese Mountains
	Mt. Fuji 富士山	3,776 m (12,388 ft)	56.4 km (35.0 mi)	Tallest mountain in Japan; 100 Famous Japanese Mountains

=== Rivers ===
The mountain is the source of the following rivers, each of which flows to the Pacific Ocean.

- Noro River (a tributary of the Fuji River)
- Ōtake River, Kotake River (tributaries of the Tenryū River)

== Gallery ==
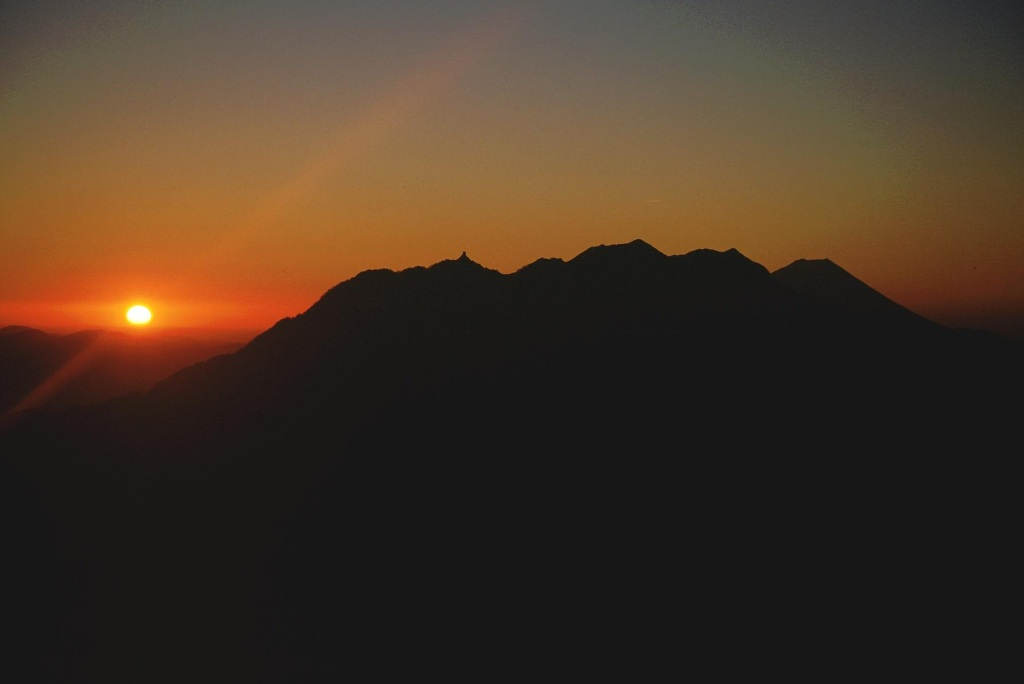
Mount Hōō and Mount Fuji from Mount Komatsu at the sunrise

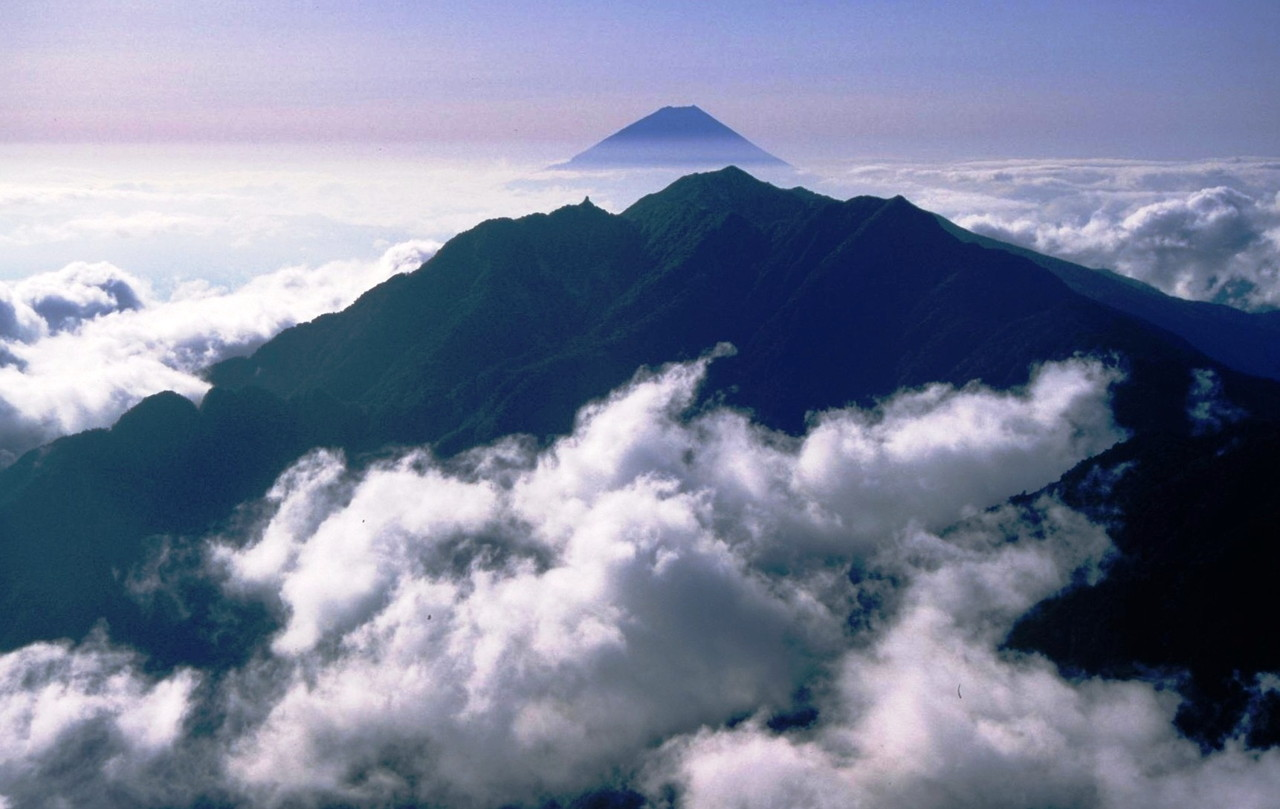
Mount Hōō and Mount Fuji from Mount Kaikoma

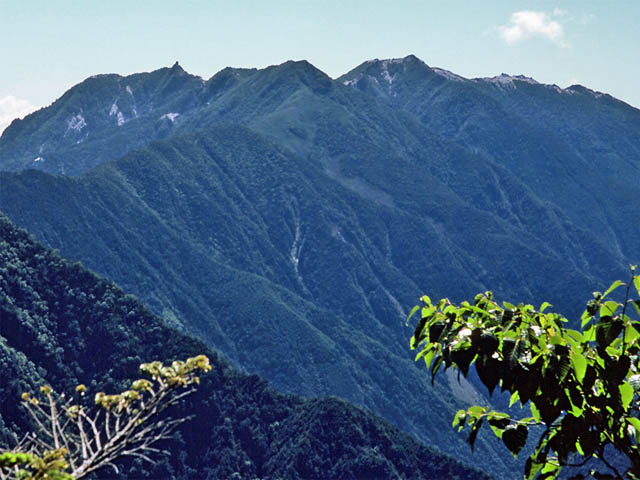
Mount Hōō

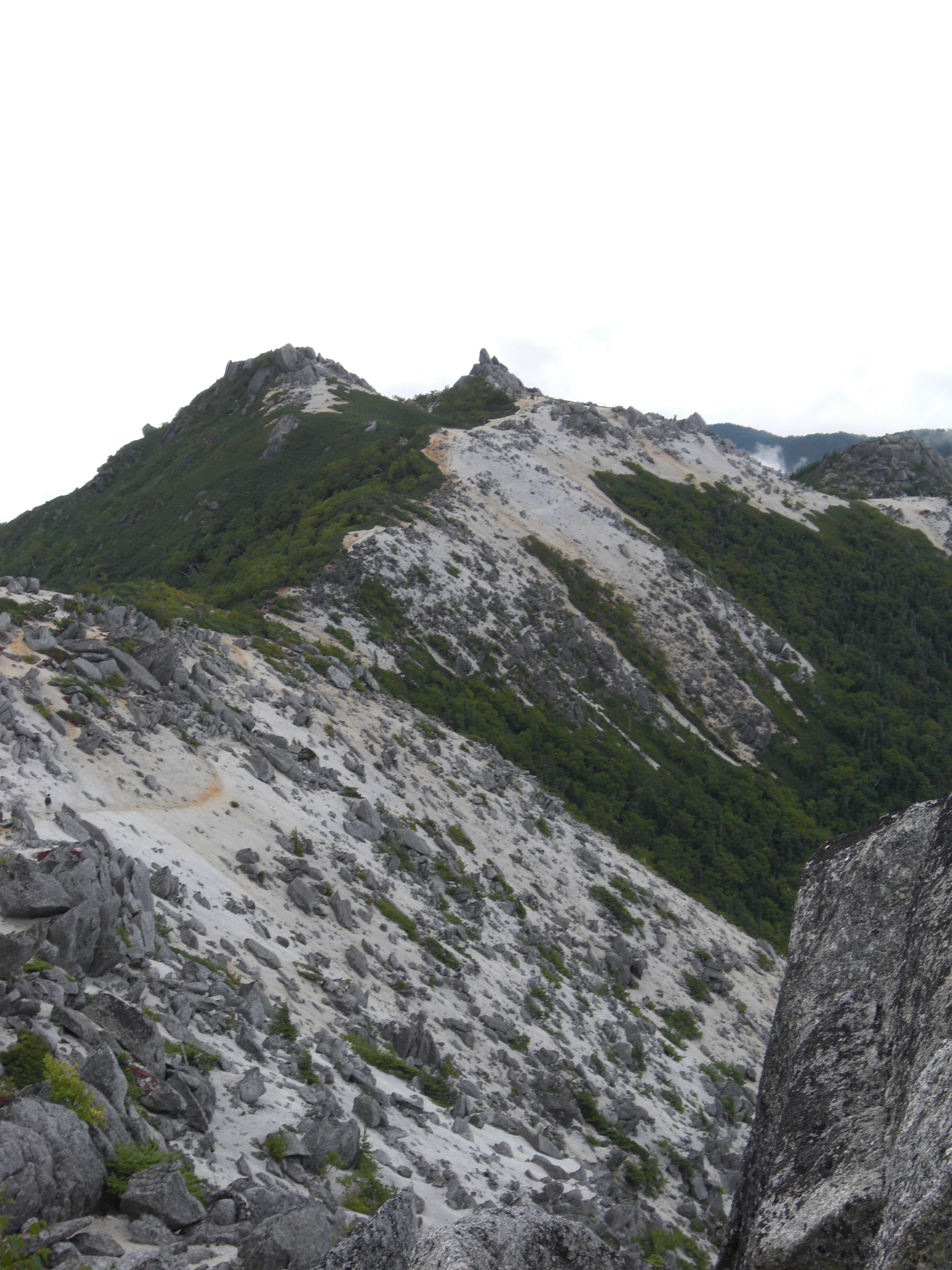
Mount Yakushidake from Mount Kannondake

== See also ==
- 100 Famous Japanese Mountains
- Akaishi Mountains
- Minami Alps National Park
