= Mount Senjō (Akaishi) =

Mountain in Honshu, Japan

- 仙丈ヶ岳
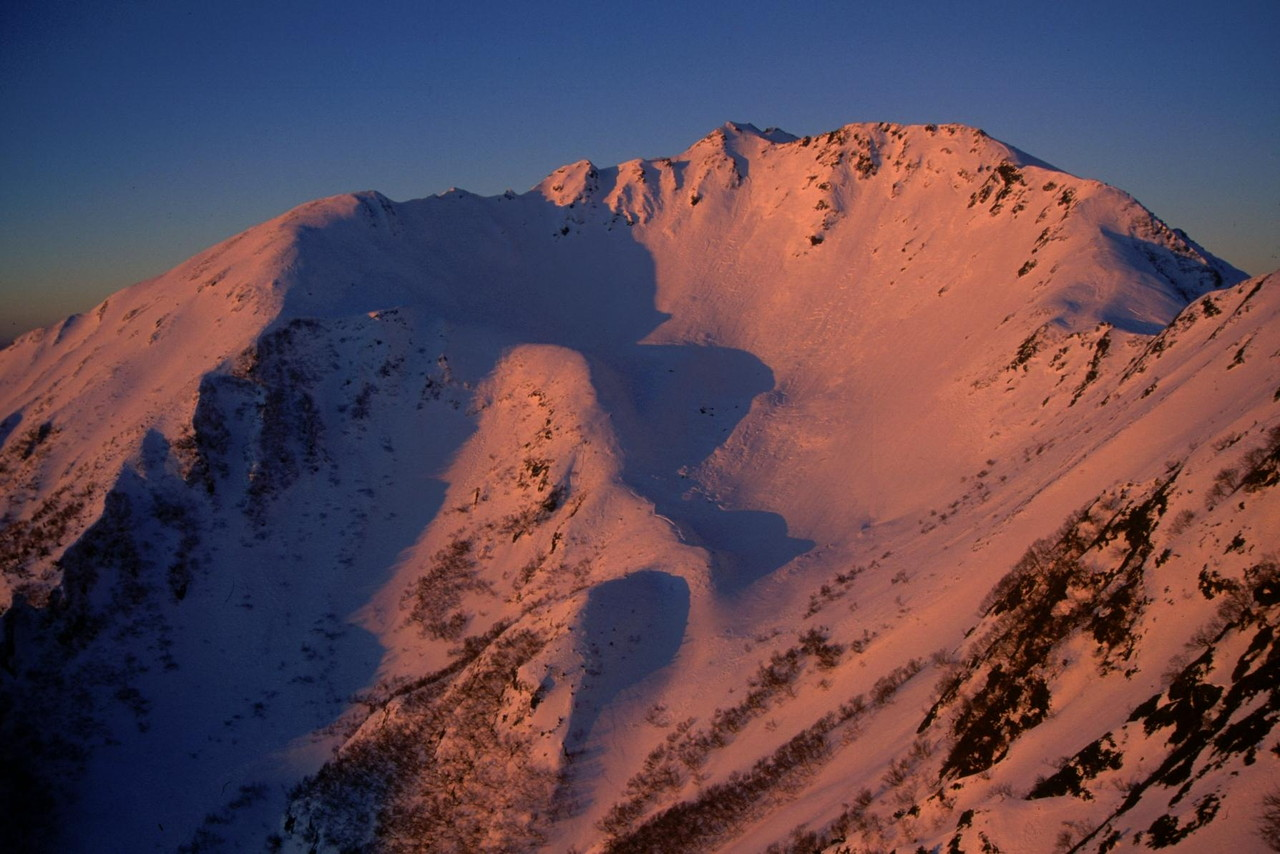
- Mount Senjō from Mount Ko-Senjō

Highest point
- Elevation: 3,032.6 m (9,949 ft)
- Prominence: 733 m (2,405 ft)
- Listing: 100 Famous Japanese Mountains; List of mountains and hills of Japan by height
- Coordinates: 35°43′12″N 138°11′00″E

Naming
- Language of name: Japanese

Geography
- Location within Japan
- Location: Minami-Alps, Yamanashi and Ina, Nagano, Japan
- Parent range: Akaishi Mountains
- Topo map: Geographical Survey Institute 25000:1 仙丈ヶ岳

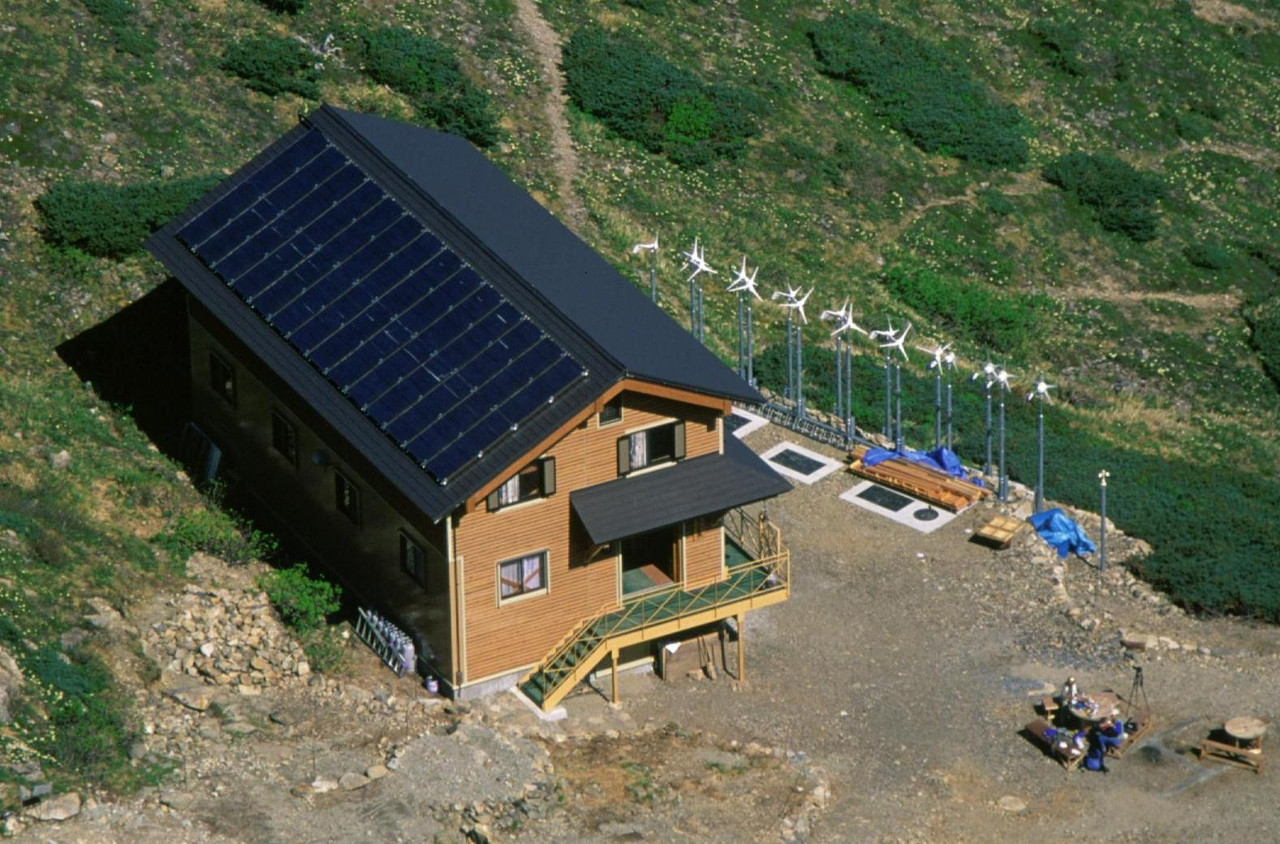
Mountain hut Senjō

Mount Senjō (仙丈ヶ岳, Senjō-ga-take) is a 3,032.6-metre-high (9,949.5 ft) mountain on the border of Minami-Alps, Yamanashi, and Ina, Nagano, in Japan. This mountain is one of the major peaks of the Akaishi Mountains, and is one of the most popular peaks in the range. This mountain is also one of the 100 Famous Japanese Mountains.

== Outline ==
Mount Senjō is one of the destinations in Akaishi Mountains for tourists. This mountain has three major peaks, which are Senjō-ga-take, Dai-Senjō-ga-take, and Ko-Senjō-ga-take. This mountain can be accessed easily over Minami Alps Gravel Road. This mountain is called 'the queen of Minami-Alps' because of its elegant looks. This area is in Minami Alps National Park that was established on June 1, 1964.

== Mountaineering ==
British Walter Weston visited Japan several times and wrote in 1896 the book Mountaineering and Exploring in the Japanese Alps. He climbed Mount Senjō in 1904.

=== Route ===
The most popular route to the top of this mountain is from Kitazawa Pass. To the Kitazawa Pass, climbers use buses from Todai-guchi Bus Stop or Hirogawara Bus Stop. It takes about four hours from the pass to the mountain.

=== Mountain hut and camp site ===
There are some mountain huts in the surrounding, and they are opened during the climbing mountain season. There is a "Mountain hut Senjō" in the Yambusawa Cirque near the top of the mountain. Moreover, there is one camp specification ground. That is the large one around "Kitazawa Pass (北沢峠)" that is used as base camp for Mount Senjō or Mount Kaikoma.

== Alpine plants and animals ==
This mountain is famous for many Alpine plants on the upper part of the mountains above the tree line. Siberian dwarf pine can be seen in the place and rock ptarmigan and spotted nutcracker live here as well. Japanese serow and sika deer live in the forest belt in the hillside in the mountain. Then this mountain is selected to " 100 famous Mountains with flowers" and "New 100 famous Mountains with flowers" by Sumie Tanaka.

== Geography ==
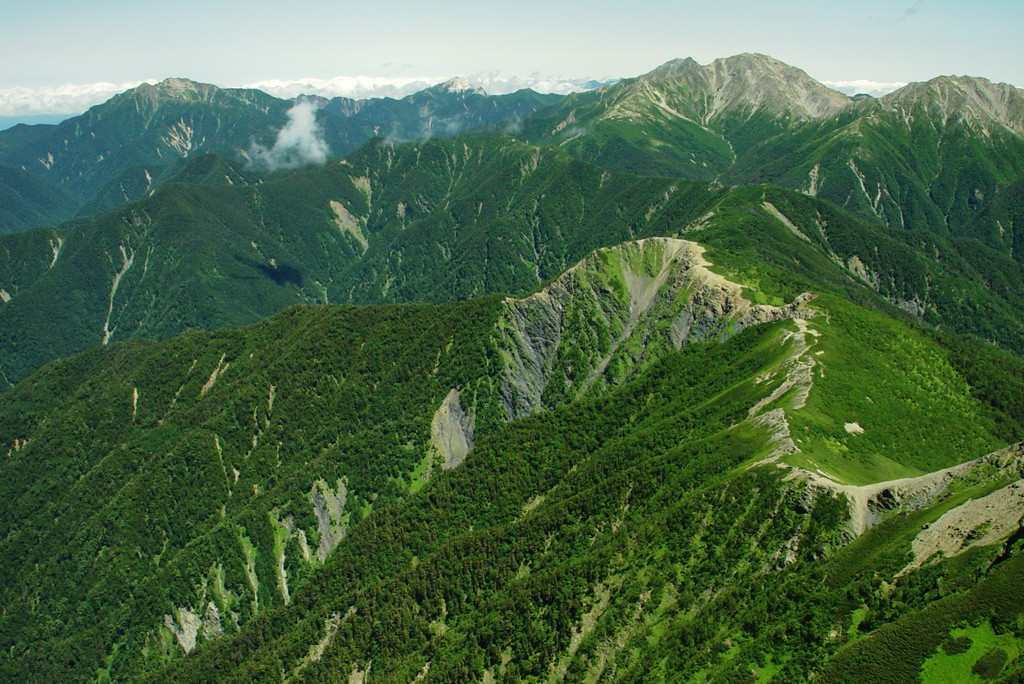
Mount Senjō and Mount Aino from Mount Shiomi

=== Nearby mountains ===
It is on the main ridge line in the northern part of the Akaishi Mountains. There are three cirques: "Yabusawa", "Ko-Senjō" and "Dai-Senjō". The ridge on the north side is called "Horseback" ("Uma-no-Se").

Image	Mountain	Japanese	Height	Distance from the Top	Note
	Mt. Nokogiri	鋸岳	2,685 m (8,809 ft)	7.0 km (4.3 mi)	200 Famous
	Mt. Kaikoma	甲斐駒ヶ岳	2,967 m (9,734 ft)	6.4 km (4 mi)	100 Famous
	Mt. Ko-Senjō	小仙丈ヶ岳	2,855 m (9,367 ft)	0.3 km (0.2 mi)	Cirque Ko-Senjō
	Mt. Senjō	仙丈ヶ岳	3,033 m (9,951 ft)	6.4 km (4.0 mi)	100 Famous
	Mt. Dai-Senjō	大仙丈ヶ岳	2,975 m (9,760 ft)	0.7 km (0.4 mi)	Cirque Dai-Senjō
	Mt. Kita	北岳	3,193 m (10,476 ft)	7.1 km (4.4 mi)	the highest mountain in Akaishi Mountains; 100 Famous
	Mt. Hōō	鳳凰山	2,840 m (9,318 ft)	11.1 km (6.9 mi)	100 Famous
	Mt. Shiomi	塩見岳	3,047 m (9,997 ft)	16.2 km (10.1 mi)	100 Famous

=== Source of river ===
Rivers with their source here flow to the Pacific Ocean.

- Noro River (tributary of Fuji River)
- Todai River, Mibu River (tributary of Tenryū River)

== Gallery ==
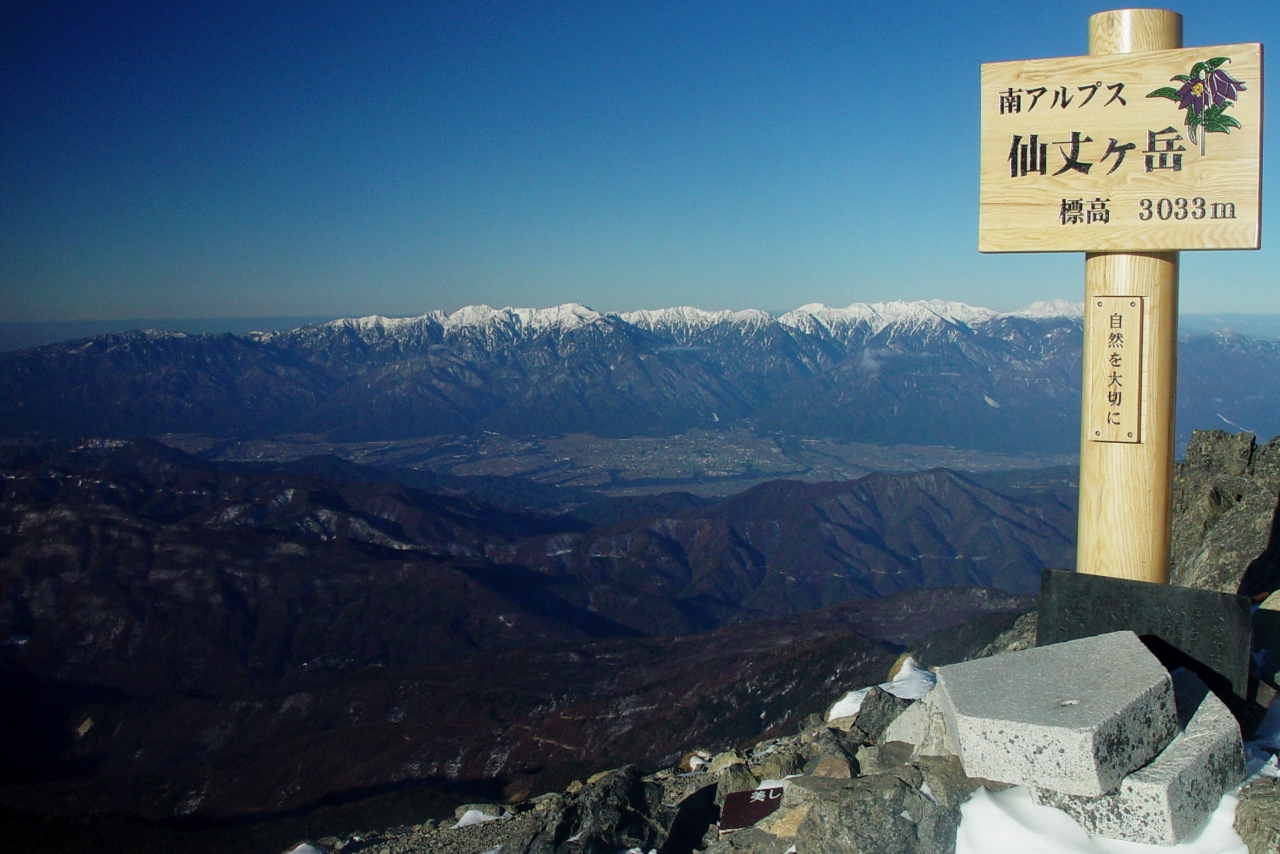
Kiso Mountains from top of Mount Senjō

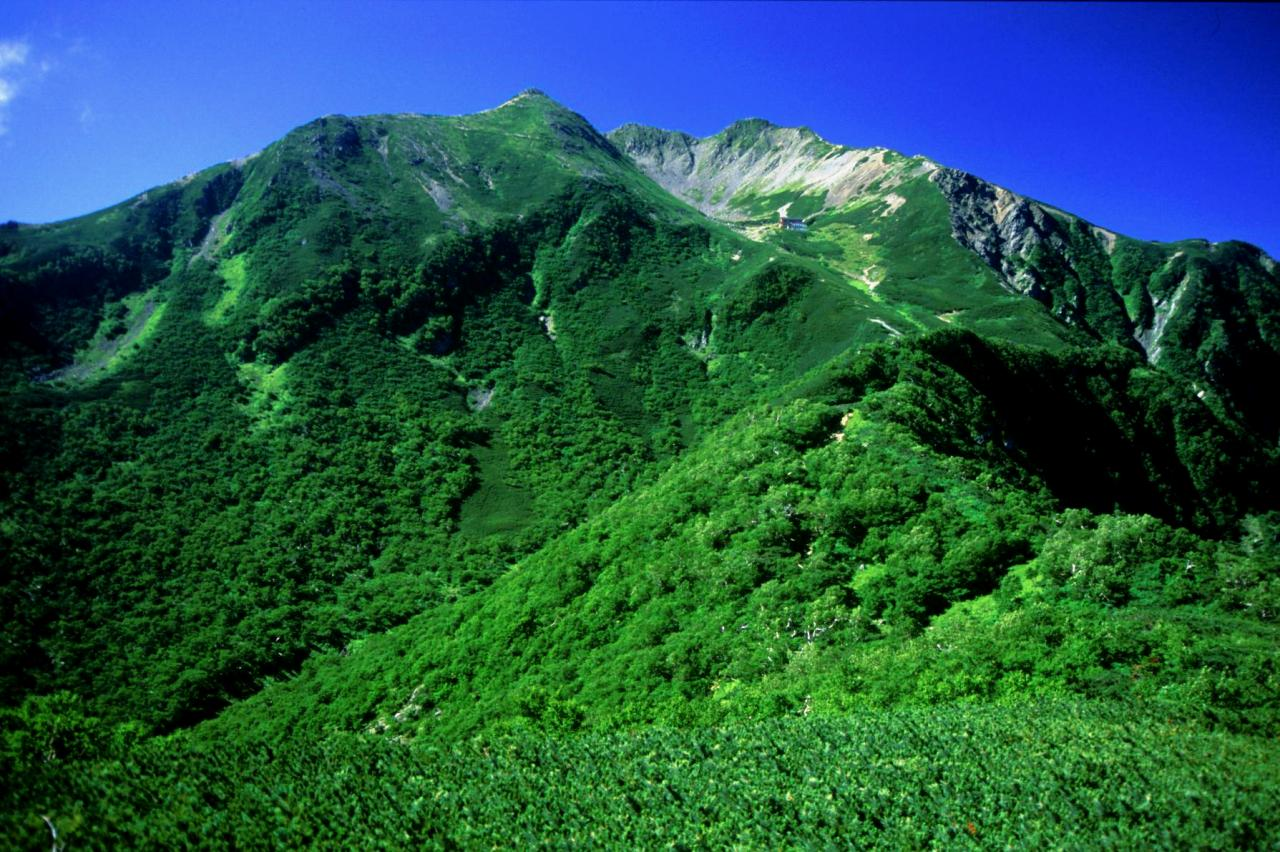
Mount Senjō and Yabusawa Cirque from Uma-no-Se

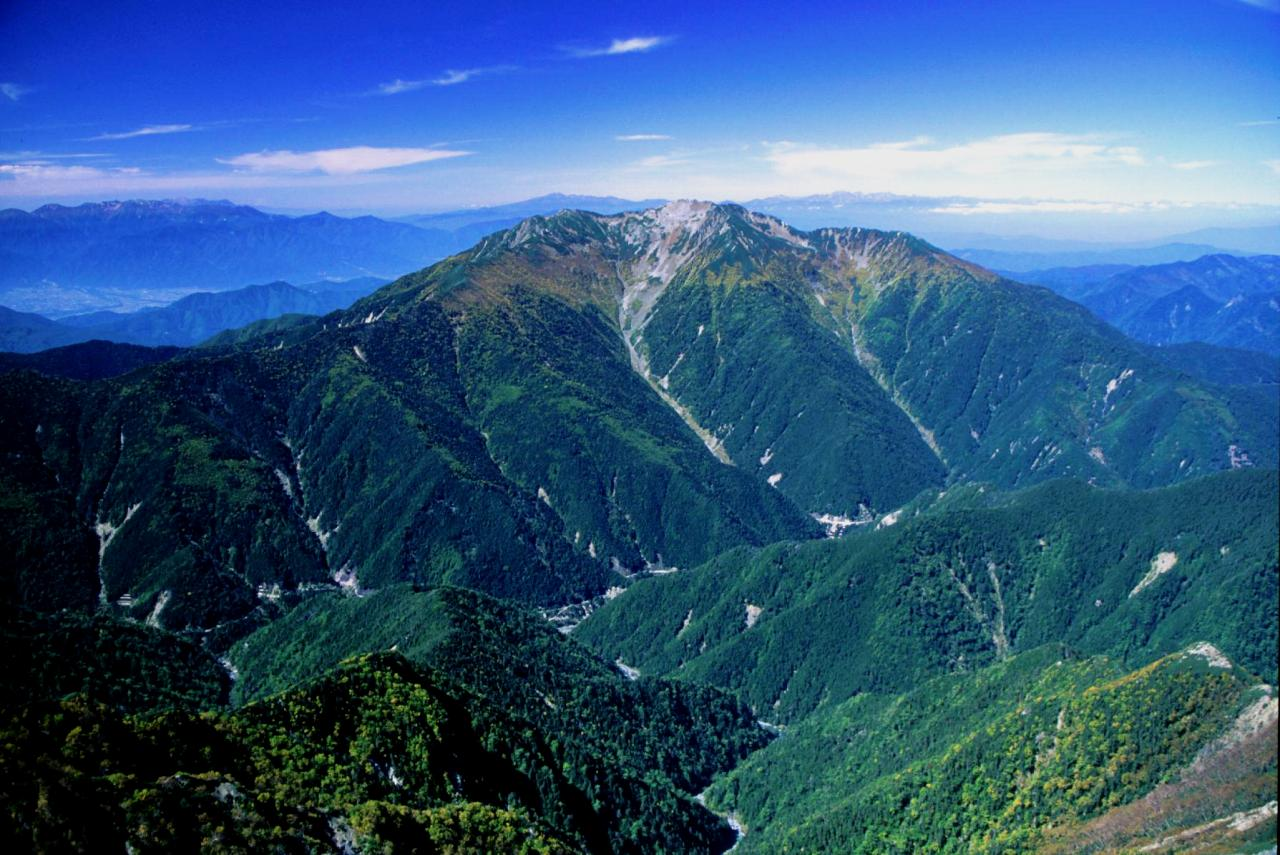
Mount Senjō from Mount Kita

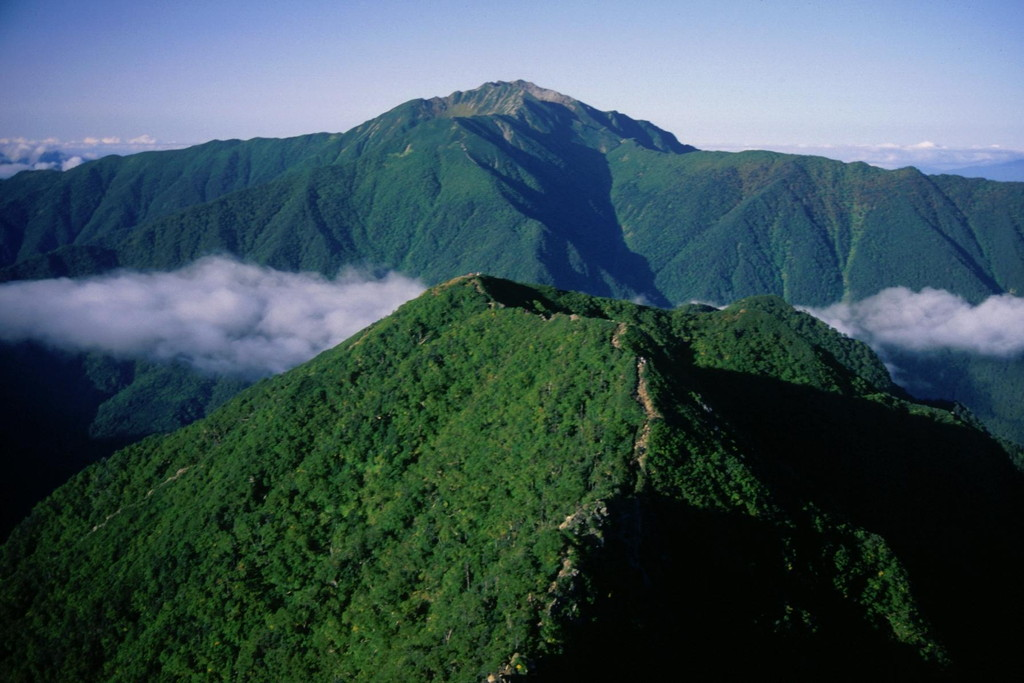
Mount Senjō and Mount Komatsu from Mount Kaikoma

== See also ==
- List of mountains in Japan
- 100 Famous Japanese Mountains
- Three-thousanders (in Japan)
- Akaishi Mountains
- Minami Alps National Park
