= Mount Nokogiri (Akaishi) =

Mountain in the country of Japan

- 鋸岳
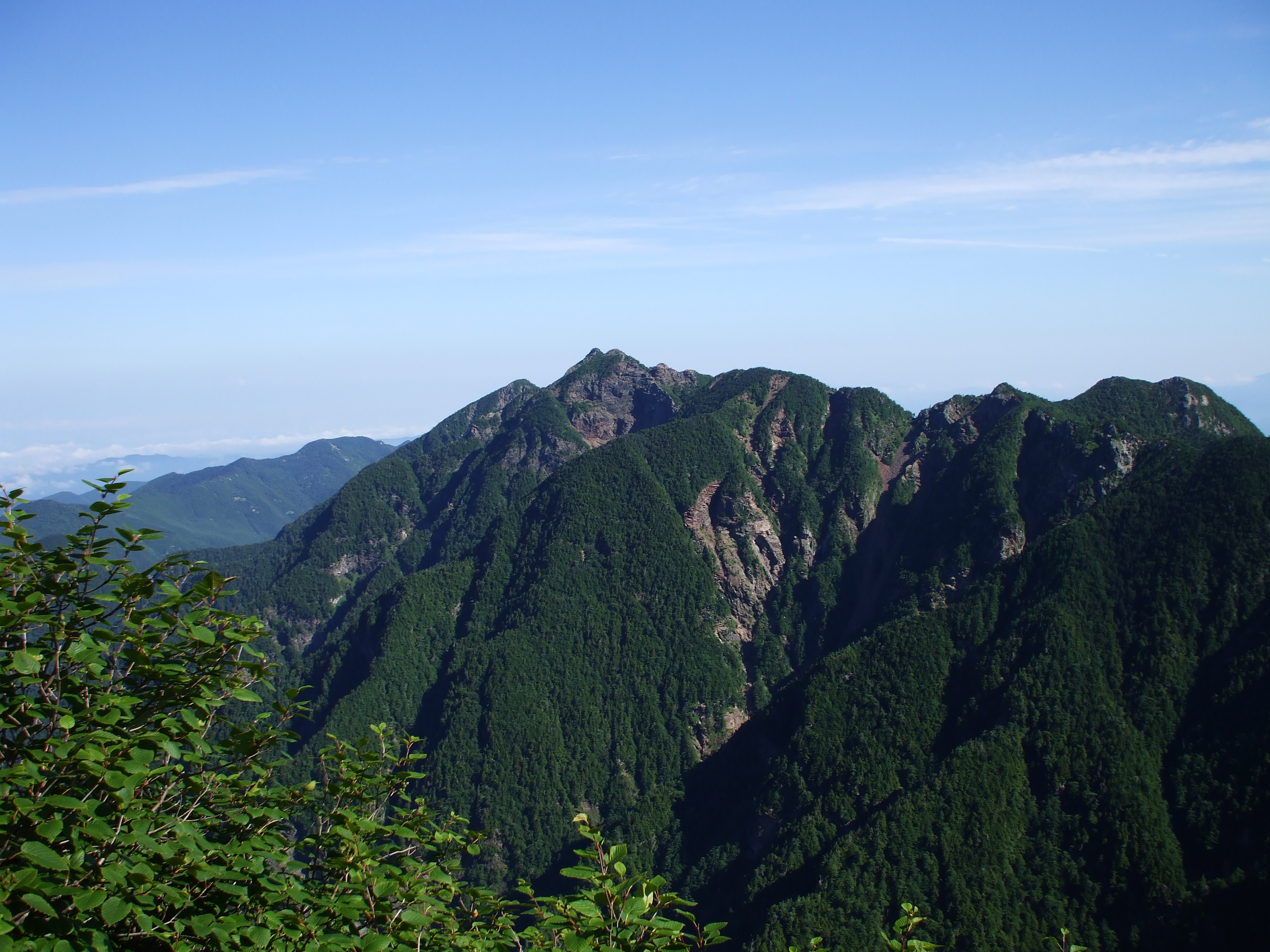
- View of Mount Nokogiri from Mount Kaikoma (August 2008)

Highest point
- Elevation: 2,685 m (8,809 ft)
- Listing: List of mountains and hills of Japan by height
- Coordinates: 35°46′45″N 138°12′36″E

Naming
- English translation: (wood)saw mountain
- Language of name: Japanese

Geography
- Location: Japan
- Parent range: Akaishi Mountains
- Topo map(s): Geographical Survey Institute 25000:1 甲斐駒ヶ岳; 50000:1 甲府

Mount Nokogiri (鋸岳, Nokogiri-dake) is a mountain located in the Akaishi Mountains on the border between, Yamanashi and Nagano Prefectures in Japan.

== Outline ==
This area is in Minami Alps National Park that was established on June 1, 1964. This mountain is also one of the "200 Famous Japanese Mountains". There is no general mountain climbing trail. Therefore, it is difficult to climb it. There is the shelter Mountain hut ("6th Stone-Hut") between this mountain and Mount Kaikoma. The original hut was rebuilt in 2006.

== Geography ==
=== Nearby Mountains ===
It is on the main ridge line in the northern edge of the Akaishi Mountains.

Image	Mountain	Japanese	Height	Distance from the Top	Note
	Mt. Nokogiri	鋸岳	2,685 m (8,809 ft)	0 km (0.0 mi)	200 Famous
	Mt. Kaikoma	甲斐駒ヶ岳	2,967 m (9,734 ft)	3.4 km (2 mi)	100 Famous
	Mt. Senjō	仙丈ヶ岳	3,033 m (9,951 ft)	7.0 km (4.3 mi)	100 Famous

=== River of source ===
Mount Nokogiri is the source of the Fuji River. The Rivers of the source flow to the Pacific Ocean.

- Fuji River
- Todai River (Tributary of Tenryū River)

== Gallery ==
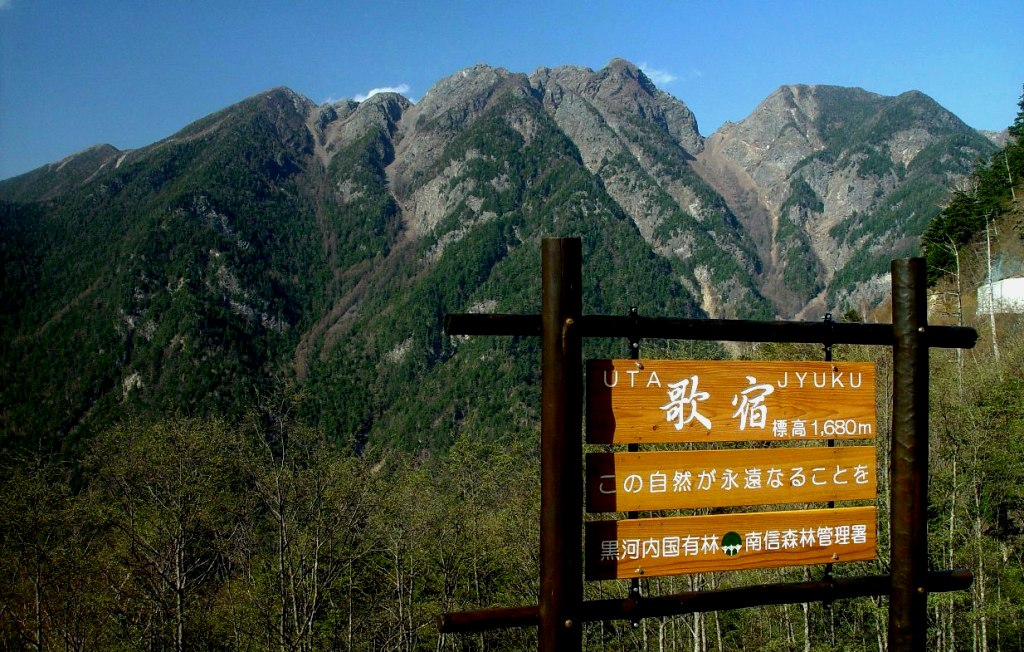
Mount Nokogiri from Utajuku

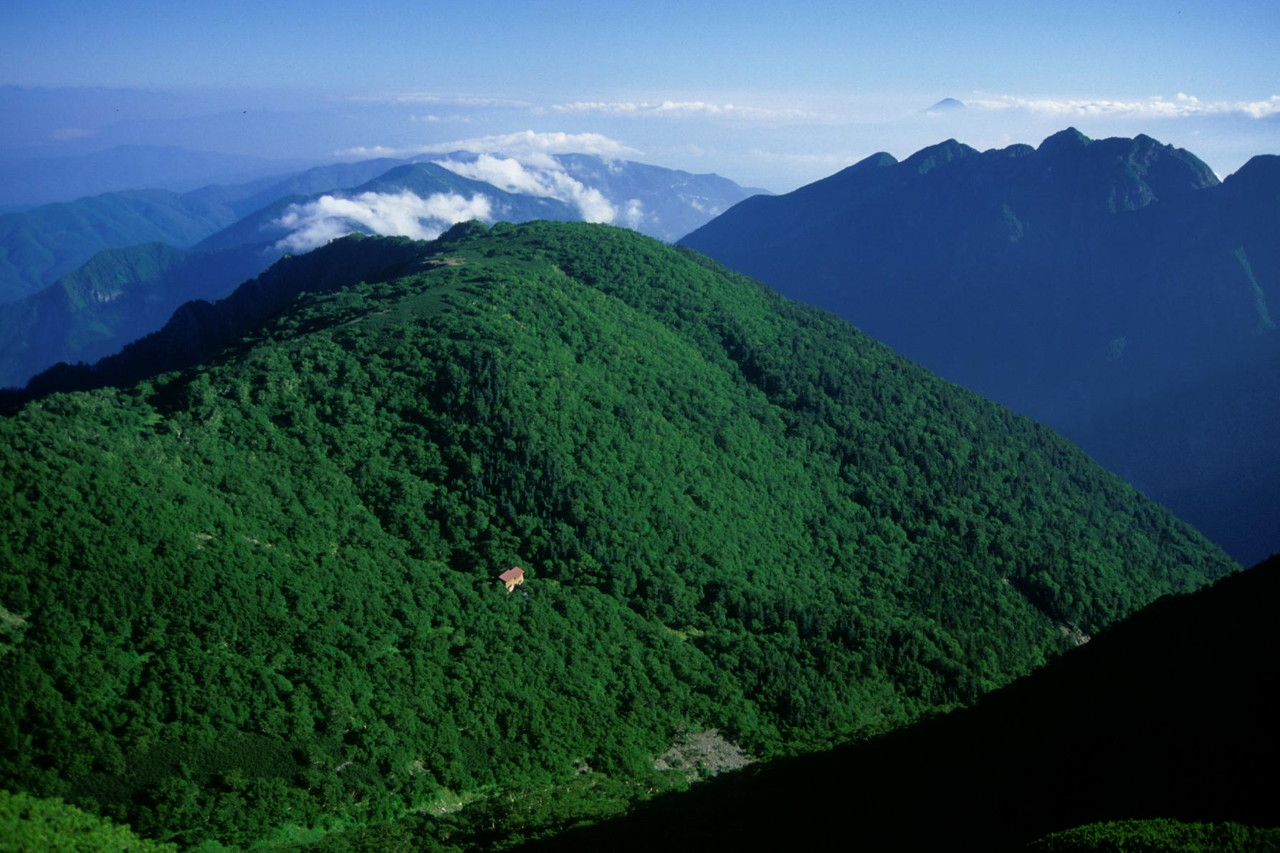
Mount Nokogiri and Uma-no-Se from Mount Ko-Senjō

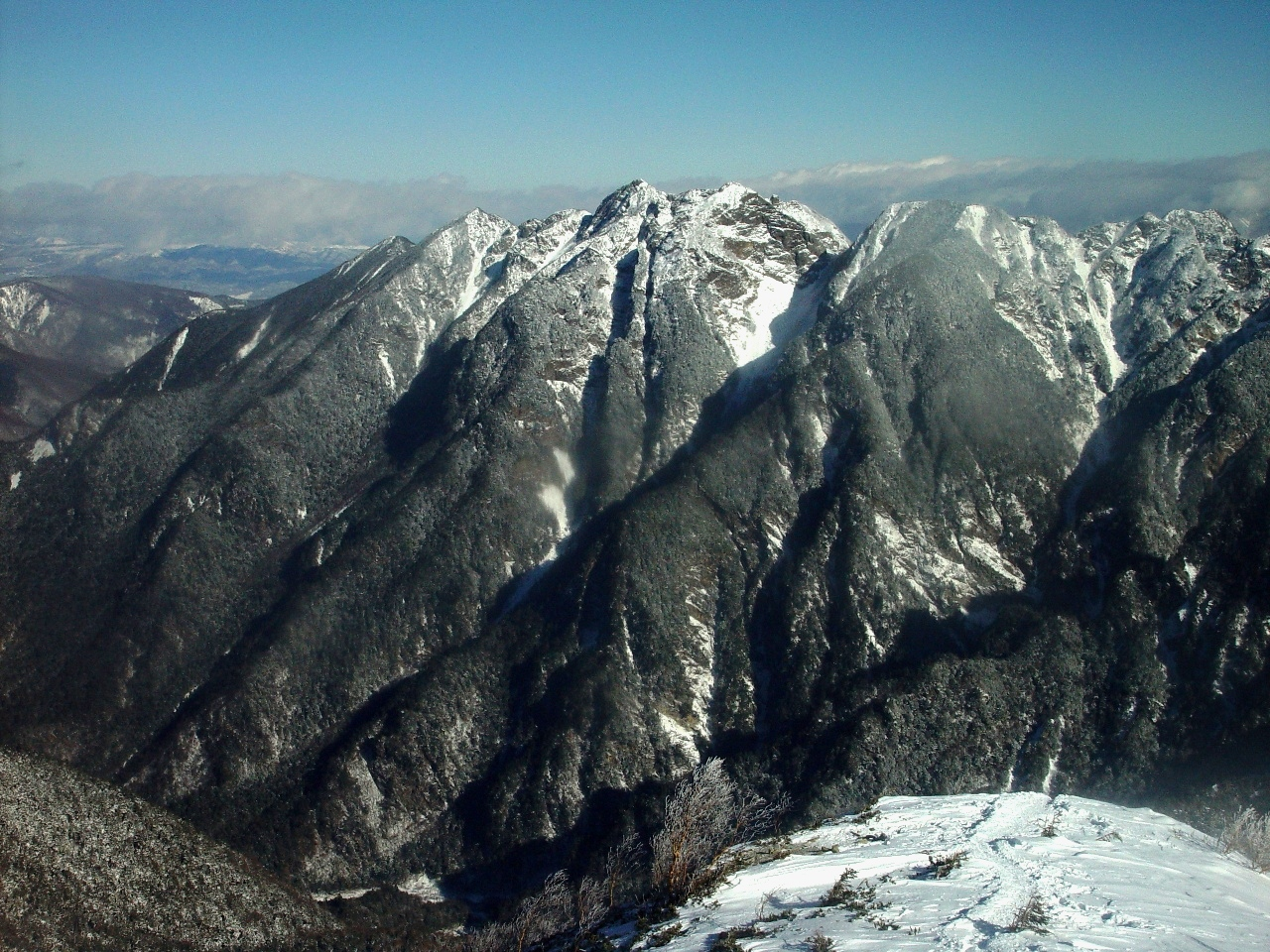
Mount Nokogiri from Mount Ko-Senjō

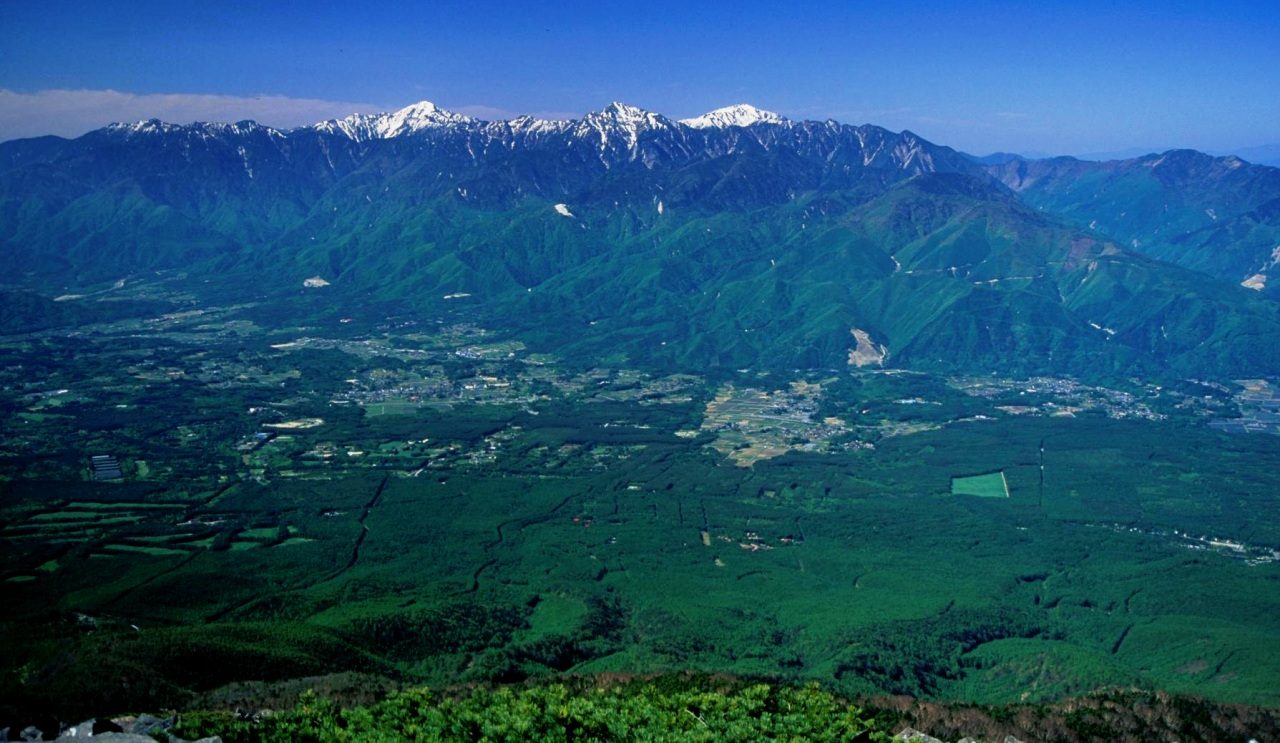
Mount Kita, Mount Kaikoma and Mount Nokogiri from Yatsugatake

== See also ==
- Akaishi Mountains
- Minami Alps National Park
