= Mount Tekari =

Mountain in the country of Japan

- 光岳
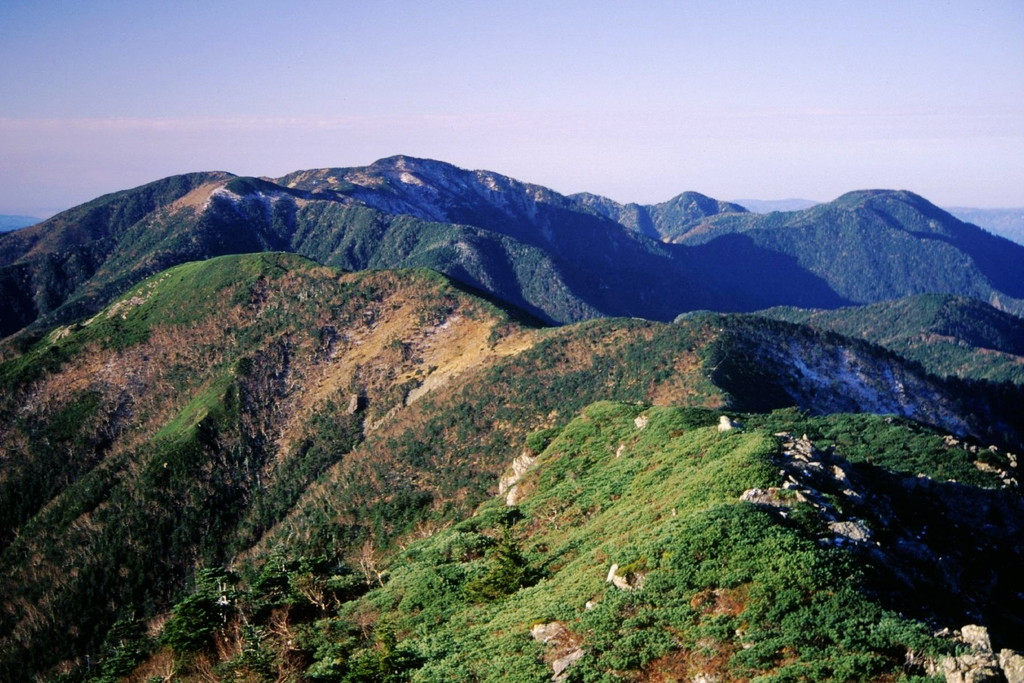
- Mount Tekari from Mount Chausu

Highest point
- Elevation: 2,591 m (8,501 ft)
- Listing: List of mountains and hills of Japan by height 100 Famous Japanese Mountains
- Coordinates: 35°20′17″N 138°05′02″E

Geography
- Location within Japan
- Location: Shizuoka Prefecture; Nagano Prefecture, Japan
- Parent range: Akaishi Mountains

Mount Tekari (光岳, Tekari-dake) is part of the Akaishi Mountains on the border of Shizuoka and Nagano prefectures in Japan. It is the southernmost mountain in the Akaishi Mountains and the southernmost mountain over 2,500 metres (8,202 ft) in Japan.

== Outline ==
The mountain's peak just exceeds the tree line, and Siberian Dwarf Pines and other alpine plants can be found on its southern face. This mountain is the southernmost point at which Siberian Dwarf Pines can be found throughout the world.
