= Komagatake =

Komagatake (駒ヶ岳, "colt peak") may refer to one of several mountains in Japan:

- Mount Akagi (Akagi Komagatake) a mountain in Gunma prefecture
- Mount Echigo-Komagatake (Echigo Komagatake), also named Uonuma Komagatake, a mountain in Niigata prefecture
- Hokkaidō Komagatake, an active volcano in Hokkaidō
- Mount Kaikoma (Kai Komagatake), a mountain in the Akaishi Mountains on the border of Yamanashi prefecture and Nagano prefecture
- Mount Kisokoma (Kiso Komagatake), a mountain in the Central Alps of Nagano prefecture
- Mount Koma (Hakone), a peak (Hakone Komagatake) of Mount Hakone in Kanagawa Prefecture
- Komagatake (Iwate Prefecture), site of the Komagata Shrine

Komagatake may also refer to:

- Komagatake Kuniriki (born 1880), Japanese sumo wrestler from Wakuya, Miyagi Prefecture
