= Akaishi Mountains =

Mountain range in the southern part of the Japanese alps

- Southern Alps (南アルプス)
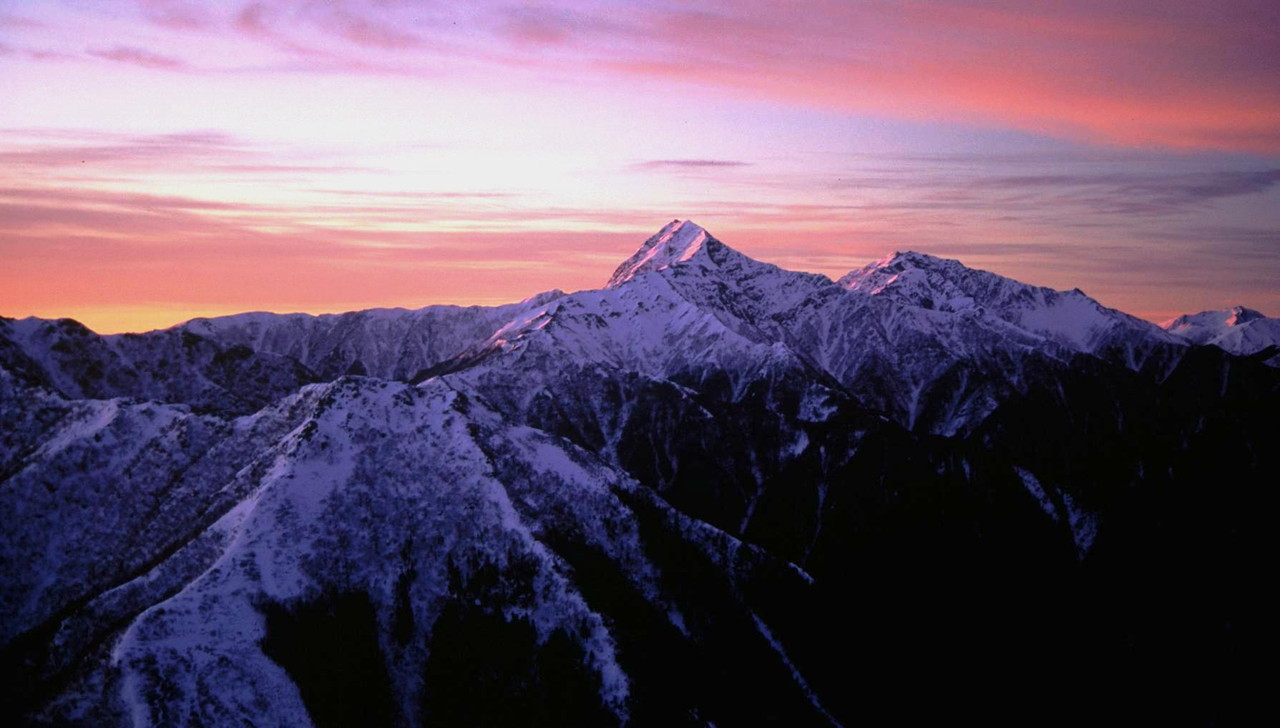
- Akaishi Mountains (Mount Kita and Mount Aino) from Mount Komatsu

Highest point
- Peak: Mount Kita
- Elevation: 3,193 m (10,476 ft)
- Coordinates: 35°40′27″N 138°14′12″E

Dimensions
- Length: 120 km (75 mi)
- Width: 40 km (25 mi)

Naming
- Native name: 赤石山脈 (Japanese)

Geography
- Location within Japan
- Location: Honshu
- Country: Japan
- Prefectures: Nagano; Yamanashi; Shizuoka
- Range coordinates: 35°34′N 138°11′E
- Parent range: Japanese Alps

The Akaishi Mountains (赤石山脈, Akaishi Sanmyaku) are a mountain range in central Honshū, Japan, bordering Nagano, Yamanashi and Shizuoka prefectures. They are also called the Southern Alps (南アルプス, Minami Arupusu), as they join with the Hida Mountains ("Northern Alps") and the Kiso Mountains ("Central Alps") to form the Japanese Alps.

== Origin of the name ==
There are a lot of red stones (赤石 Aka-Ishi) around the Akaishi River, a tributary of the Ōi River in the southern part of Southern Alps. Then it was said that the mountain of red stone came to be called Mount Akaishi. The mountain represents the mountain range and the name Akaishi is used for the whole range mountain range, Akaishi Mountains.

== Major peaks ==
Almost all major peaks of the Akaishi Mountains are in Minami Alps National Park that was established on June 1, 1964. The range is the source of two rivers, Ōi River and Tenryū River, which flow to the Pacific Ocean.

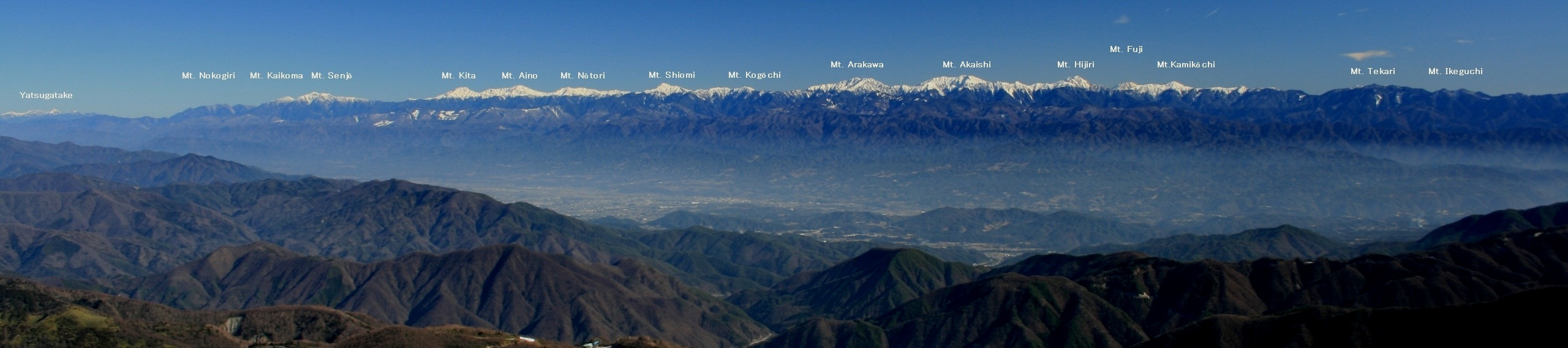
Scenery of Akaishi Mountains seen from Mount Ena in early winter

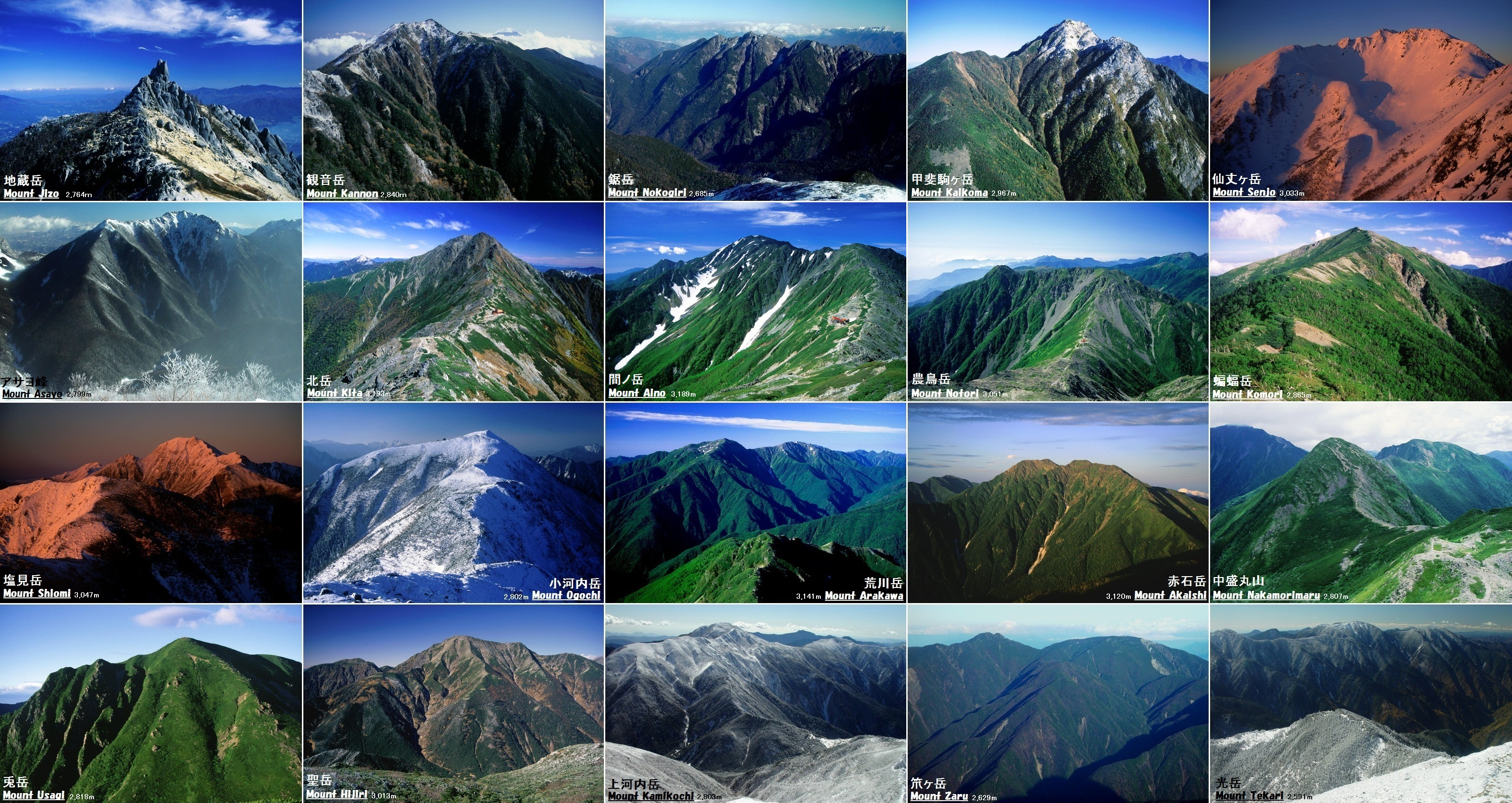
Major Peaks of Akaishi Mountains

| Image | Mountain | Height | Note |
|---|---|---|---|
| | Mt. Hō'ō | 2,840 m (9,318 ft) | 100 Famous |
| | Mt. Nokogiri | 2,685 m (8,809 ft) | 200 Famous |
| | Mt. Kaikoma | 2,967 m (9,734 ft) | 100 Famous |
| | Mt. Senjō | 3,033 m (9,951 ft) | 100 Famous |
| | Mt. Kita | 3,193 m (10,476 ft) | the highest mountain in Akaishi Mountains; 100 Famous |
| | Mt. Aino | 3,190 m (10,466 ft) | 100 Famous |
| | Mt. Nōtori | 3,026 m (9,928 ft) | 200 Famous |
| | Mt. Shiomi | 3,047 m (9,997 ft) | 100 Famous |
| | Mt. Warusawa | 3,141 m (10,305 ft) | 100 Famous |
| | Mt. Akaishi | 3,120 m (10,236 ft) | 100 Famous |
| | Mt. Hijiri | 3,013 m (9,885 ft) | 100 Famous |
| | Mt. Tekari | 2,591 m (8,501 ft) | 100 Famous |

== Panorama ==
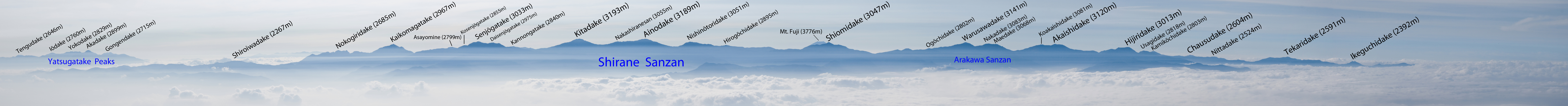
Yatsugatake and Akaishi Mountains from Mt.Utsugidake.

== Flora and fauna ==
Alpine plants, such as Siberian dwarf pine can be seen above the tree line. Rock ptarmigan and spotted nutcracker also live in the alpine zone. Japanese serow and sika deer live in the forest belt on the mountain slopes. Callianthemum hondoense (北岳草, Kitadake-sō) is endemic to Mount Kita.

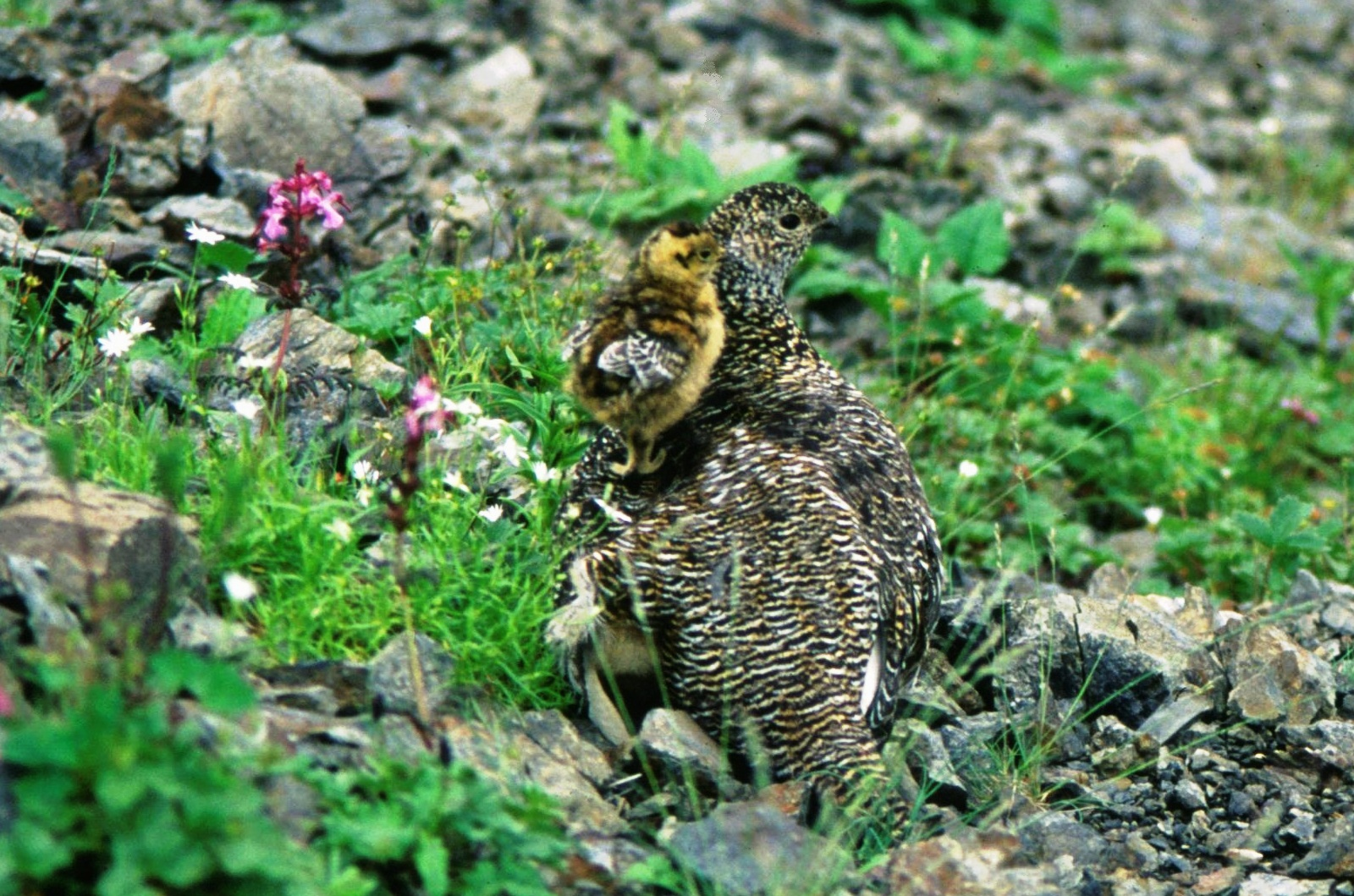
Rock ptarmigan

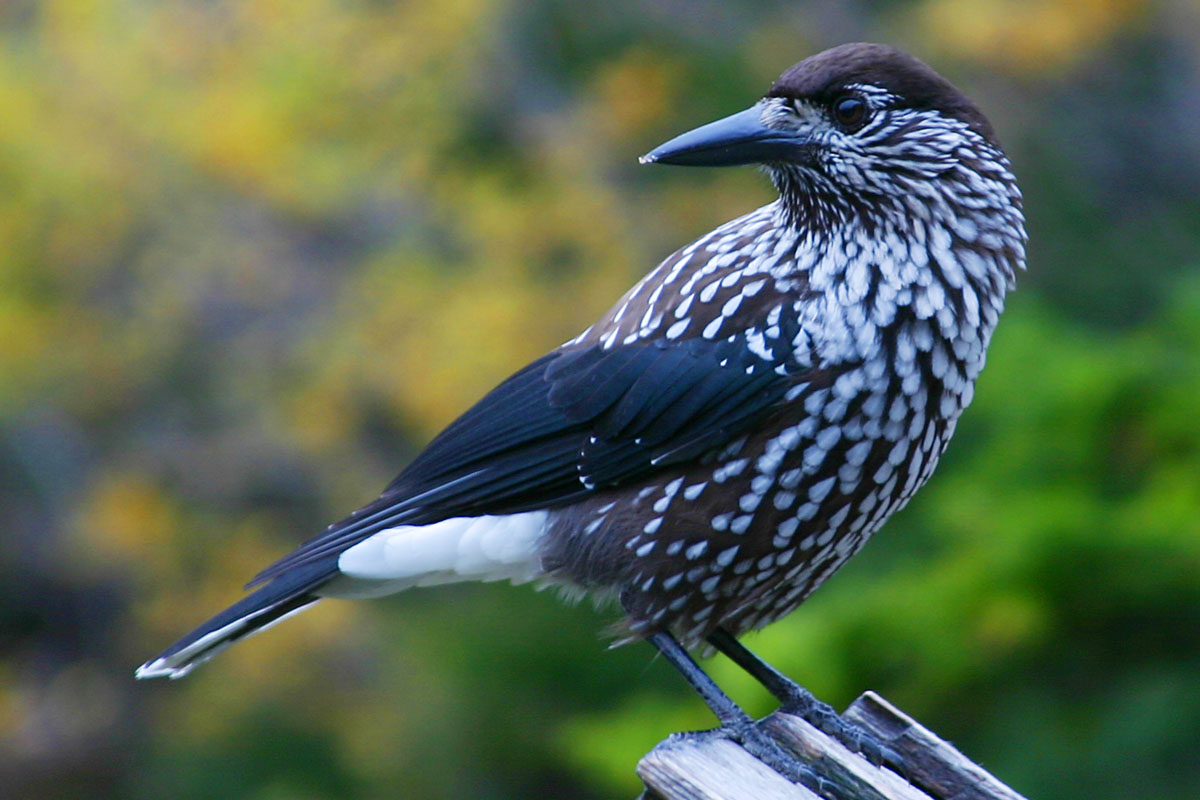
Spotted
nutcracker

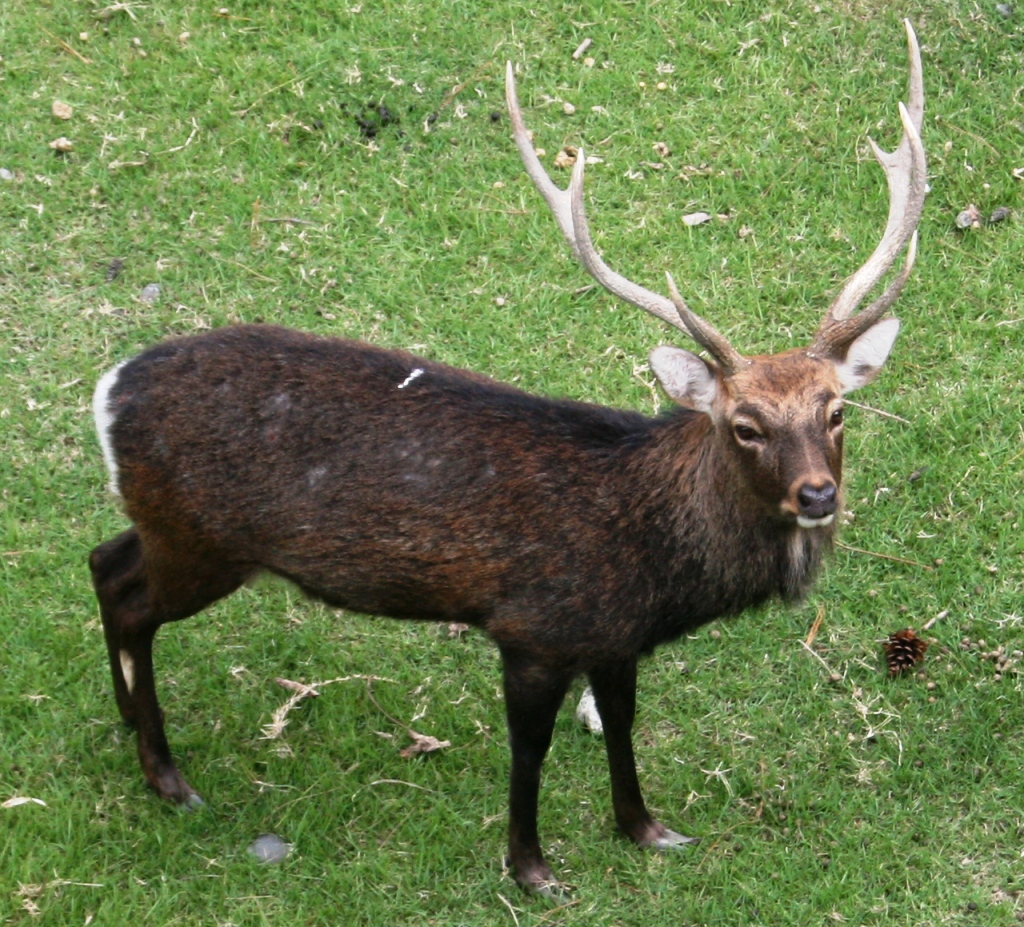
Sika deer

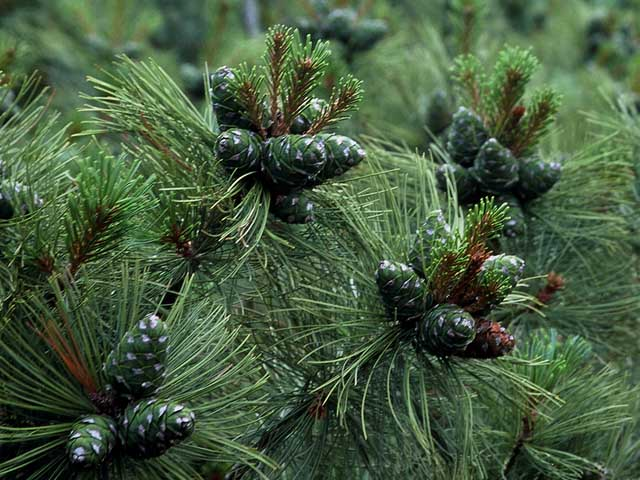
Siberian
dwarf pine

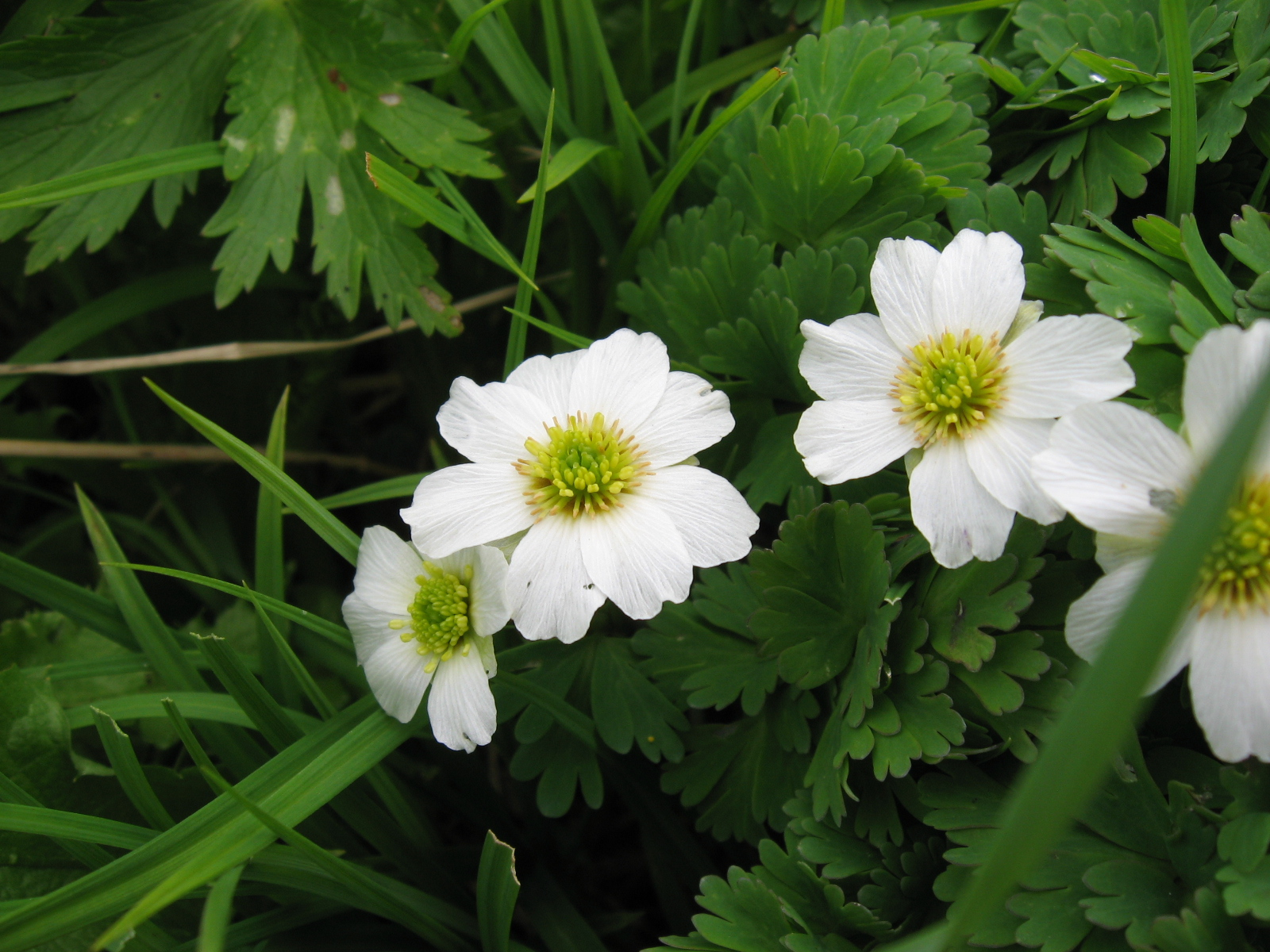
Callianthemum
hondoense

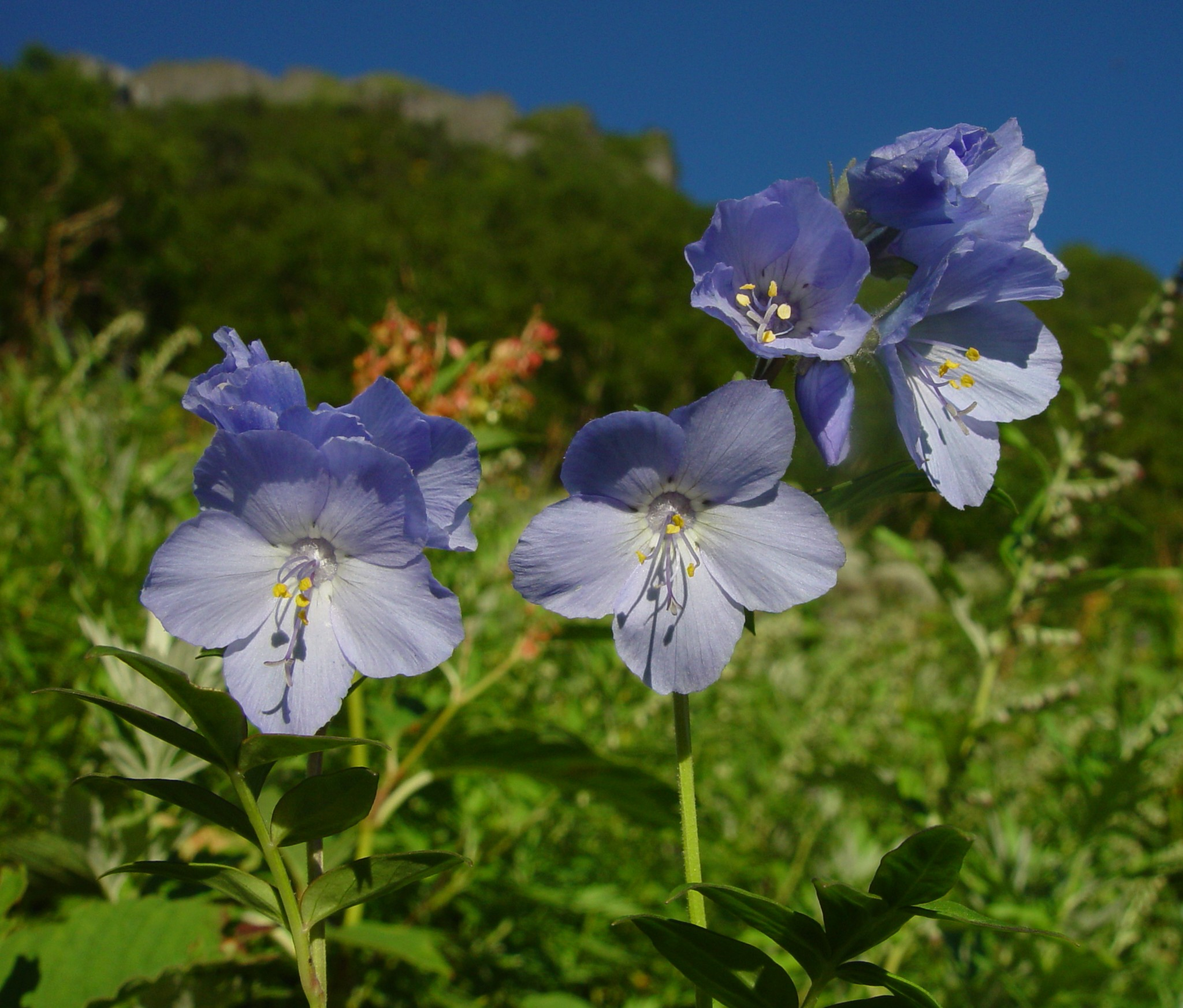
Polemonium
caeruleum

== Walter Weston in the Japanese Alps ==
Englishman Walter Weston introduced the Western world to the Japanese Alps in his book Mountaineering and Exploring in the Japanese Alps. During his visits to Japan, he climbed Akaishi Mountains. Several monuments in his memory have been set up in several places in the Japanese Alps.

He climbed the following peaks:

- 1892 Mount Akaishi - The first non-Japanese to climb this mountain
- 1902 Mount Kita
- 1903 Mount Kaikoma
- 1904 Mount Hōō and Mount Senjō

== See also ==
- Japanese Alps
  - Hida Mountains (Northern Alps)
  - Kiso Mountains (Central Alps)
- Minami Alps National Park
- Minami-Alps Biosphere Reserve
- 100 Famous Japanese Mountains
- Walter Weston

== Books ==
- Mountaineering and Exploring in the Japanese Alps -by Walter Weston (1896)
