= Fuji River =

Coordinates: 35°06′56″N 138°38′28″E

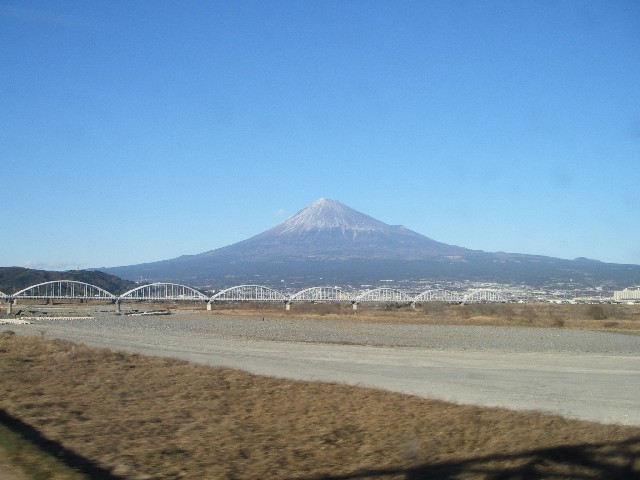
- Mt. Fuji and a bridge over the Fuji River

- Location within Japan
- Native name: 富士川 (Japanese)

Location
- Country: Japan

Physical characteristics
- Source
  - location: Ichikawamisato, Yamanashi Prefecture
  - elevation: 2,685 m (8,809 ft)
- Mouth
  - location: Suruga Bay
  - elevation: 0 m (0 ft)
- Length: 128 km (80 mi)
- Basin size: 3,990 km^{2} (1,540 sq mi)
- Discharge
  - average: 63.2 m^{3}/s (2,230 cu ft/s)

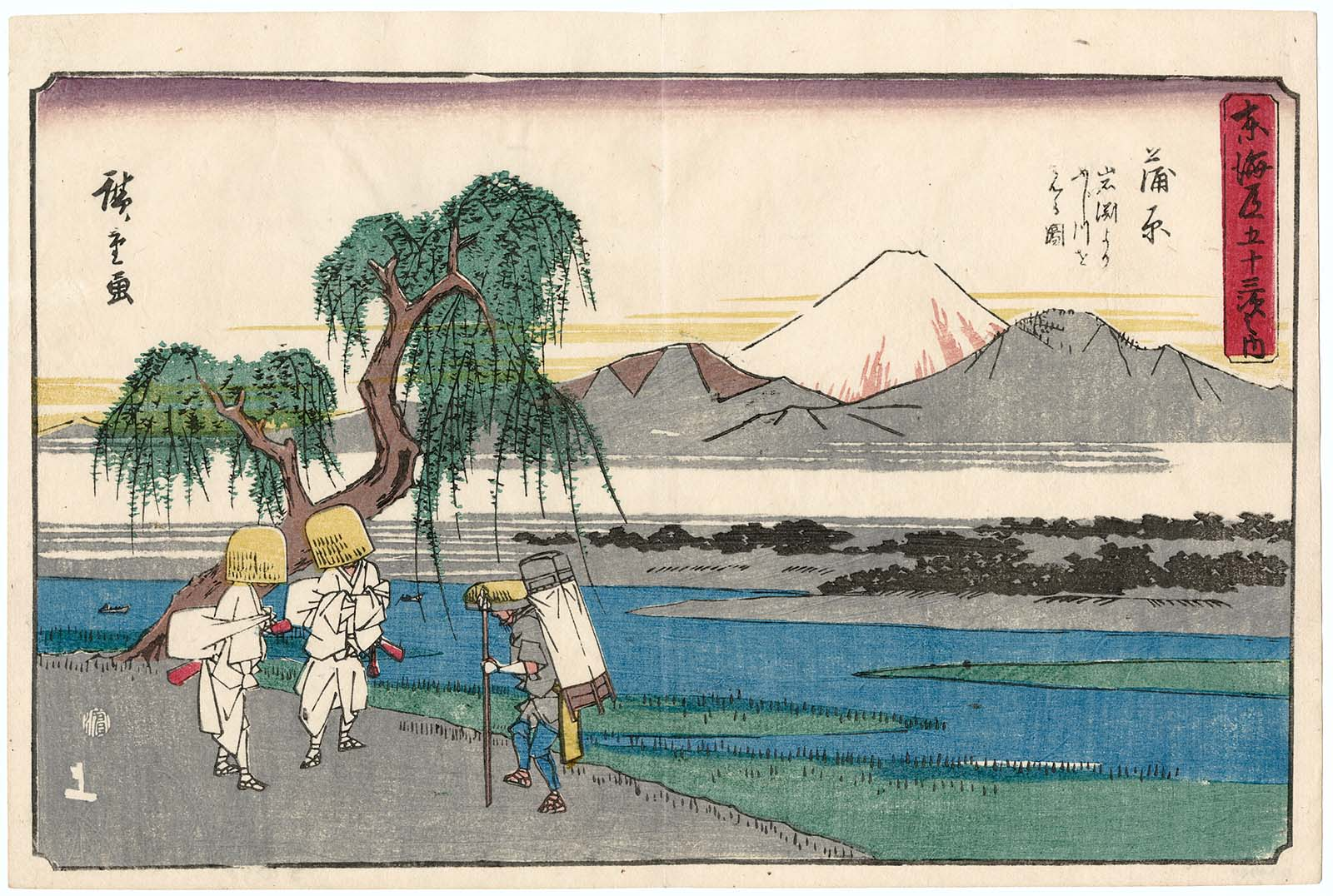
Hiroshige

The Fuji River (富士川, Fuji-kawa or Fuji-gawa) is a Class A river in Yamanashi and Shizuoka Prefectures of central Japan. It is 128 kilometres (80 mi) long and has a watershed of 3,990 square kilometres (1,540 sq mi). Along with the Mogami River in Yamagata and the Kuma River in Kumamoto, it is regarded as having one of the three most rapid flows of Japan.

The river arises from Mount Nokogiri in the Akaishi Mountains in northwest Yamanashi as the Kamanashi River (釜無川, Kamanashi-gawa), and meets the Fuefuki River at the town of Ichikawamisato where it changes its name to the Fuji River. It then flows around the west foot of Mount Fuji and into Suruga Bay at its mouth in the city of Fuji.

The banks of the Fuji River was the location of the Battle of Fujikawa in 1180, one of the most important early battles of the Genpei War. The Sengoku period warlord Takeda Shingen built extensive dikes along the Kamanashi portion of the river, which allowed water to flood buffer zones to control damage. These dikes still exist, and are called the Shingen-zutsumi (信玄堤). Flood control efforts continued under the Tokugawa shogunate of the Edo period, when extensive dikes were completed in 1674 after 50 years of construction, to divert the lower river away from populated areas, which were prone to flooding.

Water transportation up the river from Suruga Bay to inland Kai Province prospered in the Edo period and early Meiji period, until the opening of the Tōkaidō Main Line, Chūō Main Line and Fuji Minobu Railway railways. Commercial river transport ceased in 1923.

There are numerous dams for hydroelectric power generation and flood control along the various tributaries in the upper reaches of the river. The Fuji River also marks the divide of Japan's electrical grid, with the utility frequency of 50 hertz to the east, and 60 hertz to the west.

The image of a Tōkaidō Shinkansen train crossing the Fuji river with Mount Fuji in the background is a recognized depiction of Japan.
