= Mount Nōtori =

Mountain in the Akashi mountains of Japan

- 農鳥岳
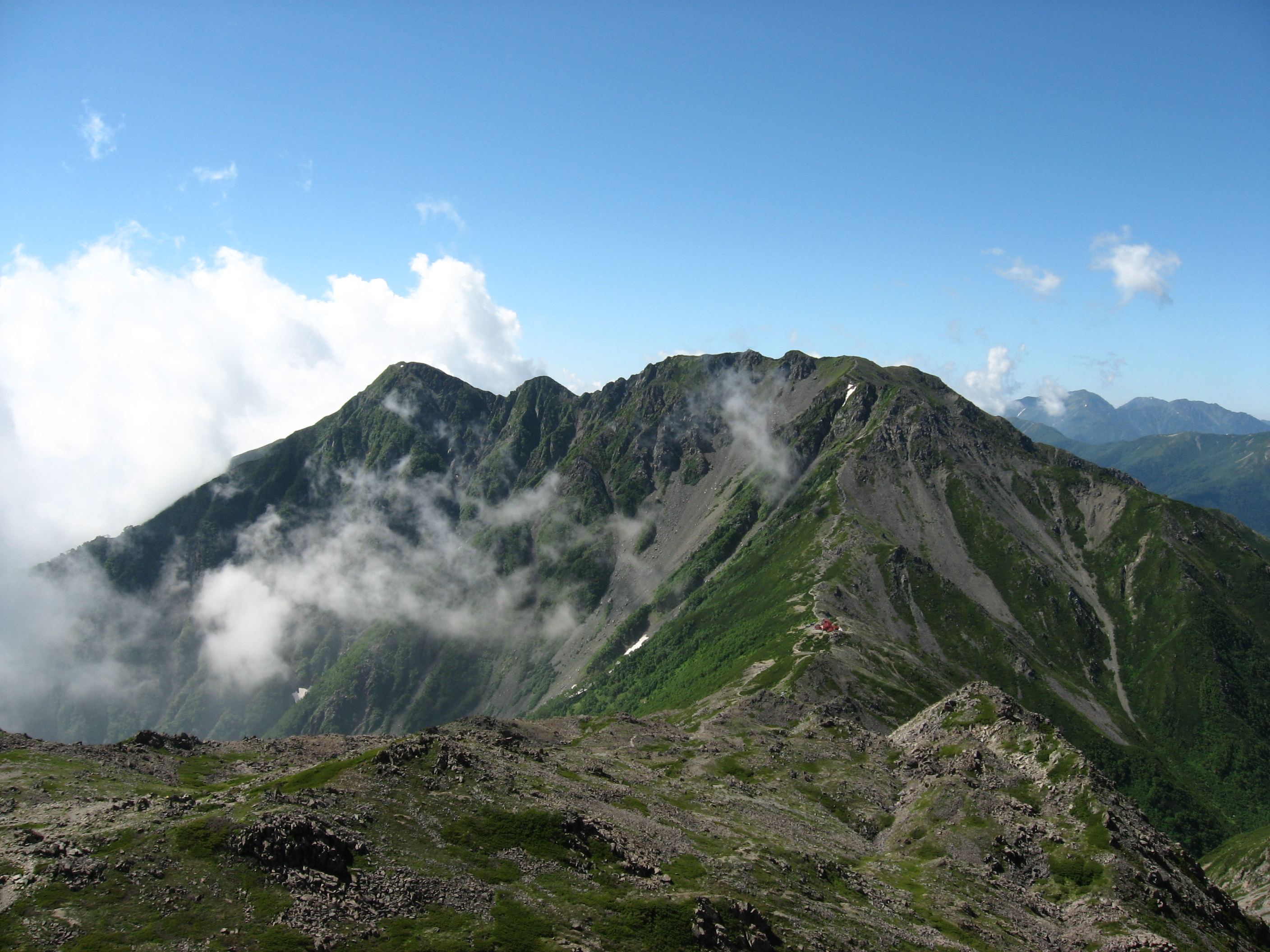
- Mount Nōtori from Mount Aino

Highest point
- Elevation: 3,026 m (9,928 ft)
- Listing: 200 Famous Japanese Mountains
- Coordinates: 35°37′16″N 138°14′13″E

Naming
- Language of name: Japanese
- Pronunciation: [noːtoɾidake]

Geography
- Location within Japan
- Location: Chūbu region, Honshū, Japan
- Parent range: Akaishi Mountains

Climbing
- Easiest route: Hike

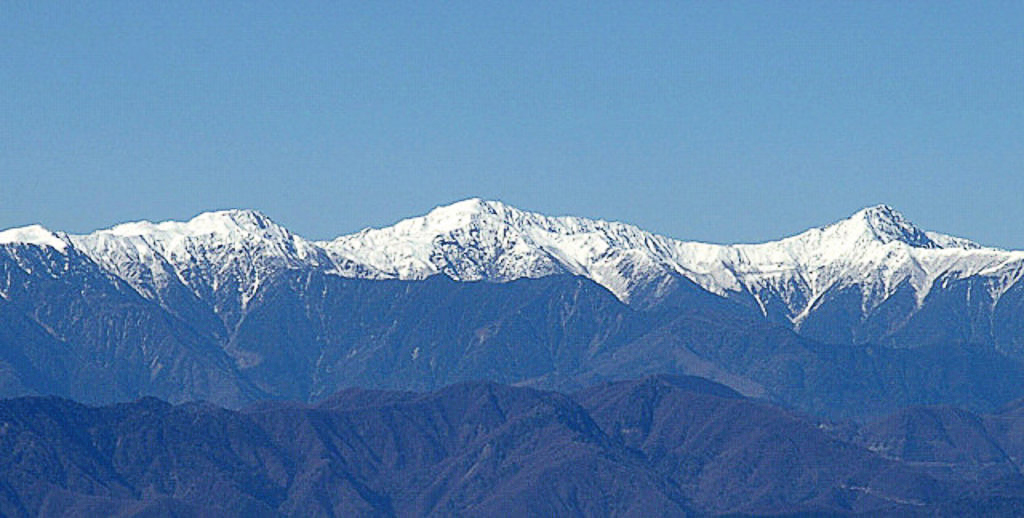
Shiranesanzan (from left to right: Mount Nōtori, Mount Aino, Mount Kita), view from Mount Kenashi in Shizuoka Prefecture (November 2006)

Mount Nōtori (農鳥岳, Nōtori-dake), or Nōtoridake, is one of the major peaks in the northern Akaishi Mountains, along with Mount Kita and Mount Aino. The 3,026 m (9,928 ft) peak lies to the south of the other mountains, spanning the town of Hayakawa in Yamanashi Prefecture and Aoi-ku in the city of Shizuoka, Shizuoka Prefecture, Japan.

== Geography ==
The top of the mountain is divided into two peaks. The southeastern peak, known as Mount Nōtori, is 3,026 m (9,928 ft), while the northwestern peak, known as Mount Nishinōtori (西農鳥岳, Nishinōtori-dake), is 3,051 m (10,010 ft). It is located in the Minami Alps National Park.

The main mountains of the northern Akaishi Mountains are Mount Kitadake, Mount Aino and Mount Nōtori. The three mountains together are called "Shiranesanzan" (白根三山, Shiranesanzan), which means "three white summits".

== Mountain huts ==
The major mountain huts on the mountain are the Nōtori Huts (農鳥小屋, Nōtori Goya) at the base of Mount Nishinōtori. Slightly further down the mountain are the Daimonzawa Huts (大門沢小屋, Daimonzawa Goya).

== Gallery ==
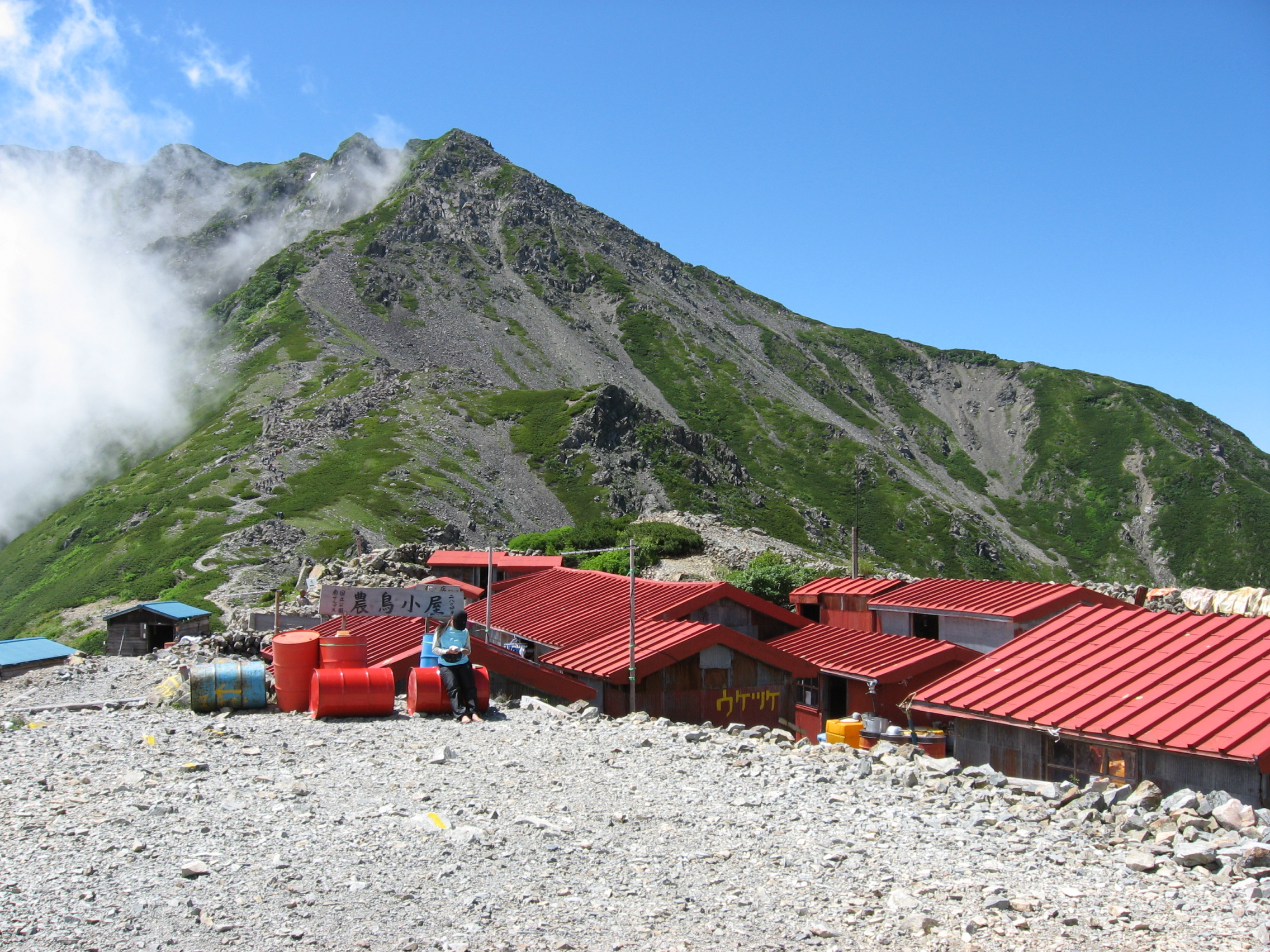
Nōtori Huts at the base of Mount Nishinōtori

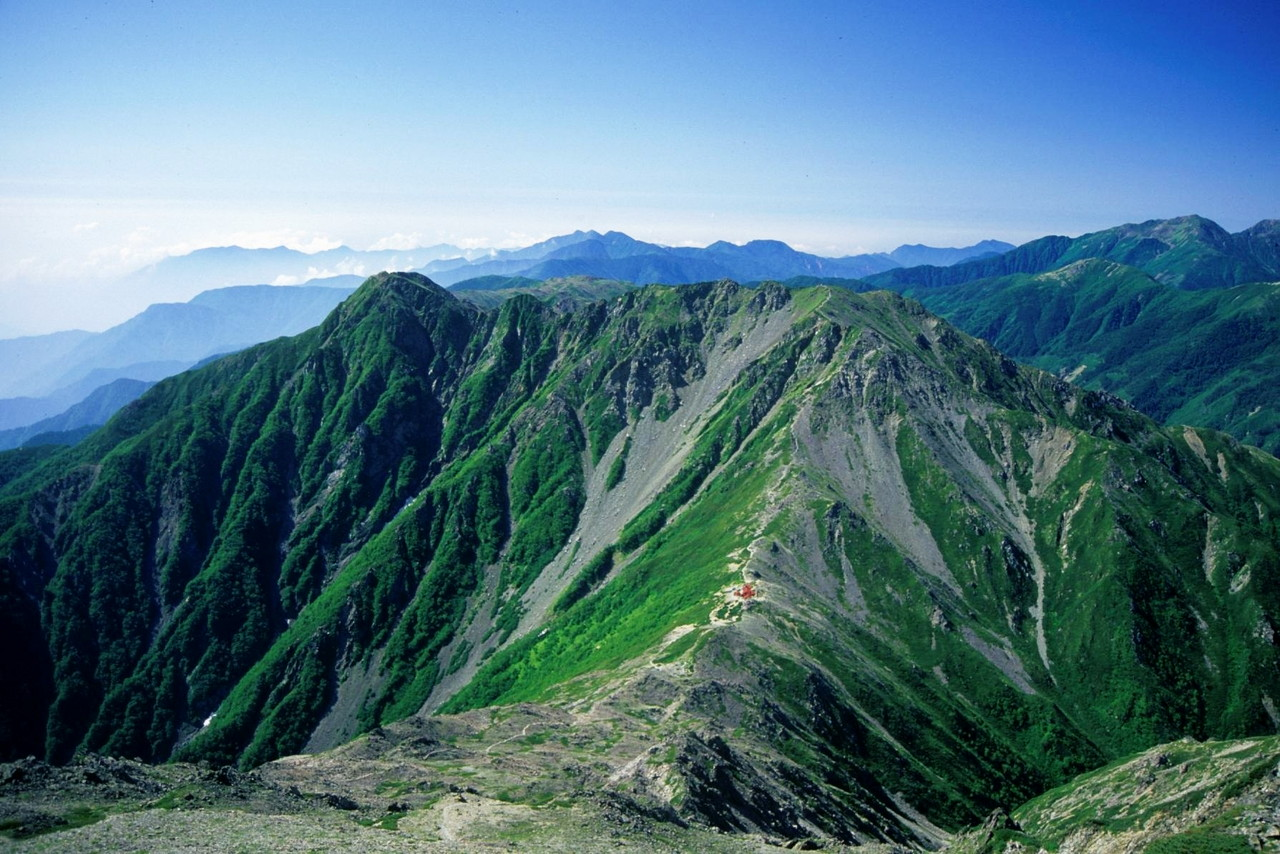
Mount Nōtori seen from Mount Aino

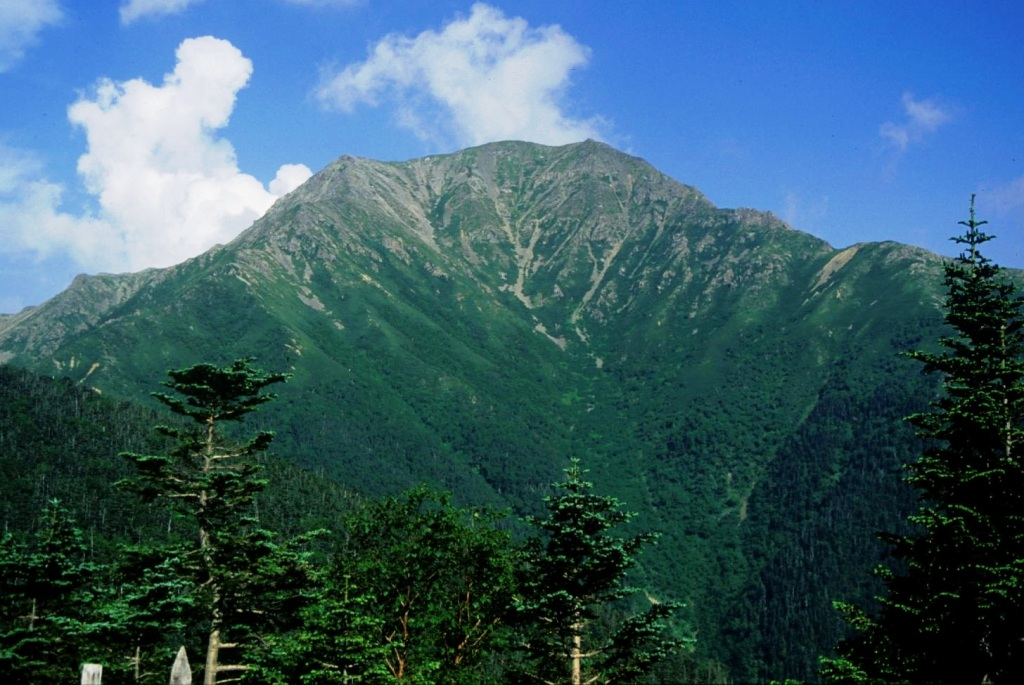
Mount Nishinōtori seen from Kumanodaira

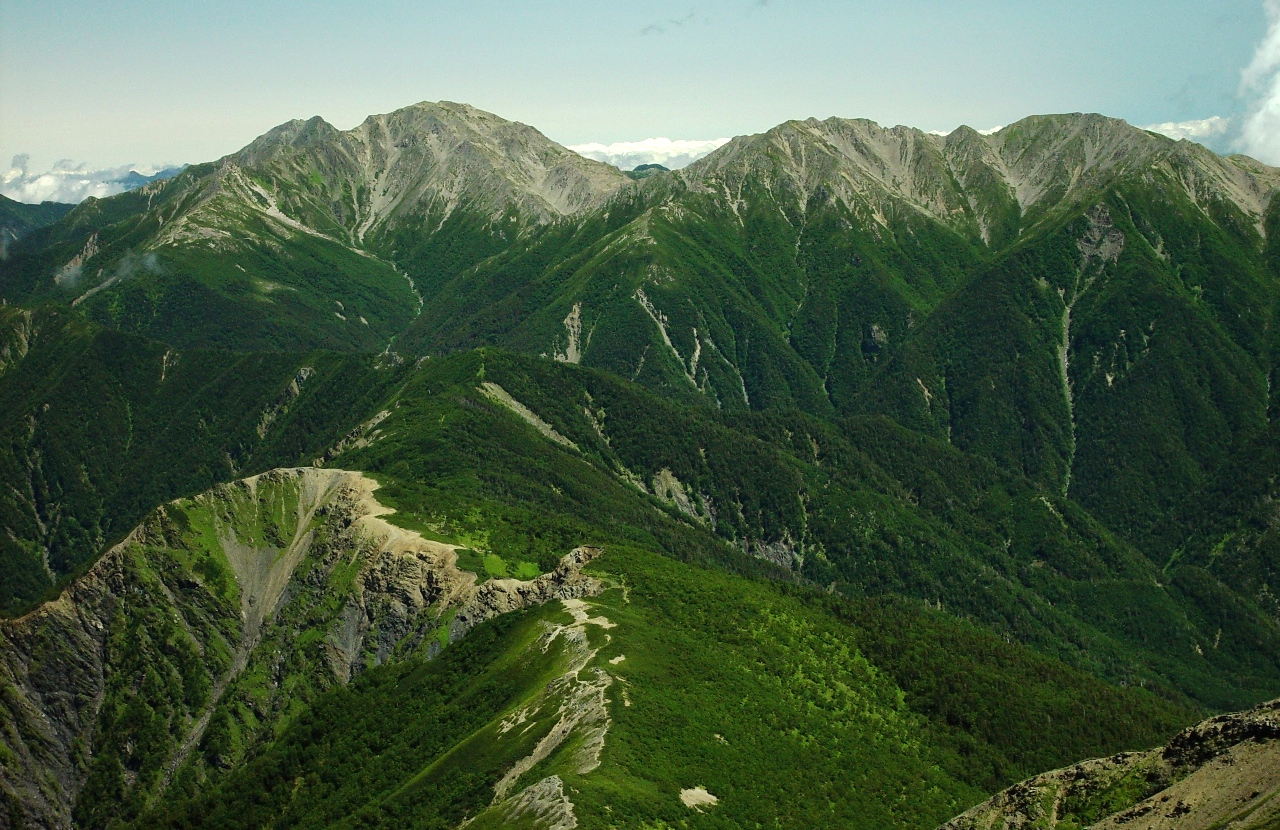
Mount Aino and Mount Nōtori seen from Mount Shiomi

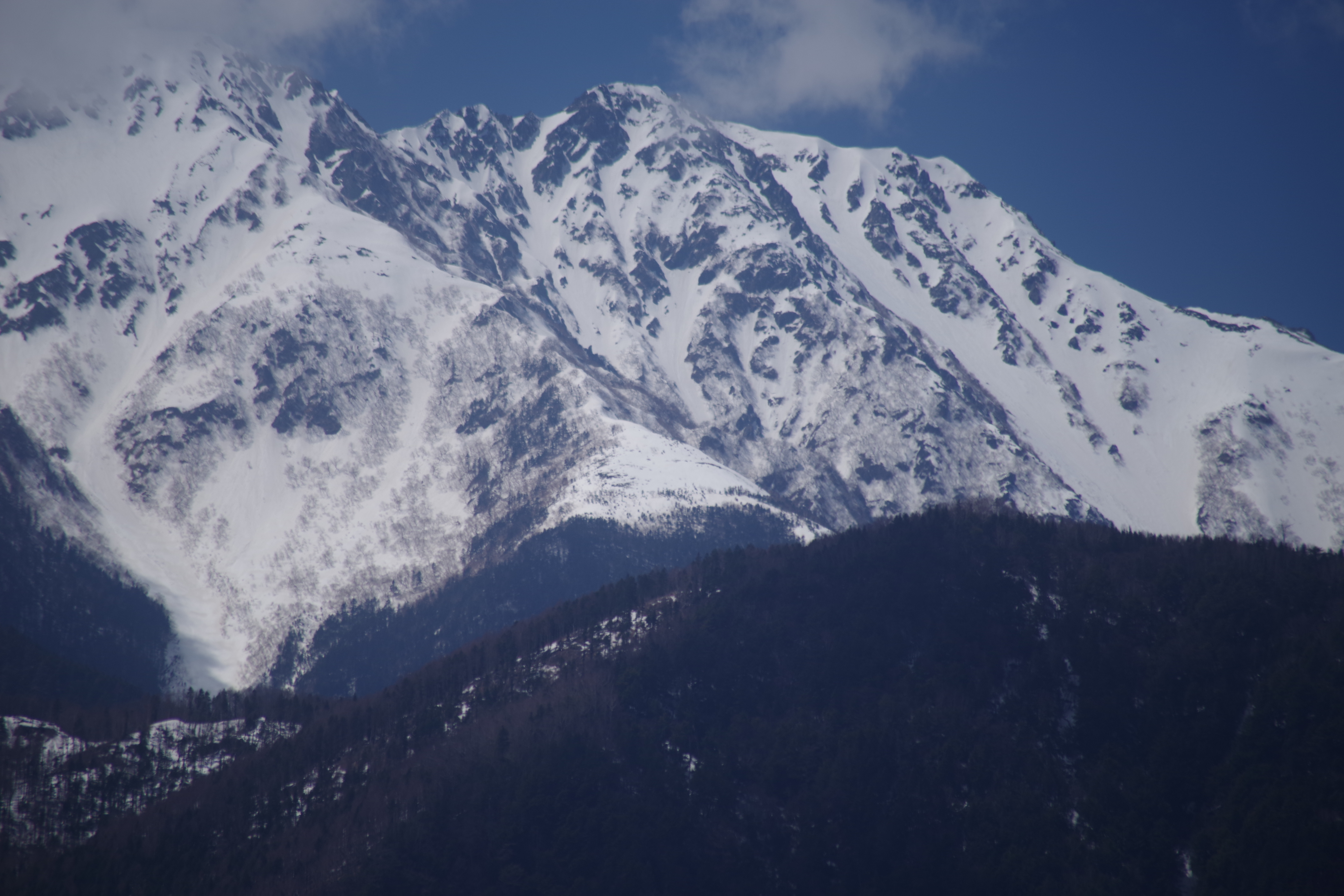
Mount Notori from Yashajin Pass

== See also ==
- List of mountains in Japan
- Three-thousanders (in Japan)
- Akaishi Mountains
- Minami Alps National Park
