= List of lava domes =

Lava domes are common features on volcanoes around the world. Lava domes are volcanoes to exist on plate margins as well as in intra-arc hotspots, and on heights above 6000 m and in the sea floor. Individual lava domes and volcanoes featuring lava domes are listed below.

== Africa ==
=== Ethiopia ===
- Borawli, Afar Region

the mount Ammar

== Asia ==
=== Afghanistan ===
Dome or volcano name	Volcanic area	Composition	Last dome eruption or growth episode
Dacht-i-Navar Group	Ghanzi region		
Vakak Group	Ghanzi region		

=== Armenia ===
- Geghama mountains

=== Indonesia ===
- Wayang-Windu, Java
- Ranakah, Flores

=== Japan ===
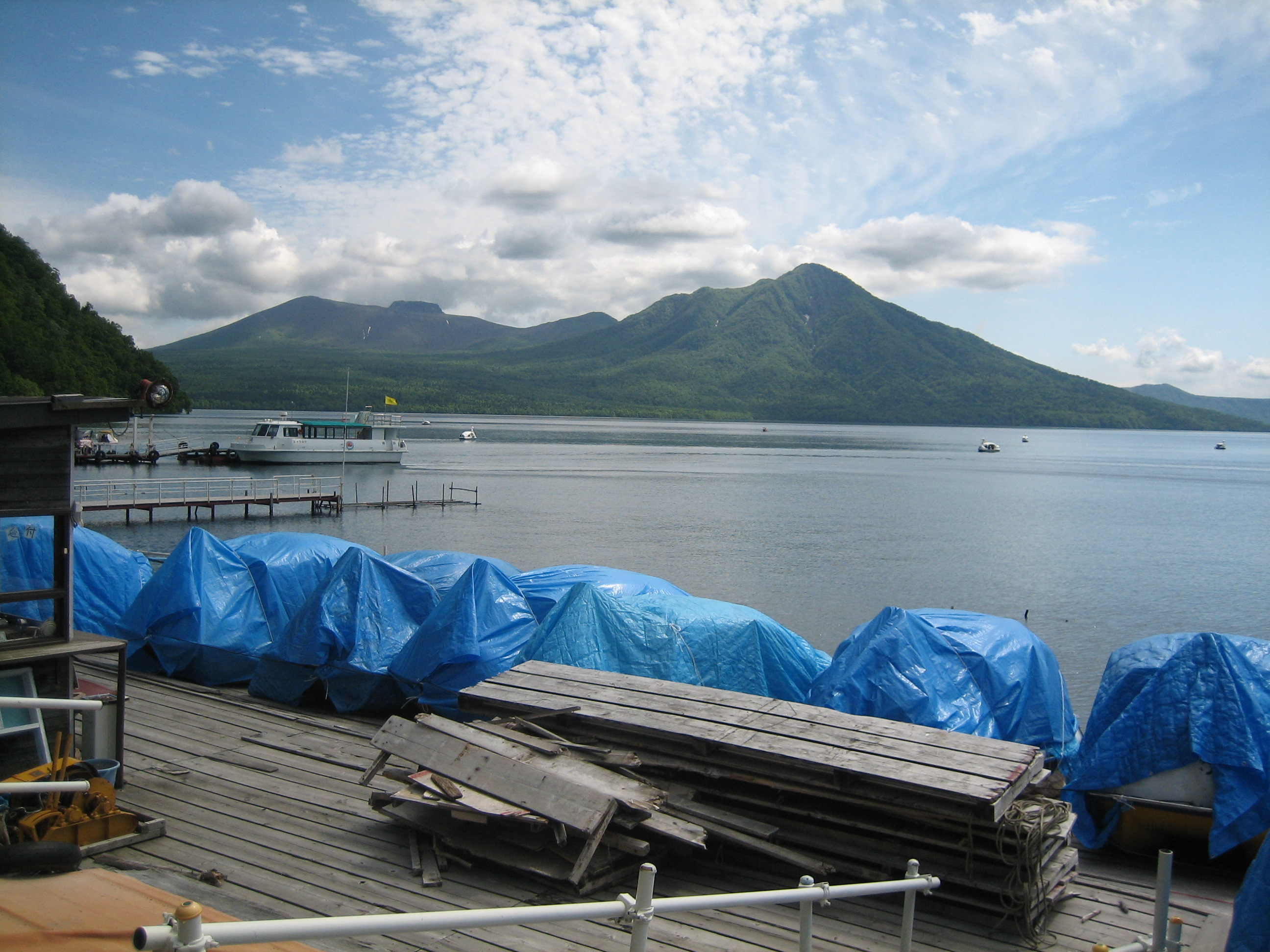
Mount Tarumae, Japan

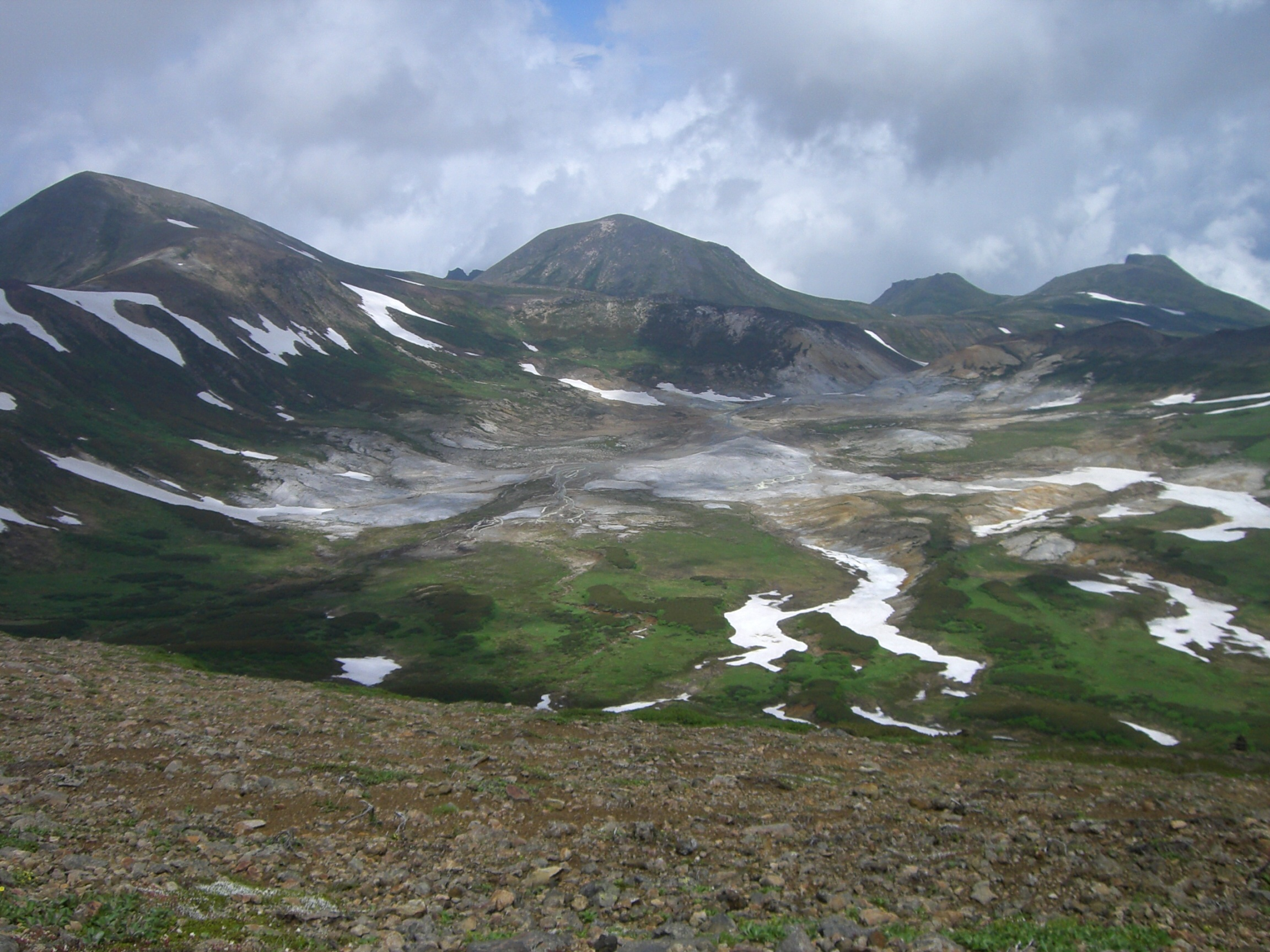
Daisetsuzan Volcanic Group, Japan

- Mount Keigetsu
- Mount Hokuchin
- Mount Hakuun
- Mount Ryōun
- Mount Kuro
- Shikaribetsu Volcanic Group
- Mount Tarumae, Hokkaidō
- Mount Yoko
- Shinmoedake
- Shōwa-shinzan

=== Philippines ===
- Musuan Peak
- Mount Bijang
- Mount Olila
- Mount Bulalo
- Turupiche (Tanauan Hill)
- San Antonio
- Calamba

=== Russia ===
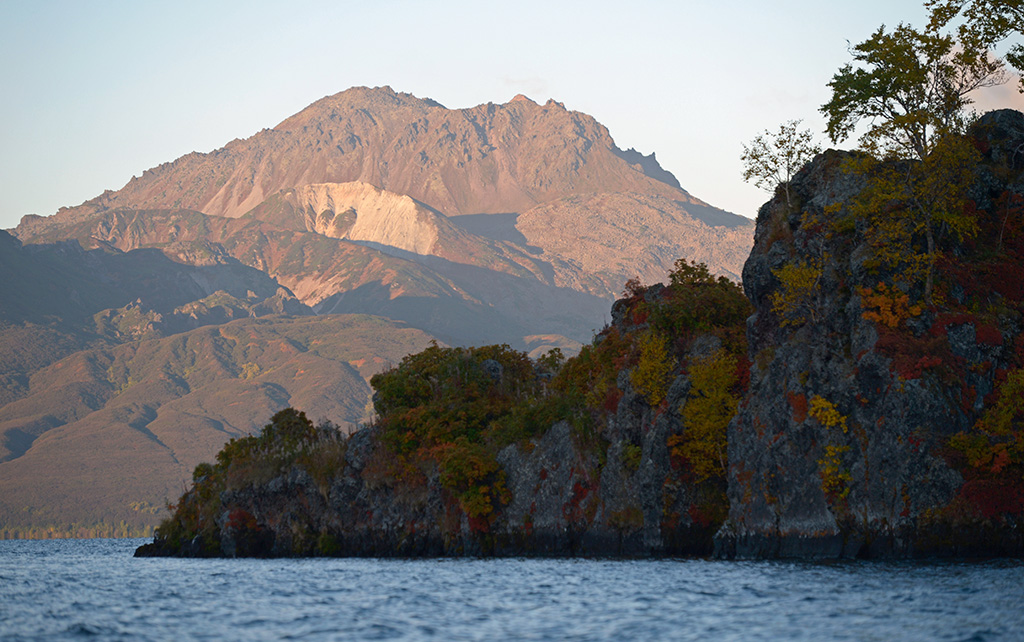
Ridge of lava domes of Diky Greben complex, Russia

- Diky Greben
- Barkhatnaya Sopka
- Astrid Island^{:Alaid island?}
- Ichinsky - two domes atop of volcano's somma

=== Taiwan ===
- Tatun Volcano Group

=== Turkey ===
- Göllü Dağ

== Europe ==
=== France ===
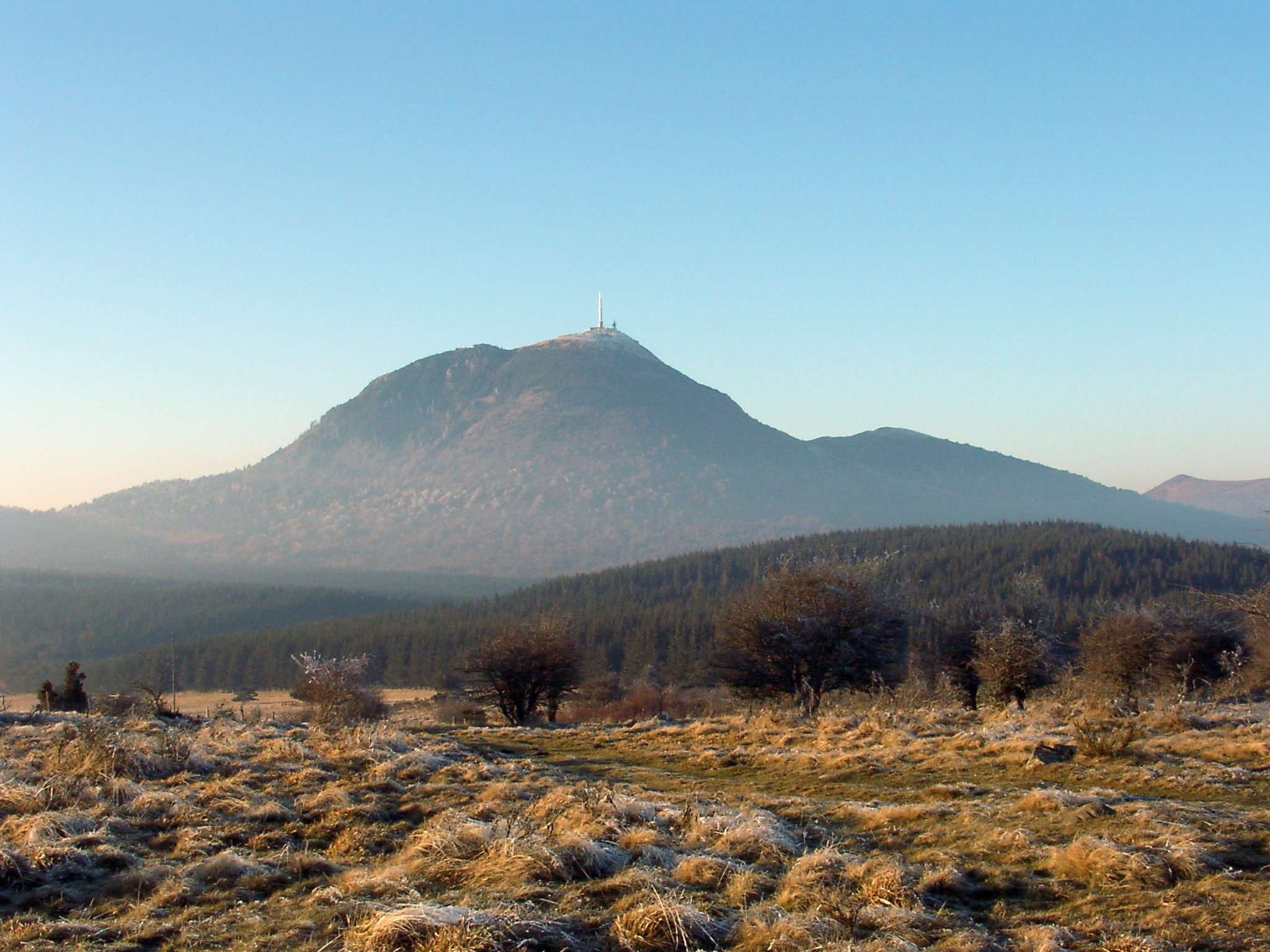
Puy-de-Dôme, France

- Mont Gerbier de Jonc, Ardèche
- Puy-de-Dôme, Clermont-Ferrand

=== Greece ===
- Gyali, Dodecanese
- Methana Volcano

=== Iceland ===
- Torfajökull

=== Italy ===
- Monte Amiata, Tuscany

=== United Kingdom ===
- Glynn Hill, County Antrim, Northern Ireland
- Scafell Dacite (including Great Gable), Cumbria, England
- Skerry Fell Fad, Argyll and Bute, Scotland

== North America ==
=== Canada ===
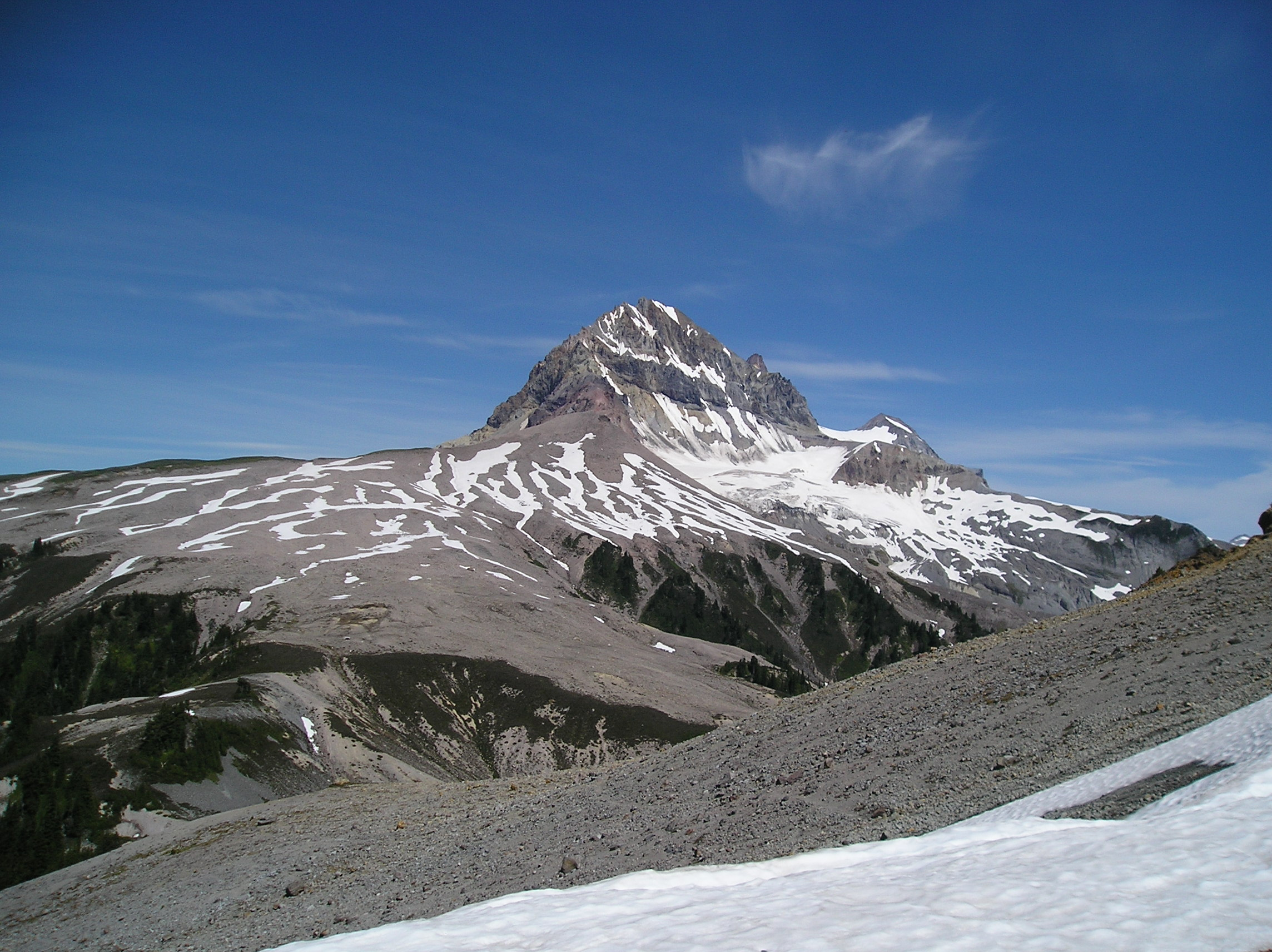
Atwell Peak, British Columbia

Dome or volcano name	Volcanic area	Composition	Last dome eruption or growth episode
Atwell Peak	Garibaldi Volcanic Belt	Rhyolite	Pleistocene
Cartoona Peak	Northern Cordilleran Volcanic Province		Miocene
Mount Cayley	Garibaldi Volcanic Belt	Dacite	200,000 years ago
Ember Ridge	Garibaldi Volcanic Belt	Andesite	Pleistocene-Holocene
Exile Hill	Northern Cordilleran Volcanic Province	Trachyte	Pliocene
Glacier Dome	Northern Cordilleran Volcanic Province		Pleistocene
Glacier Pikes	Garibaldi Volcanic Belt		Pleistocene
Heart Peaks	Northern Cordilleran Volcanic Province	Rhyolite	Unknown
IGC Centre	Northern Cordilleran Volcanic Province		Miocene
Mount Meager massif	Garibaldi Volcanic Belt	Dacite	2,350 years ago
Mount McNeil	-	Rhyolite	Tertiary
Nanook Dome	Northern Cordilleran Volcanic Province	-	Pleistocene
Pharaoh Dome	Northern Cordilleran Volcanic Province	-	Pleistocene
Sezill Volcano	Northern Cordilleran Volcanic Province	-	Pleistocene
Silverthrone Mountain	Garibaldi Volcanic Belt	-	Holocene
Spectrum Dome	Northern Cordilleran Volcanic Province	-	Pliocene
Sphinx Dome	Northern Cordilleran Volcanic Province	-	Pleistocene
Sturgeon Lake Caldera	Wabigoon greenstone belt	-	Neoarchean
Tadeda Peak	Northern Cordilleran Volcanic Province	-	Miocene
The Pyramid	Northern Cordilleran Volcanic Province	-	Pleistocene
Triangle Dome	Northern Cordilleran Volcanic Province	-	Pleistocene

=== Grenada ===
- Mount Saint Catherine

=== Mexico ===
- Huitepec, Chiapas, Mexico
- Las Derrumbadas, Puebla, Mexico
- Popocatepetl, Mexico
- El Chichon, Chiapas, Mexico

=== United States ===
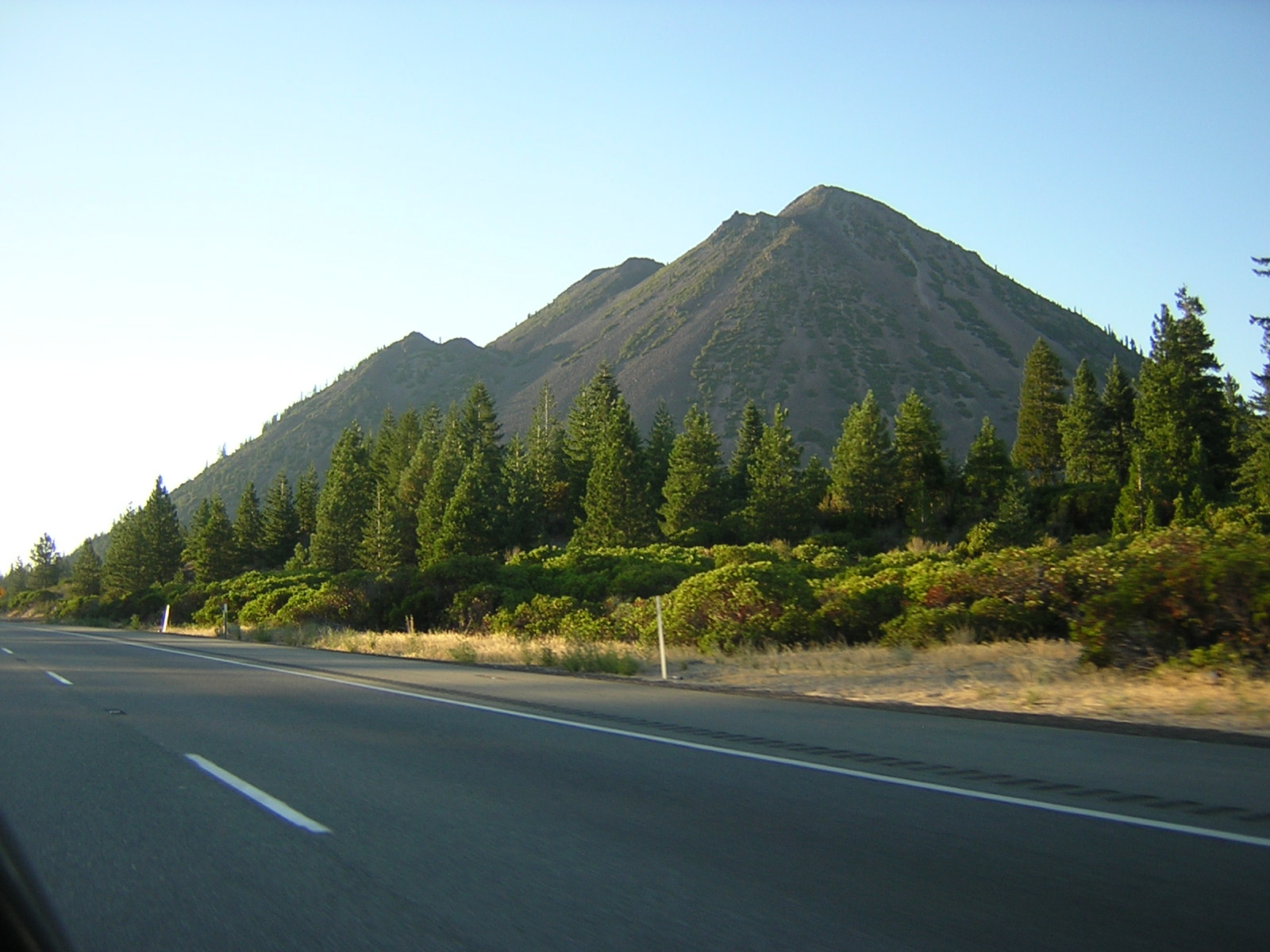
Black Butte, California

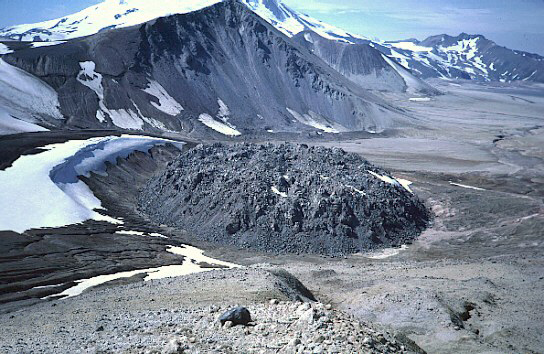
Novarupta, Alaska

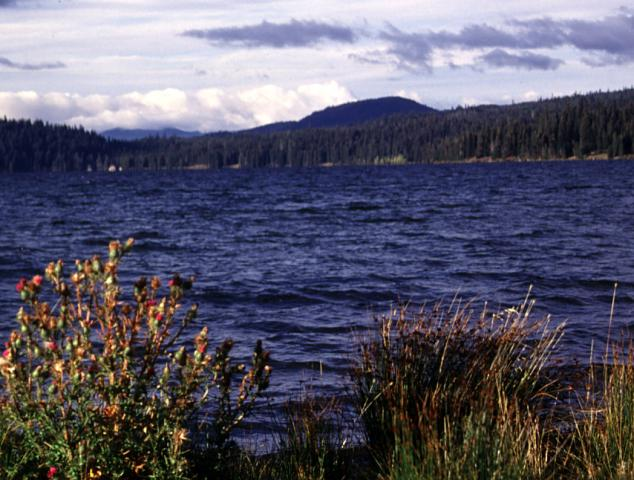
Cinnamon Butte, Oregon

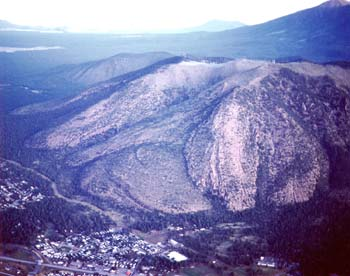
Mount Elden, Arizona

- Augustine Volcano, Alaska
- Bare Mountain, Washington
- Big Southern Butte, Idaho
- Bill Williams Mountain, Arizona
- Black Butte, California
- Chaos Crags, California
- Cinnamon Butte, Oregon
- Cline Buttes, Oregon
- Coso Volcanic Field, California
- Glass Mountain, California
- Hager Mountain, Oregon
- Hayrick Butte, Oregon
- Hogg Rock, Oregon
- Kendrick Peak, Arizona
- Lassen Peak, California
- Little Glass Mountain, California
- Mammoth Mountain, California
- Marble Mountain-Trout Creek Hill, Washington
- Middle Butte, Idaho
- Mono–Inyo Craters, California
- Mount Elden, Arizona
- Mount Hannah, California
- Mount Hoffman, California
- Mount Konocti, California
- Mount Mazama, Oregon
- Mullet Island, California
- Newberry Volcano, Oregon
- Novarupta, Alaska
- O'Leary Peak, Arizona
- Obsidian Butte, California
- Panum Crater, California
- Paulina Peak, Oregon
- Powell Buttes, Oregon
- Red Island Volcano, California
- Rock Hill, California
- Salton Buttes, California
- Sitgreaves Mountain, Arizona
- Steamboat Springs, Nevada
- Sugarloaf Peak, Arizona
- Sutter Buttes, California
- Unnamed lava dome under Crater Lake, Oregon
- West Crater, Washington

== South America ==
=== Argentina ===
Dome or volcano name	Volcanic area	Composition	Last dome eruption or growth episode
Tipas	Central Volcanic Zone		
Trocon	Southern Volcanic Zone	Andesite to Dacite	

=== Bolivia ===
- Cerro Chascon-Runtu Jarita complex
- Nuevo Mundo volcano

=== Chile ===
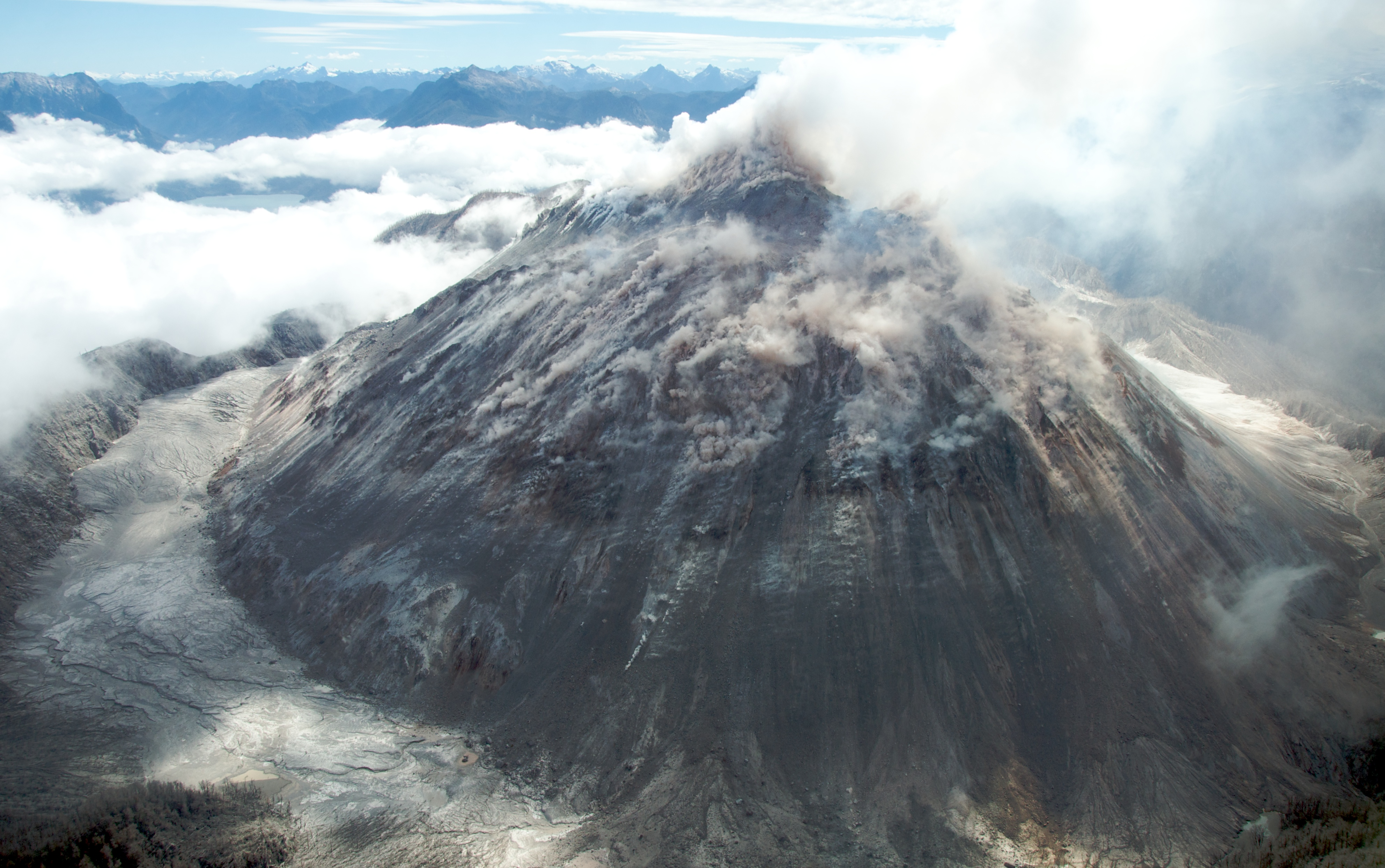
Aerial view of the rhyolitic lava dome of Volcán Chaitén in Chile (2009)

Dome or volcano name	Volcanic area	Composition	Last dome eruption or growth episode
Cerros de Saltar	Central Volcanic Zone	Dacite	Pliocene
Chaitén	Southern Volcanic Zone	Rhyolite	2010
Cerro Chao	Central Volcanic Zone	Dacite	Quaternary
Cerro Porquesa	Central Volcanic Zone	Rhyodacite	Pliocene/Pleistocene
Chillahuita	Central Volcanic Zone		
Corona Dome Complex	Central Volcanic Zone	Andesite	Quaternary
Cordón Caulle	Southern Volcanic Zone	Rhyodacite to Rhyolite	Holocene
Fueguino	Austral Volcanic Zone		Holocene
Lascar	Central Volcanic Zone	Dacite	2007
Volcán Nuevo	Southern Volcanic Zone	Dacite	1986
Sollipulli	Southern Volcanic Zone	Andesite to Dacite	
Taapaca	Central Volcanic Zone		Holocene

== Oceania ==
=== New Zealand ===
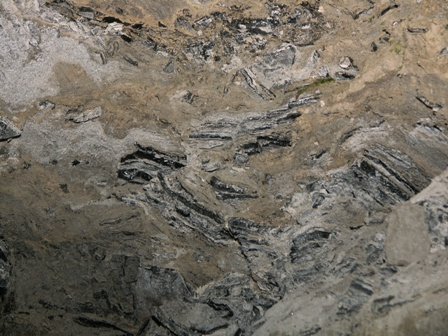
Obsidian veins at Ben Lomond, New Zealand

- Ben Lomond, North Island
- Mount Tarawera, North Island
- Mangere Mountain, North Island

=== Australia ===
- Prospect Hill, New South Wales

== Extraterrestrial lava domes ==
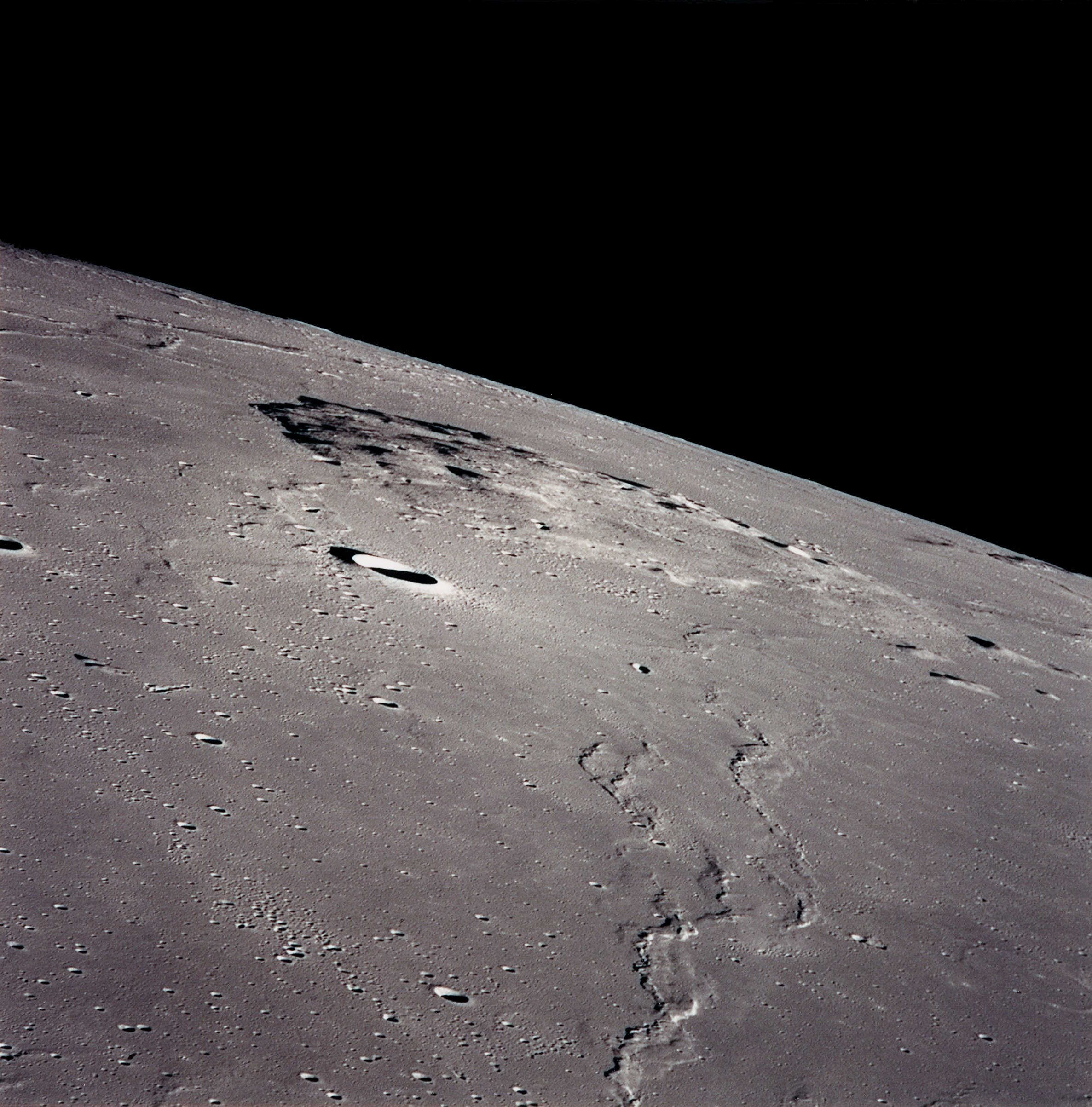
Mons Rümker from Apollo 15

- Mons Rümker, near side of the Moon

== See also ==
- List of stratovolcanoes
- List of shield volcanoes
- List of cinder cones
