= Mount Midori =

Volcanic mountain on the island of Hokkaido, Japan

- 緑岳
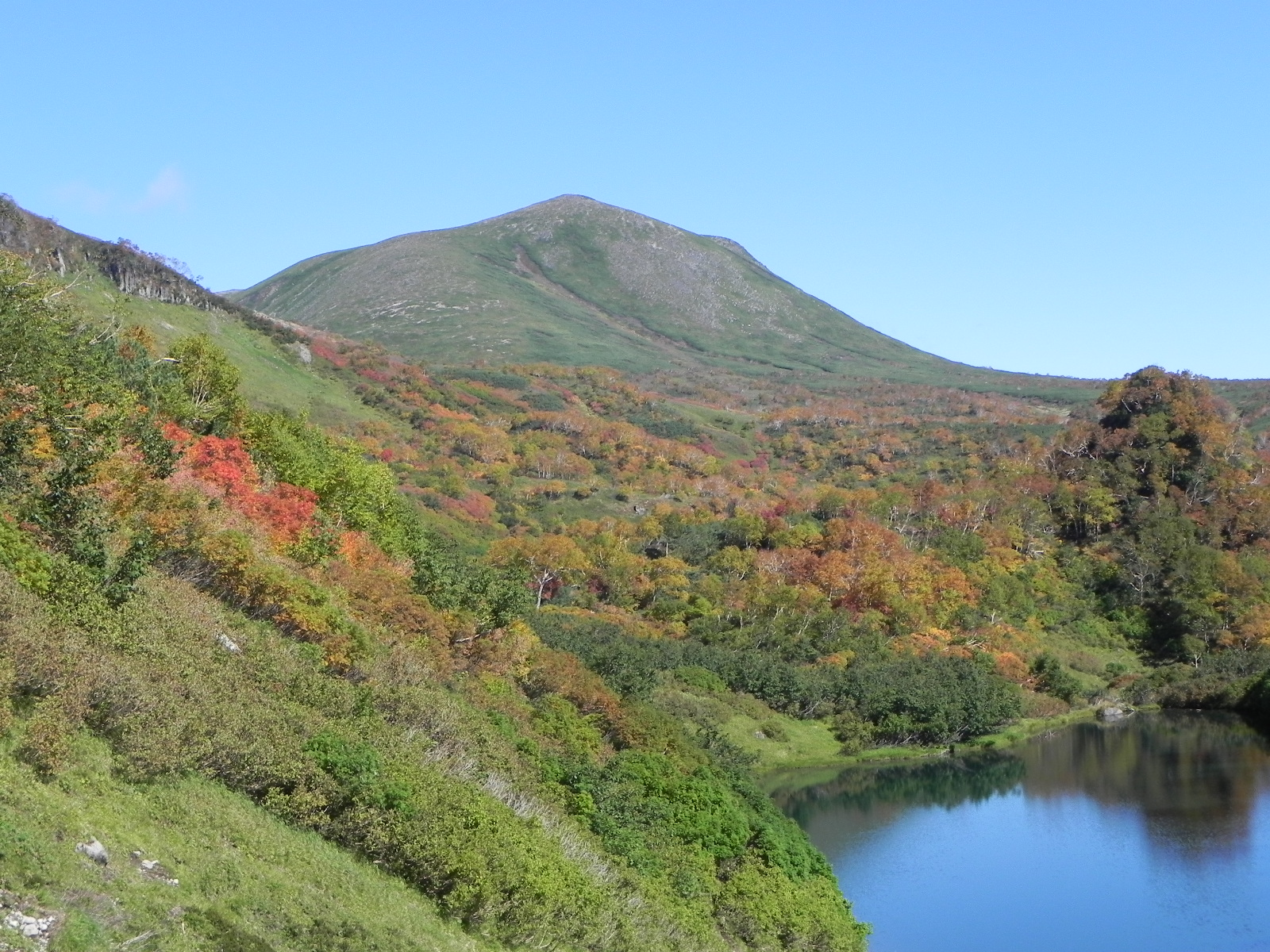
- The SSW face.

Highest point
- Elevation: 2,019.9 m (6,627 ft)
- Prominence: 30 m (98 ft)
- Parent peak: Mount Koizumi
- Listing: List of mountains and hills of Japan by height
- Coordinates: 43°38′59″N 142°55′13″E

Naming
- English translation: green mountain
- Language of name: Japanese
- Pronunciation: [midoɾidake]

Geography
- Location within Japan Location within Hokkaido
- Location: Hokkaidō, Japan
- Parent range: Daisetsuzan Volcanic Group
- Topo map(s): Geographical Survey Institute 25000:1 白雲岳; 50000:1 旭岳

Geology
- Mountain type: volcanic
- Volcanic arc: Kurile arc

Mount Midori (緑岳, Midori-dake), also known as Mount Matsuura (松浦岳, Matsuura-dake), is a mountain located in the Daisetsuzan Volcanic Group of the Ishikari Mountains, Hokkaidō, Japan.

== See also ==
- List of volcanoes in Japan
- List of mountains in Japan
