= Mount Goshiki =

Volcanic mountain on the island of Hokkaido

- 五色岳
- Location within Japan Location within Hokkaido

Highest point
- Elevation: 2,038 m (6,686 ft)
- Prominence: 8 m (26 ft)
- Parent peak: Mount Hakuun
- Listing: List of mountains and hills of Japan by height
- Coordinates: 43°40′17″N 142°54′46″E

Geography
- Location: Hokkaidō, Japan
- Parent range: Daisetsuzan Volcanic Group
- Topo map(s): Geographical Survey Institute 25000:1 層雲峡; 25000:1 白雲岳; 50000:1 大雪山; 50000:1 旭岳

Geology
- Mountain type: volcanic
- Volcanic arc: Kurile arc

Mount Goshiki (五色岳, Goshiki-dake) is a mountain located in the Daisetsuzan Volcanic Group of the Ishikari Mountains, Hokkaidō, Japan.

== See also ==
- List of volcanoes in Japan
- List of mountains in Japan
