= Mount Eboshi =

Stratovolcano on the island of Honshu, Japan

- 烏帽子岳
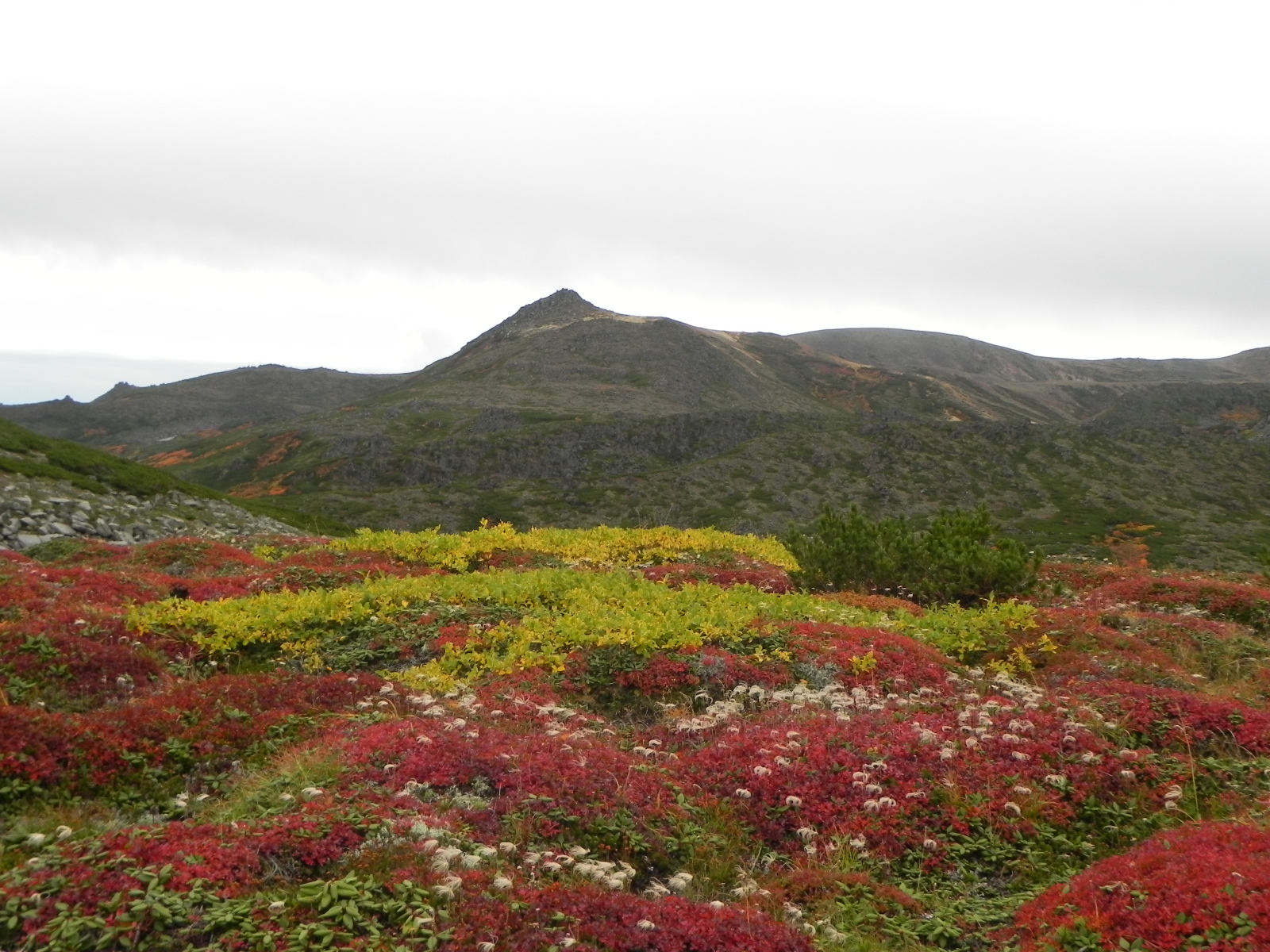
- The North face.

Highest point
- Elevation: 2,072 m (6,798 ft)
- Prominence: 82 m (269 ft)
- Parent peak: Mount Hakuun
- Listing: List of mountains and hills of Japan by height
- Coordinates: 43°40′50″N 142°55′19″E

Geography
- Location within Japan Location within Hokkaido
- Location: Hokkaidō, Japan
- Parent range: Daisetsuzan Volcanic Group
- Topo map: Geographical Survey Institute 25000:1, 50000:1

Geology
- Mountain type: stratovolcano
- Volcanic arc: Northeastern Japan Arc

Mount Eboshi (烏帽子岳, Eboshi-dake) is a stratovolcano located in the Daisetsuzan Volcanic Group of the Ishikari Mountains in central Hokkaido, Japan.

== See also ==
- List of volcanoes in Japan
- List of mountains in Japan
