= Mount Matsuda =

Volcanic mountain on the island of Hokkaido, Japan

- 松田岳
- Location within Japan Location within Hokkaido

Highest point
- Elevation: 2,136 m (7,008 ft)
- Prominence: 16 m (52 ft)
- Parent peak: Mount Hokkai
- Listing: List of mountains and hills of Japan by height
- Coordinates: 43°40′21″N 142°53′25″E

Geography
- Location: Hokkaidō, Japan
- Parent range: Daisetsuzan Volcanic Group
- Topo map(s): Geographical Survey Institute 25000:1 愛山溪温泉; 50000:1 大雪山

Geology
- Mountain type: volcanic
- Volcanic arc: Kurile arc

Mount Matsuda (松田岳, Matsuda-dake) is a mountain located in the Daisetsuzan Volcanic Group of the Ishikari Mountains, Hokkaidō, Japan. It sits on the southern rim of the Ohachi Taira caldera.

== See also ==
- List of volcanoes in Japan
- List of mountains in Japan
