= Mount Keigetsu =

Lava dome on the island of Hokkaido, Japan

- 桂月岳
- Location within Japan Location within Hokkaido

Highest point
- Elevation: 1,938 m (6,358 ft)
- Prominence: 68 m (223 ft)
- Parent peak: Mount Kuro
- Listing: List of mountains and hills of Japan by height
- Coordinates: 43°41′53″N 142°54′38″E

Naming
- Language of name: Japanese

Geography
- Location: Hokkaidō, Japan
- Parent range: Daisetsuzan Volcanic Group
- Topo map(s): Geographical Survey Institute 25000:1 層雲峡; 50000:1 大雪山

Geology
- Mountain type: lava dome
- Volcanic arc: Kurile arc

Mount Keigetsu (桂月岳, Keigetsu-dake) is located in the Daisetsuzan Volcanic Group of the Ishikari Mountains, Hokkaidō, Japan.

It sits within Daisetsuzan National Park and overlooks the town of Sounkyo.

== See also ==
- List of volcanoes in Japan
- List of mountains in Japan
