= Mount Aibetsu =

Volcano located on the island of Hokkaido, Japan

- 愛別岳
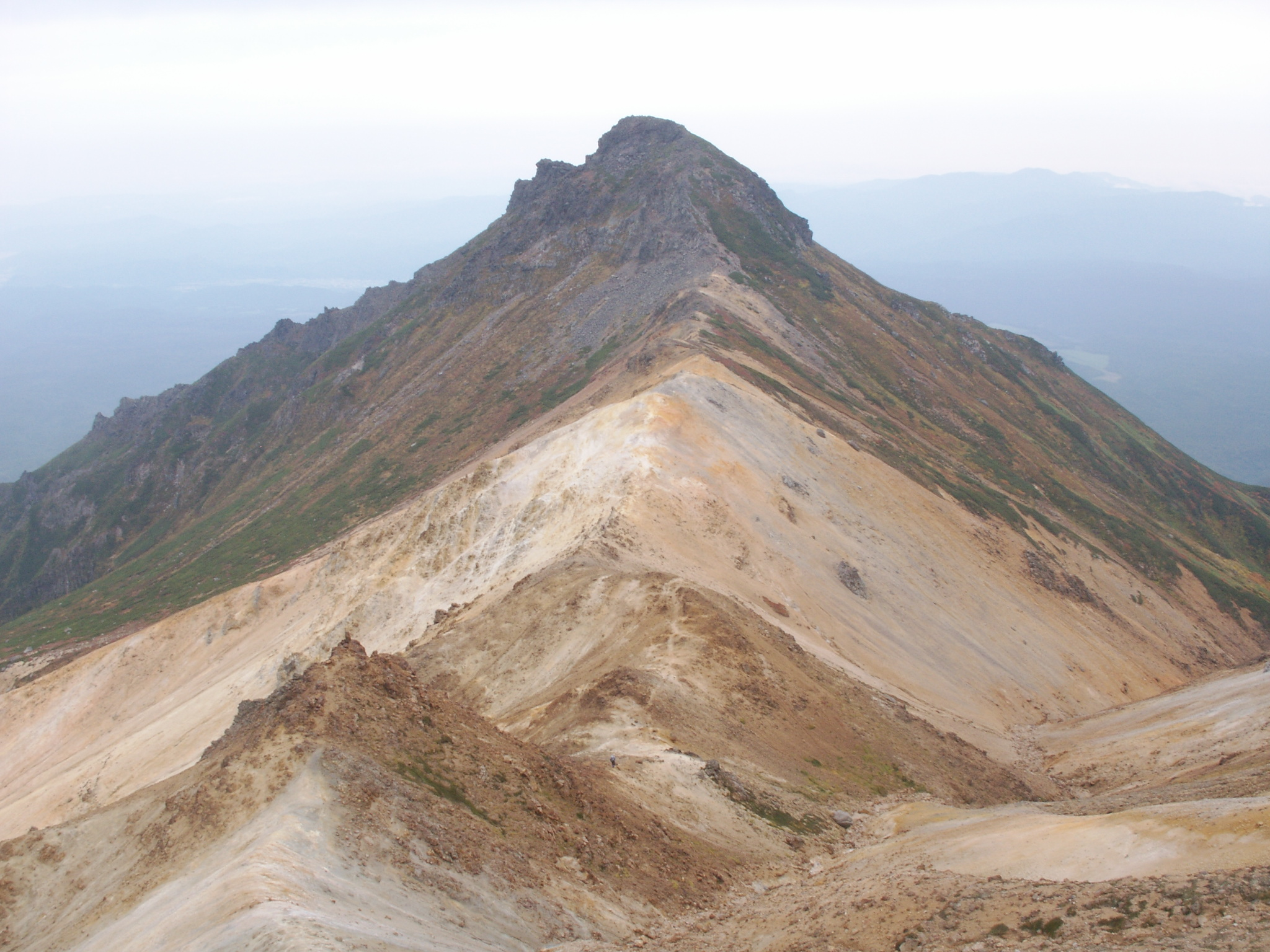
- Seen from the south

Highest point
- Elevation: 2,112.7 m (6,931 ft)
- Prominence: 112.7 m (370 ft)
- Parent peak: Mount Pippu
- Listing: Mountains and hills of Japan
- Coordinates: 43°42′29″N 142°51′26″E

Geography
- Location within Japan
- Location: Hokkaido, Japan
- Parent range: Daisetsuzan Volcanic Group
- Topo map(s): Geographical Survey Institute 25000:1 愛山溪温泉; 50000:1 大雪山

Geology
- Mountain type: volcano
- Volcanic arc: Kurile arc

Mount Aibetsu (愛別岳, Aibetsu-dake) is a mountain located in the Daisetsuzan Volcanic Group of the Ishikari Mountains, Hokkaidō, Japan.

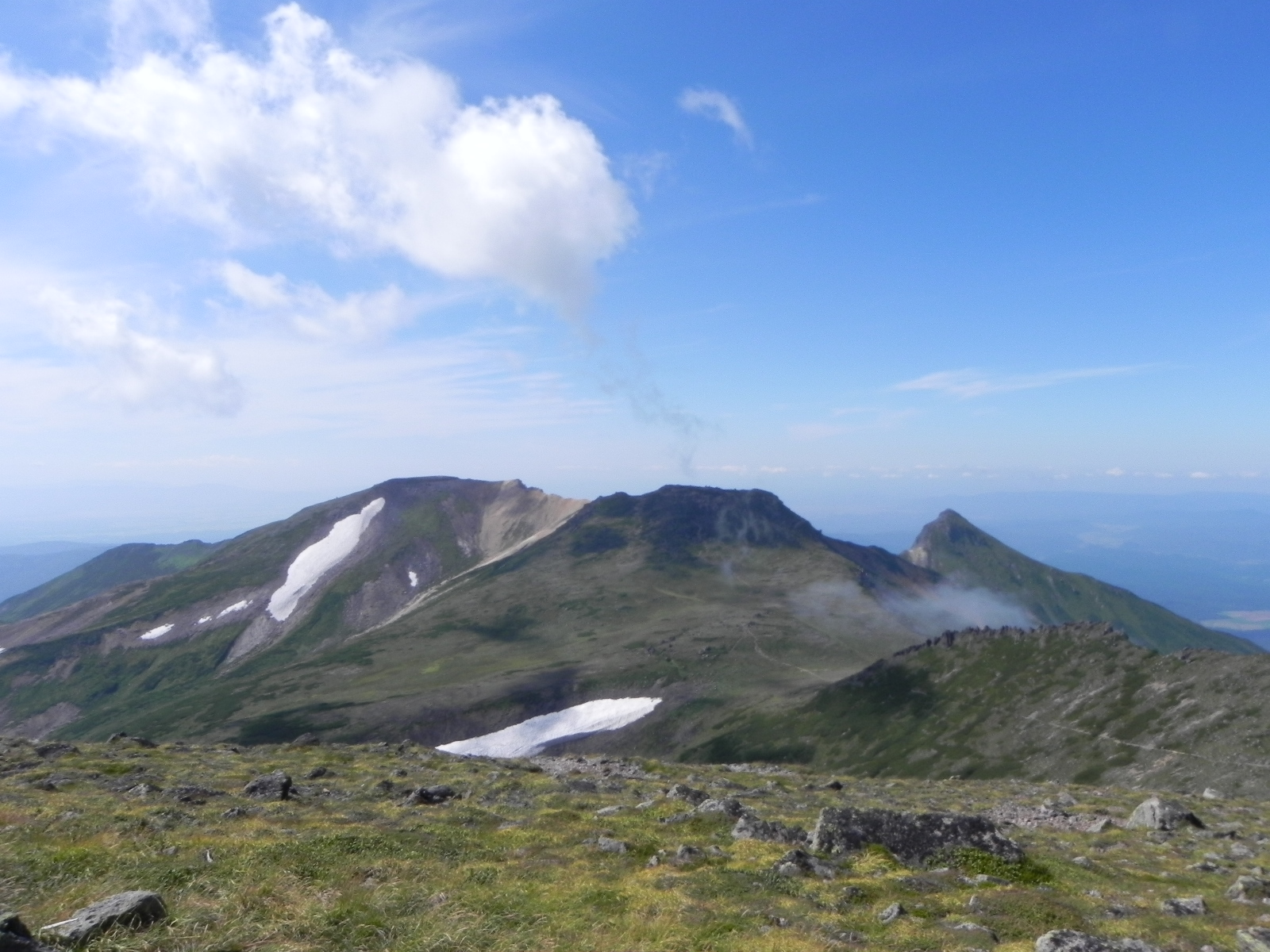
Mount Aibetsu on the right, seen from the SE. Mount Pippu in the center. Mount Antaroma on the left. Taken from Mount Hokkai.

== See also ==
- List of volcanoes in Japan
- List of mountains in Japan
