= Mount Nagayama =

Stratovolcano on the island of Hokkaido, Japan

- 永山岳
- Location within Japan Location within Hokkaido

Highest point
- Elevation: 1,978 m (6,490 ft)
- Prominence: 18 m (59 ft)
- Parent peak: Mount Pippu
- Listing: List of mountains and hills of Japan by height
- Coordinates: 43°42′6″N 142°50′49″E

Geography
- Location: Hokkaido, Japan
- Parent range: Daisetsuzan Volcanic Group
- Topo map(s): Geographical Survey Institute 25000:1 愛山溪温泉; 50000:1 大雪山

Geology
- Mountain type: stratovolcano
- Volcanic arc: Kurile arc

Mount Nagayama (永山岳, Nagayama-dake) is a stratovolcano located in the Daisetsuzan Volcanic Group of the Ishikari Mountains, Hokkaido, Japan.

== See also ==
- List of volcanoes in Japan
