= Mount Nokogiri (Hokkaido) =

Volcanic mountain on the island of Hokkaido, Japan

- 鋸岳
- Location within Japan Location within Hokkaido

Highest point
- Elevation: 2,142 m (7,028 ft)
- Prominence: 32 m (105 ft)
- Parent peak: Mount Hokuchin
- Listing: List of mountains and hills of Japan by height
- Coordinates: 43°41′51″N 142°52′35″E

Geography
- Location: Hokkaido, Japan
- Parent range: Daisetsuzan Volcanic Group
- Topo map(s): Geospatial Information Authority 25000:1 層雲峡; 25000:1 愛山溪温泉; 50000:1 大雪山

Geology
- Mountain type: volcanic
- Volcanic arc: Kurile arc

Mount Nokogiri (鋸岳, Nokogiri-dake) is a mountain located in the Daisetsuzan Volcanic Group of the Ishikari Mountains, Hokkaido, Japan.

== See also ==
- List of volcanoes in Japan
- List of mountains in Japan
