= Mount Kuma =

Stratovolcano on the island of Hokkaido, Japan

- 熊ヶ岳
- Location within Japan Location within Hokkaido

Highest point
- Elevation: 2,210 m (7,250 ft)
- Prominence: 136 m (446 ft)
- Parent peak: Mount Asahi
- Listing: List of mountains and hills of Japan by height
- Coordinates: 43°40′14″N 142°51′43″E

Naming
- English translation: mountain of bears
- Language of name: Japanese
- Pronunciation: [ku͍maɡadake]

Geography
- Location: Hokkaidō, Japan
- Parent range: Daisetsuzan Volcanic Group
- Topo map(s): Geographical Survey Institute 25000:1 旭岳; 25000:1 愛山溪温泉; 25000:1 層雲峡; 25000:1 白雲岳; 50000:1 旭岳; 50000:1 大雪山

Geology
- Mountain type: stratovolcano
- Volcanic arc: Kurile arc

Mount Kuma (熊ヶ岳, Kuma-ga-dake), or Mount Kumaga, is a stratovolcano located in the Daisetsuzan Volcanic Group of the Ishikari Mountains, Hokkaidō, Japan.

== See also ==
- List of volcanoes in Japan
- List of mountains in Japan
