= Mount Pippu =

Volcano on the island of Hokkaido, Japan

- 比布岳
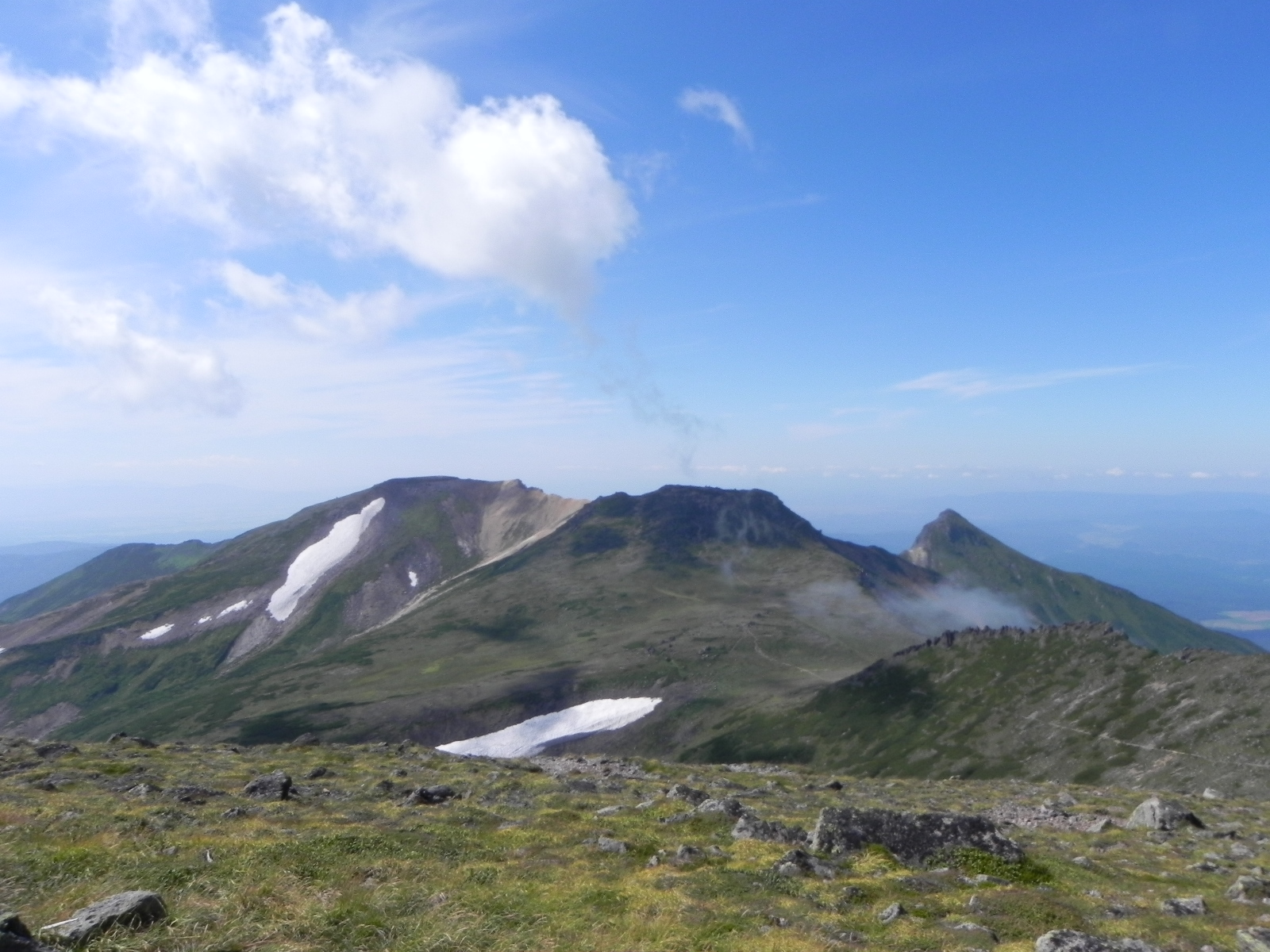
- Mount Pippu in the center. Mount Antaroma on the left. Mount Aibetsu on the right.

Highest point
- Elevation: 2,197 m (7,208 ft)
- Prominence: 147 m (482 ft)
- Parent peak: Mount Hokuchin
- Listing: List of mountains and hills of Japan by height
- Coordinates: 43°41′56″N 142°51′47″E

Geography
- Location within Japan Location within Hokkaido
- Location: Hokkaidō, Japan
- Parent range: Daisetsuzan Volcanic Group
- Topo map(s): Geographical Survey Institute 25000:1 層雲峡; 50000:1 大雪山

Geology
- Mountain type: volcanic

Mount Pippu (比布岳, Pippu-dake) is a mountain located in the Daisetsuzan Volcanic Group of the Ishikari Mountains, Hokkaidō, Japan. It is in the Daisetsuzan Volcanic Group. The mountain is part of the larger Daisetsuzan National Park, which is known for its diverse alpine flora and fauna.

== Geography ==
Mount Pippu is situated within the Daisetsuzan Volcanic Group, a collection of volcanic peaks that form part of the Ishikari Mountain range. This range is one of the major mountain systems in Hokkaido, the northernmost of Japan's main islands.

The area surrounding Mount Pippu is characterized by rugged, mountainous terrain typical of much of Japan's landscape, where more than four-fifths of the land surface consists of mountains.

== Climate and Ecology ==
Like much of Hokkaido, the area around Mount Pippu experiences cooler temperatures compared to the rest of Japan. The mountain and its surrounding areas are likely to have abundant precipitation, which, combined with the generally mild temperatures, contributes to the lush vegetation cover typical of Japanese mountains.
