= Mount Naka (Daisetsuzan) =

Volcanic mountain on the island of Hokkaido, Japan

- 中岳
- Location within Japan Location within Hokkaido

Highest point
- Elevation: 2,113 m (6,932 ft)
- Listing: List of mountains and hills of Japan by height
- Coordinates: 43°41′10″N 142°52′33″E

Naming
- English translation: middle peak
- Language of name: Japanese
- Pronunciation: [nakadake]

Geography
- Location: Hokkaido, Japan
- Parent range: Daisetsuzan Volcanic Group
- Topo map(s): Geographical Survey Institute 25000:1 層雲峡; 25000:1 愛山溪温泉; 50000:1 大雪山

Geology
- Mountain type: volcanic
- Volcanic arc: Kurile arc

Mount Naka (中岳, Naka-dake) is located in the Daisetsuzan Volcanic Group of the Ishikari Mountains, Hokkaido, Japan. It sits on the north rim of the Ohachidaira caldera.

== See also ==
- List of volcanoes in Japan
- List of mountains in Japan
