= Mount Aka (Daisetsuzan) =

Stratovolcano on the island of Honshu, Japan

- 赤岳
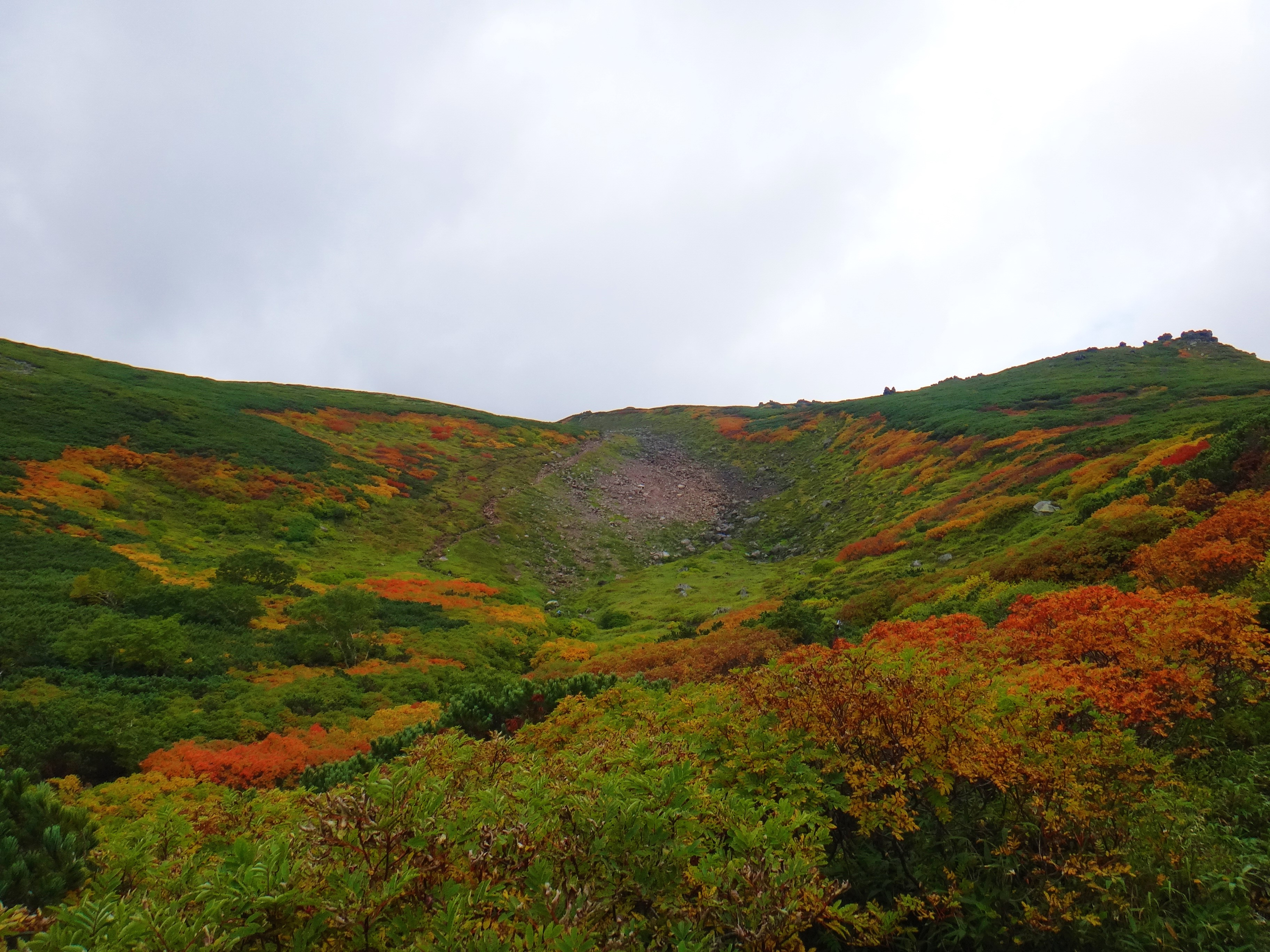

Highest point
- Elevation: 2,078.5 m (6,819 ft)
- Prominence: 8.5 m (28 ft)
- Parent peak: Mount Koizumi
- Listing: List of mountains and hills of Japan by height
- Coordinates: 43°40′28″N 142°55′36″E

Naming
- English translation: red peak
- Language of name: Japanese
- Pronunciation: Japanese: [akadake]

Geography
- Location within Japan
- Location: Hokkaidō, Japan
- Parent range: Daisetsuzan Volcanic Group
- Topo map(s): Geographical Survey Institute 25000:1 層雲峡; 50000:1 大雪山

Geology
- Mountain type: Stratovolcano
- Volcanic arc: Kurile arc

Mount Aka (赤岳, Aka-dake) is a stratovolcano located in the Daisetsuzan Volcanic Group of the Ishikari Mountains, Hokkaidō, Japan.

== See also ==
- List of volcanoes in Japan
- List of mountains in Japan
