= Mount Mamiya =

Volcanic Mountain on the island of Hokkaido, Japan

- 間宮岳
- Location within Japan Location within Hokkaido

Highest point
- Elevation: 2,185 m (7,169 ft)
- Listing: List of mountains and hills of Japan by height
- Coordinates: 43°40′19″N 142°52′22″E

Geography
- Location: Hokkaidō, Japan
- Parent range: Daisetsuzan Volcanic Group
- Topo map(s): Geographical Survey Institute 25000:1 愛山溪温泉; 25000:1 白雲岳; 25000:1 層雲峡; 25000:1 旭岳; 50000:1 旭岳; 50000:1 大雪山

Geology
- Mountain type: volcanic
- Volcanic arc: Kurile arc

Mount Mamiya (間宮岳, Mamiya-dake) is located in the Daisetsuzan Volcanic Group of the Ishikari Mountains, Hokkaidō, Japan. It sits on the western rim of the Ohachidaira caldera.

== See also ==
- List of volcanoes in Japan
- List of mountains in Japan
