= Mount Ryōun =

Lava dome on the island of Hokkaido, Japan

- 凌雲岳
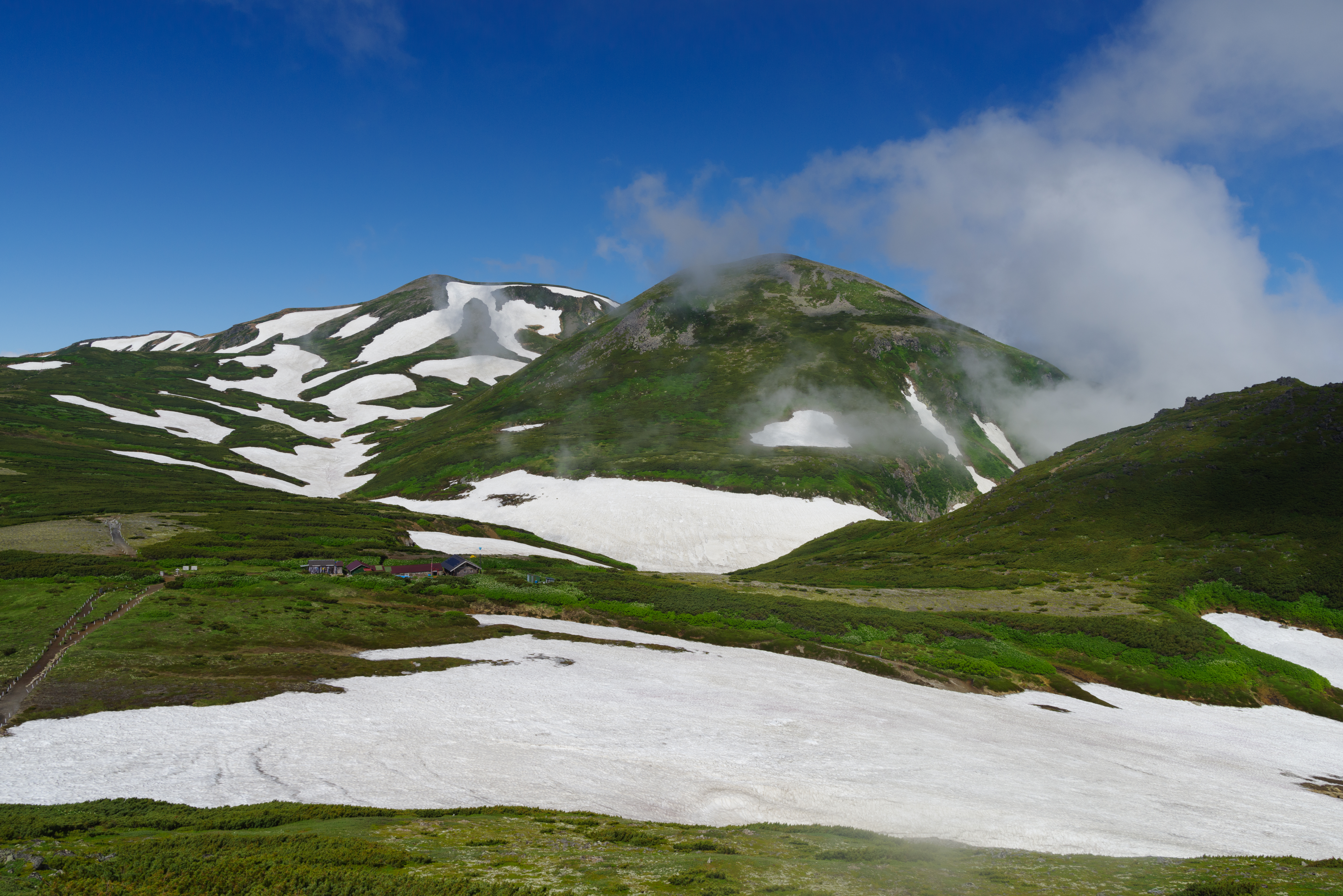
- Mount Ryōun (right) and Mount Hokuchin (left) seen from the East.

Highest point
- Elevation: 2,125 m (6,972 ft)
- Prominence: 165 m (541 ft)
- Parent peak: Mount Hokuchin
- Listing: List of mountains and hills of Japan by height
- Coordinates: 43°41′54″N 142°53′49″E

Geography
- Location within Japan Location within Hokkaido
- Location: Hokkaido, Japan
- Parent range: Daisetsuzan Volcanic Group
- Topo map(s): Geographical Survey Institute 25000:1 層雲峡; 50000:1 大雪山

Geology
- Mountain type: lava dome
- Volcanic arc: Kurile arc

Mount Ryōun (凌雲岳, Ryōun-dake) is a lava dome located in the Daisetsuzan Volcanic Group of the Ishikari Mountains, Hokkaido, Japan.

== See also ==
- List of volcanoes in Japan
- List of mountains in Japan
