= Mount Koizumi =

- 小泉岳
- Location within Japan Location within Hokkaido

Highest point
- Elevation: 2,158 m (7,080 ft)
- Prominence: 38 m (125 ft)
- Parent peak: Mount Hakuun
- Listing: List of mountains and hills of Japan by height
- Coordinates: 43°40′2″N 142°55′16″E

Geography
- Location: Hokkaidō, Japan
- Parent range: Daisetsuzan Volcanic Group
- Topo map(s): Geographical Survey Institute 25000:1 白雲岳; 25000:1 層雲峡; 50000:1 大雪山; 50000:1 旭岳

Geology
- Mountain type: stratovolcano
- Volcanic arc: Kurile arc

Mount Koizumi (小泉岳, Koizumi-dake) is a stratovolcano located in the Daisetsuzan Volcanic Group of the Ishikari Mountains, Hokkaidō, Japan.
