= Mount Tomuraushi (Daisetsuzan) =

Volcano in the Daisetsu Mountains, Hokkaido, Japan

- トムラウシ山
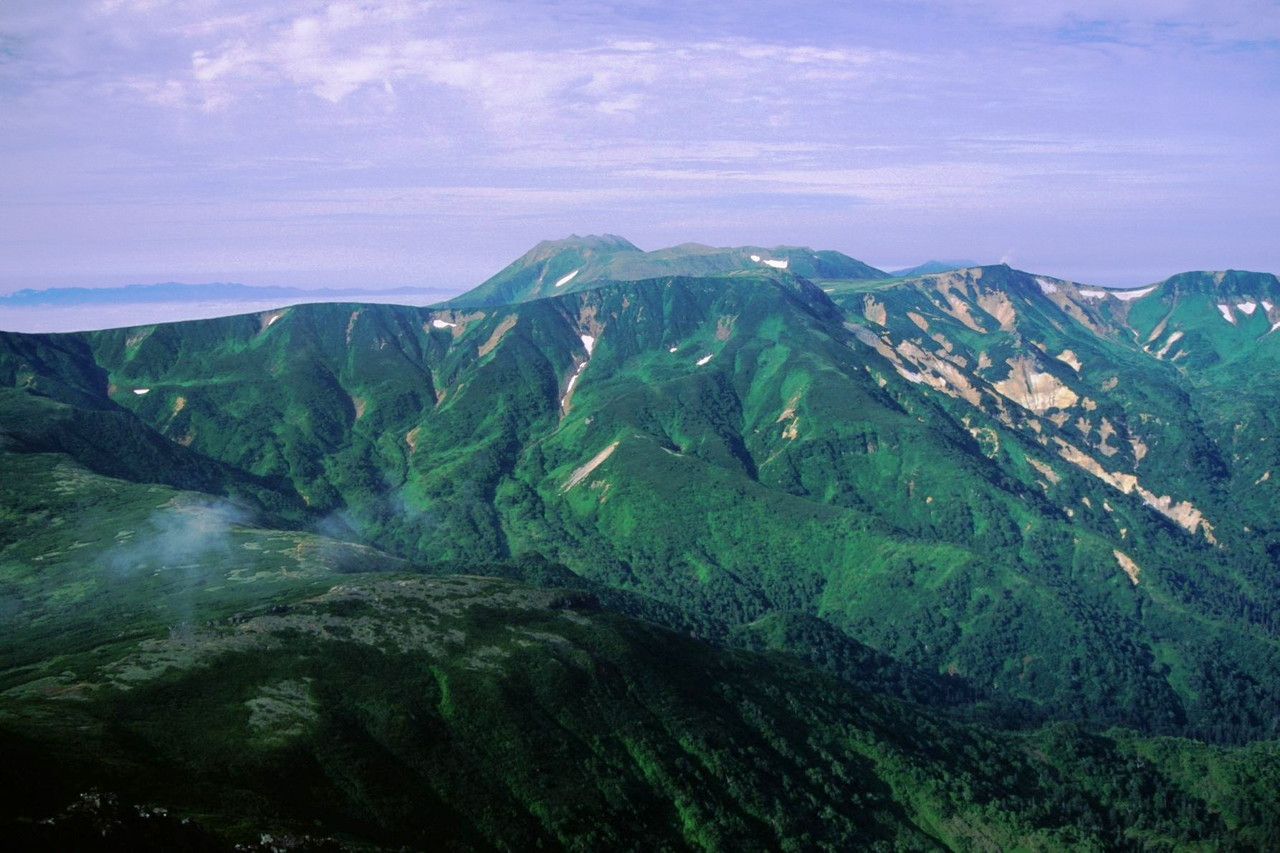
- View of Mount Tomuraushi from Mount Chūbetsu (August 2006)

Highest point
- Elevation: 2,141.2 m (7,025 ft)
- Listing: List of mountains and hills of Japan by height 100 Famous Japanese Mountains
- Coordinates: 43°31′38″N 142°50′55″E

Geography
- Location within Japan Location within Hokkaido
- Location: Hokkaidō, Japan
- Parent range: Tomuraushi Volcanic Group
- Topo map(s): Geographical Survey Institute (国土地理院, Kokudochiriin) 25000:1 トムラウシ山 50000:1 旭岳

Geology
- Rock age: Quaternary
- Mountain type: Volcanic

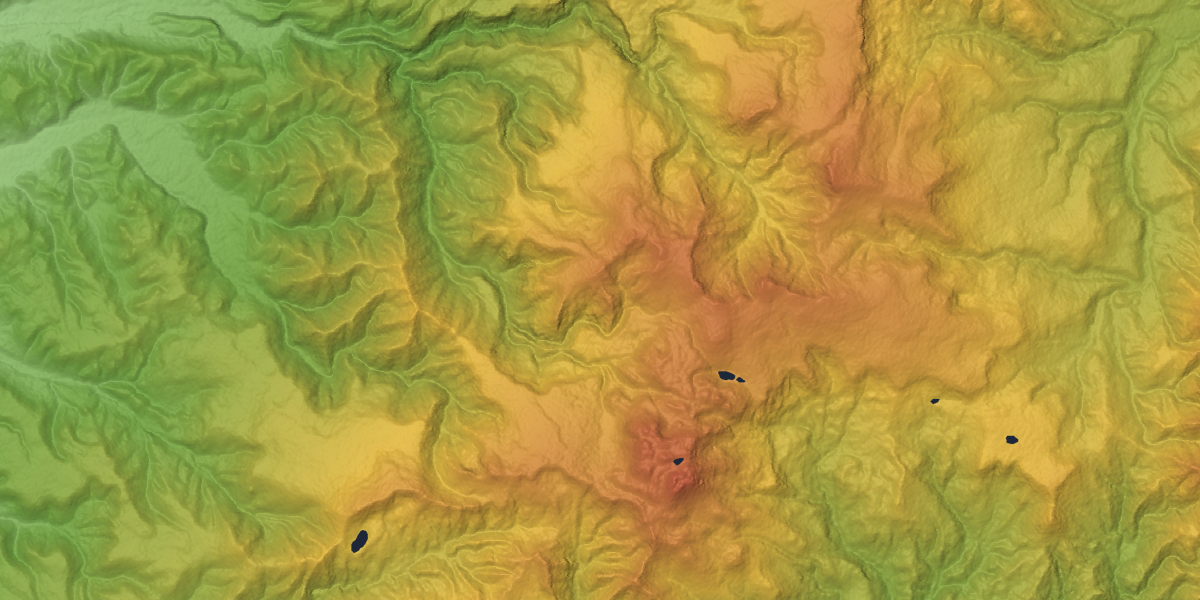
Tomuraushi-Chubetsu Volcano Group

Mount Tomuraushi (トムラウシ山, Tomuraushi-san) is located in Daisetsuzan National Park, Hokkaidō, Japan. Its name was derived from the Ainu words for "place with many flowers" or "place with many water stains". It is one of the 100 famous mountains in Japan.

== Geology ==
The peak of Mount Tomuraushi consists of mainly non-alkalai mafic rock from the Pleistocene to the Holocene.

== History ==
On July 16, 2009, eight members of an adventure tour group on a 4-day hiking trek died of hypothermia in bad weather on Mount Tomuraushi. Five others from the group were helicoptered to safety. The victims were believed to have exhausted themselves in strong winds and rain in an area with few mountain lodges. Police investigated the possibility of professional negligence of the climbing tour operators and guides leading to the deaths. On the same day, another climber died on nearby Mount Biei. The next day a lone hiker was found dead on Mount Tomuraushi.
