= Mount Hokkai =

Mountain on the island of Hokkaido in Japan

- 北海岳
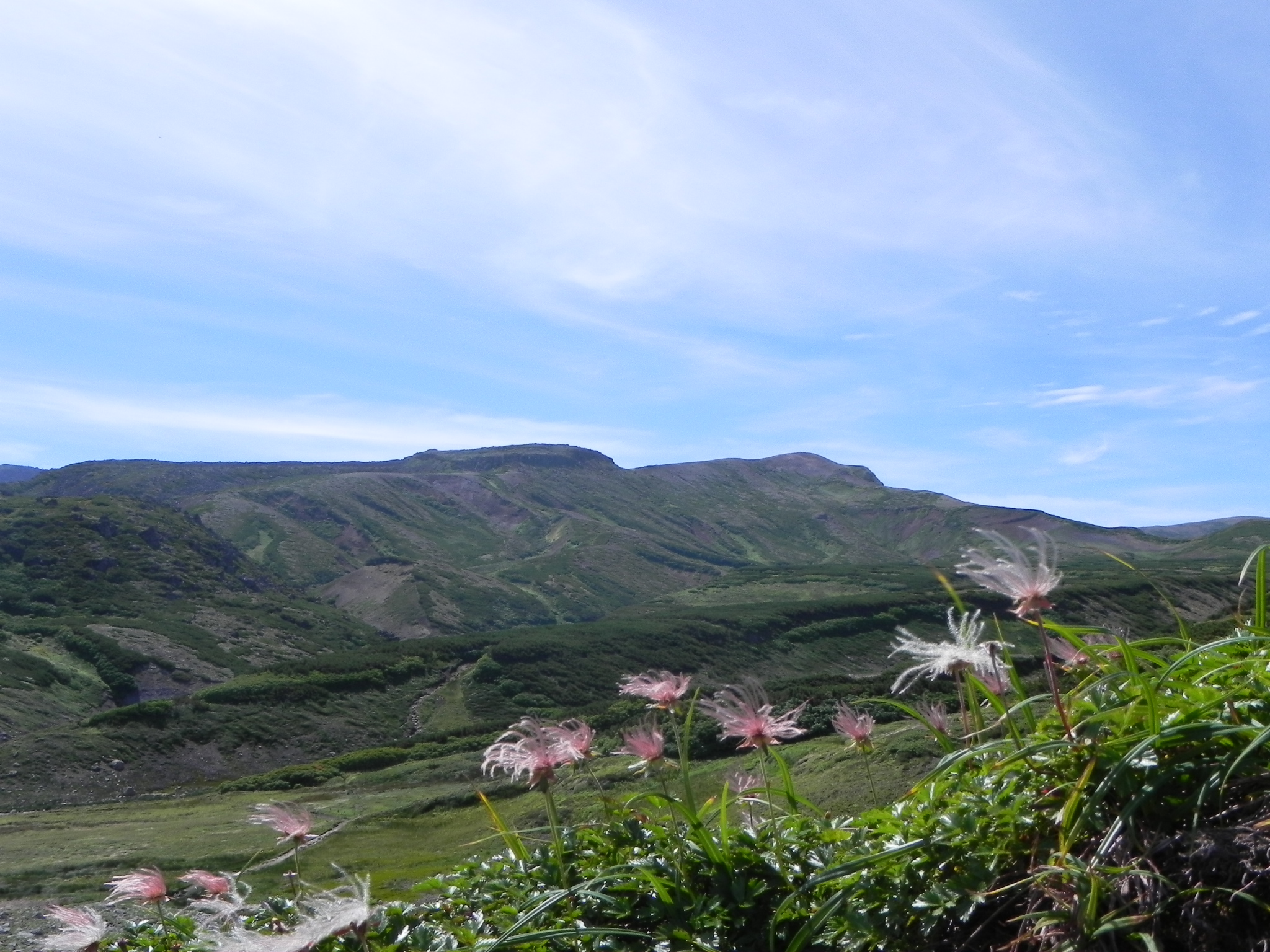

Highest point
- Elevation: 2,149 m (7,051 ft)
- Prominence: 99 m (325 ft)
- Parent peak: Mount Hakuun
- Listing: List of mountains and hills of Japan by height
- Coordinates: 43°40′35″N 142°53′45″E

Geography
- Location: Hokkaidō, Japan
- Parent range: Daisetsuzan Volcanic Group
- Topo map(s): Geographical Survey Institute 25000:1 層雲峡; 50000:1 大雪山

Geology
- Mountain type: volcanic
- Volcanic arc: Kurile arc

Mount Hokkai (北海岳, Hokkai-dake) is a mountain located in the Daisetsuzan Volcanic Group of the Ishikari Mountains, Hokkaidō, Japan. The mountain sits on the southern rim of the Ohachi Daira caldera.
