= Mount Kuro (Hokkaido) =

Lava dome on the island of Hokkaido

- 黒岳
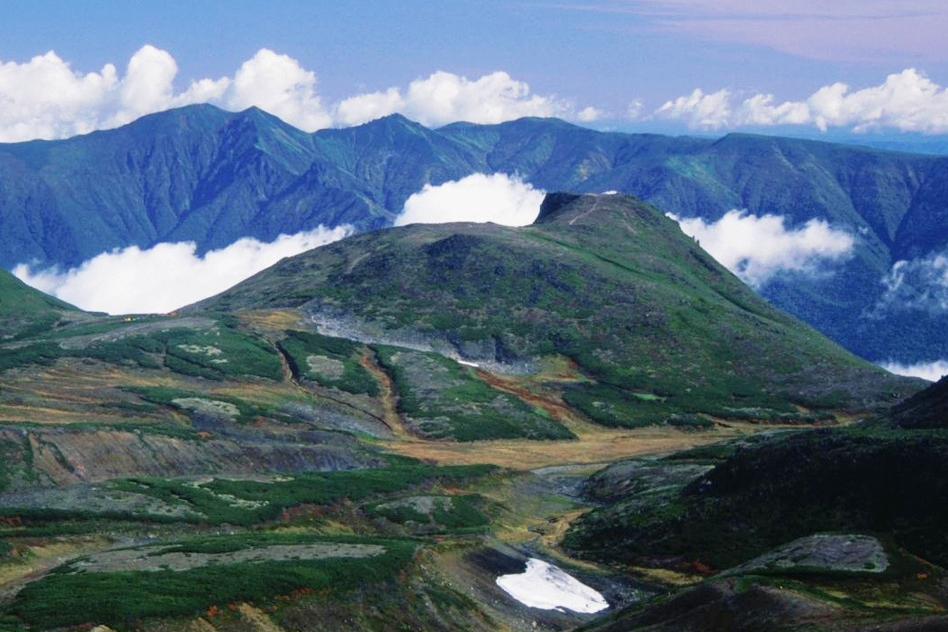
- Mount Kuro seen from the SW

Highest point
- Elevation: 1,984.3 m (6,510 ft)
- Listing: List of mountains and hills of Japan by height
- Coordinates: 43°41′51″N 142°55′13″E

Naming
- English translation: black peak
- Language of name: Japanese

Geography
- Location within Japan Location within Hokkaido
- Location: Hokkaidō, Japan
- Parent range: Daisetsuzan Volcanic Group
- Topo map(s): Geographical Survey Institute 25000:1 層雲峡; 50000:1 大雪山

Geology
- Mountain type: lava dome
- Volcanic arc: Kurile arc

Climbing
- Easiest route: ropeway and hike

Mount Kuro (黒岳, Kuro-dake) is a lava dome located in the Daisetsuzan Volcanic Group of the Ishikari Mountains, Hokkaidō, Japan.

== Climbing route ==
The easiest way up the mountain is to use the Daisetsuzan Sōunkyō Kurodake Ropeway up from Sōunkyō. This takes you approximately 600 metres (2,000 ft) up the mountain. You can then use a chairlift to carry you up past the 1,500 metres (4,900 ft) mark. From there it is a hike with switchbacks the rest of the way to the top. You can also hike the entire route parallel to the ropeway and chairlift from Sōunkyō Onsen. A popular route continues past Mount Kuro, around the Ohachi-Daira caldera, over Mount Asahi and down the Asahidake Ropeway to Asahidake Onsen.

== See also ==
- List of volcanoes in Japan
- List of mountains in Japan
