= Mount Aka =

Mount Aka may refer to:

- Mount Aka (Daisetsuzan), in Daisetsuzan National Park in Hokkaidō, Japan
- Mount Aka (Yatsugatake), in the Southern Yatsugatake Volcanic Group of the Yatsugatake Mountains in Honshū, Japan
