= Daisetsuzan Sōunkyō Kurodake Ropeway =

Aerial lift in Kamikawa, Hokkaido, Japan

Coordinates: 43°43′3.9″N 142°56′37.4″E

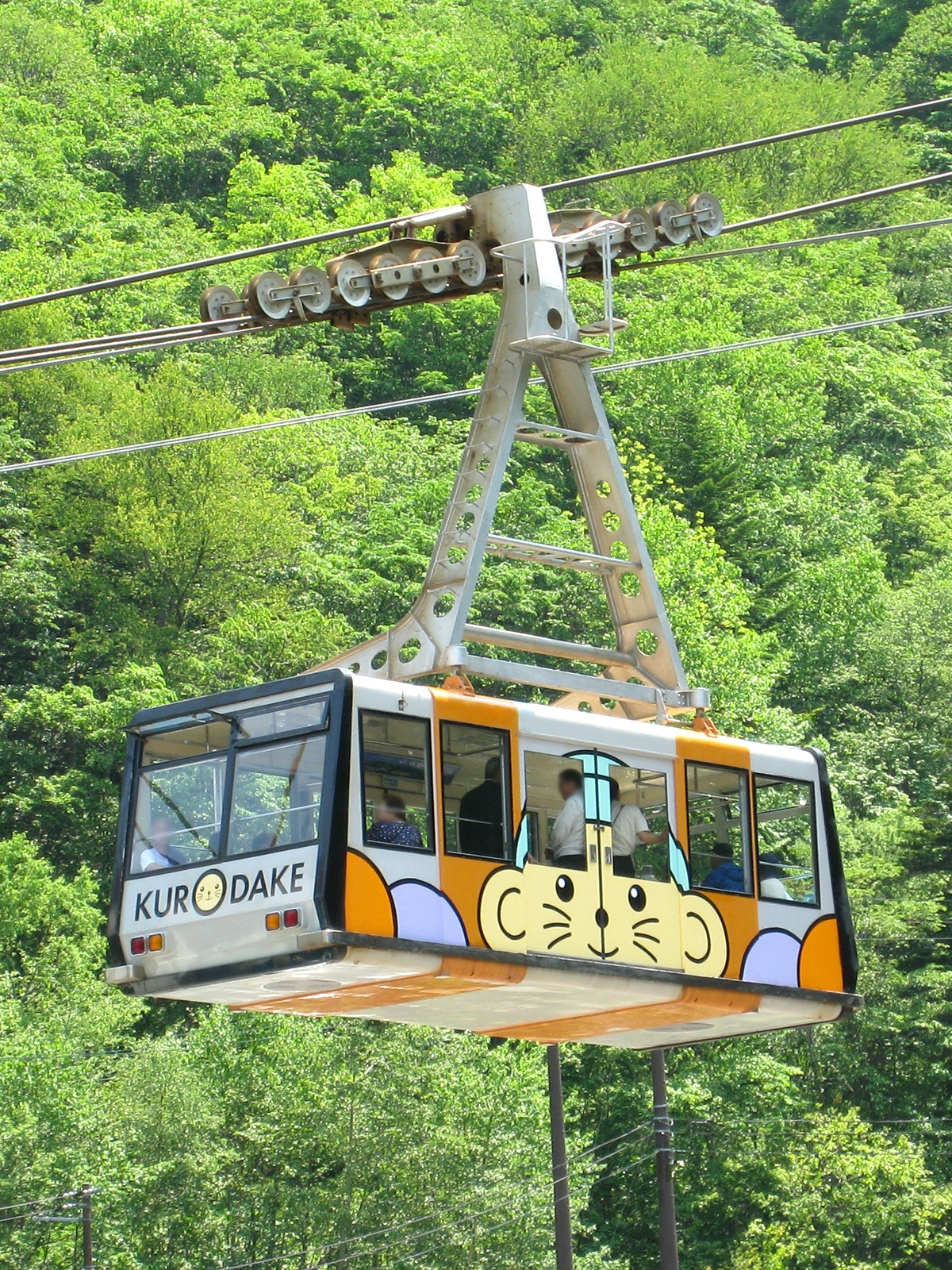
Daisetsuzan Sōunkyō Kurodake Ropeway

The Daisetsuzan Sōunkyō Kurodake Ropeway (大雪山層雲峡・黒岳ロープウェイ, Daisetsuzan Sōunkyō Kurodake Rōpuwei) is a Japanese aerial lift line in Kamikawa, Hokkaidō, operated by Rinyū Kankō (りんゆう観光). The company also operates a travel agency, a hotel in Asahidake Onsen, and chairlifts at Mount Moiwa Ski Resort, Sapporo. Opened in 1967, the aerial lift climbs Mount Kuro of the Daisetsuzan Mountains from the Sounkyo Onsen (層雲峡温泉) hot spring resort. A chairlift is connected to the line, climbing higher. The line transports skiers in winter, hikers in summer, and autumn color spectators in autumn. This is currently the northernmost aerial lift (excluding chairlifts) in the country, after Wakkanai Kōen Ropeway (稚内公園ロープウェイ) in Wakkanai closed in 2006.

== Basic data ==
- System: Aerial tramway, 2 track cables and 2 haulage ropes
- Cable length: 1.6 kilometres (1.0 mi)
- Vertical interval: 629 m (2,064 ft)
- Maximum gradient: 29°54′
- Operational speed: 5.0 m/s
- Passenger capacity per a cabin: 101
- Cabins: 2
- Stations: 2
- Duration of one-way trip: 7 minutes

== See also ==
- List of aerial lifts in Japan
