= Tomuraushi Volcanic Group =

Naming
- Native name: トムラウシ火山群; Tomuraushi-kazangun

Geography
- Country: Japan
- State: Hokkaidō
- Subprefectures: Kamikawa subprefecture and Tokachi subprefecture
- Parent range: Ishikari Mountains
- Biome: alpine climate

Geology
- Orogeny: island arc
- Rock age: Quaternary
- Rock type: volcanic

Tomuraushi Volcanic Group (トムラウシ火山群, Tomuraushi-kazangun) is a volcanic group in Hokkaidō, Japan. Along with the Daisetsuzan Volcanic Group they make up the Ishikari Mountains in Daisetsuzan National Park. The group consists of andesite and dacite stratovolcanoes and lava domes.

== List of volcanoes ==
The following table lists the mountains in the volcanic group.

Name	Height	Type
Mount Tomuraushi (Daisetsuzan) (トムラウシ山, Tomuraushi-san)	2,141 metres (7,024 ft)	
Mount Koganegahara (黄金ヶ原火山, Kogane-ga-hara-kazan)	1,912 metres (6,273 ft)	Lava dome
Mount Goshikigahara (五色ヶ原火山, Goshiki-ga-hara-kazan)	1,954 metres (6,411 ft)	Stratovolcano
Mount Numanohara (沼ノ原山, Numa-no-hara-san)	1,505 metres (4,938 ft)	Lava dome
Mount Kaunnai (カウンナイ火山, Kaunnai-kazan)	1,300 metres (4,300 ft)	Lava flow
Mount Futamata (Daisetsuzan) (二股山, Futamata-sn)	1,155.6 metres (3,791.3 ft)	Lava flow
