= Sōunkyō =

Coordinates: 43.7284°N 142.9498°E

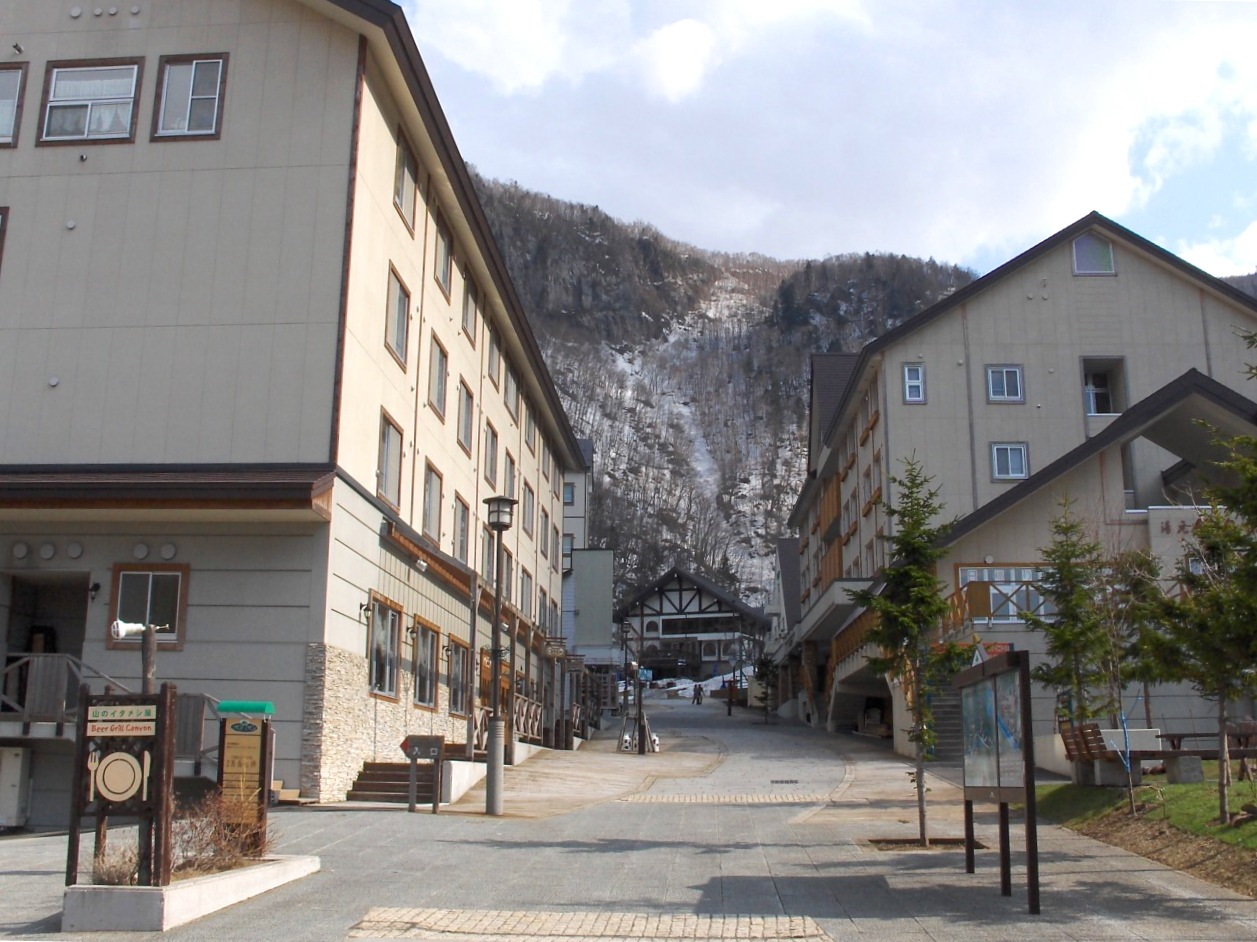
Sōunkyō hot spring resorts

Sōunkyō (層雲峡, Sōunkyō) is a range of gorges located in Kamikawa, Hokkaidō, Japan. Situated in the Daisetsuzan National Park, the area is known for its hotels and onsen (hot springs) resorts as well as waterfalls and magnificent cliffs scenery. The term "Sōunkyō" means respectively the layer (層), cloud (雲) and gorge (峡) in Japanese, and the origin of the name is a word "Souunbetsu" in the Ainu language, which means "the river with many waterfalls".

== History ==
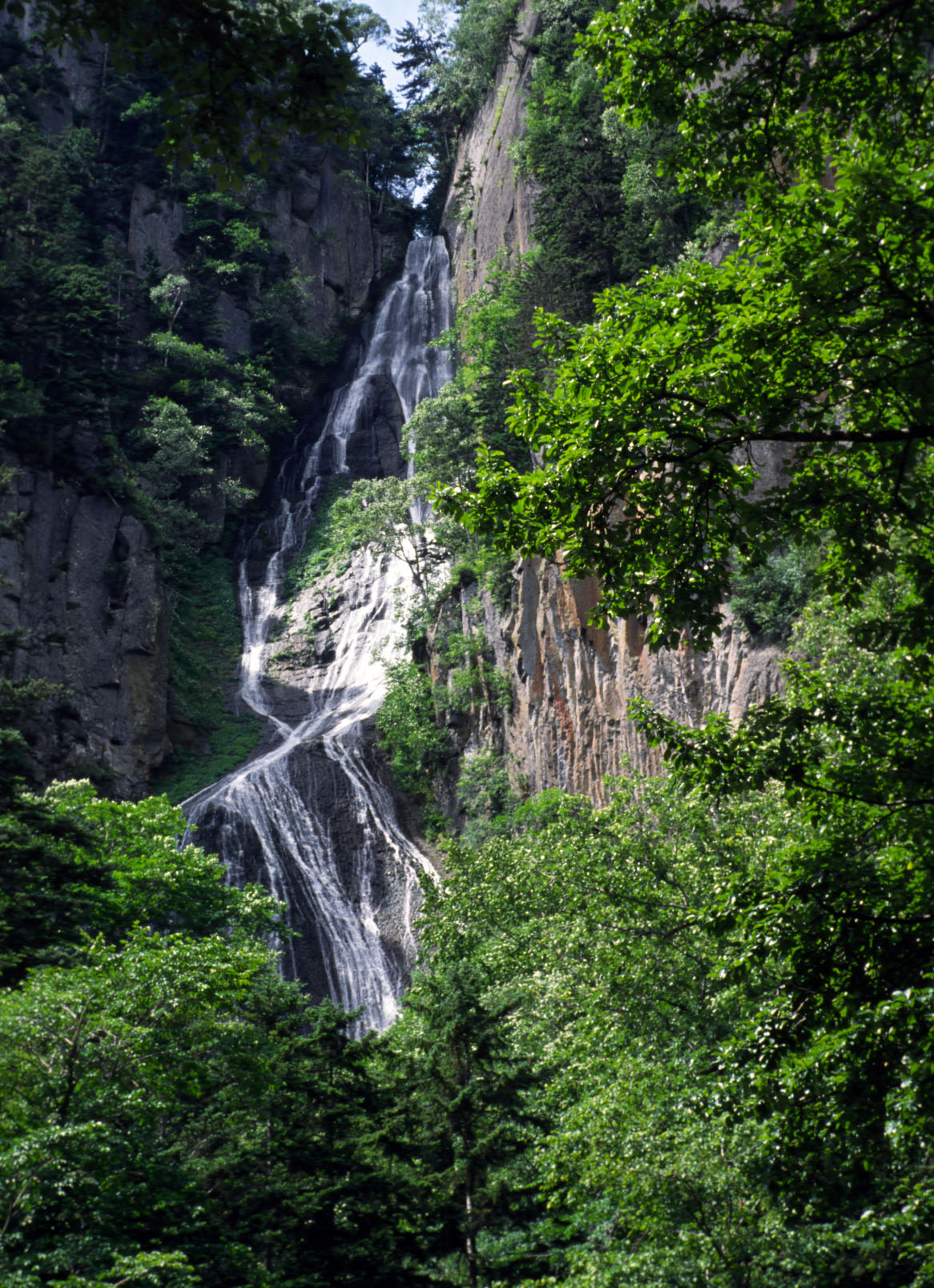
Ginga Falls in Sōunkyō

The geography of the gorge and surrounding area were formed by the eruption of Daisetsuzan Volcanic Group, which occurred around 30,000 years ago. The welded tuff was piled up after the eruption, and it was gradually eroded by the water of the Ishikari River, which currently streams between gorges. Thus, ragged steep cliffs in Sōunkyō were shaped, which range over 24 kilometres. and have a number of joints around 200 metres in height

In 1957, stores and hotels located in the areas surrounding Sōunkyō were relocated to Sōunkyō under the order of the Kamikawa government. They became the origin of the Sōunkyō Onsen (hot springs) Resort. This was a part of the plan to arrange Kamikawa town by the government, and the resort has thrived with many hotels and souvenir shops, formerly constructed for mountaineers, although later they have decayed due to the other resorts in Hokkaidō such as Shiretoko.

To renovate its run-down resorts, Sōunkyō and Ministry of the Environment collaborated on a reconstruction scheme in 1987. 36 buildings that were in the area were demolished and integrated into 18 hotels, which were designed with ivory coloured walls and sharp roofs representing Daisetsuzan. Most of the onsen resorts were completed in July 1998, and many tourists have visited. Currently, the annual number of tourists is 3 million. Recently, the center of the onsen resorts were arranged as the "Canyon Mall," which was modeled after the mountain resorts in Canada.

== Overview ==
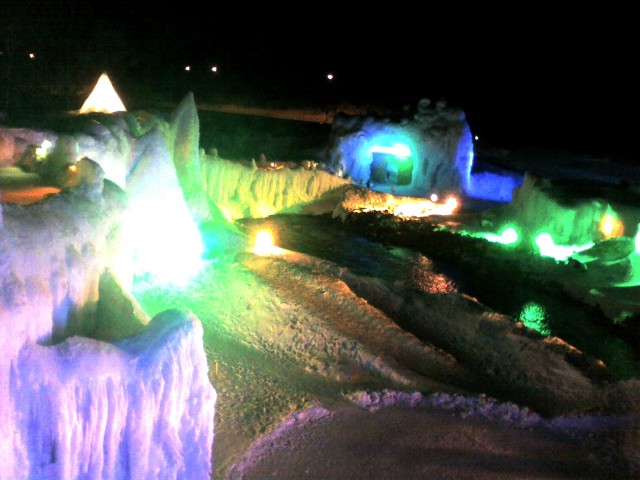
Illuminated ice statues in the Sōunkyō Hyōbaku Festival

The gorge is known not only for its hot springs and hotel resorts but also for its natural scenery. The Ginga-no-taki (銀河の滝, Milky Way Falls) and Ryūsei-no-taki (流星の滝, Shooting Stars Falls) were selected as one of the top 100 waterfalls in Japan. The Daisetsuzan Sōunkyō Kurodake Ropeway is on the slope of the gorge, and tourists can get the ropeway and chairlift to climb the mountain. The Sōunkyō Visitor Center is near the resorts and houses picture panels displaying the scenes of Sōunkyō and guides for visitors.

In every January, the Sōunkyō Hyōbaku Festival is held at the riverbed of Ishikari River, and many ice statues and objects are constructed, some of which are colourfully illuminated. Tourists are able to buy souvenirs and hot drinks in some nearby stores, and fireworks are displayed on weekends. Other events held in this festival include a dance of the Ainu, Yosakoi Soran team, and taiko.
