= Ben Lomond (Waikato) =

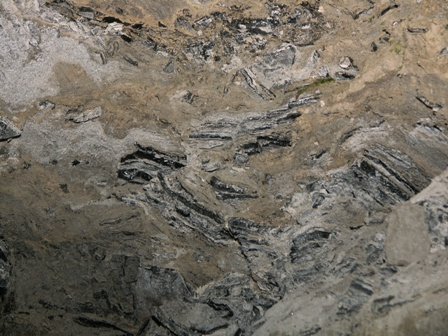
- Obsidian veins at Ben Lomond

Highest point
- Elevation: 744 m (2,441 ft)
- Coordinates: 38°35.7′S 175°57.2′E

Geography
- Map centered on Ben Lomond that shows surrounding approximate selected surface volcanic deposits with rhyolite in violet. Rhyolitic ignimbrite surface deposits are various shades of violet. Legend: Key for the volcanics that are shown with panning is: '"`UNIQ--templatestyles-00000003-QINU`"' basalt (shades of brown/orange); '"`UNIQ--templatestyles-00000004-QINU`"' monogenetic basalts; '"`UNIQ--templatestyles-00000005-QINU`"' undifferentiated basalts of the Tangihua Complex in Northland Allochthon; '"`UNIQ--templatestyles-00000006-QINU`"' arc basalts; '"`UNIQ--templatestyles-00000007-QINU`"' arc ring basalts; '"`UNIQ--templatestyles-00000008-QINU`"' dacite; '"`UNIQ--templatestyles-00000009-QINU`"' andesite (shades of red); '"`UNIQ--templatestyles-0000000A-QINU`"' basaltic andesite; '"`UNIQ--templatestyles-0000000B-QINU`"' rhyolite (ignimbrite is lighter shades of violet); '"`UNIQ--templatestyles-0000000C-QINU`"' plutonic; White shading is selected caldera features.; Clicking on the rectangle icon enables full window and mouse-over with volcano name/wikilink and ages before present.
- Location: North Island, New Zealand

Geology
- Mountain type: Lava domes
- Last eruption: 100,000 years

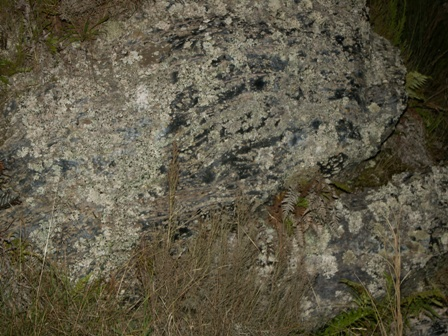
Obsidian boulders at Ben Lomond

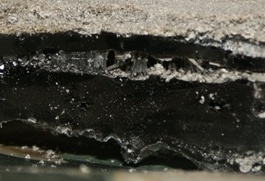
Obsidian specimen fallen from cliff

Ben Lomond is a rhyolite lava dome near Lake Taupō in New Zealand's North Island. Located about eight kilometres north-northeast of Kinloch, it rises to a height of 744 metres above sea level.

Ben Lomond erupted about 100,000 years ago, producing two lava lobes that flowed around 3.5 kilometres south and southwest from a vent about one kilometre south of Poihipi Road. Much of the lava formed grey banded obsidian as it cooled. Crystalline rhyolite and pumice were also produced.
