= Cinnamon Butte =

Volcanic geological formation in Oregon

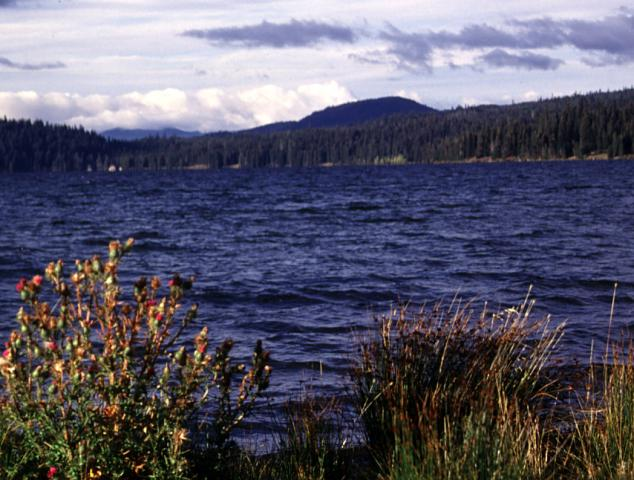

Highest point
- Elevation: 6,427 ft (1,959 m) NAVD 88
- Coordinates: 43°14′28″N 122°06′35″W

Geography
- Location: Douglas County, Oregon, U.S.
- Parent range: Cascades
- Topo map: USGS Mount Thielsen

Geology
- Formed by: Subduction zone volcanism
- Rock age: Holocene?
- Mountain type(s): Cinder cone, lava dome, volcanic field
- Volcanic arc: Cascade Volcanic Arc
- Last eruption: More than 6845 years ago

Cinnamon Butte is a group of cinder cone volcanoes and lava domes in the Cascade Range of Oregon. All of the vents are older than approximately 6,845 years as they are all covered in ash from the eruption of Mount Mazama.

== Notable Vents ==
Name	Elevation	Coordinates
Cinnamon Butte	6,427 ft (1,959 m)	43°14′27″N 122°06′35″W
Kelsay Point	4,918 ft (1,499 m)	43°18′01″N 122°06′27″W
Mule Peak	6,840 ft (2,080 m)	43°17′37″N 122°00′33″W
Red Cinder Butte	6,545 ft (1,995 m)	43°16′20″N 122°03′38″W
Thirsty Point	5,942 ft (1,811 m)	43°16′28″N 122°05′35″W
Tenas Peak	6,532 ft (1,991 m)	43°19′27″N 122°02′09″W

== See also ==
- List of volcanoes in the United States of America
- Cascade Volcanoes
