= Mount Hokuchin =

Lava dome in the Daisetsuzan volcanic group on the island of Hokkaido, Japan

- 北鎮岳
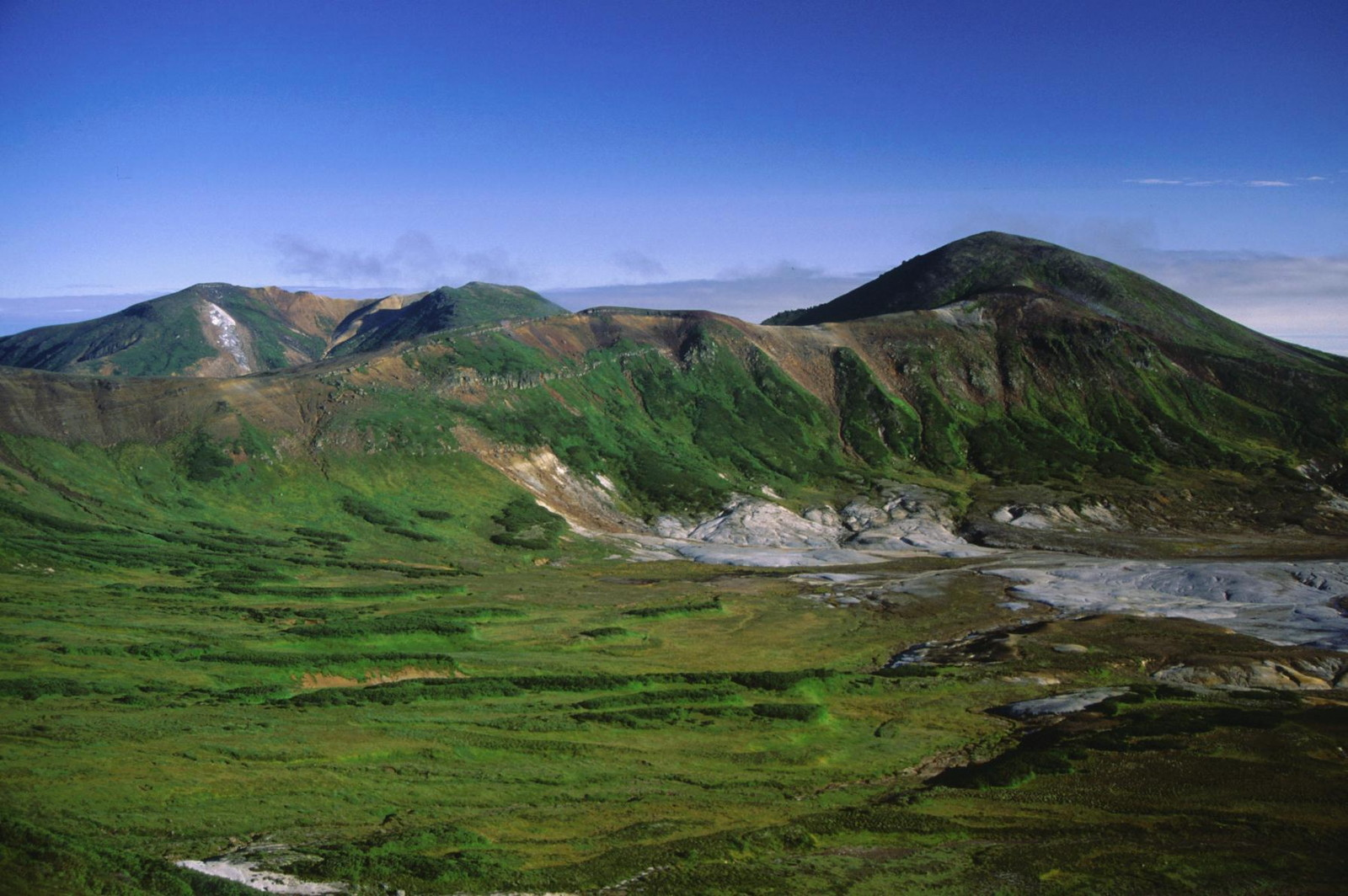
- Mount Hippu and Mount Hokuchin (right)

Highest point
- Elevation: 2,244 m (7,362 ft)
- Listing: List of mountains and hills of Japan by height
- Coordinates: 43°41′34″N 142°52′47″E

Geography
- Location within Japan Location within Hokkaido
- Location: Hokkaido, Japan
- Parent range: Daisetsuzan Volcanic Group
- Topo map(s): Geographical Survey Institute 25000:1 層雲峡; 25000:1 愛山溪温泉; 50000:1 大雪山

Geology
- Mountain type: lava dome
- Volcanic arc: Kurile Arc

Mount Hokuchin (北鎮岳, Hokuchin-dake) is a lava dome located in the Daisetsuzan Volcanic Group of the Ishikari Mountains, Hokkaido, Japan.

== See also ==
- List of volcanoes in Japan
- List of mountains in Japan
