= Mount Hakuun =

Lava dome located in the Ishikari mountains on the island of Hokkaido, Japan

- 白雲岳
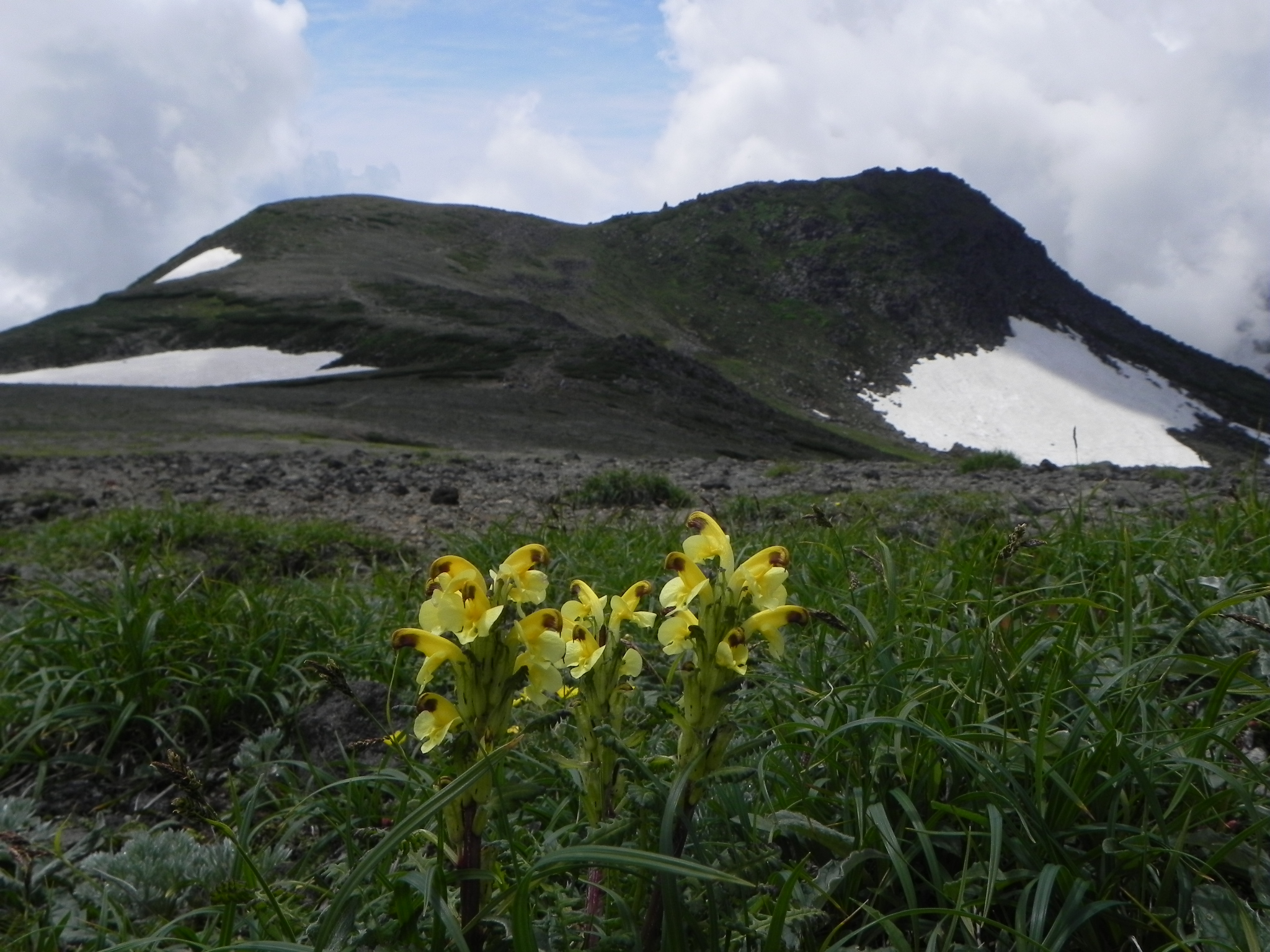

Highest point
- Elevation: 2,230.0 m (7,316.3 ft)
- Prominence: 180 m (590 ft)
- Parent peak: Mount Asahi
- Listing: List of mountains and hills of Japan by height
- Coordinates: 43°39′40″N 142°54′21″E

Naming
- English translation: white clouds mountain
- Language of name: Japanese

Geography
- Location within Japan Location within Hokkaido
- Location: Hokkaidō, Japan
- Parent range: Daisetsuzan Volcanic Group
- Topo map(s): Geographical Survey Institute 25000:1 白雲岳; 25000:1 層雲峡; 50000:1 大雪山; 50000:1 旭岳

Geology
- Mountain type: lava dome
- Volcanic arc: Kurile Arc

Mount Hakuun (白雲岳, Hakuun-dake) is a lava dome located in the Daisetsuzan Volcanic Group of the Ishikari Mountains, Hokkaidō, Japan.

== See also ==
- List of volcanoes in Japan
- List of mountains in Japan
