= Daisetsuzan Volcanic Group =

Volcanic group on the island of Hokkaido

- Nutapukaushipe or Nutaku Kamushupe
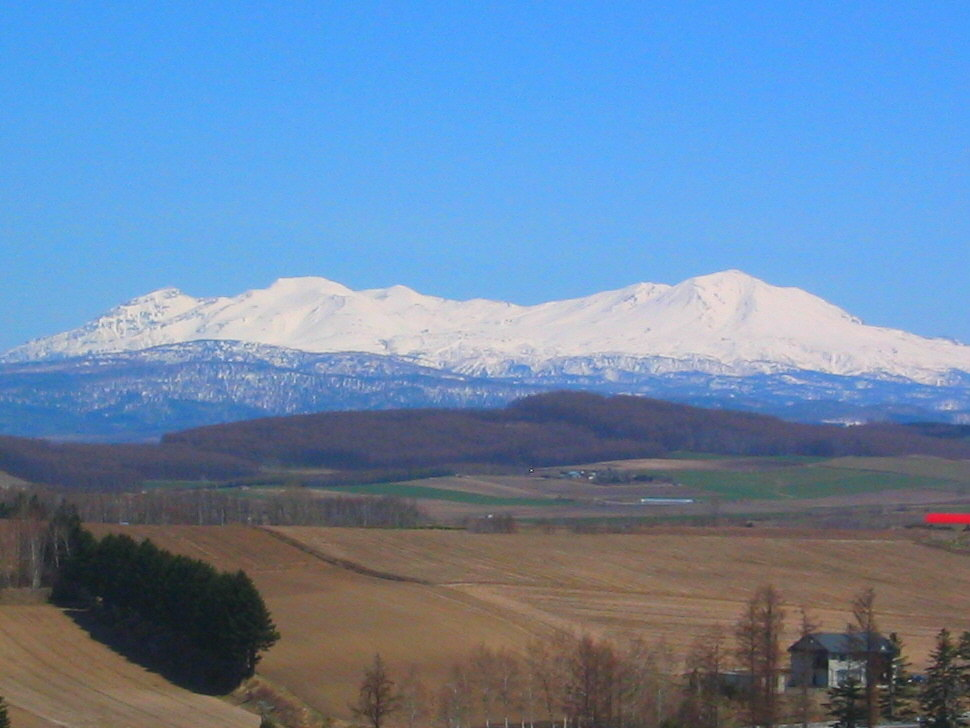
- A view from Biei town

Highest point
- Peak: Mount Asahi
- Elevation: 2,290 m (7,510 ft)
- Coordinates: 43°39′N 142°51′E

Naming
- Etymology: big snowy mountains
- Native name: 大雪山系 (Japanese); Daisetsu-sankei (Japanese)

Geography
- Location within Japan Location within Hokkaido
- Country: Japan
- State: Hokkaidō
- Region: Kamikawa Subprefecture
- Parent range: Ishikari Mountains
- Biome: alpine climate

Geology
- Orogeny: island arc
- Rock age: Quaternary
- Rock type: volcanic
- Last eruption: AD 1739 or later

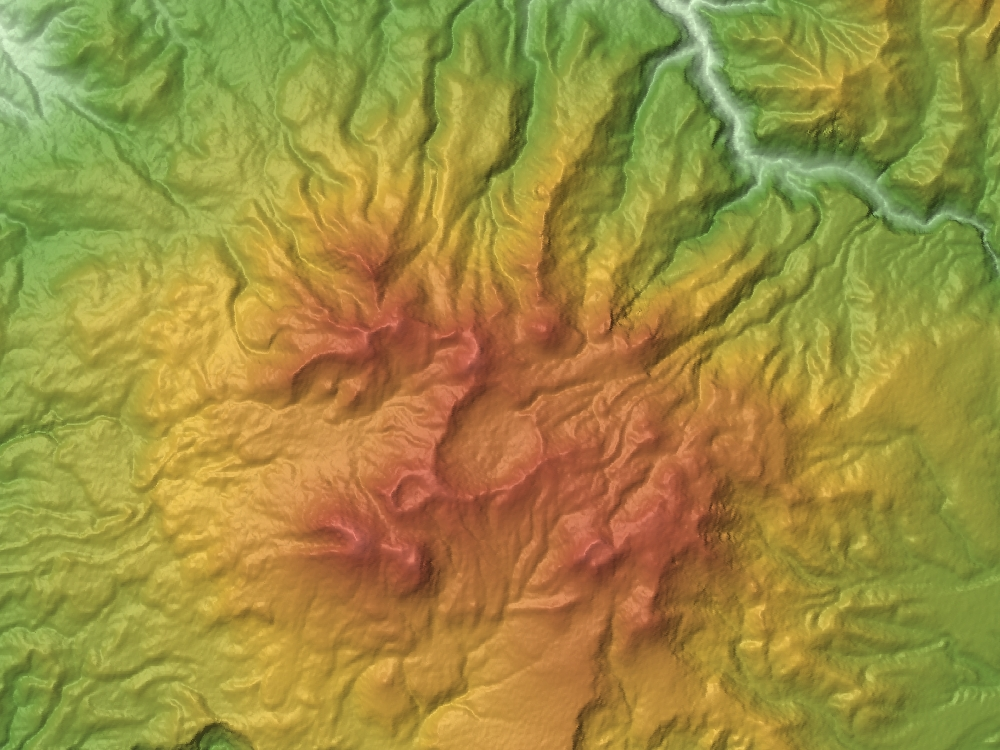
Taisetsu Volcano Group

The Daisetsuzan Volcanic Group (大雪山系, Daisetsu-sankei; also called Taisetsu-zan) is a volcanic group of peaks arranged around the 2 kilometres (1.2 mi) wide Ohachi-Daira (御鉢平, Ohachi-daira) caldera in Hokkaidō, Japan. In the Ainu language it is known as Nutapukaushipe (which means "the mountain above the river"), Nutaku Kamushupe, or Optateske. These peaks are the highest in Hokkaidō. The group lends its name to the Daisetsuzan National Park in which the volcanic group is located.

== Geography ==
The volcanic group lies at the north end of the Daisetsu-Tokachi graben on the Kurile arc of the Ring of Fire. The volcanic zone makes itself known through a number of fumaroles and natural hot springs.

== List of mountains by height ==
The following peaks make up the volcanic group:

Name	Height	Type
Mount Asahi (旭岳, Asahi-dake)	2,290 metres (7,510 ft)	stratovolcano
Mount Hokuchin (北鎮岳, Hokuchin-dake)	2,244 metres (7,362 ft)	lava dome
Mount Hakuun (白雲岳, Hakuun-dake)	2,230.0 metres (7,316.3 ft)	lava dome
Mount Kuma (熊ヶ岳, Kuma-ga-dake)	2,210 metres (7,250 ft)	stratovolcano
Mount Pippu (比布岳, Pippu-dake)	2,197 metres (7,208 ft)	volcanic
Mount Mamiya (間宮岳, Mamiya-dake)	2,185 metres (7,169 ft)	caldera rim
Mount Koizumi (小泉岳, Koizumi-dake)	2,158 metres (7,080 ft)	stratovolcano
Mount Hokkai (北海岳, Hokkai-dake)	2,149 metres (7,051 ft)	caldera rim
Mount Nokogiri (鋸岳, Nokogiri-dake)	2,142 metres (7,028 ft)	volcanic
Mount Matsuda (松田岳, Matsuda-dake)	2,136 metres (7,008 ft)	caldera rim
Mount Ryōun (凌雲岳, Ryōun-dake)	2,125 metres (6,972 ft)	lava dome
Mount Naka (中岳, Naka-dake)	2,113 metres (6,932 ft)	caldera rim
Mount Aibetsu (愛別岳, Aibetsu-dake)	2,112.7 metres (6,931 ft)	volcanic
Mount Aka (赤岳, Aka-dake)	2,078.5 metres (6,819 ft)	stratovolcano
Mount Eboshi (烏帽子岳, Eboshi-dake)	2,072 metres (6,798 ft)	stratovolcano
Mount Goshiki (五色岳, Goshiki-dake)	2,038 metres (6,686 ft)	-
Mount Midori (緑岳, Midori-dake)	2,019.9 metres (6,627 ft)	-
Mount Kuro (黒岳, Kuro-dake)	1,984.3 metres (6,510 ft)	lava dome
Mount Nagayama (永山岳, Nagayama-dake)	1,978 metres (6,490 ft)	stratovolcano
Mount Keigetsu (桂月岳, Keigetsu-dake)	1,938 metres (6,358 ft)	lava dome

== See also ==
- 100 Soundscapes of Japan
- Tourism in Japan
- List of volcanoes in Japan
