= Ishikari Mountains =

Mountain range in Hokkaido, Japan

- ishikari or ishokarappet
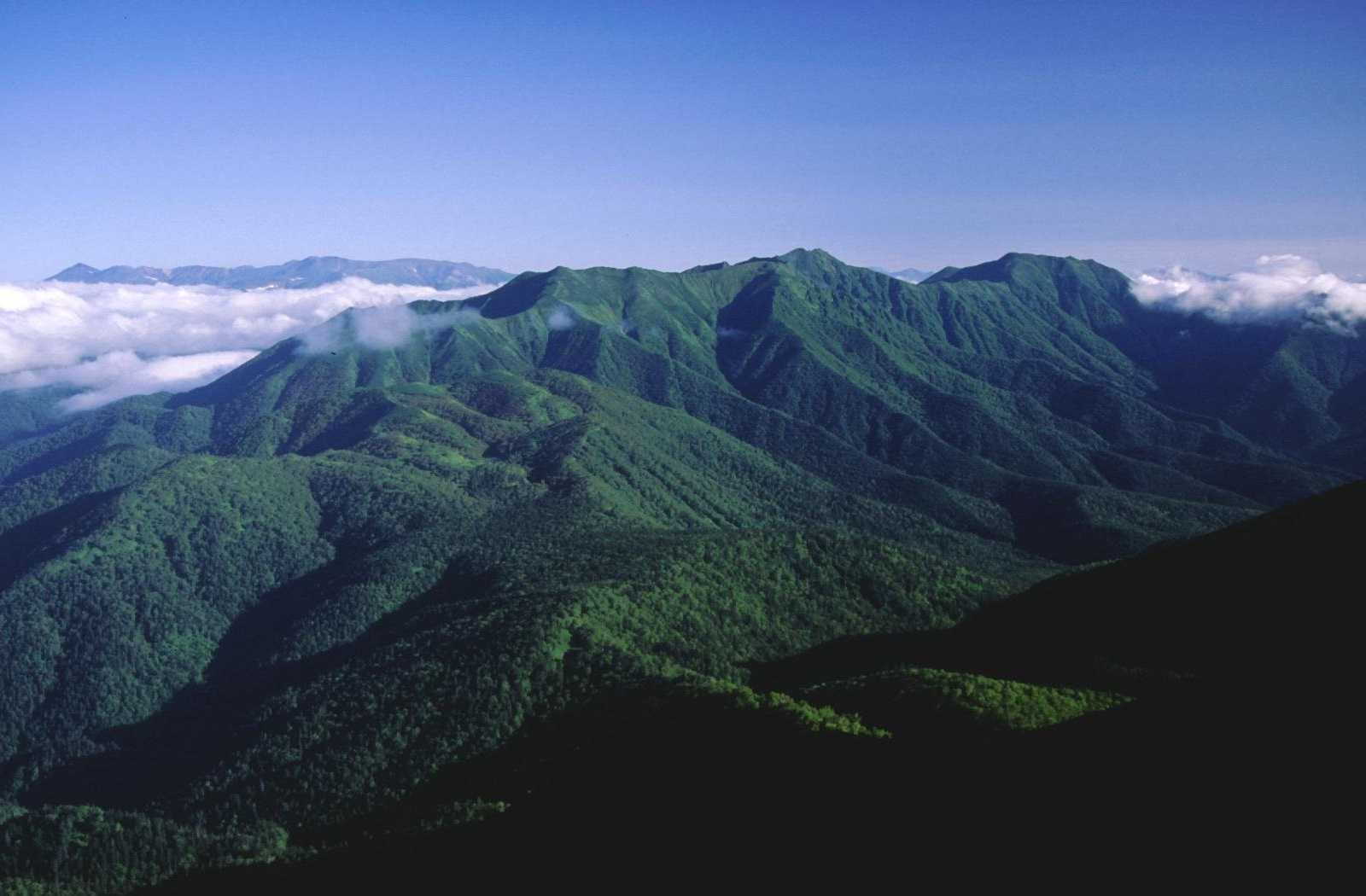
- Mount Ishikari from Mount Nipesotsu

Highest point
- Peak: Mount Asahi
- Elevation: 2,290 m (7,510 ft)
- Coordinates: 43°30′N 143°0′E

Naming
- Native name: 石狩山地 (Japanese); Ishikari Sanchi (Japanese)

Geography
- Location within Japan Location within Hokkaido
- Country: Japan
- State: Hokkaidō
- Volcanic groups: Daisetsuzan Volcanic Group and Tomuraushi Volcanic Group
- Biome: alpine climate

Geology
- Orogeny: island arc
- Rock age: Quaternary
- Rock type: volcanic

The Ishikari Mountains (石狩山地, Ishikari Sanchi) is a range of volcanic mountains in central Hokkaidō, Japan. The mountain range is made up from the Daisetsuzan Volcanic Group and the Tomuraushi Volcanic Group. The volcanoes are part of the Kurile arc of the Ring of Fire. The mountains are also referred to as Kamui Mintara which is an Ainu name meaning “the playground of the gods”.

== Hiking routes ==
There are a number of hiking routes in the Ishikari Mountains, including the Asahidake to Kurodake traverse, the Daisetsuzan Grand Traverse, and the trails around Mount Tokachi.

== Flora and fauna ==
Trees found in the Ishikari mountains includes Jezo spruce, Erman’s birch, and Dwarf Stone pine. Flowers found in the area include yellow-flowered rhododendron, blue heath, and wedgeleaf primrose.
