= Geospatial Information Authority of Japan =

Institution responsible for surveying and mapping the national land of Japan

- 国土地理院; Kokudo Chiri-in
- Geospatial Information Authority of Japan logo

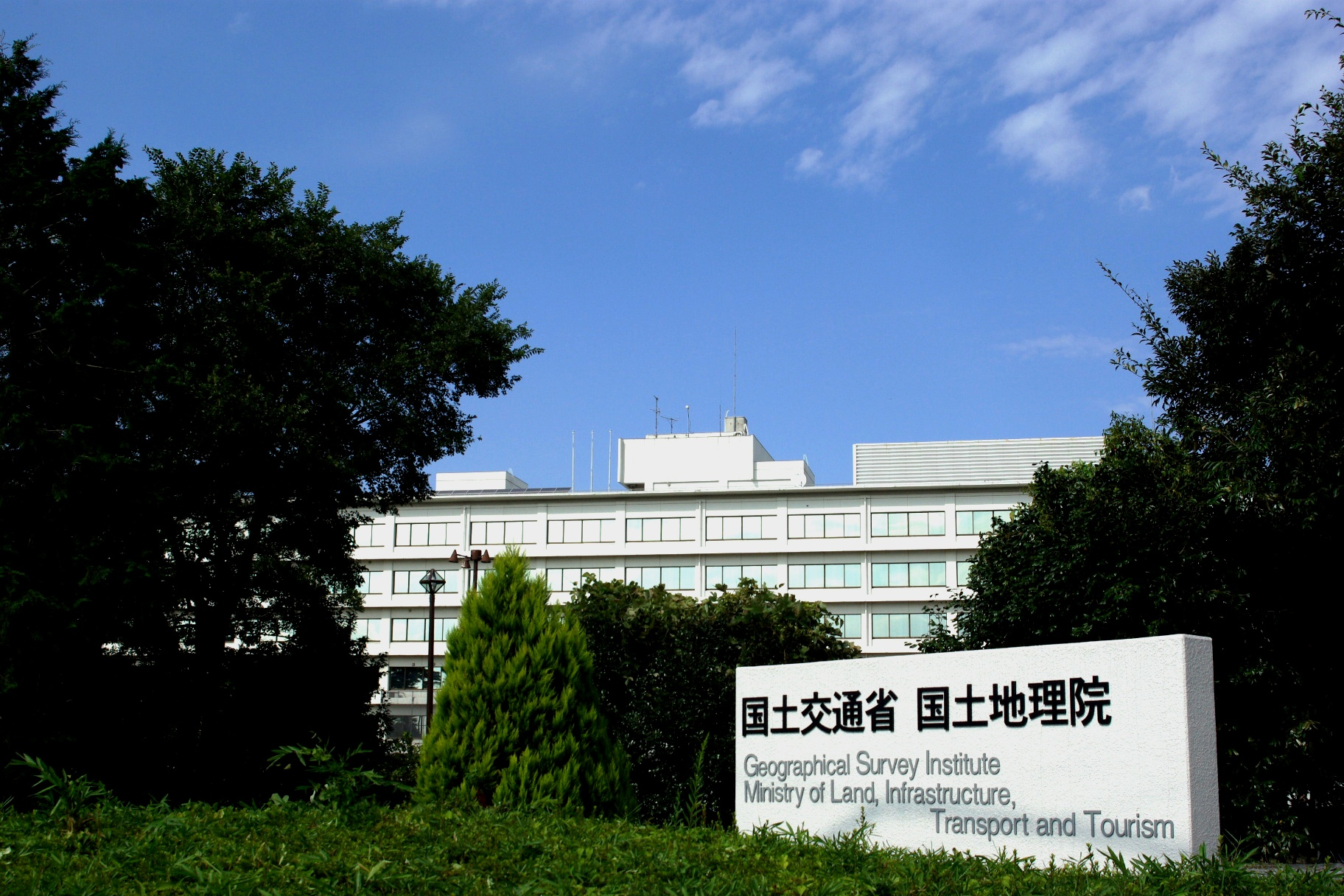
- Geospatial Information Authority of Japan headquarters

Agency overview
- Formed: June 2, 1869; 157 years ago
- Preceding agency: Ministry of Popular Affairs
- Jurisdiction: Japan
- Headquarters: Yubinbango 305-0811, Ibaraki Prefecture, Tsukuba City, Kitago No. 1, Japan
- Employees: 671 civilian staff (2018)
- Annual budget: 9,640,335 thousand yen
- Agency executive: Hiroshi Murakami, Dean
- Parent agency: Ministry of Land, Infrastructure and Transport
- Website: www.gsi.go.jp

The Geospatial Information Authority of Japan (国土地理院, Kokudo Chiri-in), or GSI, is the national institution responsible for surveying and mapping the national land of Japan. The former name of the organization from 1949 until March 2010 was Geographical Survey Institute; despite the rename, it retains the same initials. It is an extraordinary organ of the Ministry of Land, Infrastructure, Transport and Tourism. Its main offices are situated in Tsukuba City of Ibaraki Prefecture.

It also runs a museum, situated in Tsukuba, the Science Museum of Map and Survey.

== Earthquake precursor prediction research ==
Stationary MT monitoring systems have been installed in Japan since April 1996, providing a continuous recording of MT signals at the Mizusawa Geodetic Observatory and the Esashi Station of the GSI. These stations measure fluctuations in the earth's electromagnetic field that correspond with seismic activity. The raw geophysical time-series data from these monitoring stations is freely available to the scientific community, enabling further study of the interaction between EM events and earthquake activity. The MT time series data from the GSIJ earthquake monitoring stations is available online at http://vldb.gsi.go.jp/sokuchi/geomag/menu_03/mt_data.html

The Authority is represented on the national Coordinating Committee for Earthquake Prediction.

== Japanese water height reference point ==
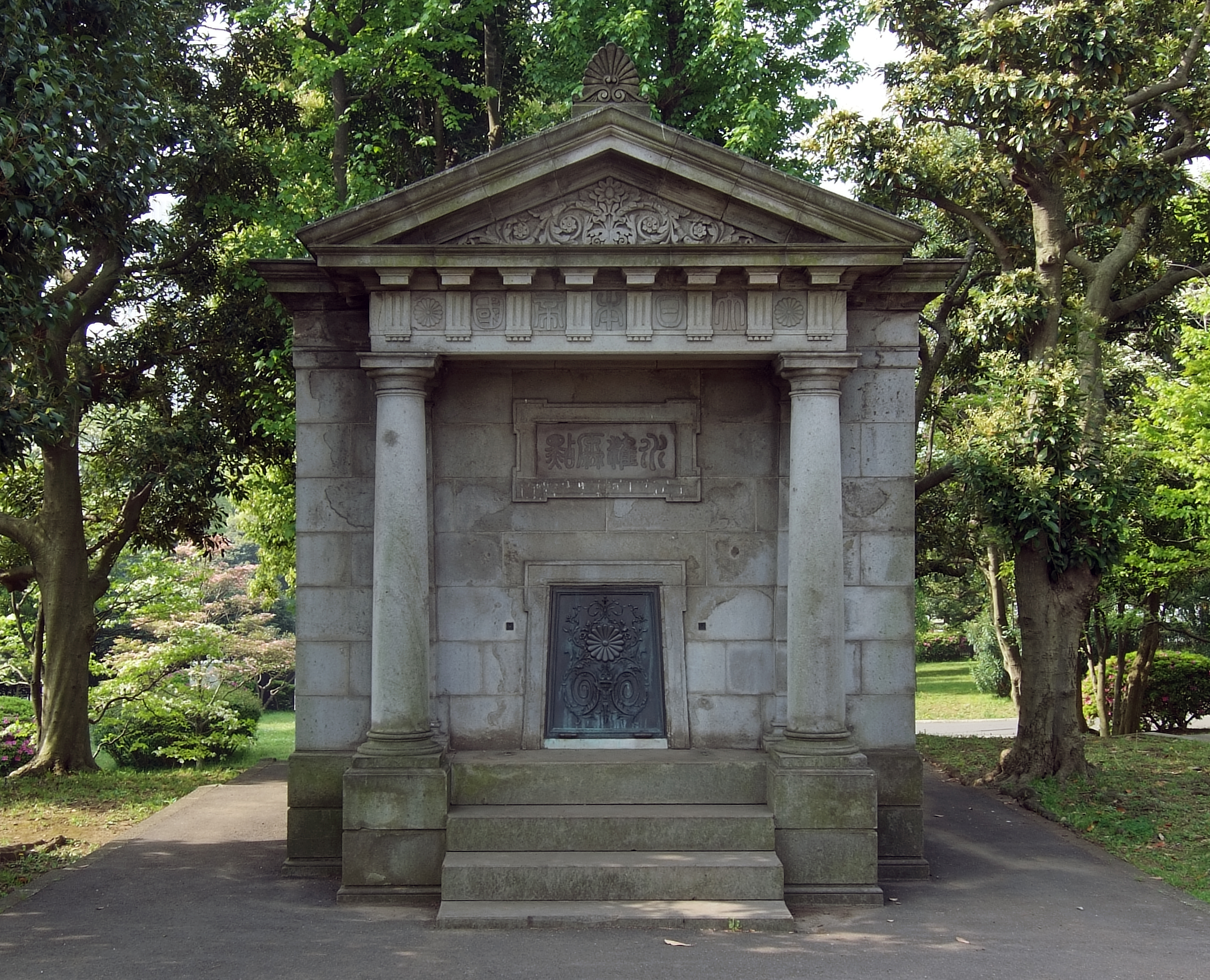
The Japanese water height reference point storehouse (日本水準原点庫, Nihon Suijun Genten Hyoko)

The Japanese water height reference point (日本水準原点, Nihon Suijun Genten) is installed in a small building in front of the National Diet Building in Nagatacho Chiyoda, Tokyo. The building is called the Japanese water height reference point storehouse (日本水準原点庫, Nihon Suijun Genten Hyoko). Construction of the building started in August 1890 and it was completed on December 24, 1891. It serves as a reference point for elevations in Japan (vertical datum). The building cannot be entered, but there is a stele with a description for its history at the right.

Elevations of Japan are determined with reference to the mean sea level of Tokyo Bay (elevation 0 m). This is called mean sea level of Tokyo Bay (東京湾平均海面, Tōkyō-wan heikin kaimen) or Tokyo Peil (TP for short, "Tokyo level"), where the word Peil comes from the Dutch language. The stone base monument of the datum has a crystal scale with a 0 which indicates 24.3900 m (80.020 ft) above the mean sea level of Tokyo Bay since October 21, 2011.

Since it is difficult to refer to the altitude in Tokyo for remote islands, 37 islands have their own zero point. The heights of Okinawa z. B. are measured from the middle water level of Nakagusuku Bay and that of Miyake from the Ako Bay.

== The GSI in fiction ==
The GSI featured in the novel Norwegian Wood by Haruki Murakami as the intended workplace of his roommate, "stormtrooper". At the time the novel was set, in the late sixties, the GSI was situated in Tokyo.

== See also ==
- Japanese maps, the history of mapping in Japan.
- Japanese map symbols, the official symbols used by the GSI in maps.
- Global Map
