= Kami-Furano Station =

Railway station in Kamifurano, Hokkaido, Japan

F39 Kami-Furano Station 上富良野駅
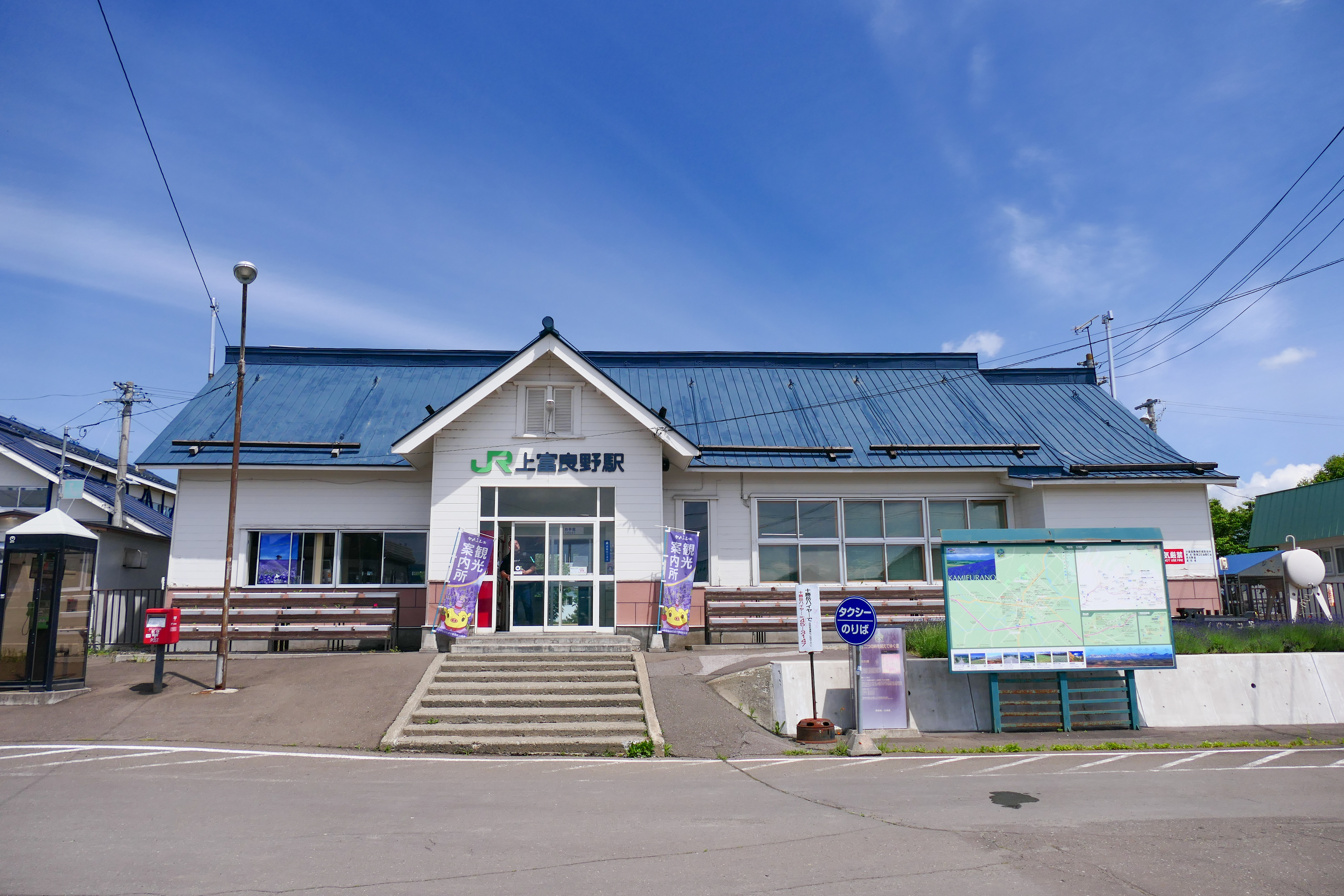
- Kami-Furano Station in June 2022

General information
- Location: 1, Nakamachi 1-chome, Kamifurano; Hokkaido Prefecture; Japan
- Coordinates: 43°27′50.81″N 142°28′7.56″E
- System: JR Hokkaido commuter rail station
- Owner: JR Hokkaido
- Operator: JR Hokkaido
- Line: Furano Line
- Distance: 39.7 km (24.7 miles) from Asahikawa
- Platforms: 2 side platforms
- Tracks: 2

Other information
- Station code: F39
- Website: Official webcite

History
- Opened: 15 November 1899; 126 years ago

Services
Preceding station	JR Hokkaido	Following station
Bibaushi F38 towards Asahikawa	Furano Line	Nishinaka F41 towards Furano
Location
- Location within Hokkaido Location within Japan

Kami-Furano Station (上富良野駅, Kami-Furano-eki) is a railway station on the Furano Line in Kamifurano, Hokkaido, Japan, operated by the Hokkaido Railway Company (JR Hokkaido).

== Lines ==
Kami-Furano Station is served by the Furano Line, and is numbered "F39". Only all-stations "Local" train services stop at this station.

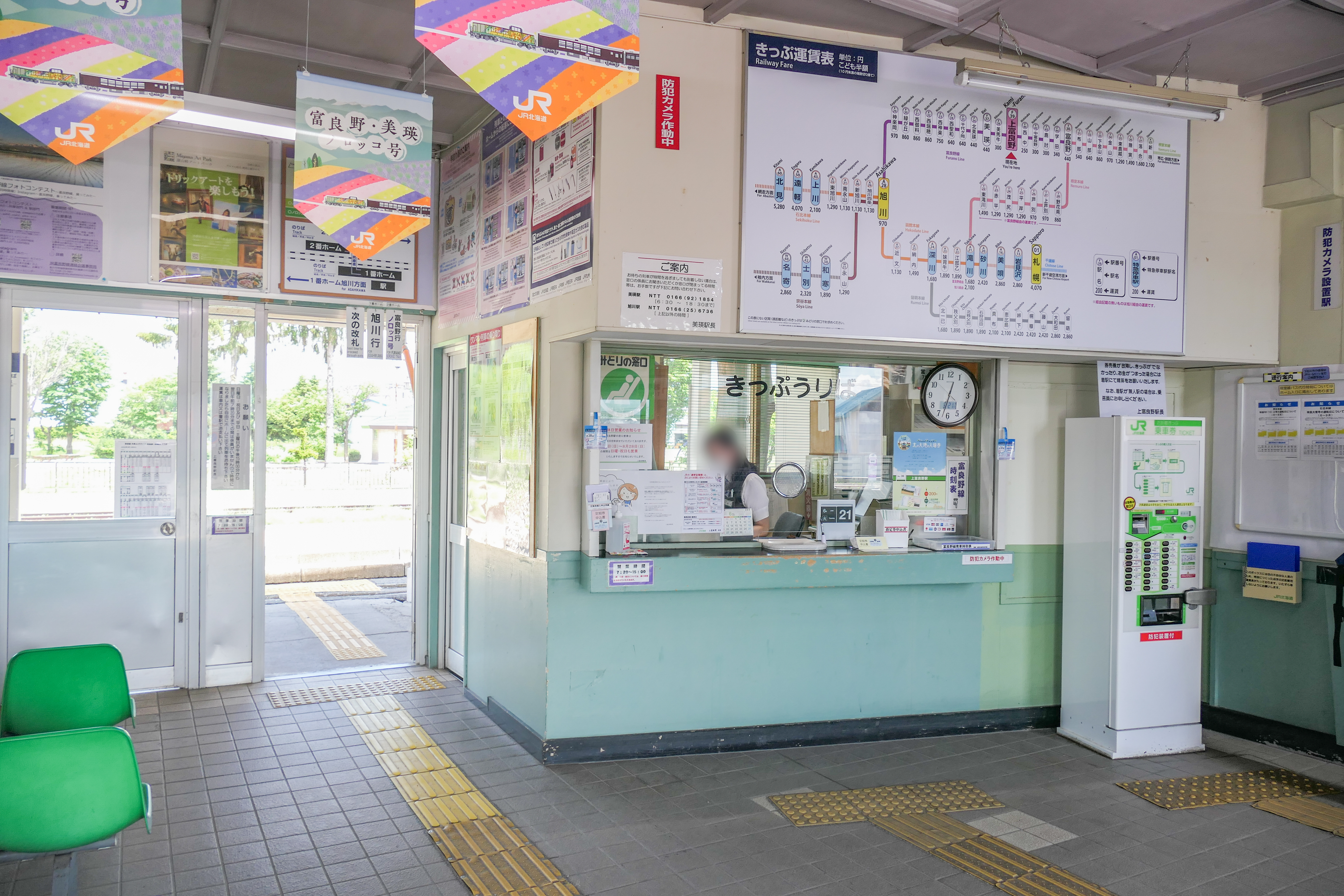
Ticket gate in June 2022

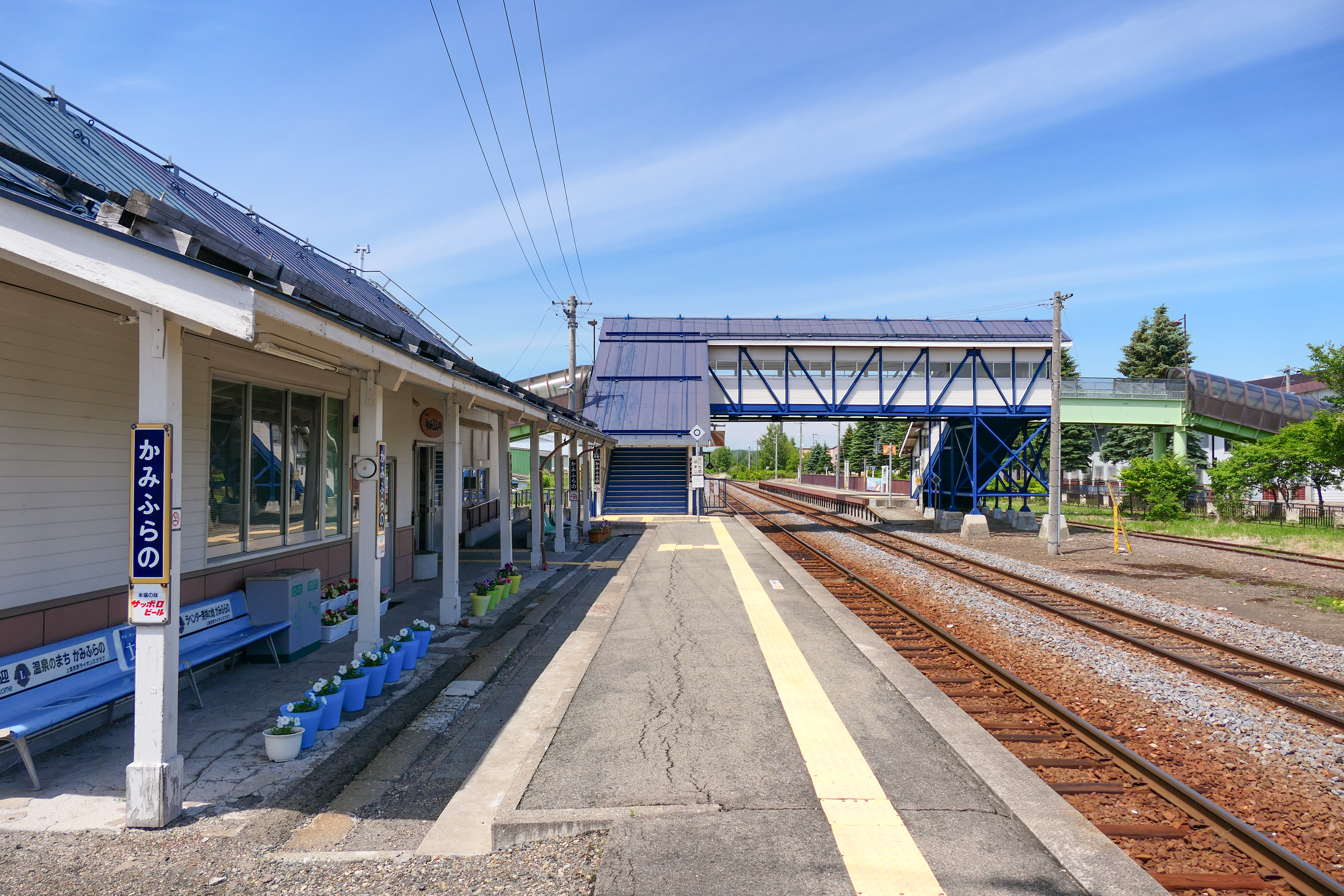
Platform 1 in June 2022

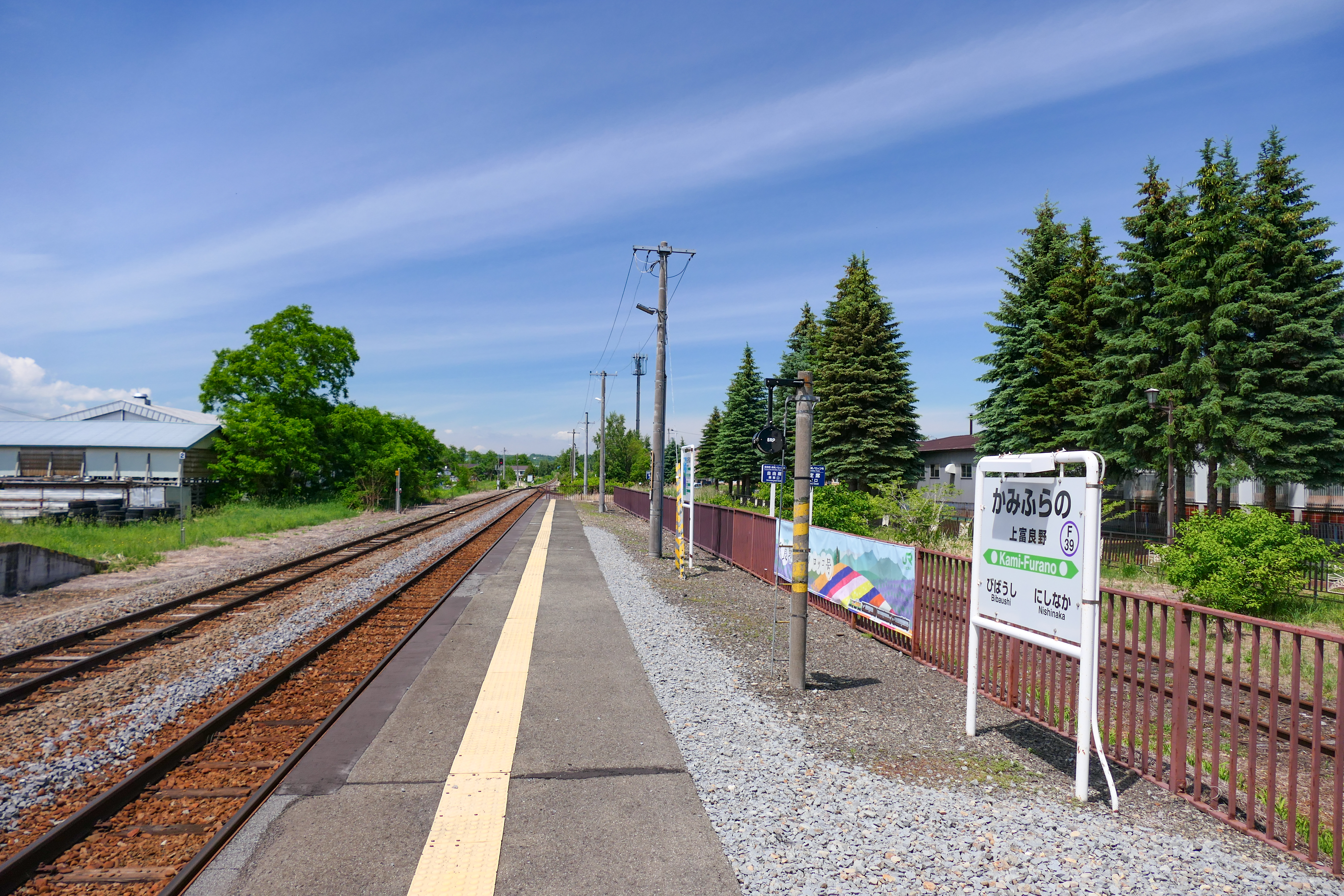
Platform 2 in June 2022

== History ==
The station opened on 15 November 1899. With the privatization of Japanese National Railways (JNR) on 1 April 1987, the station came under the control of JR Hokkaido.

== Surrounding area ==
- Route 237
- JGSDF Camp Kami-Furano

== See also ==
- List of railway stations in Japan
