= Midorigaoka Station (Hokkaido) =

Railway station in Asahikawa, Hokkaido, Japan

F30 Midorigaoka 緑が丘駅
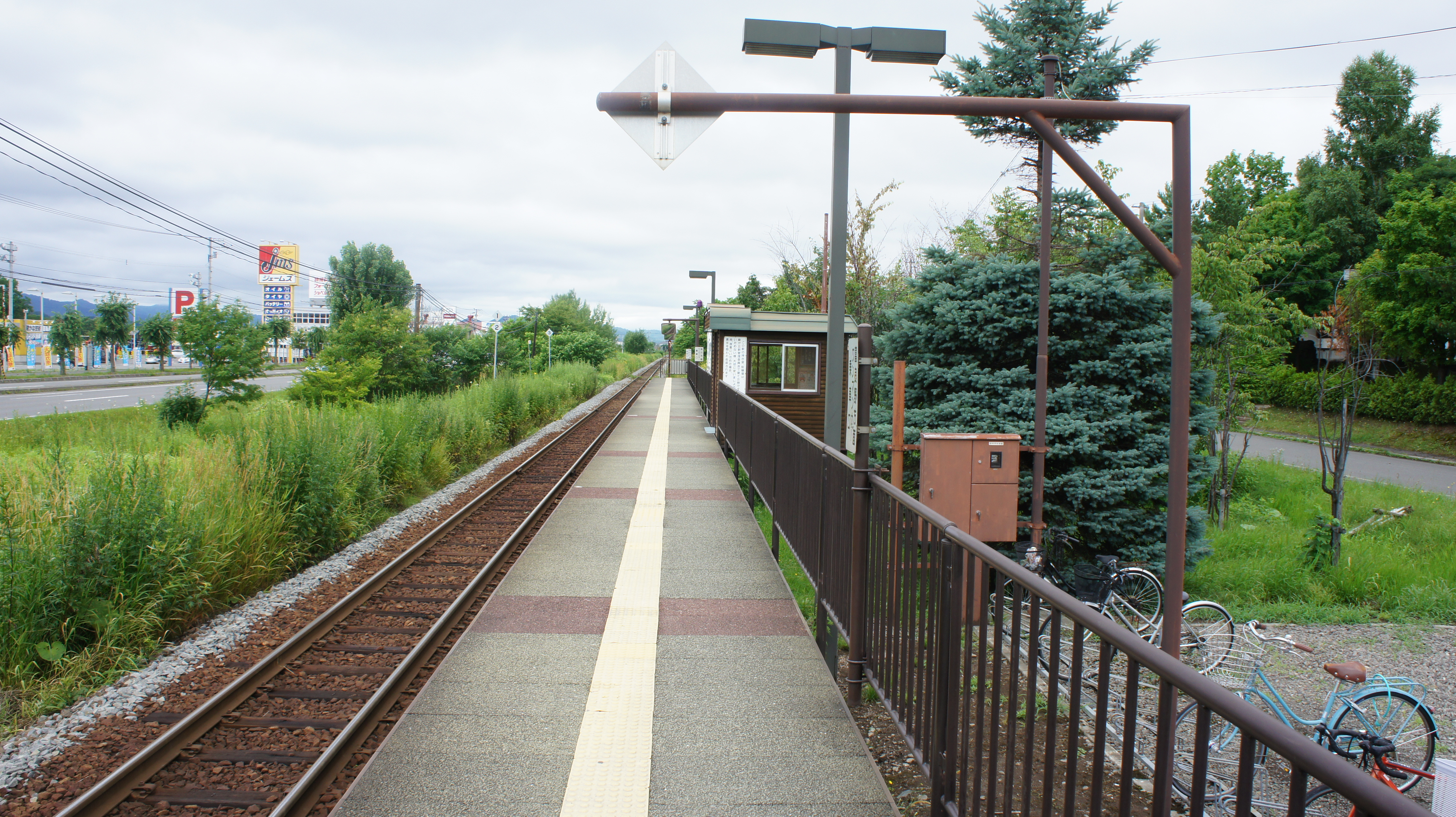
- Midorigaoka Station

General information
- Location: Kaguraoka 13-jo 9-chome, Asahikawa; Hokkaido Prefecture; Japan
- Coordinates: 43°43′52″N 142°21′57″E
- System: JR Hokkaido commuter rail station
- Owner: JR Hokkaido
- Operator: JR Hokkaido
- Line: Furano Line
- Distance: 4.0 km (2.5 miles) from Asahikawa
- Platforms: 1 side platform
- Tracks: 1
- Bus stands: yes

Construction
- Structure type: At grade
- Accessible: None

Other information
- Station code: F30
- Website: Official website

History
- Opened: 1 September 1996; 29 years ago

Services
Preceding station	JR Hokkaido	Following station
Kaguraoka F29 towards Asahikawa	Furano Line	Nishi-Goryō F31 towards Furano
Location
- Location within Hokkaido Location within Japan

Midorigaoka Station (緑が丘駅, Midorigaoka-eki) is a train station located in Asahikawa, Hokkaidō, Japan. It is operated by the Hokkaido Railway Company. Only local trains stop. The station is assigned station number F30.

== Lines serviced ==
- Furano Line

== Surrounding Area ==
- Route 237
- Asahikawa Medical University and Hospital
