= Kaguraoka Station =

Railway station in Asahikawa, Hokkaido, Japan

F29 Kaguraoka 神楽岡駅
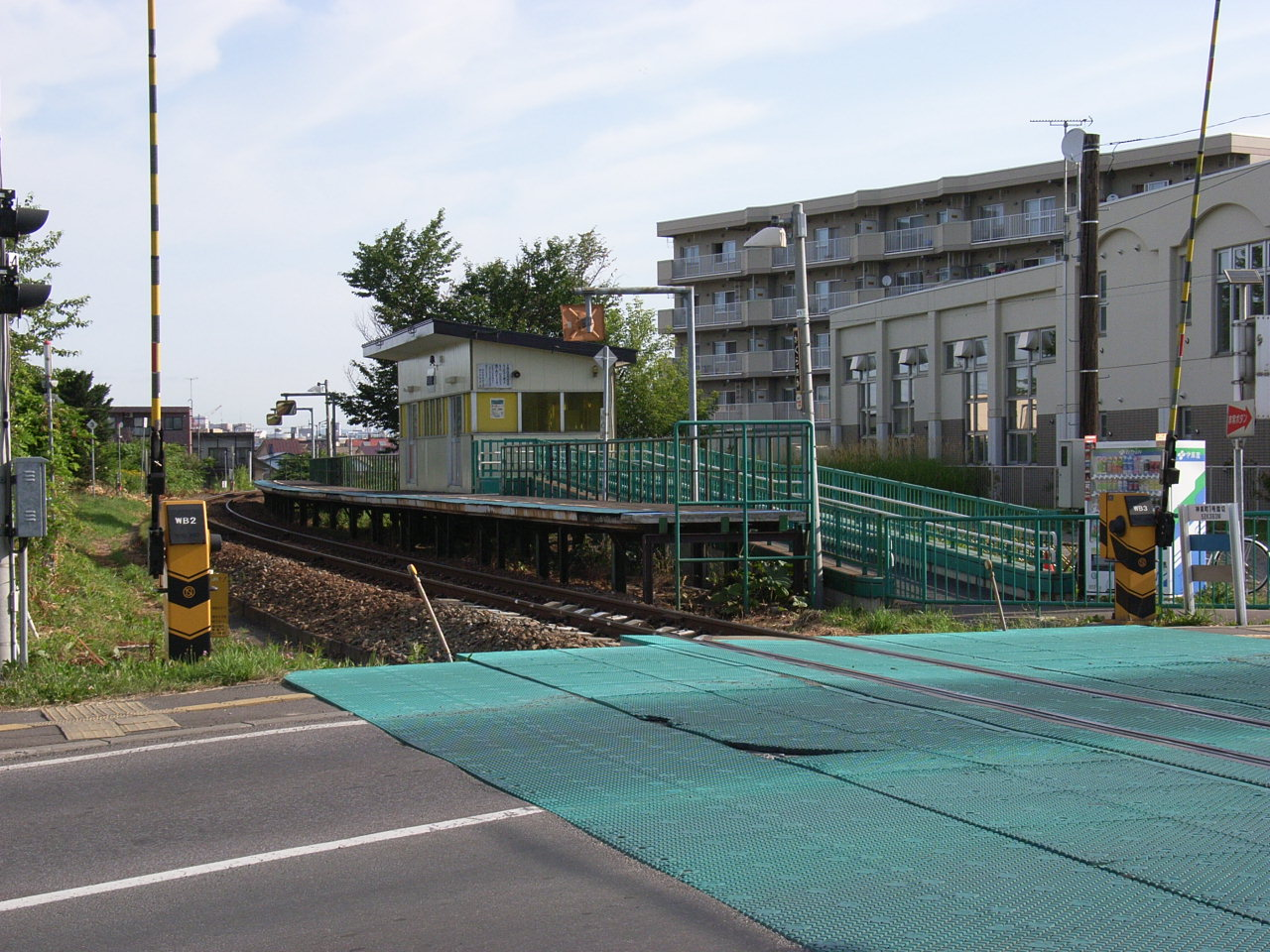
- Kaguraoka Station

General information
- Location: Kagura 4-jo 14-chome, Asahikawa; Hokkaido Prefecture; Japan
- Coordinates: 43°44′41.5″N 142°21′30.1″E
- System: JR Hokkaido commuter rail station
- Owner: JR Hokkaido
- Operator: JR Hokkaido
- Line: Furano Line
- Distance: 2.4 km (1.5 miles) from Asahikawa
- Platforms: 1 side platform
- Tracks: 1
- Bus stands: yes

Construction
- Structure type: At grade
- Accessible: None

Other information
- Station code: F29
- Website: Official website

History
- Opened: 25 March 1958; 68 years ago

Services
| Preceding station | JR Hokkaido | Following station |
|---|---|---|
| Asahikawa A28 Terminus | Furano Line | Midorigaoka F30 towards Furano |
Location
- Location within Hokkaido Location within Japan

Kaguraoka Station (神楽岡駅, Kaguraoka-eki) is a train station located in Asahikawa, Hokkaidō, Japan. It is operated by the Hokkaido Railway Company. Only local trains stop. The station is assigned station number F29.

== Lines serviced ==
- Furano Line

== Surrounding Area ==
- Route 237
