= Bibaushi Station =

Railway station in Biei, Hokkaido, Japan

F38 Bibaushi Station 美馬牛駅
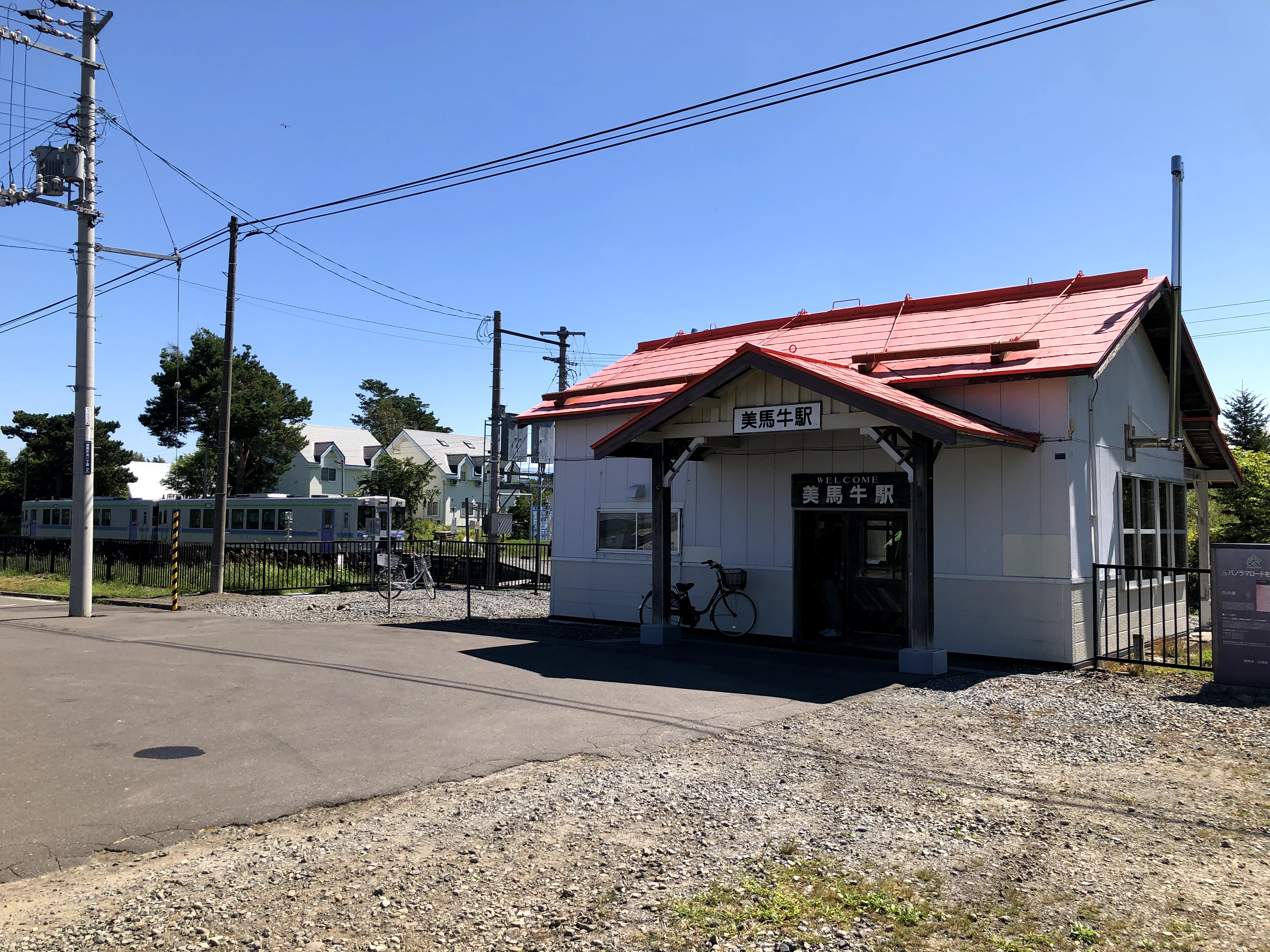
- Bibaushi Station in August 2020

General information
- Location: 3-1 Bibaushi-kita 1-chome, Biei; Hokkaido; Japan
- Coordinates: 43°32′14.71″N 142°26′49.79″E
- System: JR Hokkaido commuter rail station
- Operator: JR Hokkaido
- Line: Furano Line
- Distance: 30.6 km (19.0 miles) from Asahikawa
- Platforms: 2 side platforms
- Tracks: 2

Construction
- Structure type: At grade

Other information
- Status: Unstaffed
- Station code: F38
- Website: Official webcite

History
- Opened: 10 September 1926; 100 years ago

Passengers
- 2014: 18 daily

Services
Preceding station	JR Hokkaido	Following station
Biei F37 towards Asahikawa	Furano Line	Kami-Furano F39 towards Furano
Location
- Location within Hokkaido Location within Japan

Bibaushi Station (美馬牛駅, Bibaushi-eki) is a train station located in Biei, Hokkaidō, Japan. It is operated by the Hokkaido Railway Company. Only local trains stop. The station is assigned the station number F38.

== Surrounding Area ==
- Route 237

== Lines serviced ==
- Furano Line
