= Chiyogaoka Station =

Railway station in Asahikawa, Hokkaido, Japan

Coordinates: 43.6439°N 142.4510°E

F35 Chiyogaoka Station 千代ヶ岡駅
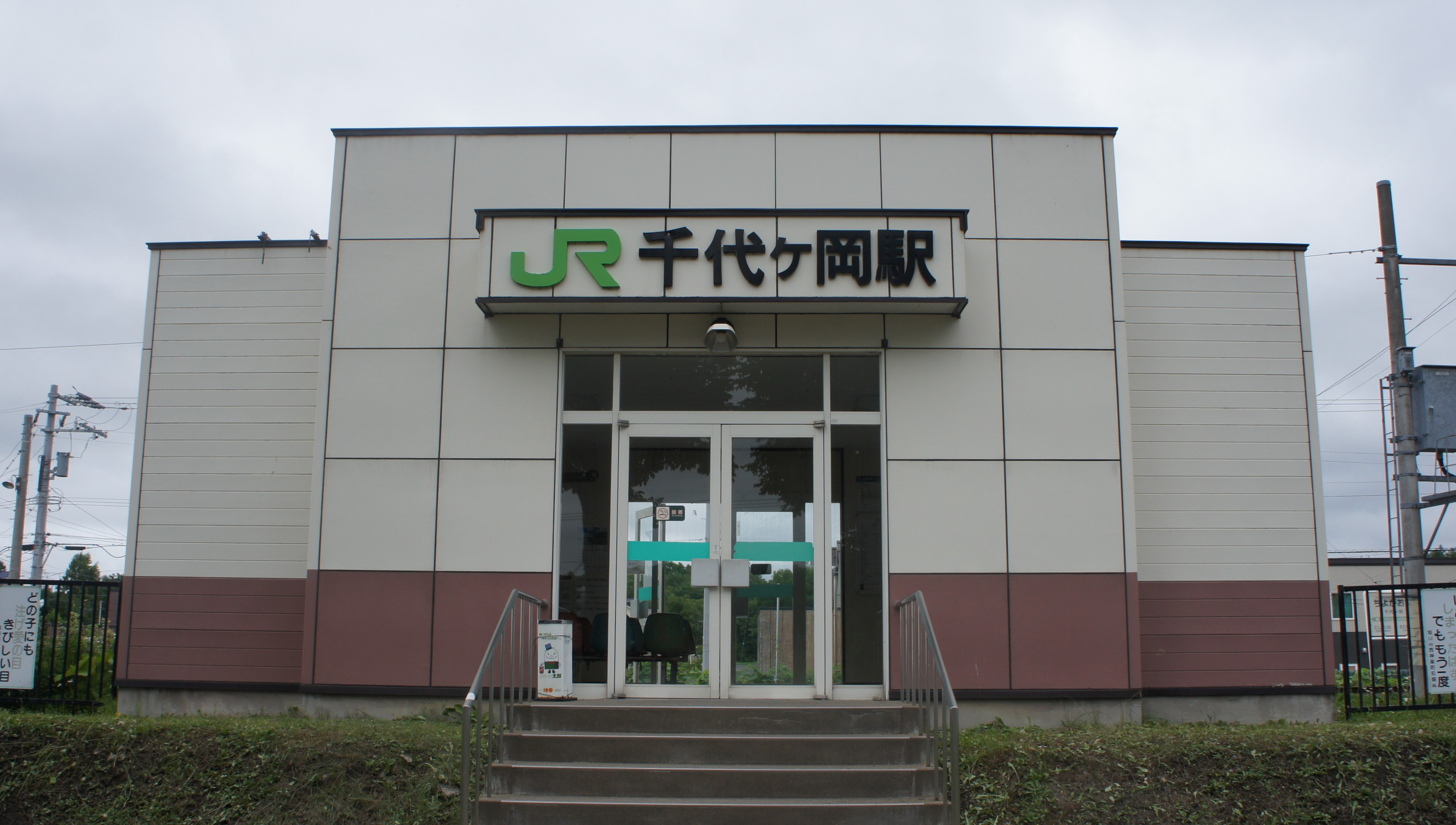
- JR Furano-Line Chiyogaoka Station building

General information
- Location: 1-24 Nishikagura, Asahikawa; Hokkaido Prefecture; Japan
- System: JR Hokkaido commuter rail station
- Platforms: 2 side platforms
- Tracks: 2

Construction
- Structure type: At grade

Other information
- Station code: F35

History
- Opened: 10 September 1936; 89 years ago

Services
Preceding station	JR Hokkaido	Following station
Nishi-Seiwa F34 towards Asahikawa	Furano Line	Kita-Biei F36 towards Furano
Location
- Location within Hokkaido Location within Japan

Chiyogaoka Station (千代ヶ岡駅, Chiyogaoka-eki) is a train station located in Asahikawa, Hokkaidō, Japan. It is operated by the Hokkaido Railway Company. Only local trains stop. The station is assigned the station number F35.

== Lines serviced ==
- Furano Line
