= Furano, Hokkaido =

Furano 富良野市
- City
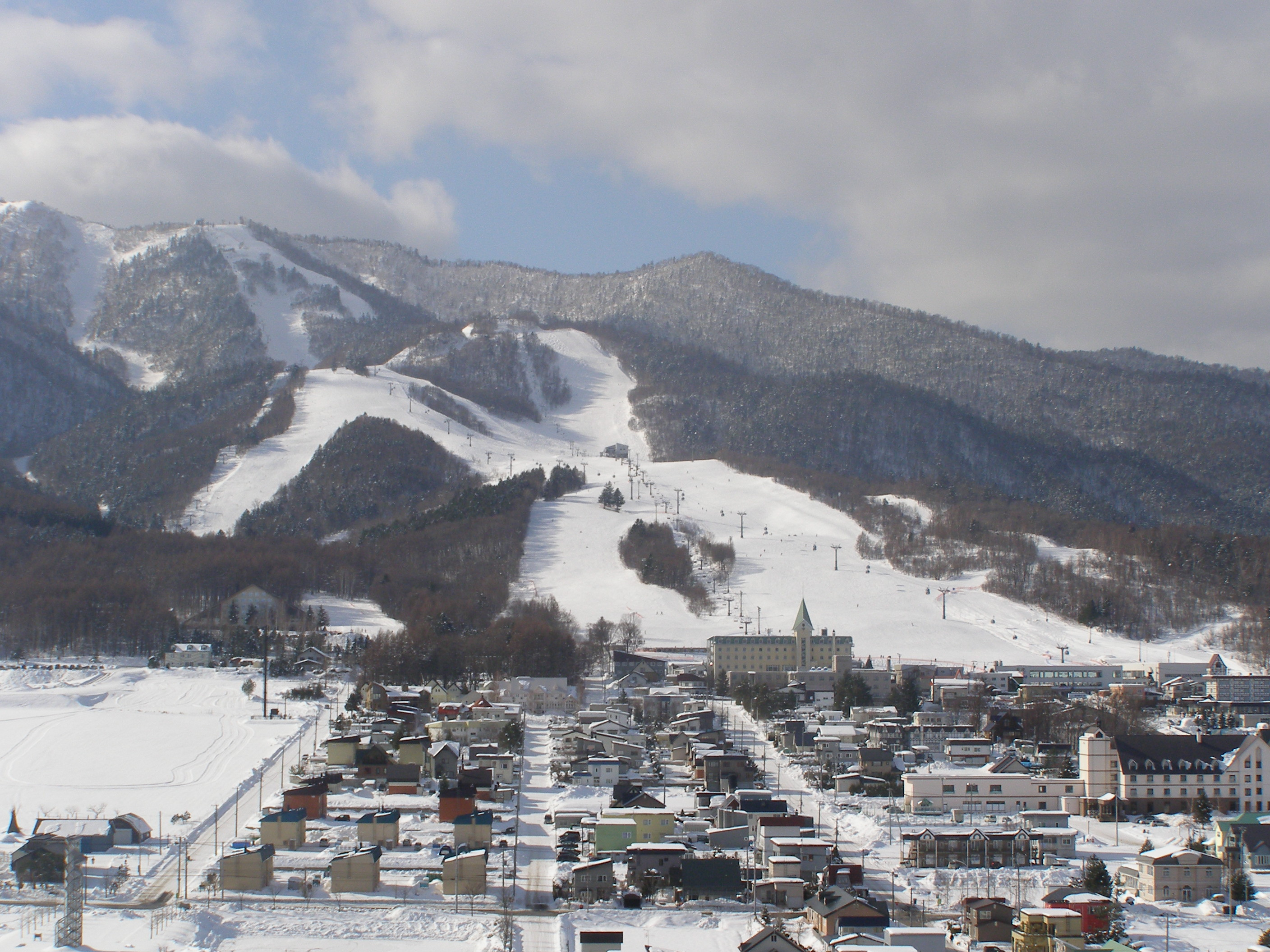
- Kitanomine ski area in Furano

- Flag Emblem

- Location of Furano in Kamikawa Subprefecture, Hokkaido

- Location of Kamikawa Subprefecture in Hokkaido

- Location in Japan
- Coordinates: 43°21′N 142°23′E
- Country: Japan
- Region: Hokkaido
- Prefecture: Hokkaido

Government
  - Mayor: Yoshiaki Noto

Area
  - Total: 600.97 km^{2} (232.04 sq mi)

Population (September 30th, 2016)
  - Total: 22,715
  - Density: 37.797/km^{2} (97.894/sq mi)
- Time zone: UTC+09:00 (JST)
- City hall address: 1-1, Yayoicho, Furano-shi, Hokkaido; 076-8555
- Website: www.city.furano.hokkaido.jp
- Symbols
- Bird: Black woodpecker
- Flower: Ezo-murasaki-tsutsuji (Rhododendron dauricum)
- Mammal: Red Squirrel(Sciurus vulgaris)
- Mascot: Hesomaru (へそ丸)
- Tree: Japanese yew and Japanese bigleaf magnolia

Furano (富良野市, Furano-shi) is a city in the prefecture of Hokkaido, Japan, located in the southern reaches of Kamikawa Subprefecture, under whose jurisdiction it resides. Well known throughout Japan as a tourist destination, it is famous for its lavender fields, the television drama Kita no Kuni kara, and the Furano Ski Resort, which hosted the Snowboarding World Cup in recent years. As of September 2016, the city has an estimated population of 22,715 and a density of 38 persons per km^{2} (98 persons per sq. mi.). The total area is 600.97 km^{2} (232.04 sq mi).

== History ==
The city takes its name from the Ainu word "Fura-nui," which means "Stinky Flame" or "Foul-Smelling Place," in the language of the indigenous people of Hokkaido. This is most likely because the valley was associated with sulfuric fumaroles near Tokachi Peak. In 1897, the first homesteaders arrived from Mie Prefecture and settled in what is now the Ogiyama area of the city. The Village of Furano was established as a satellite settlement of the then-preeminent Utashinai Village. In 1899, the settlement was transferred from under the jurisdiction of Sorachi County to Kamikawa County, an official town hall was raised, and Furano Village, Sorachi County was officially established.

Mass transportation soon followed, with the opening of a railway link to Asahikawa, now the second-largest city in Hokkaido, in 1900. Three years later, Furano was divided into the upper Kamifurano Village (the present-day town of Kamifurano) and the lower Shitafurano Village (present-day Furano and Minamifurano.) In 1908, Minamifurano Village (now a city) became an autonomous municipality. On April 1, 1915, Yamabe Village was created as a separate municipality, and Shimofurano, Sorachi County, gained Second Class Village Status in the Hokkaido Village System. Following rapid development, on April 1, 1919, Shitafurano Village achieved town status and was renamed Furano Town. It gained First Class Town Status exactly two years later. During the closing stages of World War II, Furano was bombed by American naval aircraft in July 1945. On September 30, 1956, Furano annexed the village of Higashiyama. Ten years later, Furano annexed the town of Yamabe, and the population boost was enough to make it a full-fledged city. Furano officially changed its name to Furano City on May 1, 1966.

== Economy ==
=== Industry ===
The keystone industry is agriculture, which is centered on onions and carrots. Furano notably produces more carrots than any other region in Japan. Watermelon and the Akaniku-brand "Furano Melon" are also made in large numbers.

Industry also includes tourism, particularly to its lavender fields and ski slopes, as well as the cultivation of grapes at a municipally managed winery and the production of dairy products, such as milk and cheese. Furano Delice, made famous for being the first candy factory to put pudding in a milk bottle, is well known for its Furano Milk Pudding.

=== Agricultural co-op ===
- Furano Agricultural Cooperative (JA Furano)

=== Local business ===
- Daisy Food Production Industries, Inc. – Furano Factory (デイジー食品工業株式会社富良野工場)

=== Financial institutions ===
- Asahikawa Credit Union, Furano Office (formerly Furano Credit Union)
- Hokkaido Bank, Ltd., Furano Office
- Hokkaido Workers Credit Union, Furano Office
- North Pacific Bank, Ltd., Furano Office
- Sorachi Commercial Credit Association, Furano Office

== Postal services ==
- Furano Post Office (the Furano Office of Japan Post Service Company, Ltd. is located within the same building.)
- Furano Wakaba Post Office (includes ATM service)
- Kitanomine Post Depot (postal service only)
- Rokugo Post Office

== Public service institutions ==
=== Police ===
- Furano Police Station

== Sister cities ==
- Schladming, Austria (since February 23, 1977)
- Nishiwaki, Hyōgo Prefecture, Japan (since October 20, 1978)
- Tainan, Taiwan (since August 28, 2024)

== Regional ==
=== Education ===
- High School
  - Public High Schools
    - Hokkaido Furano High School, Hokkaido Furano Ryokuho High School
- Technical Schools
  - Furano Nursing College
- Middle Schools
  - Furano Higashi, Furano Nishi, Jukai, Yamabe
- Elementary Schools
  - Furano, Ogiyama, Higashi, Torinuma, Furebetsu, Jukai, Yamabe
- Elementary/Middle Schools
  - Rokugo, Nunobe

== Transportation ==
=== Airport ===
- Asahikawa Airport is located south of Asahikawa's city center in the outlying town of Higashi Kagura. It is approximately an hour away from Furano by bus or car.

=== Railways ===
- Hokkaido Railway Company (JR Hokkaido)
  - Nemuro Line: Shimanoshita – Furano
  - Furano Line: Gakueden – Furano

=== Bus ===
- Furano Bus – city bus lines, Furano to Asahikawa (the "Lavender Express")
- Shimukappu municipally owned and operated Furano to Shimukappu bus line.
- Hokkaido Chuo Bus Co., Ltd. – Furano to Sapporo (the high-speed "Furano")
- Dohoku Bus Co., Ltd., Hokkaido Takusyoku Bus Co., Ltd., Tokachi Bus Co., Ltd. – Minamifurano to Obihiro (Northliner)

=== Highways ===
==== National Highways ====
- National Route 38
- National Route 237

==== Prefectural Highways ====
- Hokkaido Route 135 – Bibai, Furano
- Hokkaido Route 253 – Higashiyama, Furano
- Hokkaido Route 298 – Kamifurano, Asahikawa, Nakafurano
- Hokkaido Route 544 – Rokugo, Yamabe
- Hokkaido Route 706 – Nanyou, Yamabe
- Hokkaido Route 759 – Nae, Furano
- Hokkaido Route 800 – Kitanomine
- Hokkaido Route 985 – Yamabe, Kitanomine

== Historic sites, tourism destinations, festivals ==
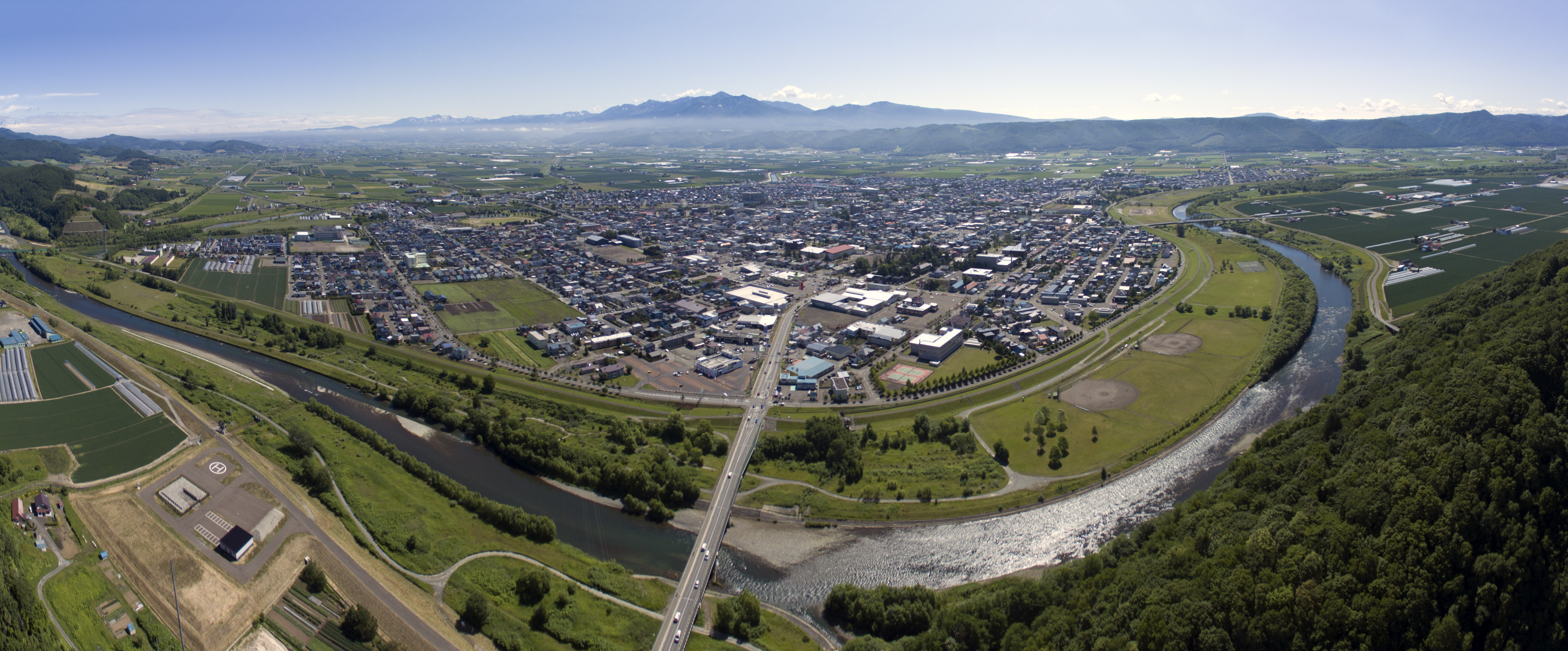
Aerial panorama of Furano

=== Cultural heritage ===
- Furano Traditional Chinese Lion Dance – The Furano Traditional Chinese Lion Dance Preservation Society is a part of the Furano City Lifelong Learning Center.
- A monument marking the exact geographic center of Hokkaido is located on the grounds of Furano Elementary School.
- Groundbreaking Memorial for the Hokkaido University Satellite Research Farm No.8, Furano Campus – Tenmangu Shrine Grounds
- Groundbreaking Memorial for the Hokkaido University Satellite Research Farm No.8, Yamabe Campus – Yamabe Shrine Grounds

=== Tourism destinations ===
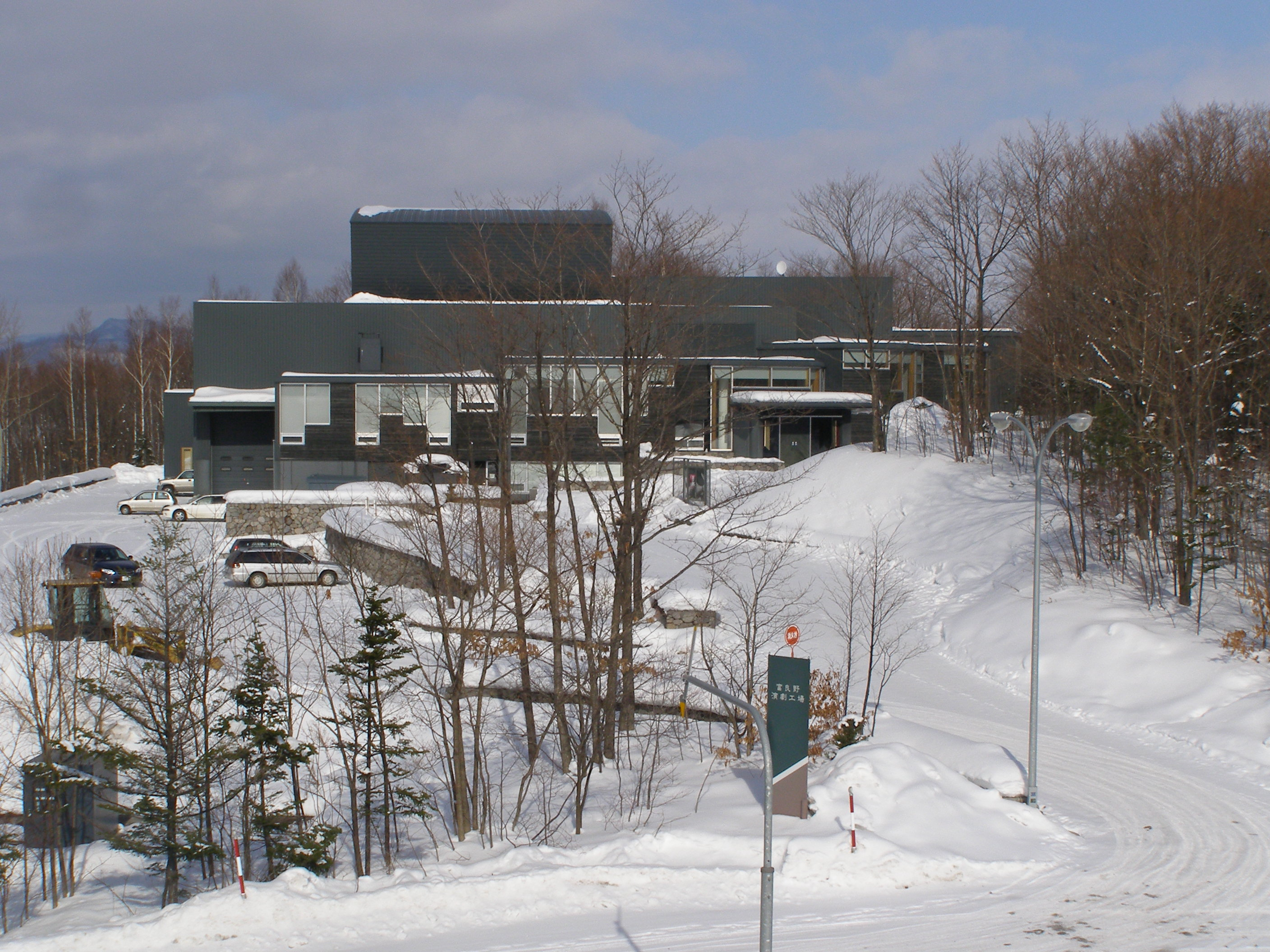
Furano Play Factory

Downtown District

- Kita no Kuni kara (北の国から) Museum is located almost directly adjacent to the Furano Station area.
- Gokokuzanfurano-ji – (護国山富良野寺) or Eighteenth Hokkaido Sanjuusan Sacred Grounds of Kannon Fudasho (北海道三十三観音霊場十八番札所). Since Furano is Hokkaido's Navel Town, they proudly display a replica of the Buddha Nyoirin Kannon Heso Ishi (Navel Stone) from Kyoto's famous temple Choho-ji.

Kitanomine District

- The Kitanomine Area is centered on ski resorts and pensions. Furano Ski Resort, owned and operated by Prince Hotels, is a popular winter destination for people from around the world. Ningle Terrace is a rustic sort of shopping village located just to the side of the New Furano Prince Hotel. The word “Ningle” refers to a 15 cm-tall character known as The Wise Man of the Forest, from a book with the same title that So Kuramoto wrote. The shopping area was created based on the writer's ideas. Open year-round, people from all over the area come to browse the handmade trinkets and look for faeries when the snow has not buried them alive. There is also a shop based on the one Takeshita Keiko (竹下景子) worked at in the 'Kita no Kuni kara' (北の国から) television drama.
- Furano Cheese Factory
- Furano Ice Milk Factory
- Furanoengekikoujou – Furano Theatre Factory (富良野演劇工場), a non-profit organization established and run by the city, Furano Theater Factory is a small-scale theater that strives to meet the creative needs of its citizens, hosting a myriad of events year-round. Sou Kuramoto, the famous writer of Kita no Kuni kara, designed the Theater Factory.

Rokugo District

- The houses used by the characters in the television drama 'Kita no Kuni kara' (北の国から) can still be found in the far reaches of the Furano city limits in the Rokugo area, separated from Furano Station by a distance of about 15 kilometers. Rokugo Forest served as the drama's setting during its early period. Gotaro's Stone House, The Lost and Found House, Jun and Ketsu's House, and Yahataoka, a hilly, back-country setting that came up frequently throughout the series, can all be found perfectly preserved in a memorial-esque open-air museum.
- Rokugo Observation Deck
- Furano Jam Farm
- Anpanman Shop
- Furano Music Box
- Popuri Village specializes in cultivating late-blooming Lavender, meaning visitors can see the purple flowers in all their glory, even if they have missed the season.

Other districts

- Highland Furano is a public spa in Shimanoshita, complete with a mid-sized lavender field.
- The city owns and operates a successful wine factory known as the Wine House.
- Furano Wine and Juice Factory is a publicly run business located in Shimizuyama.
- Torinuma Park is a public park famous for the fact that it never freezes, even though it is located in the heart of snow country, Japan. Camping is not allowed; however, visitors are strongly encouraged to camp at the nearby Yamabe Village of the Sun Nature Park.

=== Dramas staged in Furano ===
- Kita no Kuni kara (Fuji Terebi, 1981–2002)
- Yasashii Jikan (Fuji Terebi, 2005)
- Kaze no Gaaden (Fuji Terebi, 2008)

=== Festivals and other events ===
- Shoukon Festival – Peace Memorial Festival (June 15–16)
- Hokkaido Belly Button Festival (July 28–29)
- Furano Shrine's Annual Festival (August 25–26)

== Miscellaneous ==
=== Immigration ===
- In May 2009, Furano City joined hands with various private-sector associations to establish the Furano Chamber for the Promotion of Immigration.

== Geography ==
The Furano Valley is nestled between the Tokachi Volcanic Mountain Range (part of the Daisetsuzan National Park) and the Yuubari cluster of summits, including Ashibetsu Peak. The Sorachi and Furano Rivers, both tributaries of the Ishikari River, meet within the city limits. Furano is located at the exact geographic center of Hokkaido, earning it the nickname "Heso no Machi" or "Navel Town." A monument positioned at the center is located on the grounds of Furano Nishi Junior High School at 43°20′56″N 142°23′04″E.

Roughly 70% of the city is mountain and forest. In 1899, the Tokyo University Forest in Hokkaido was established for research purposes in the city's southeast sector. Nearby lies Rokugo Forest, the setting for the well-known Japanese television drama Kita no Kuni Kara.

== Climate ==
Furano has a humid continental climate (Köppen Dfb) with warm, occasionally hot, and humid summers and cold, extremely snowy winters. Given its latitude and its location on an island, Furano's winters are frigid.

Climate data for Furano (elevation 174 m, 1991–2020 normals, extremes 1976–present)
Month	Jan	Feb	Mar	Apr	May	Jun	Jul	Aug	Sep	Oct	Nov	Dec	Year
Record high °C (°F)	6.9 (44.4)	13.3 (55.9)	17.4 (63.3)	29.2 (84.6)	35.3 (95.5)	36.3 (97.3)	36.5 (97.7)	38.5 (101.3)	33.0 (91.4)	29.2 (84.6)	20.6 (69.1)	13.6 (56.5)	38.5 (101.3)
Mean daily maximum °C (°F)	−3.7 (25.3)	−2.3 (27.9)	2.7 (36.9)	10.9 (51.6)	18.4 (65.1)	22.9 (73.2)	26.2 (79.2)	26.3 (79.3)	21.9 (71.4)	14.9 (58.8)	6.4 (43.5)	−1.2 (29.8)	12.0 (53.6)
Daily mean °C (°F)	−8.3 (17.1)	−7.4 (18.7)	−2.2 (28.0)	5.3 (41.5)	12.1 (53.8)	16.8 (62.2)	20.6 (69.1)	20.8 (69.4)	16.1 (61.0)	9.2 (48.6)	2.1 (35.8)	−5.1 (22.8)	6.7 (44.1)
Mean daily minimum °C (°F)	−14.4 (6.1)	−14.0 (6.8)	−7.8 (18.0)	−0.2 (31.6)	6.0 (42.8)	11.5 (52.7)	16.0 (60.8)	16.3 (61.3)	11.1 (52.0)	4.1 (39.4)	−2.1 (28.2)	−10.2 (13.6)	1.4 (34.5)
Record low °C (°F)	−34.5 (−30.1)	−34.0 (−29.2)	−28.3 (−18.9)	−17.8 (0.0)	−3.1 (26.4)	1.0 (33.8)	6.3 (43.3)	6.5 (43.7)	−0.5 (31.1)	−5.3 (22.5)	−21.3 (−6.3)	−28.4 (−19.1)	−34.5 (−30.1)
Average precipitation mm (inches)	44.3 (1.74)	36.5 (1.44)	49.8 (1.96)	55.4 (2.18)	67.5 (2.66)	64.5 (2.54)	116.0 (4.57)	168.6 (6.64)	147.3 (5.80)	106.8 (4.20)	104.2 (4.10)	71.2 (2.80)	1,032.1 (40.63)
Average snowfall cm (inches)	145 (57)	121 (48)	110 (43)	22 (8.7)	0 (0)	0 (0)	0 (0)	0 (0)	0 (0)	2 (0.8)	72 (28)	159 (63)	628 (247)
Average extreme snow depth cm (inches)	64 (25)	73 (29)	71 (28)	23 (9.1)	0 (0)	0 (0)	0 (0)	0 (0)	0 (0)	2 (0.8)	23 (9.1)	46 (18)	78 (31)
Average precipitation days (≥ 1.0 mm)	14.3	12.3	13.5	11.9	11.0	9.9	10.9	11.7	12.8	14.4	17.9	17.2	157.8
Average snowy days (≥ 3.0 cm)	18.8	16.1	13.7	3.0	0	0	0	0	0	0.3	7.2	19.4	78.5
Mean monthly sunshine hours	64.3	78.5	124.0	159.9	190.5	176.8	171.8	154.9	140.2	121.9	67.7	45.7	1,496.2
Source: Japan Meteorological Agency (1991–2020 normals, extremes 1976–present)

Climate data for Rokugo, Furano (elevation 315 m, 1991–2020 normals, extremes 1978–present)
Month	Jan	Feb	Mar	Apr	May	Jun	Jul	Aug	Sep	Oct	Nov	Dec	Year
Record high °C (°F)	6.7 (44.1)	13.4 (56.1)	16.2 (61.2)	26.7 (80.1)	34.0 (93.2)	34.7 (94.5)	36.2 (97.2)	37.4 (99.3)	33.1 (91.6)	27.4 (81.3)	19.4 (66.9)	11.8 (53.2)	37.4 (99.3)
Mean daily maximum °C (°F)	−3.7 (25.3)	−2.6 (27.3)	1.9 (35.4)	9.7 (49.5)	17.3 (63.1)	21.8 (71.2)	25.1 (77.2)	25.3 (77.5)	20.9 (69.6)	13.9 (57.0)	5.5 (41.9)	−1.5 (29.3)	11.1 (52.0)
Daily mean °C (°F)	−8.5 (16.7)	−7.7 (18.1)	−2.9 (26.8)	4.1 (39.4)	10.9 (51.6)	15.6 (60.1)	19.6 (67.3)	19.9 (67.8)	15.2 (59.4)	8.1 (46.6)	1.1 (34.0)	−5.6 (21.9)	5.8 (42.4)
Mean daily minimum °C (°F)	−14.7 (5.5)	−14.5 (5.9)	−9.0 (15.8)	−1.6 (29.1)	4.4 (39.9)	9.8 (49.6)	14.7 (58.5)	15.2 (59.4)	10.0 (50.0)	2.7 (36.9)	−3.3 (26.1)	−10.9 (12.4)	0.2 (32.4)
Record low °C (°F)	−31.9 (−25.4)	−30.8 (−23.4)	−28.9 (−20.0)	−16.1 (3.0)	−4.2 (24.4)	−1.2 (29.8)	3.6 (38.5)	4.4 (39.9)	−1.1 (30.0)	−6.0 (21.2)	−20.2 (−4.4)	−26.2 (−15.2)	−31.9 (−25.4)
Average precipitation mm (inches)	47.0 (1.85)	38.3 (1.51)	53.2 (2.09)	59.9 (2.36)	67.3 (2.65)	64.7 (2.55)	119.5 (4.70)	165.6 (6.52)	135.8 (5.35)	102.1 (4.02)	101.9 (4.01)	73.7 (2.90)	1,028.9 (40.51)
Average precipitation days (≥ 1.0 mm)	15.7	13.8	14.7	13.1	11.9	10.2	11.7	12.3	13.0	14.2	18.0	18.8	167.5
Mean monthly sunshine hours	75.0	85.1	120.0	144.8	173.6	163.3	161.6	151.3	140.2	123.0	68.1	53.6	1,459.6
Source: Japan Meteorological Agency (1991–2020 normals, extremes 1978–present)

== Accent ==
There is a difference in how people in Hokkaido (including Furano's residents) and those in other parts of Japan pronounce the city's name. In Hokkaido, the first syllable in "Furano" is stressed; however, in the rest of Japan, the typical pattern of equally and weakly stressed syllables is predominant. The latter pronunciation was used in the drama that made Furano famous, even though it contradicted the local accent.

=== Notable people ===
- Tetsuya Kumakawa – ballet dancer
- Kazumi Kurigami – professional photographer
- Seiji Sugio – singer

== Mascot ==
Hesomaru, the city's mascot

Furano's mascot is Hesomaru (へそ丸). He is a farmer who likes to see people's navels. He was originally the mascot for the Hokkaido Belly Button Festival before becoming the city's mascot when he debuted on 15 August 1969. His favourite quote is "Isn't it good?" (イイじゃないか).

== Cultural references ==
Furano Milk Pudding is famous for being the first pudding ever to come in a glass bottle.

Niko Niko Pun, a children's television show produced by NHK, is filmed on location in Furano during the Summer and Winter Breaks.

== Mass communications ==
- Daily Furano (newspaper)
- Hokkaido Shimbun, Furano (newspaper)
- Radio Furano (community FM station) 77.1 MHz

== See also ==
- List of cities in Japan
