= Biei Station =

Railway station in Biei, Hokkaido, Japan

F37 Biei Station 美瑛駅
- The station building in October 2026

General information
- Location: 1-1 Motomachi, Biei-cho, Kamikawa-gun, Hokkaido 071-0208; Japan
- Coordinates: 43°35′28″N 142°27′42″E
- System: JR Hokkaido commuter rail station
- Operator: JR Hokkaido
- Line: Furano Line
- Platforms: 2 side platforms
- Tracks: 2

Construction
- Structure type: At grade

Other information
- Station code: F37

History
- Opened: September 1, 1899; 127 years ago

Services
Preceding station	JR Hokkaido	Following station
Kita-Biei F36 towards Asahikawa	Furano Line	Bibaushi F38 towards Furano
Location
- Location within Hokkaido Location within Japan

Biei Station (美瑛駅, Biei-eki) is a railway station on the Furano Line in Biei, Hokkaido, Japan, operated by the Hokkaido Railway Company (JR Hokkaido).

== Lines ==
Biei Station is served by the Furano Line.

== History ==
The station opened on September 1, 1899. With the privatization of Japanese National Railways (JNR) on 1 April 1987, the station came under the control of JR Hokkaido.

== See also ==
- List of railway stations in Japan
