= Kita-Biei Station =

Railway station in Biei, Hokkaido, Japan

Coordinates: 43.6177°N 142.4798°E

F36 Kita-Biei Station 北美瑛駅
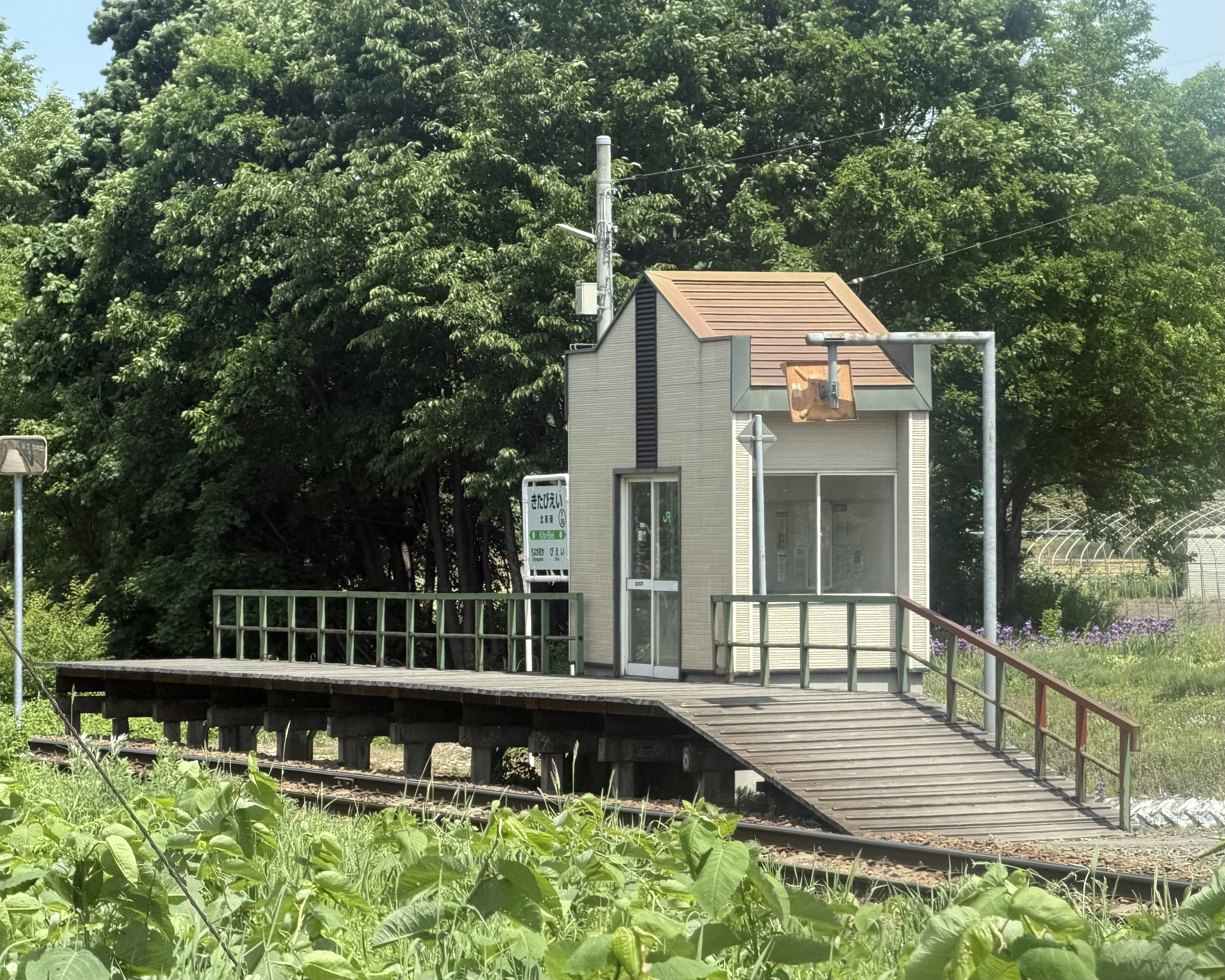
- Kita-Biei Station in June 2026

General information
- Operator: JR Hokkaido
- Line: Furano Line
- Platforms: 1 side platform
- Tracks: 1

Construction
- Structure type: At grade

Other information
- Station code: F36

History
- Opened: 25 March 1958; 68 years ago

Services
Preceding station	JR Hokkaido	Following station
Chiyogaoka F35 towards Asahikawa	Furano Line	Biei F37 towards Furano
Location
- Location within Hokkaido Location within Japan

Kita-Biei Station (北美瑛駅, Kita-Biei-eki) is a train station located in Biei, Hokkaidō, Japan. It is operated by the Hokkaido Railway Company. Only local trains stop. The station is assigned the station number F36.

== Lines serviced ==
- Furano Line
