= KiHa 150 =

Japanese train type

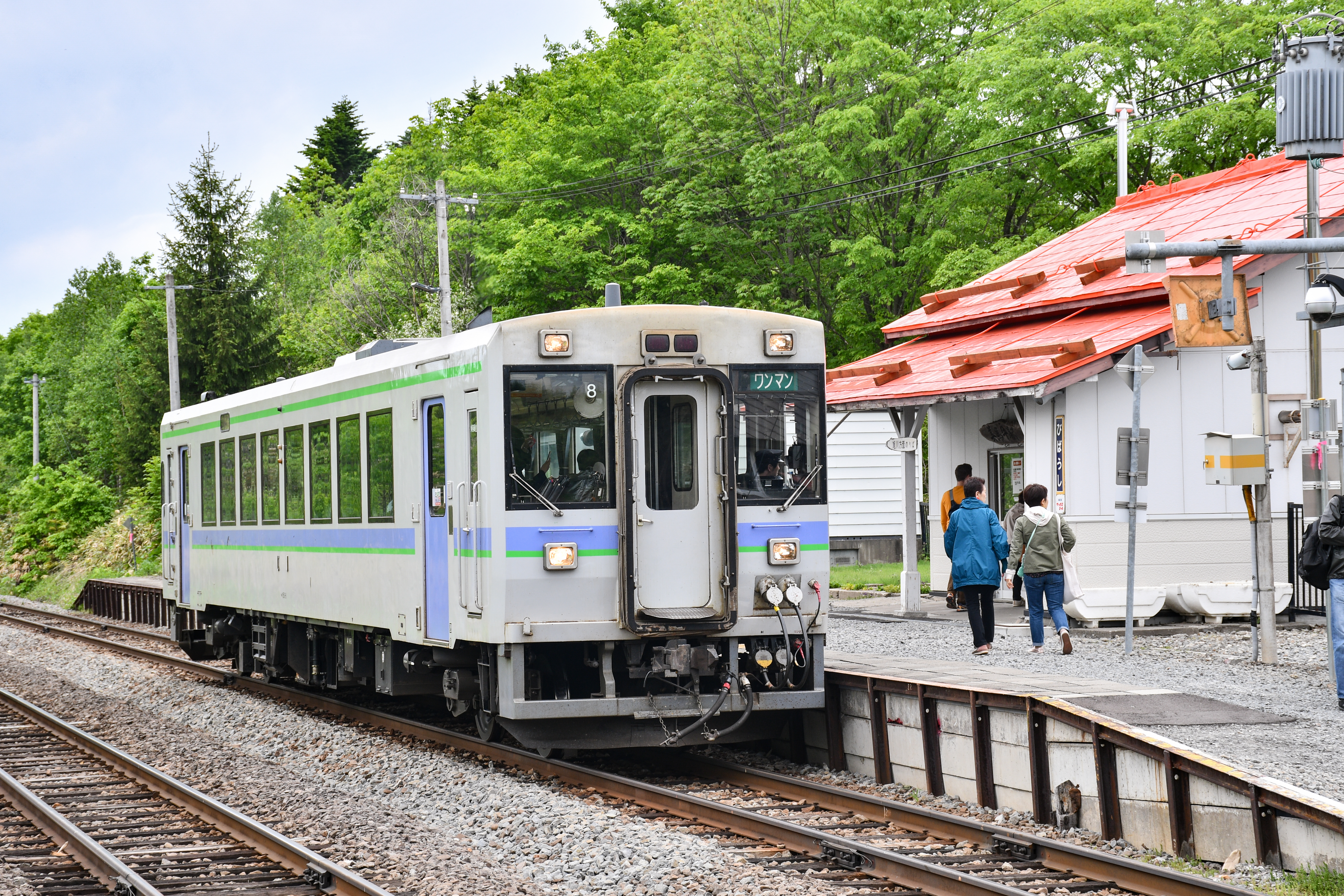
- KiHa 150-0 on the Furano Line, May 2019
- In service: 1993–present
- Manufacturer: Fuji Heavy Industries
- Constructed: 1993–1995
- Number built: 27 vehicles
- Number in service: 27 vehicles
- Formation: Single car
- Capacity: 49
- Operator: JR Hokkaido
- Depots: Asahikawa, Naebo, Tomakomai

Specifications
- Car length: 20,900 mm (68 ft 7 in)
- Width: 2,925 mm (9 ft 7.2 in)
- Doors: 2 sliding doors per side
- Maximum speed: 110 km/h (68 mph)
- Weight: 33.3 t (KiHa 150-0); 33.1 t (KiHa 150-100)
- Prime mover: N-KDMF15HZ
- Power output: 450 hp
- Transmission: Hydraulic
- Multiple working: KiHa 40 series, KiHa 54
- Track gauge: 1,067 mm (3 ft 6 in)

The KiHa 150 (キハ150形) is a single-car diesel multiple unit operated by Hokkaido Railway Company (JR Hokkaido) in Japan.

The "KiHa" designation derives from the classification system used by JNR. "Ki" indicates a diesel-powered vehicle, while "Ha" indicates an ordinary passenger car, as opposed to a green car.

== Variants ==
A total of 27 cars were built, with the class divided into two sub-classes: KiHa 150-0 (17 cars) and KiHa 150-100 (10 cars).

- KiHa 150-0
- KiHa 150-100

== KiHa 150-0 ==
Ten KiHa 150-0 cars were built by Fuji Heavy Industries between February and May 1993 and allocated to Asahikawa Depot for use on Furano Line and Nemuro Main Line duties. A further seven cars (KiHa 150-11 to 17) were delivered in January and February 1995, and allocated to Naebo Depot for use on Hakodate Main Line services.

These cars have double-glazed sealed windows with air-conditioning. External livery of the Asahikawa-based cars included a broad light purple waistline stripe with doors painted light purple, while the external livery of the Naebo-based cars included a broad green waistline stripe with doors painted green.

All units in Naebo Depot have been transferred to Asahikawa Depot after the H100 series entered service in 2020, and are re-allocated to Furano Line and Sekihoku Main Line for local train services along with the original Asahikawa Depot units.

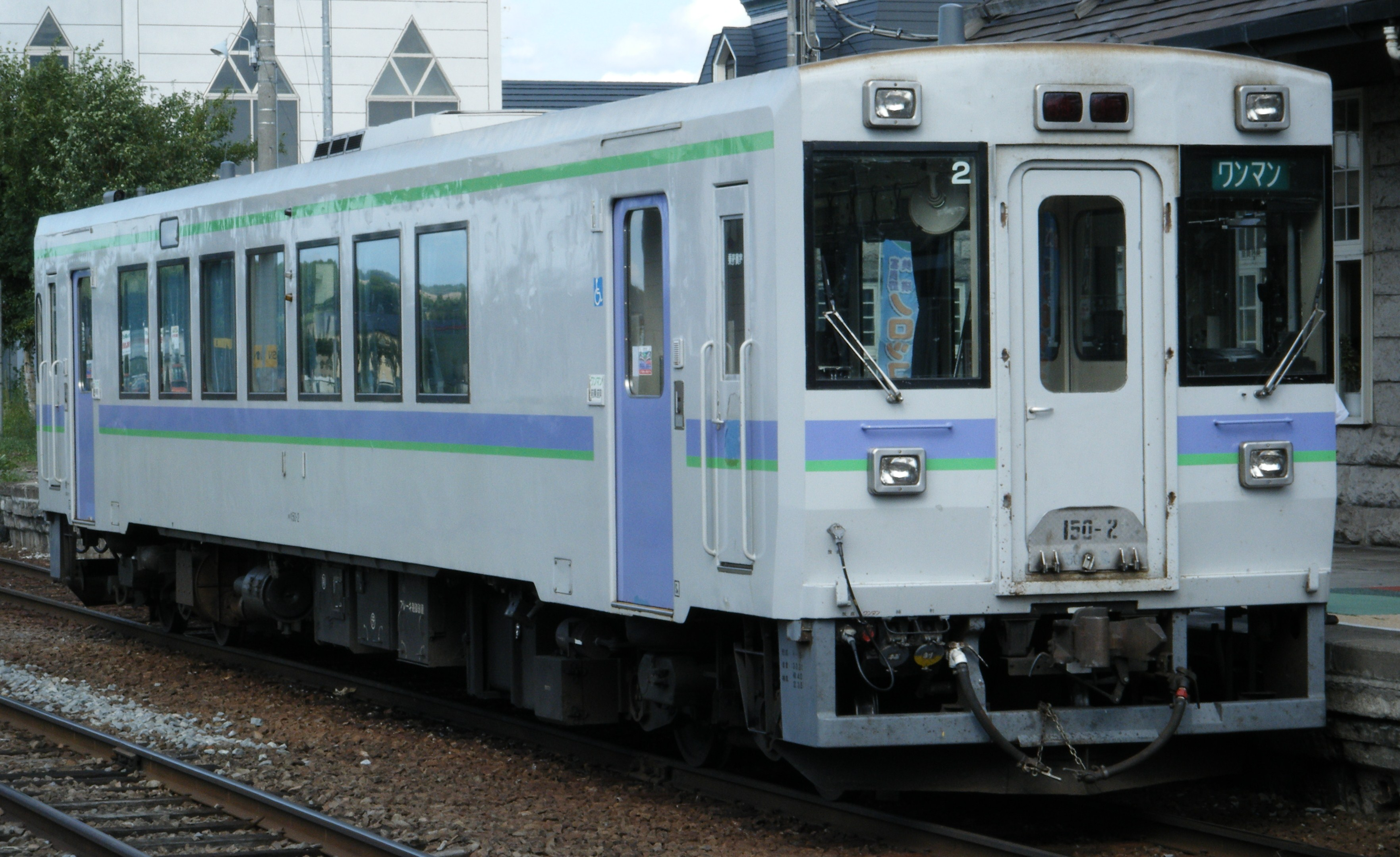
Asahikawa-based KiHa 150-2, August 2008

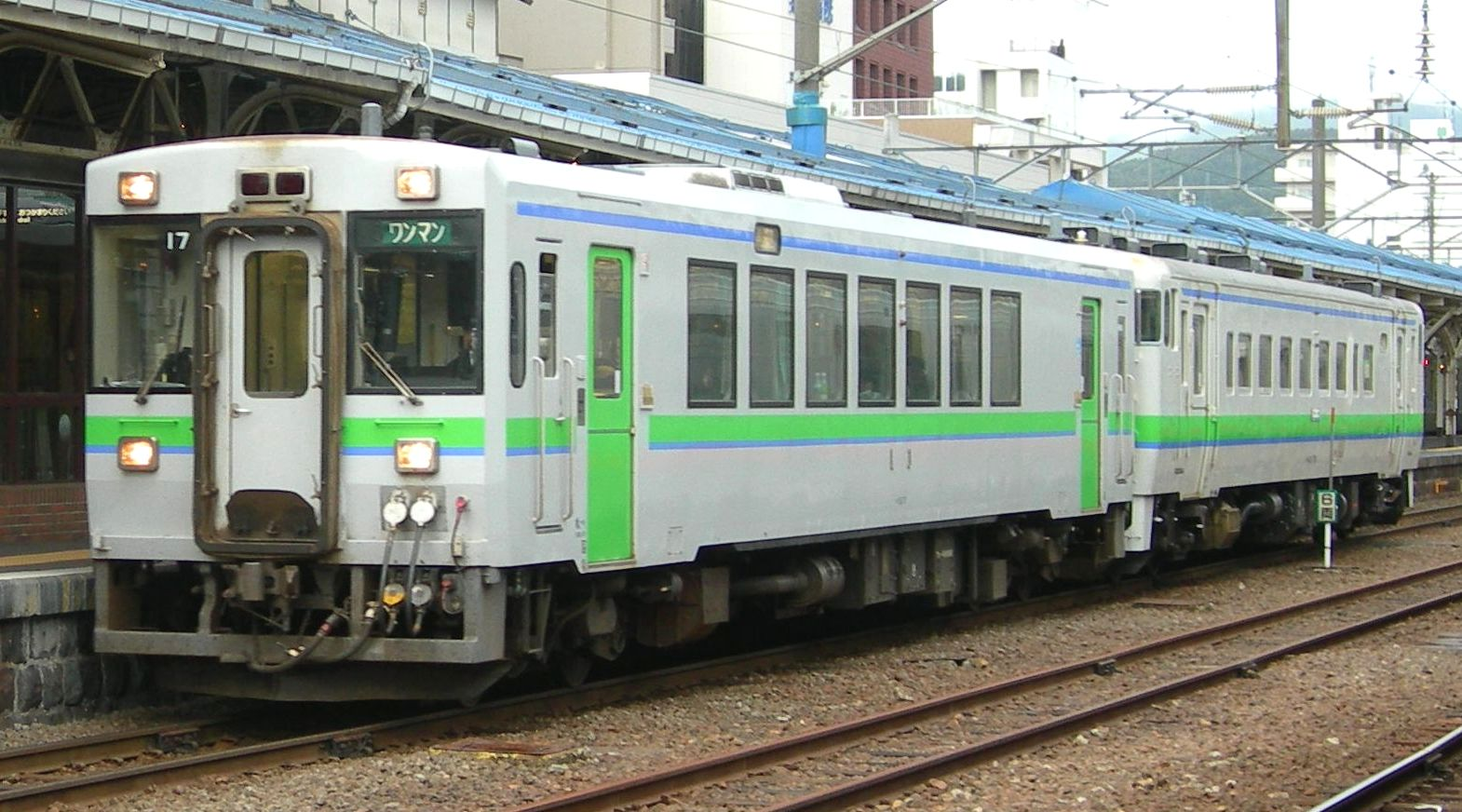
Naebo-based KiHa 150-17 with KiHa 40, September 2009

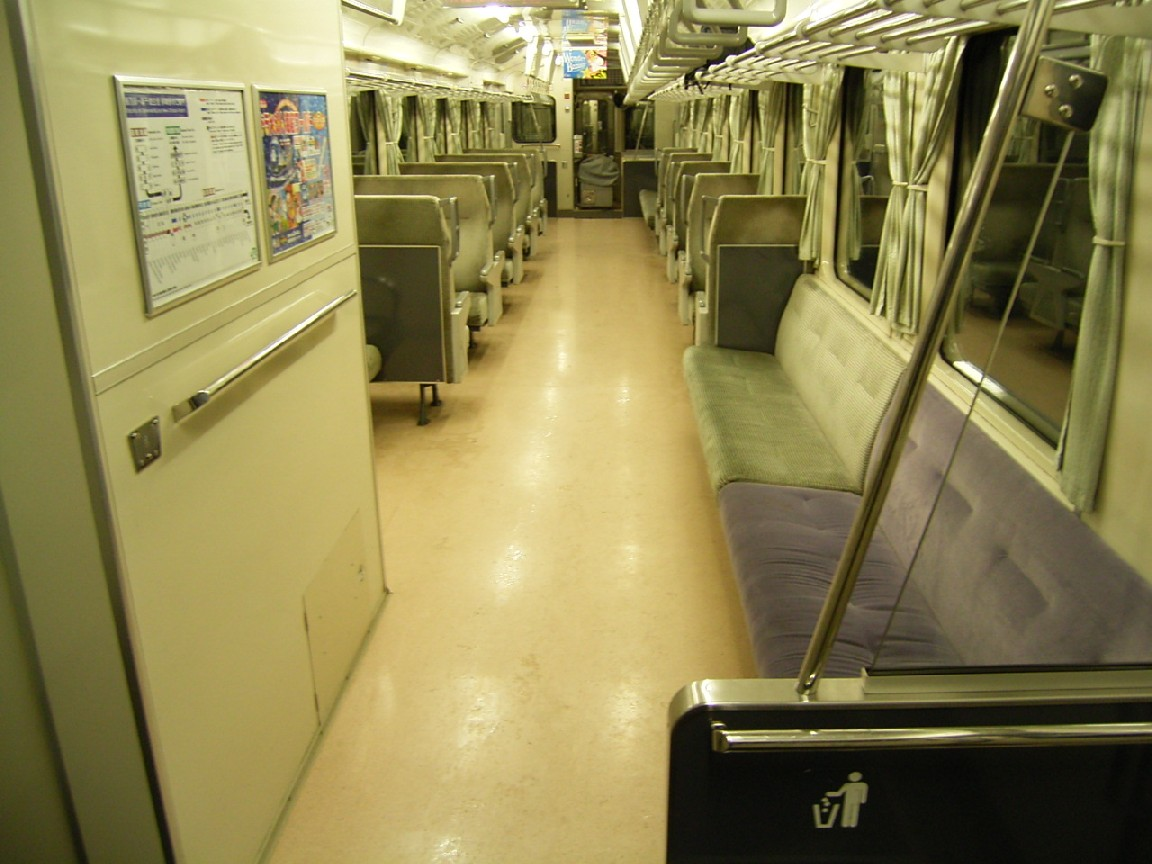
Interior view

== KiHa 150-100 ==
Ten KiHa 150-100 cars (KiHa 150-101 to 110) were delivered in May 1993 and allocated to Tomakomai Depot for use on Muroran Main Line duties.

These cars have no air-conditioning, with inward-opening hopper windows. External livery included a broad light green waistline stripe, as on the second batch of KiHa 150-0 cars. The doors are also painted green.

After all KiHa 150-0 cars were re-allocated to Asahikawa Depot, these Tomakomai-based cars are also seen on Sekishō Line and the non-electrified section of Hakodate Main Line.

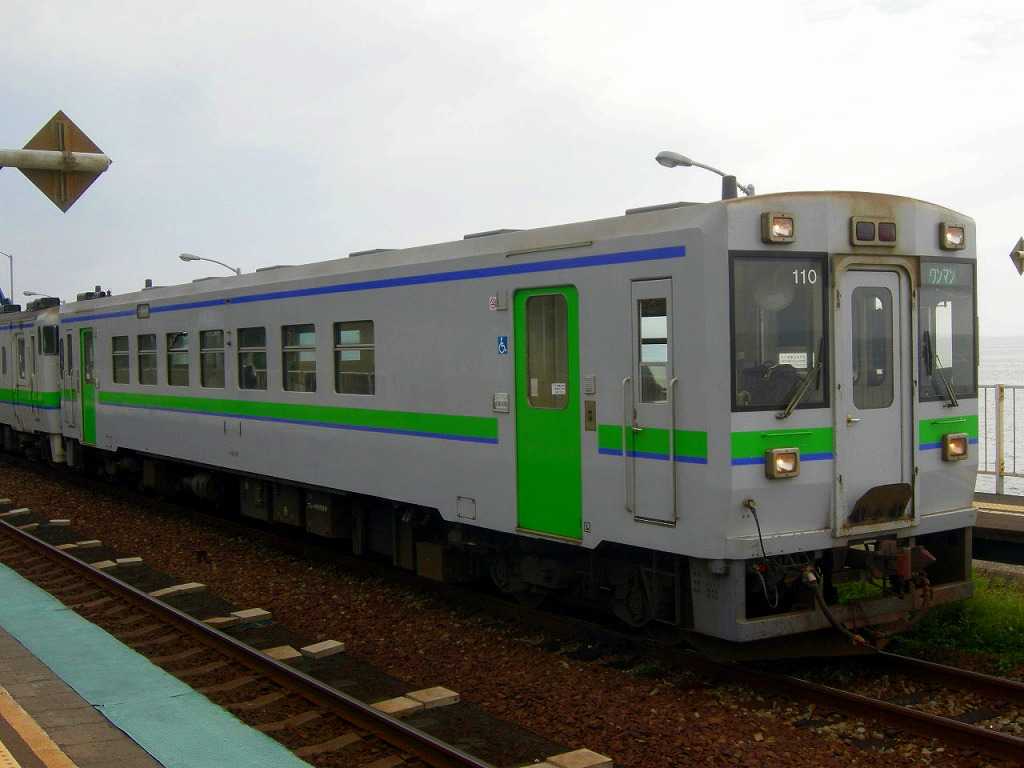
Tomakomai-based KiHa 150-110, September 2008
