= Furano Line =

Railway line in Hokkaido, Japan

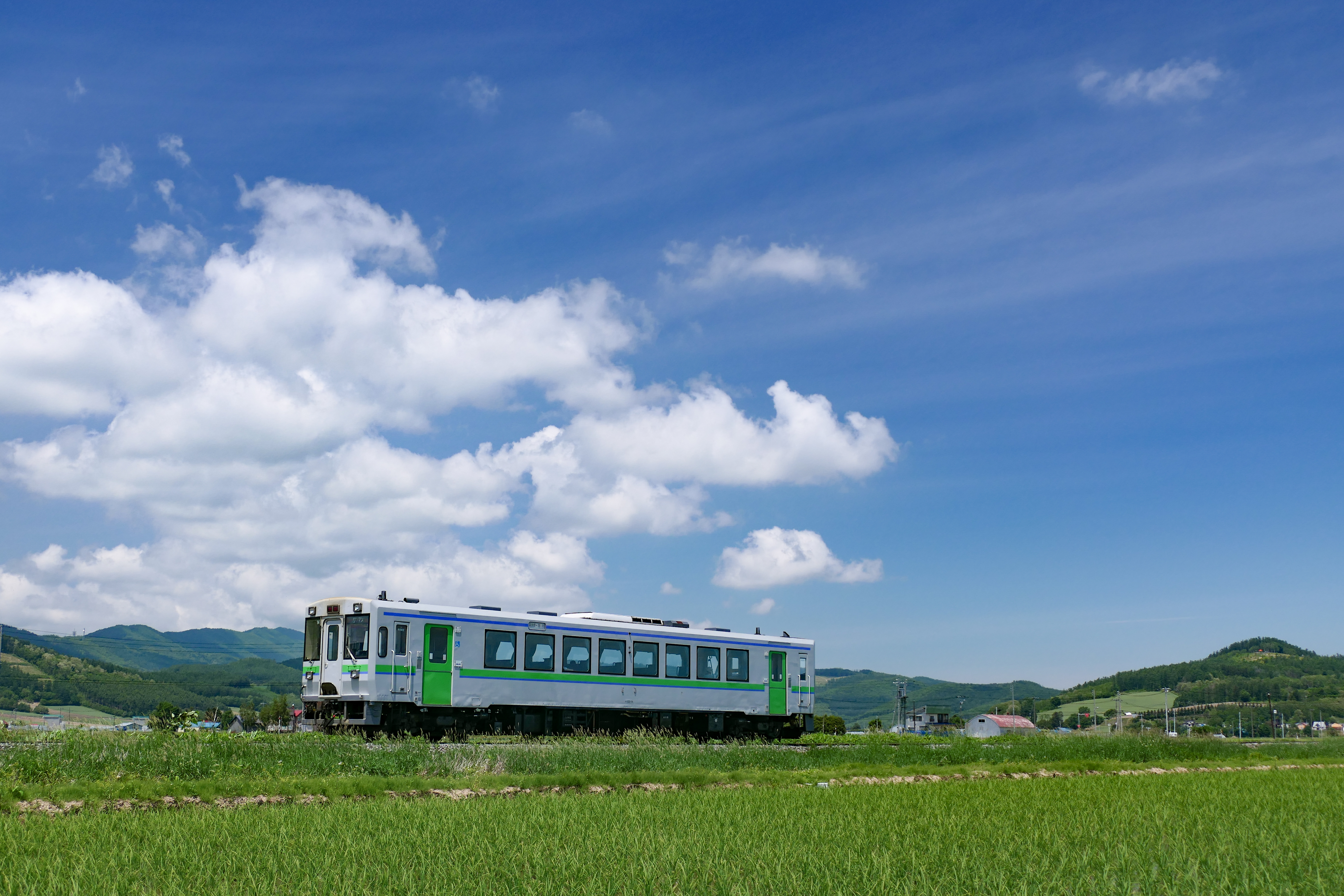
- Kiha 150 Diesel Multiple Unit on the Furano Line

Overview
- Native name: 富良野線
- Status: In operation
- Owner: Hokkaido Railway Company
- Locale: Hokkaido, Japan
- Termini: Asahikawa; Furano
- Stations: 18

Service
- Type: Heavy rail
- Operator(s): Hokkaido Railway Company
- Rolling stock: KiHa 150 series DMU, KiHa 183 series DMU

History
- Opened: 1899; 127 years ago

Technical
- Line length: 54.8 km (34.1 mi)
- Number of tracks: Entire line single tracked
- Character: Rural
- Track gauge: 1,067 mm (3 ft 6 in)
- Electrification: None
- Operating speed: 85 km/h (53 mph)
Route map

The Furano Line (富良野線, Furano-sen) is part of the Hokkaido Railway Company network in Hokkaidō, Japan. It connects Furano Station in the city of Furano and Asahikawa Station in the city of Asahikawa. Popular with tourists, it has recently come to serve commuters in the bedroom towns that are developing as suburbs of Asahikawa.

== History ==
The Furano Line opened on September 1, 1899, as the Hokkaidō Kansetsu Railway (北海道官設鉄道, Hokkaidō Kansetsu Tetsudō), operating between Asahikawa and Biei Stations. In the next month, service extended to Kami-Furano Station, and in the following year it reached Shimo-Furano Station.

In 1909 it became part of the Nemuro Main Line from Asahikawa Station to Kushiro Station, but in 1913 it took its present name and covered the route from Asahikawa Station to Shimo-Furano Station. The eruption of Mount Tokachi on May 24, 1926, caused a protracted interruption of service between Biei and Kami-Furano. In 1942, Shimo-Furano Station changed its name to Furano Station.

On April 1, 1987, with the breakup of the Japanese National Railways, the line became part of the Hokkaido Railways. In 2007, the station-numbering plan took effect.

On November 19, 2016, JR Hokkaido's president announced plans to rationalize the network by up to 1,237 km, or ~50% of the current network, including the proposed conversion to Third Sector operation of the Furano Line, but if local governments protest this decision, the line will face closure.

=== Former connecting lines ===
The private Asahikawa Electric Railway line to Higashikawa (15.5 km) branched from the Furano line south of Asahikawa station, operating from 1927 to 1973. A 6.7 km branch to Asahiyama Park operated from 1930 to 1973. Both lines were electrified at 600 V DC.

== Operations ==
All trains are local trains within the Furano Line which operate only within the Furano Line, half covering the route between Asahikawa and Biei. Nearly all rolling stock is KiHa 150 Diesel Multiple Units. On 18 March 2023, 38 H100 series train sets were introduced to the Furano Line.

== Stations ==
Station numbers, names, other lines serving the stations and line distances from Asahikawa are as follows. Other than seasonal Lavender Farm, trains may also randomly skip stations marked "◌".

| No. | Station name | Japanese | Distance (km) | Passing loop | Transfers |
|---|---|---|---|---|---|
| A28 | Asahikawa | 旭川 | 0.0 | n/a (Note: Asahikawa station is part of the double-tracked Hakodate Main Line.) | ■ Hakodate Main Line ■ Sekihoku Main Line ■ Sōya Main Line |
| F29 | Kaguraoka | 神楽岡 | 2.4 | | |
| F30 | Midorigaoka | 緑が丘 | 4.0 | | |
| F31 | Nishi-Goryō | 西御料 | 5.2 | | |
| F32 | Nishi-Mizuho ◌ | 西瑞穂 | 7.4 | | |
| F33 | Nishi-Kagura | 西神楽 | 9.9 | + | |
| F34 | Nishi-Seiwa ◌ | 西聖和 | 12.3 | | |
| F35 | Chiyogaoka | 千代ヶ岡 | 16.6 | + | |
| F36 | Kita-Biei ◌ | 北美瑛 | 20.3 | | |
| F37 | Biei | 美瑛 | 23.8 | + | |
| F38 | Bibaushi | 美馬牛 | 30.6 | + | |
| F39 | Kami-Furano | 上富良野 | 39.7 | + | |
| F40 | Nishinaka ◌ | 西中 | 44.2 | | |
| F41 | Lavender Farm (open seasonally) | ラベンダー畑 | 45.8 | | |
| F42 | Naka-Furano | 中富良野 | 47.3 | + | |
| F43 | Shikauchi ◌ | 鹿討 | 49.7 | | |
| F44 | Gakuden ◌ | 学田 | 52.5 | | |
| T30 | Furano | 富良野 | 54.8 | + | ■ Nemuro Main Line |
