= GV-E400 series =

Japanese diesel-electric multiple unit train

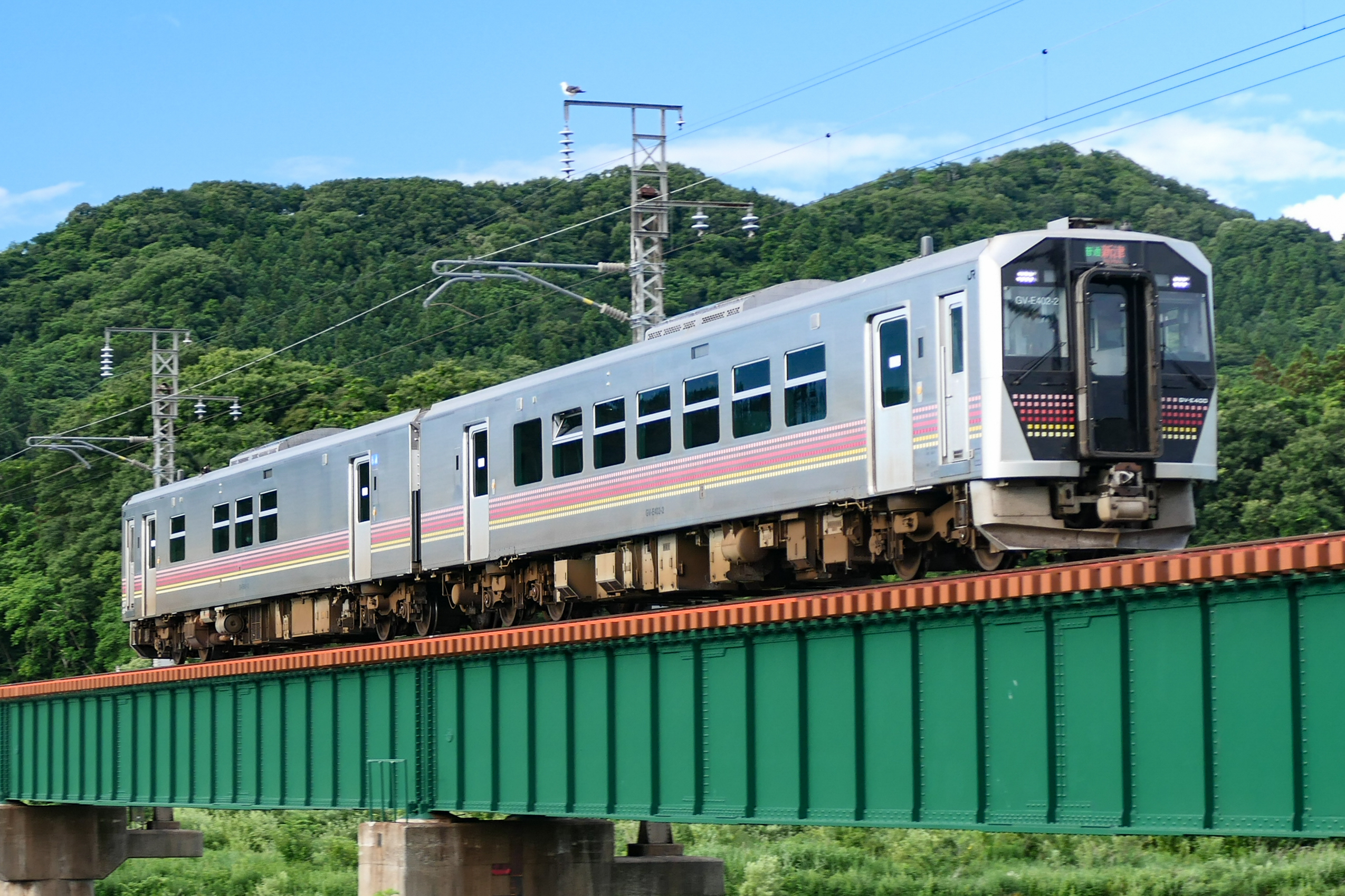
- Niigata-area GV-E400 series on the Uetsu Main Line in July 2022
- Manufacturer: Kawasaki Heavy Industries
- Built at: Kobe
- Replaced: KiHa 40
- Constructed: 2017–
- Entered service: 19 August 2019
- Number built: 63 vehicles
- Number in service: 63 vehicles (as of 15 October 2021)
- Formation: 1/2 cars per unit
- Operator: JR East
- Depots: Akita, Niitsu
- Lines served: Uetsu Main Line; Shinetsu Main Line; Yonesaka Line; Banetsu West Line; Tsugaru Line; Gono Line; Ou Main Line

Specifications
- Car body construction: Stainless steel
- Car length: 19,500 mm (64 ft 0 in)
- Width: 2,800 mm (9 ft 2 in)
- Height: 3,640 mm (11 ft 11 in)
- Floor height: 1,150 mm (3 ft 9 in)
- Doors: Two per side
- Maximum speed: 100 km/h (62 mph)
- Track gauge: 1,067 mm (3 ft 6 in)

The GV-E400 series (GV-E400系) is a diesel-electric multiple unit (DEMU) train type operated by East Japan Railway Company (JR East) in the Niigata and Akita areas of Japan from 2019.

== Design ==
The GV-E400 series trains are the first diesel-electric multiple units (not including hybrid train) to be operated by JR East, with diesel engines driving generators, which in turn power electric traction motors. The trains have stainless steel bodies and a maximum speed of 100 km/h (62 mph).

Internally, the sets use LED lighting throughout. Passenger accommodation consists of a mixture of longitudinal bench seating and transverse seating bays. The Niigata-area sets use pink seat moquette, and the Akita sets use blue seat moquette.

The design of the GV-E400 series served as the basis for the H100 series units operated by JR Hokkaido.

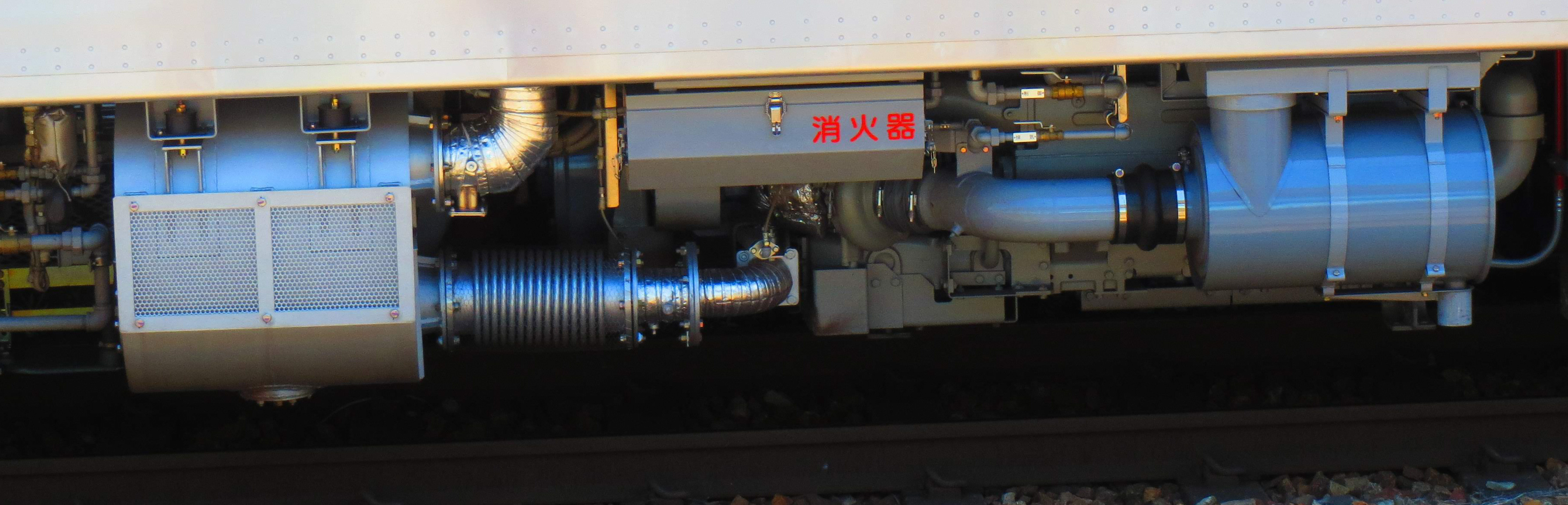
Komatsu DMF15HZD-G engine, which dedicates to generating electric power

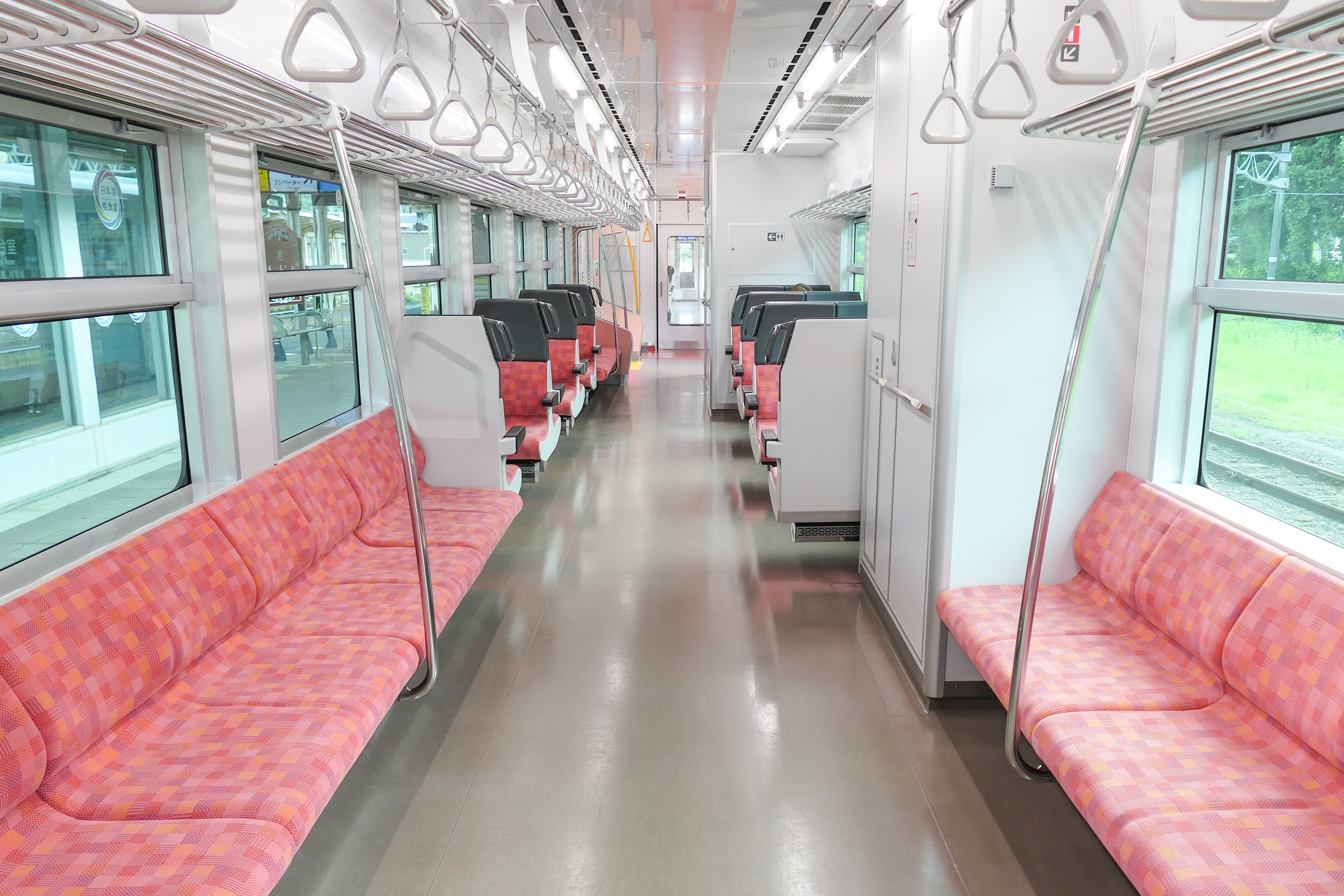
Interior (Niigata-area set)

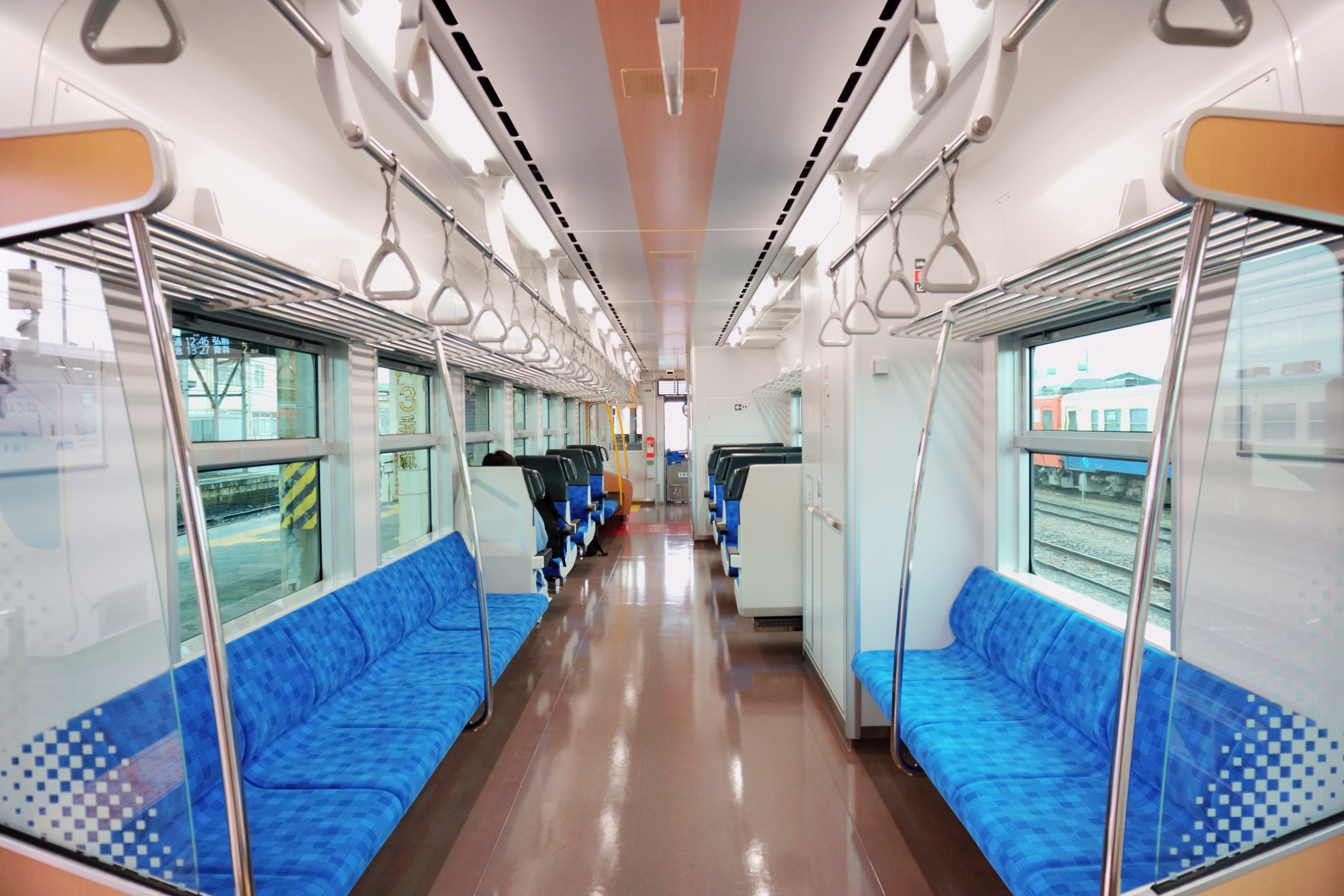
Interior (Akita-area set)

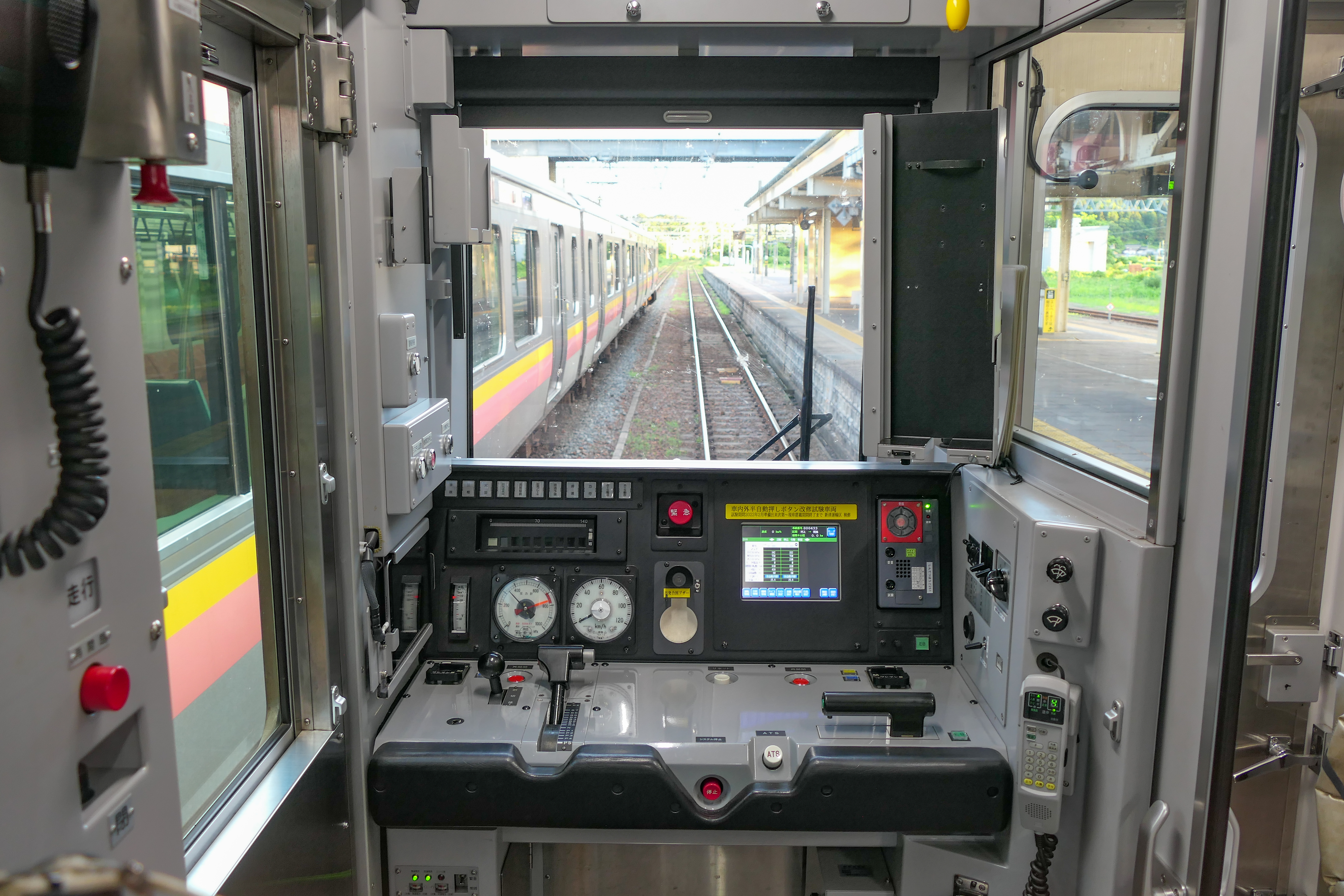
Driver's cab

== Operations ==
GV-E400 operations in Niigata as of March 2020 shown in deep red

The GV-E400 series trains are scheduled to be used on the following lines.

Niigata area (from FY2019)

- Uetsu Main Line (Niigata and Yamagata Prefectures)
- Shinetsu Main Line (Niigata Prefecture)
- Yonesaka Line (Niigata and Yamagata Prefectures)
- Banetsu West Line (Niigata and Fukushima Prefectures)

Akita area (from FY2020)

- Tsugaru Line (Aomori Prefecture) (From 03 March 2021 until 14 March 2025)
- Gono Line (Akita and Aomori Prefectures)
- Ou Main Line (Akita and Aomori Prefectures)

== Formations ==
The trains are formed as single-car units classified GV-E400 and two-car units classified GV-E401 + GV-E402.

== History ==
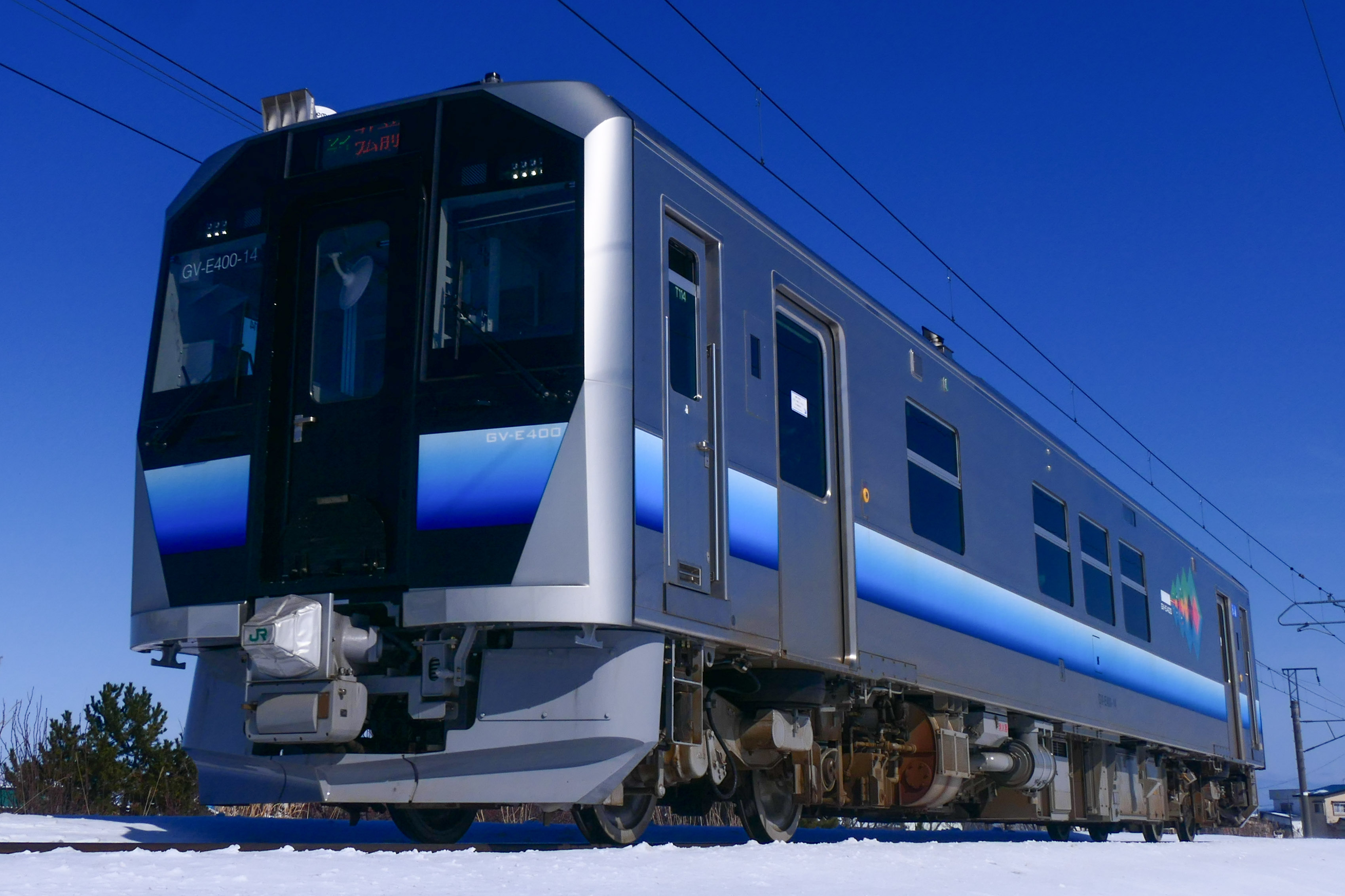
Akita-area GV-E400 series single-car unit in February 2021

Details of the new trains were announced by JR East on 4 July 2017. A total of 63 vehicles are scheduled to be built, entering service in the Niigata area from 2019, and in the Akita area from 2020.

One single-car unit and one two-car unit were delivered from the Kawasaki Heavy Industries factory in Kobe in January 2018 for test-running and evaluation.

The first train entered service on 19 August 2019.

=== Fleet ===
The depots and deliveries dates for the fleet are as shown below.

GV-E400
Set No.		Depot	Delivery date
GV-E400-1		Niitsu	January 2018
GV-E400-2		Niitsu	May 2019
GV-E400-3		Niitsu	September 2019
GV-E400-4		Niitsu	December 2019
GV-E400-5		Niitsu	December 2019
GV-E400-6		Niitsu	January 2020
GV-E400-7		Niitsu	January 2020
GV-E400-8		Niitsu	February 2020
GV-E400-9		Akita	July 2020
GV-E400-10		Akita	September 2020
GV-E400-11		Akita	November 2020
GV-E400-12		Akita	November 2020
GV-E400-13		Akita	December 2020
GV-E400-14		Akita	December 2020
GV-E400-15		Akita	january 2021
GV-E400-16		Akita	January 2021
GV-E400-17		Akita	February 2021
GV-E400-18		Akita	February 2021
GV-E400-19		Akita	April 2021
GV-E401+GV-E402
Car 1	Car 2	Depot	Delivery date
GV-E401-1	GV-E402-1	Niitsu	January 2018
GV-E401-2	GV-E402-2	Niitsu	May 2019
GV-E401-3	GV-E402-3	Niitsu	September 2019
GV-E401-4	GV-E402-4	Niitsu	September 2019
GV-E401-5	GV-E402-5	Niitsu	December 2019
GV-E401-6	GV-E402-6	Niitsu	December 2019
GV-E401-7	GV-E402-7	Niitsu	December 2019
GV-E401-8	GV-E402-8	Niitsu	December 2019
GV-E401-9	GV-E402-9	Niitsu	January 2020
GV-E401-10	GV-E402-10	Niitsu	January 2020
GV-E401-11	GV-E402-11	Niitsu	January 2020
GV-E401-12	GV-E402-12	Niitsu	January 2020
GV-E401-13	GV-E402-13	Niitsu	February 2020
GV-E401-14	GV-E402-14	Niitsu	February 2020
GV-E401-15	GV-E402-15	Niitsu	March 2020
GV-E401-16	GV-E402-16	Niitsu	March 2020
GV-E401-17	GV-E402-17	Akita	July 2020
GV-E401-18	GV-E402-18	Akita	November 2020
GV-E401-19	GV-E402-19	Akita	December 2020
GV-E401-20	GV-E402-20	Akita	January 2021
GV-E401-21	GV-E402-21	Akita	February 2021
GV-E401-22	GV-E402-22	Akita	April 2021

== See also ==
- H100 series, a JR Hokkaido DEMU based on the GV-E400 series design
