= H100 series =

Japanese diesel-electric multiple unit train type

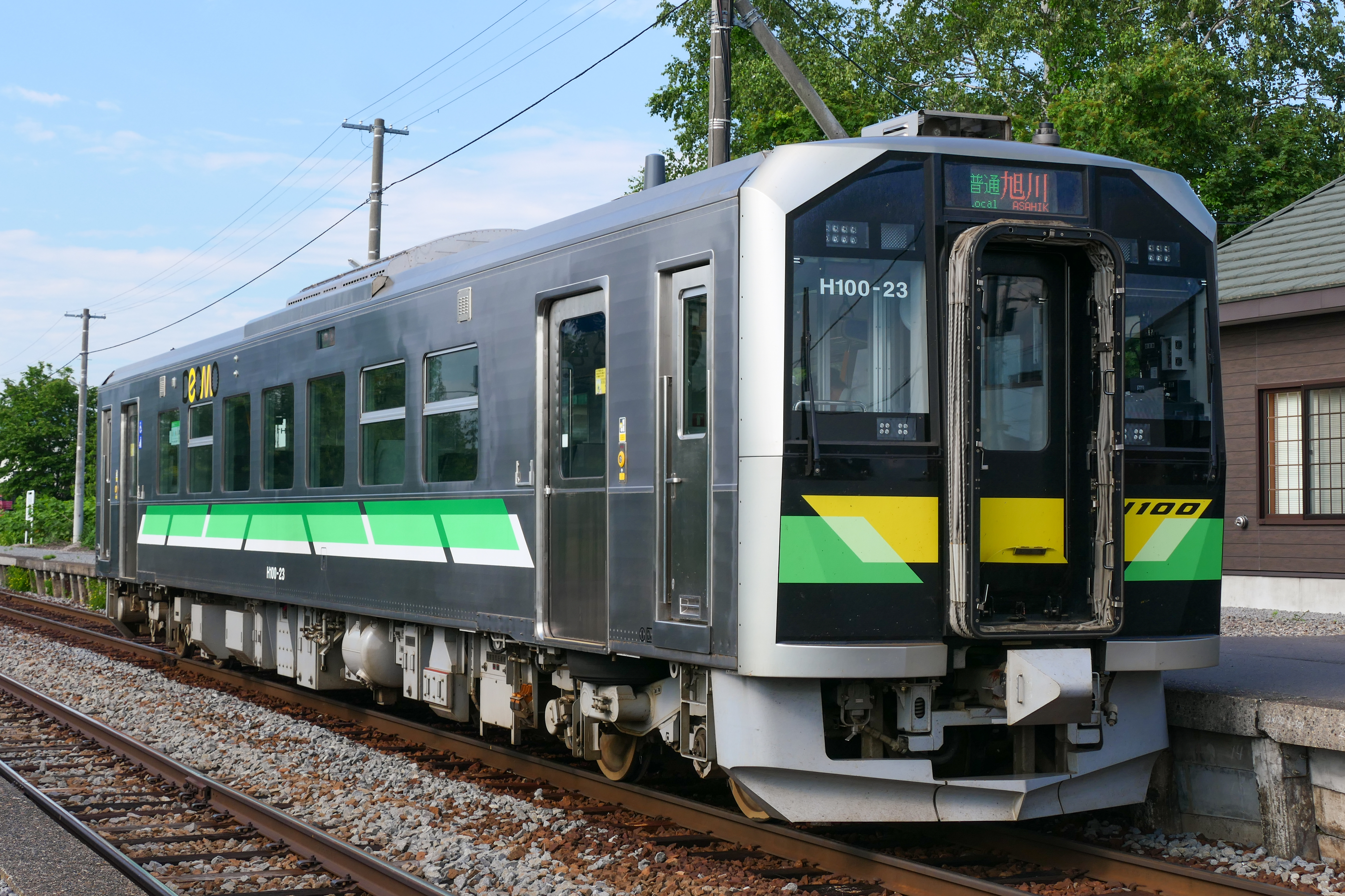
- H100-23 in June 2022
- Manufacturer: Kawasaki Heavy Industries
- Built at: Kobe
- Family name: DECMO
- Replaced: KiHa 40 series
- Constructed: 2018–2024
- Number built: 99 units
- Number in service: 99 units
- Formation: Single car unit
- Operator: JR Hokkaido
- Lines served: Hakodate Main Line; Furano Line; Senmō Main Line; Sekihoku Line

Specifications
- Car body construction: Stainless steel
- Floor height: 1,150 mm (3 ft 9 in)
- Doors: Two per side
- Maximum speed: 100 km/h (62 mph)
- Power output: 450 hp (340 kW) per car
- Track gauge: 1,067 mm (3 ft 6 in)

The H100 series (H100形) is a Japanese diesel-electric multiple unit (DEMU) train type introduced by Hokkaido Railway Company (JR Hokkaido) to replace the ageing KiHa 40 series DMU cars. The trains are nicknamed "DECMO", standing for "diesel electric car with motors". They commenced passenger operations in March 2020 on the Hakodate Main Line.

== Design ==
Based on the GV-E400 series DMUs on order by JR East, the H100 series trains are the first diesel-electric multiple units to be operated by JR Hokkaido, with diesel engines driving generators, which in turn power electric traction motors. The trains have stainless steel bodies, and a maximum speed of 100 km/h (62 mph).

== Interior ==
Passenger accommodation consists of longitudinal seating close to the doorways and 2+1 transverse seating further inside the cars. The cars have universal access toilets.

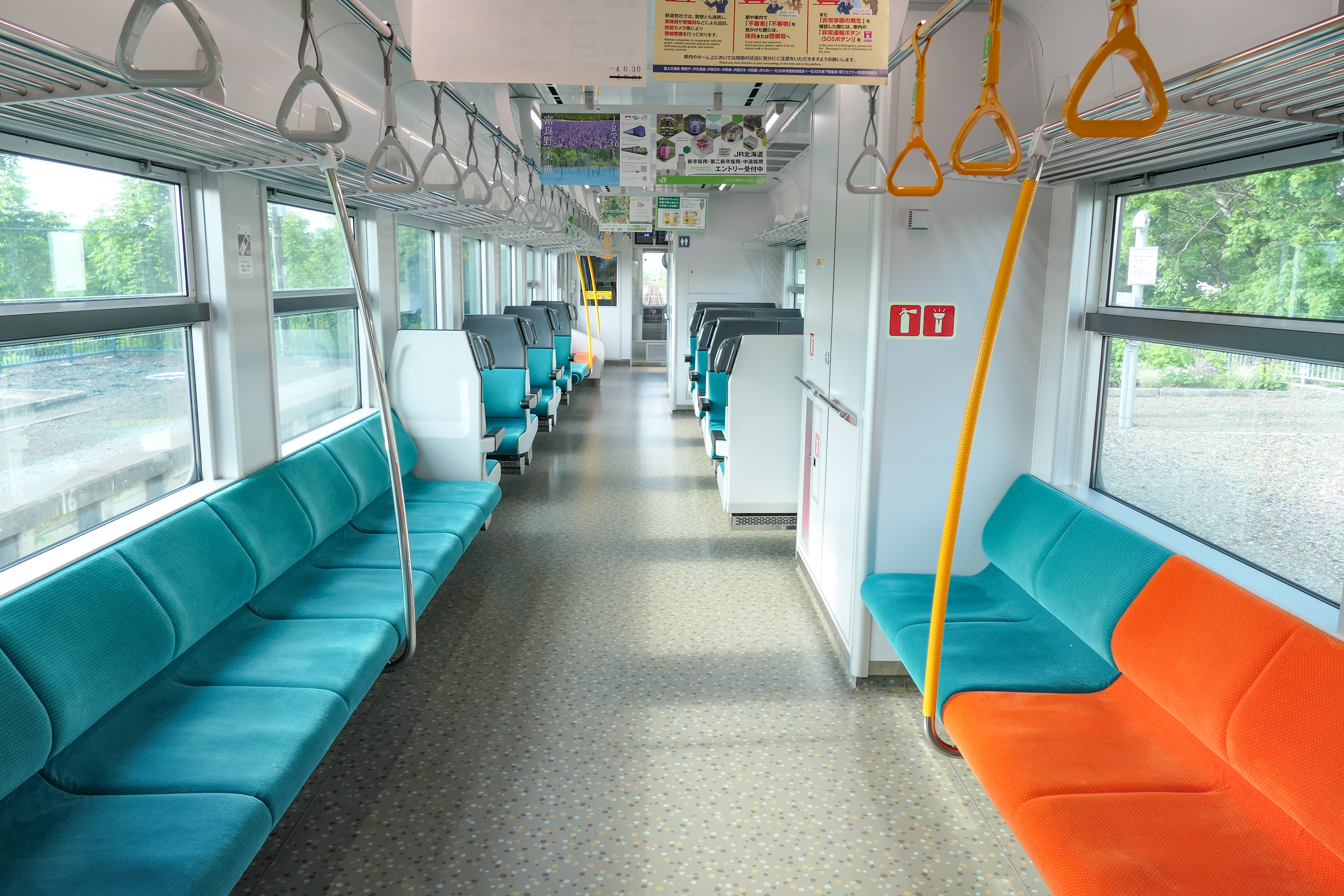
Interior

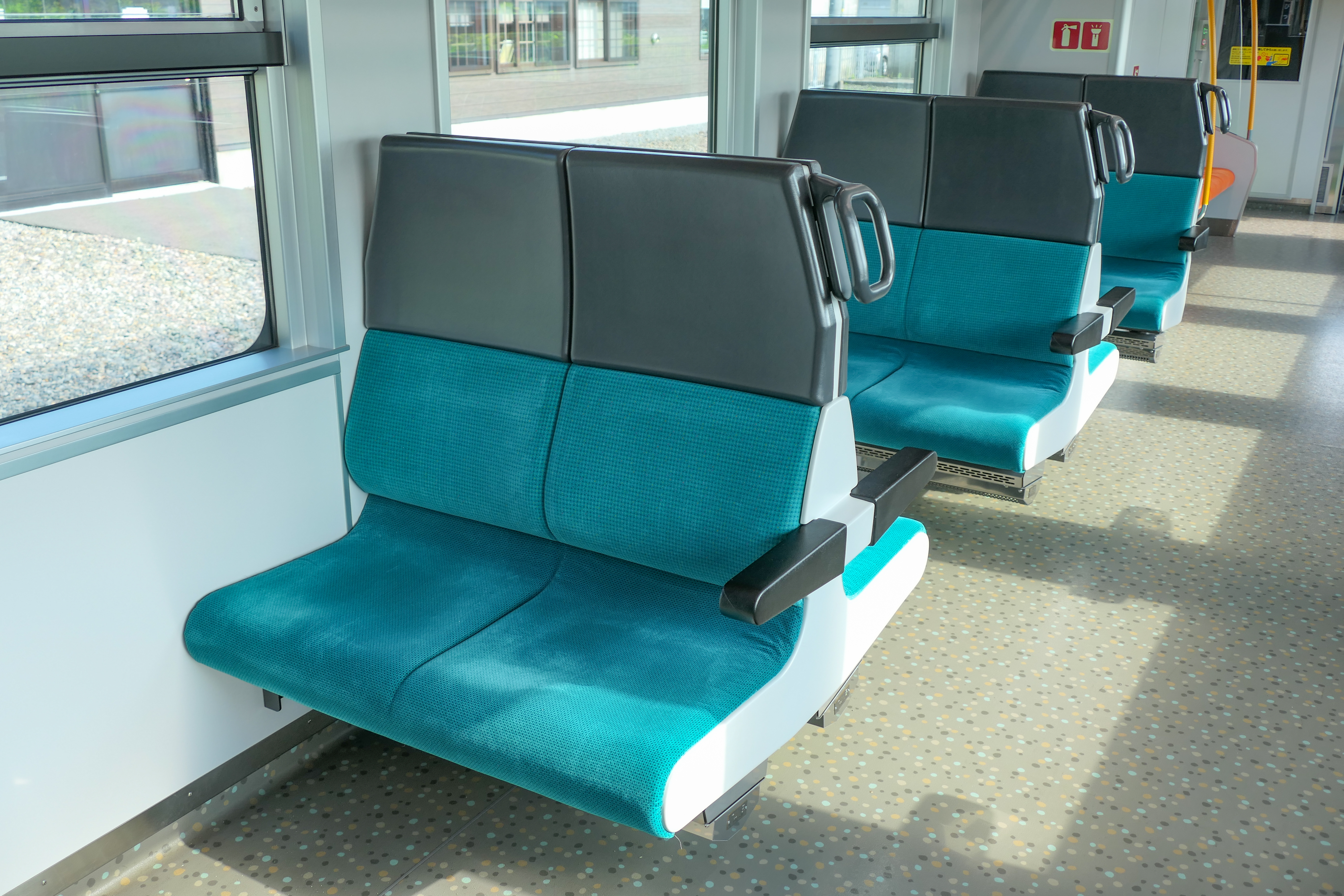
Transverse seating

== History ==
Details about the new trains were announced by JR Hokkaido on 12 July 2017. Two single-car pre-series units were delivered from the Kawasaki Heavy Industries factory in Kobe in February 2018 and underwent test-running and evaluation until March 2019. In September 2019, deliveries of the full-production units commenced and on 14 March 2020, passenger operations started with a total of 15 cars on the Hakodate Main Line between Oshamambe and Sapporo. In the fiscal years (April to March) 2020 and 2021, a total of 60 more cars are planned for construction.

From 18 March 2023, the H100 series cars are expected to be introduced on the Furano Line.

As of 16 March 2024, all Senmō Main Line and Sekihoku Main Line Local and Rapid services are also operated by H100 series cars.
