= Furano Station =

Railway station in Furano, Hokkaido, Japan

Coordinates: 43.346872°N 142.391278°E

T30 Furano Station 富良野駅
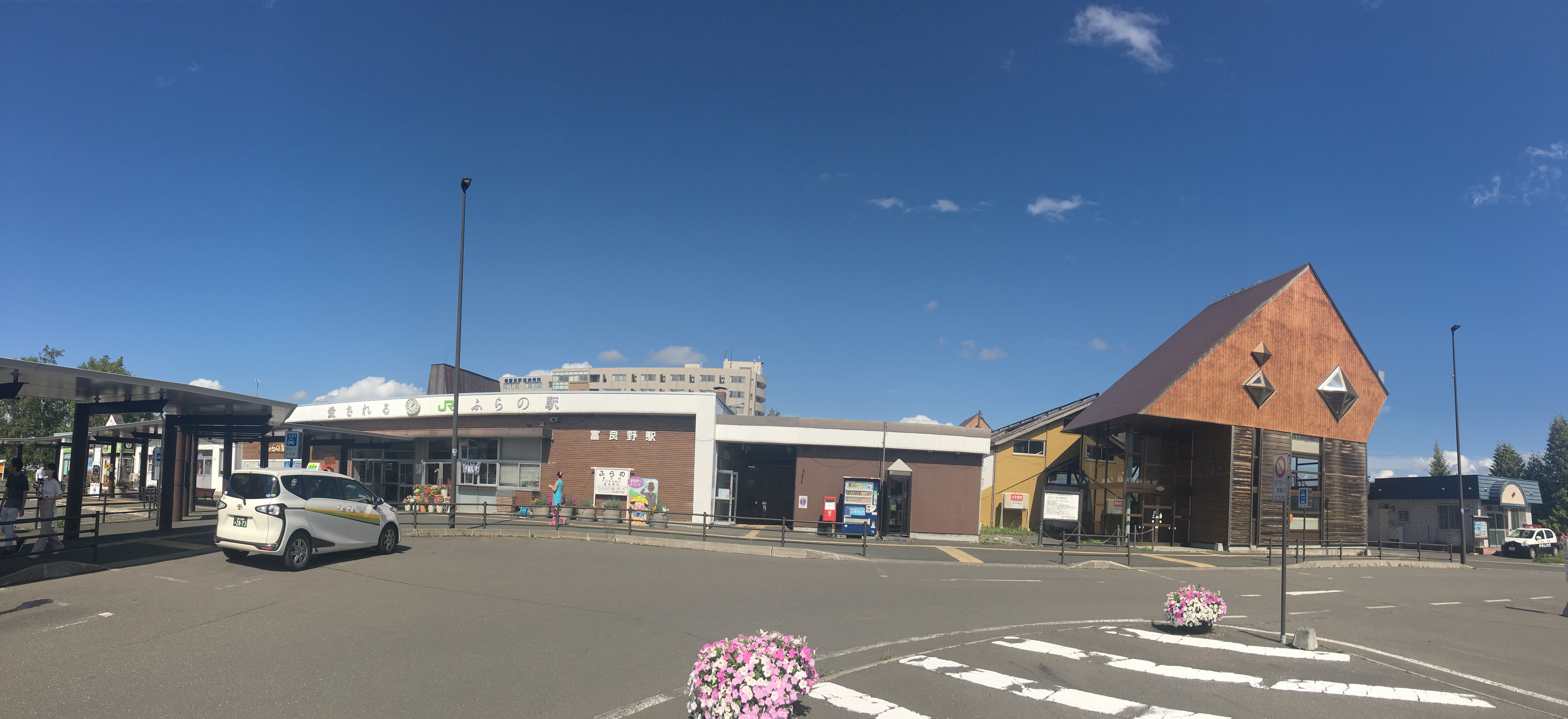
- The station building and forecourt in August 2022

General information
- Location: 1 Hinodecho, Furano City, Hokkaido Prefecture; Japan
- Operator: JR Hokkaido
- Lines: Nemuro Main Line; Furano Line
- Distance: 54.6 km (33.9 mi) from Takikawa
- Platforms: 2 island platforms
- Tracks: 4
- Connections: Bus terminal

Construction
- Structure type: At grade

Other information
- Status: Staffed
- Station code: T30

History
- Opened: 1 August 1900; 126 years ago
- Former names: Shimo-Furano (until 1942)

Passengers
- FY2013: 696 daily

Services
Preceding station	JR Hokkaido	Following station
Nokanan T28 towards Takikawa	Nemuro Main Line	Terminus
Gakuden F44 towards Asahikawa	Furano Line	Terminus
Location
- Location within Hokkaido Location within Japan

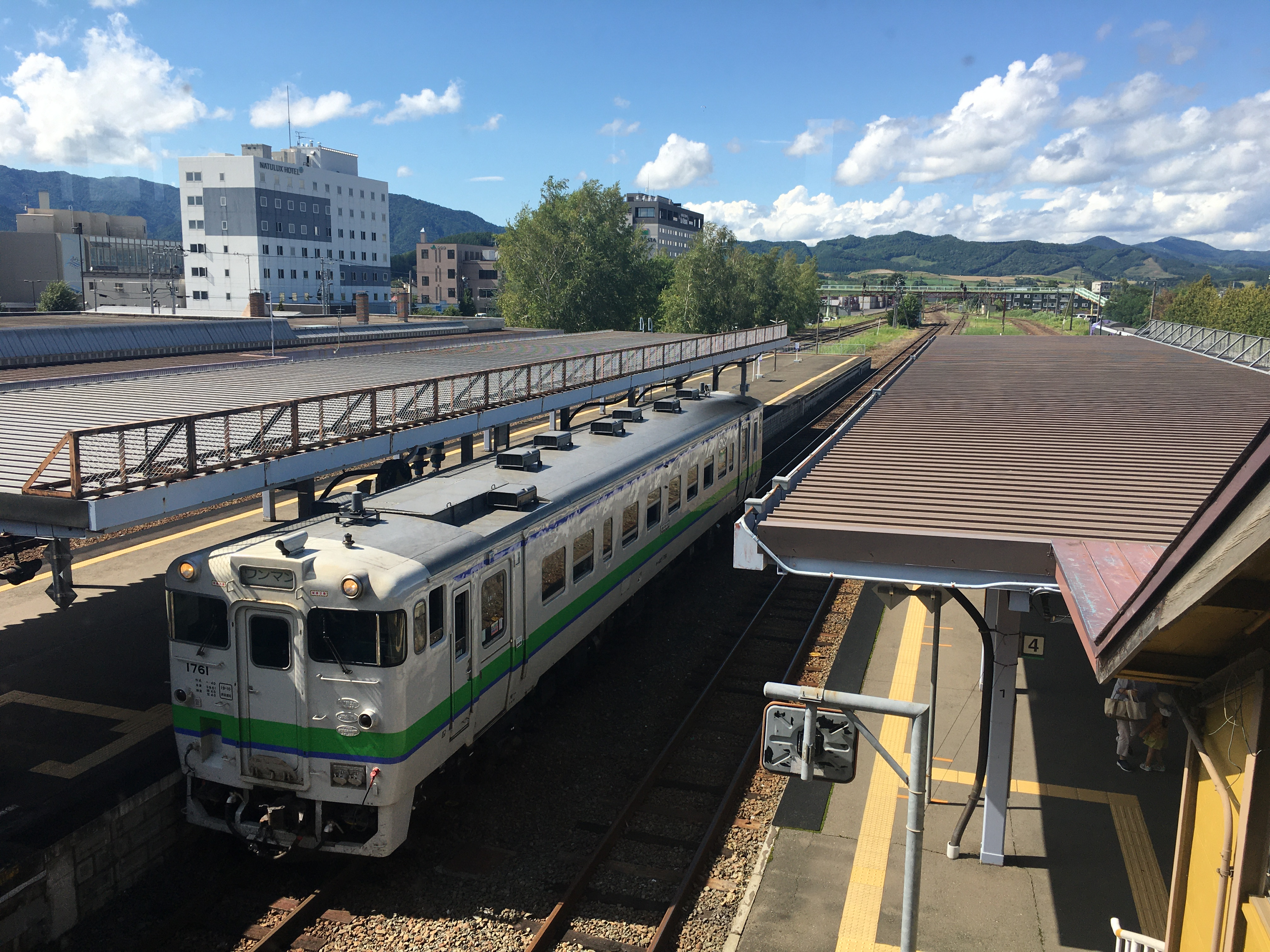
Station platforms, 2022

Furano Station (富良野駅, Furano-eki) is a railway station in Furano, Hokkaido, Japan, operated by the Hokkaido Railway Company (JR Hokkaido). The station is numbered T30.

== Lines ==
Furano Station is served by the following two lines.

- Nemuro Main Line
- Furano Line

== Station layout ==
The station has a "Midori no Madoguchi" staffed ticket office. Kitaca cannot be used at this station.

== History ==
The station opened on 2 December 1900 as Shimo-Furano Station (下富良野駅). It was renamed simply Furano Station on 1 April 1942. With the privatization of JNR on 1 April 1987, the station came under the control of JR Hokkaido.

In 2024 it was decided that the Nemuro Main Line between Furano and Shintoku, would be closed permanently effective 1 April of that year, making Furano the eastern terminus of the western section of the Nemuro Main Line.

== Surrounding area ==
- National Route 38
- National Route 237
- Furano City Office
- Hokkaido Furano High School
- Hokkaido Furano Ryokuho High School

== See also ==
- List of railway stations in Japan
