= Japan National Route 237 =

National highway in Japan

National Route 237
- 国道237号
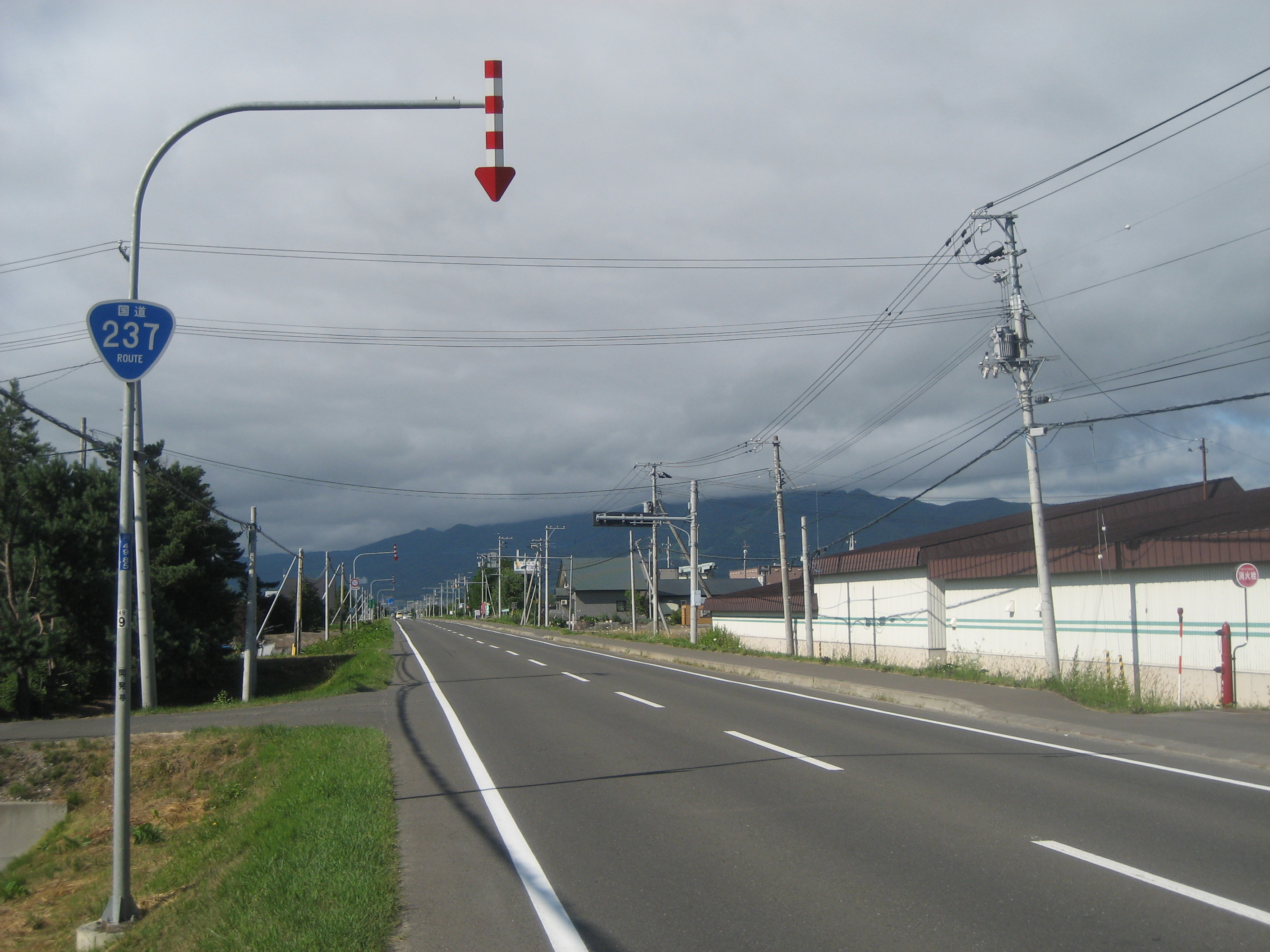

Route information
- Length: 260.0 km (161.6 mi)

Location
- Country: Japan

Highway system
- National highways of Japan; Expressways of Japan
← National Route 236	→ National Route 238

National Route 237 is a national highway of Japan connecting Asahikawa, Hokkaidō and Urakawa, Hokkaidō in Japan, with a total length of 260 km (161.56 mi).
