= List of railway stations in Japan: N =

List of railway stations in Japan

A	B	C	D	E	F	G	H	I	J	KL	M	N	O	P	R	S	T	U	W	Y	Z

This list shows the railway stations in Japan that begin with the letter N. This is a subset of the full list of railway stations in Japan.

== Station list ==
=== Na ===
Nabari Station	名張駅（なばり）
Nabata Station	菜畑駅（なばた）
Nabekura Station	鍋倉駅（なべくら）
Nabera Station	鍋原駅（なべら）
Nabeshima Station	鍋島駅（なべしま）
Nachi Station	那智駅（なち）
Nada Station	灘駅（なだ）
Nadachi Station	名立駅（なだち）
Naebo Station	苗穂駅（なえぼ）
Nagae Station	長江駅（ながえ）
Nagahama Station	長浜駅（ながはま）
Nagahara Station (Shiga)	永原駅（ながはら）
Nagahara Station (Osaka)	長原駅 (大阪府)（ながはら）
Nagahara Station (Tokyo)	長原駅 (東京都)（ながはら）
Nagahoribashi Station	長堀橋駅（ながほりばし）
Nagai Station (Yamagata)	長井駅（ながい）
Nagai Station (Osaka)	長居駅（ながい）
Nagaike Station	長池駅（ながいけ）
Nagaizumi-Nameri Station	長泉なめり駅（ながいずみなめり）
Nagakute-Kosenjō Station	長久手古戦場駅（ながくてこせんじょう）
Nagamachi Station	長町駅（ながまち）
Nagamachi-Itchōme Station	長町一丁目駅（ながまちいっちょうめ）
Nagamachi-Minami Station	長町南駅（ながまちみなみ）
Nagamine Station	長峰駅（ながみね）
Nagamori Station	長森駅（ながもり）
Naganawashiro Station	長苗代駅（ながなわしろ）
Nagano Station	長野駅（ながの）
Naganohara-Kusatsuguchi Station	長野原草津口駅（ながのはらくさつぐち）
Naganuma Station (Shizuoka)	長沼駅 (静岡県)（ながぬま）
Naganuma Station (Tokyo)	長沼駅 (東京都)（ながぬま）
Nagao Station (Kagawa)	長尾駅 (香川県)（ながお）
Nagao Station (Osaka)	長尾駅 (大阪府)（ながお）
Nagao Station (Saga)	永尾駅（ながお）
Nagaoka Station	長岡駅（ながおか）
Nagaokakyō Station	長岡京駅（ながおかきょう）
Nagaoka-Tenjin Station	長岡天神駅（ながおかてんじん）
Nagara Station	長柄駅（ながら）
Nagareyama Station	流山駅（ながれやま）
Nagareyamaonsen Station	流山温泉駅（ながれやまおんせん）
Nagareyama-centralpark Station	流山セントラルパーク駅（ながれやませんとらるぱーく）
Nagareyama Ōtakanomori Station	流山おおたかの森駅（ながれやまおおたかのもり）
Nagasaka Station	長坂駅（ながさか）
Nagasaki Station (Nagasaki)	長崎駅（ながさき）
Nagasaki-daigakumae Station	長崎大学前駅（ながさきだいがくまえ）
Nagasakiekimae Station	長崎駅前駅（ながさきえきまえ）
Nagasato Station	長里駅（ながさと）
Nagasawa Station	長沢駅（ながさわ）
Nagase Station	長瀬駅（ながせ）
Nagashima Station	長島駅（ながしま）
Nagashima Dam Station	長島ダム駅（ながしまだむ）
Nagashinojō Station	長篠城駅（ながしのじょう）
Nagasu Station	長洲駅（ながす）
Nagata Station (Chiba)	永田駅 (千葉県)（ながた）
Nagata Station (Osaka)	長田駅 (大阪府)（ながた）
Nagata Station (Saitama)	永田駅 (埼玉県)（ながた）
Nagata Station (Kobe Subway)	長田駅 (神戸市営地下鉄)（ながた）
Nagata Station (Shintetsu)	長田駅 (神戸電鉄)（ながた）
Nagatachō Station	永田町駅（ながたちょう）
Nagataki Station	長滝駅（ながたき）
Nagatani Station	長谷駅 (広島県)（ながたに）
Nagatanino Station	長谷野駅（ながたにの）
Nagato-Awano Station	長門粟野駅（ながとあわの）
Nagato-Furuichi Station	長門古市駅（ながとふるいち）
Nagato-Futami Station	長門二見駅（ながとふたみ）
Nagato-Misumi Station	長門三隅駅（ながとみすみ）
Nagato-Motoyama Station	長門本山駅（ながともとやま）
Nagato-Nagasawa Station	長門長沢駅（ながとながさわ）
Nagato-Ōi Station	長門大井駅（ながとおおい）
Nagatori Station	長鳥駅（ながとり）
Nagatoro Station	長瀞駅（ながとろ）
Nagatoshi Station	長門市駅（ながとし）
Nagatoyumoto Station	長門湯本駅（ながとゆもと）
Nagatsuta Station	長津田駅（ながつた）
Nagaura Station (Aichi)	長浦駅 (愛知県)（ながうら）
Nagaura Station (Chiba)	長浦駅 (千葉県)（ながうら）
Nagawa Station	長和駅（ながわ）
Nagaya Station	長屋駅（ながや）
Nagayama Station (Hokkaido)	永山駅（ながやま）
Nagayama Station (Aichi)	長山駅（ながやま）
Nagayo Station	長与駅（ながよ）
Nagi Station	那岐駅（なぎ）
Nagisa Station (Gifu)	渚駅 (岐阜県)（なぎさ）
Nagisa Station (Nagano)	渚駅 (長野県)（なぎさ）
Nagiso Station	南木曽駅（なぎそ）
Nagitsuji Station	椥辻駅（なぎつじ）
Nago Station	奈古駅（なご）
Nagonoura Station	長太ノ浦駅（なごのうら）
Nagose Station	名越駅（なごせ）
Nagoya Dome-mae Yada Station	ナゴヤドーム前矢田駅（なごやどーむまえやだ）
Nagoya Station	名古屋駅（なごや）
Nagoyadaigaku Station	名古屋大学駅（なごやだいがく）
Nagoya Kamotsu Terminal Station	名古屋貨物ターミナル駅（なごやかもつたーみなる）
Nagoyakō Station	名古屋港駅 (名古屋市営地下鉄)（なごやこう）
Nagoya-Minato Station	名古屋港駅 (JR貨物)（なごやみなと）
Nagusa Station	名草駅（なぐさ）
Naguwa Station	南桑駅（なぐわ）
Naha Airport Station	那覇空港駅（なはくうこう）
Naha City Hospital Station	市立病院前駅（しりつびょういんまえ）
Nahari Station	奈半利駅（なはり）
Naie Station	奈井江駅（ないえ）
Naijōshi Station	撫牛子駅（ないじょうし）
Najima Station	名島駅（なじま）
Naka Station	那加駅（なか）
Nakaaibetsu Station	中愛別駅（なかあいべつ）
Nakaarai Station	中荒井駅（なかあらい）
Nakabaru Station	中原駅（なかばる）
Nakada Station	中田駅 (神奈川県)（なかだ）
Nakafukawa Station	中深川駅（なかふかわ）
Nakafukura Station	中福良駅（なかふくら）
Nakafunyū Station	中舟生駅（なかふにゅう）
Nakafurano Station	中富良野駅（なかふらの）
Nakafutō Station (Hyogo)	中埠頭駅（なかふとう）
Nakafutō Station (Osaka)	中ふ頭駅（なかふとう）
Nakagami Station	中神駅（なかがみ）
Nakagawa Station (Kanagawa)	中川駅 (神奈川県)（なかがわ）
Nakagawa Station (Yamagata)	中川駅 (山形県)（なかがわ）
Nakagawara Station (Mie)	中川原駅（なかがわら）
Nakagawara Station (Tokyo)	中河原駅（なかがわら）
Nakagaya Station	中萱駅（なかがや）
Nakagomi Station	中込駅（なかごみ）
Naka-Gōra Station	中強羅駅（なかごうら）
Nakagoya Station	中小屋駅（なかごや）
Nakahagi Station	中萩駅（なかはぎ）
Nakahama Station	中浜駅（なかはま）
Nakahanda Station	中判田駅（なかはんだ）
Nakahata Station	中畑駅 (広島県)（なかはた）
Nakai Station	中井駅（なかい）
Nakaiburi Station	中飯降駅（なかいぶり）
Nakaisamurai Station	中井侍駅（なかいさむらい）
Naka-Itabashi Station	中板橋駅（なかいたばし）
Nakaizumi Station	中泉駅（なかいずみ）
Nakajima Station	中島駅 (愛知県)（なかじま）
Nakajimafutō Station	中島埠頭駅（なかじまふとう）
Nakajimakōen Station	中島公園駅（なかじまこうえん）
Nakajimakōen-dōri Station	中島公園通駅（なかじまこうえんどおり）
Nakajō Station	中条駅（なかじょう）
Nakakazumi Station	中加積駅（なかかづみ）
Naka-Karuizawa Station	中軽井沢駅（なかかるいざわ）
Nakakawabe Station	中川辺駅（なかかわべ）
Naka-Komono Station	中菰野駅（なかこもの）
Nakakōen Station	中公園駅（なかこうえん）
Nakama Station	中間駅（なかま）
Nakamachidai Station	仲町台駅（なかまちだい）
Nakamatsu Station	中松駅（なかまつ）
Nakamatsue Station	中松江駅（なかまつえ）
Naka-Meguro Station	中目黒駅（なかめぐろ）
Nakaminato Station	那珂湊駅（なかみなと）
Nakamita Station	中三田駅（なかみた）
Nakamiyori-Onsen Station	中三依温泉駅（なかみよりおんせん）
Nakamizuno Station	中水野駅（なかみずの）
Nakamozu Station	中百舌鳥駅（なかもず）
Nakamura Station	中村駅（なかむら）
Nakamurabashi Station	中村橋駅（なかむらばし）
Nakamura Kōen Station	中村公園駅（なかむらこうえん）
Nakamura Kuyakusho Station	中村区役所駅（なかむらくやくしょ）
Nakamura Nisseki Station	中村日赤駅（なかむらにっせき）
Nakamyō Station	中名駅（なかみょう）
Naka-Namerikawa Station	中滑川駅（なかなめりかわ）
Nakane Station	中根駅（なかね）
Nakano Station (Gunma)	中野駅 (群馬県)（なかの）
Nakano Station (Tokyo)	中野駅 (東京都)（なかの）
Nakanobu Station	中延駅（なかのぶ）
Nakanochō Station	仲ノ町駅（なかのちょう）
Nakano-Fujimicho Station	中野富士見町駅（なかのふじみちょう）
Nakanogō Station	中之郷駅（なかのごう）
Nakanohigashi Station	中野東駅（なかのひがし）
Nakanojō Station	中之条駅（なかのじょう）
Nakano-Matsukawa Station	中野松川駅（なかのまつかわ）
Nakanosakae Station	中野栄駅（なかのさかえ）
Nakano-Sakaue Station	中野坂上駅（なかのさかうえ）
Nakanosawa Station	中ノ沢駅（なかのさわ）
Nakanoshima Station (Hokkaido)	中の島駅（なかのしま）
Nakanoshima Station (Kanagawa)	中野島駅（なかのしま）
Nakanoshima Station (Osaka)	中之島駅（なかのしま）
Nakanoshinbashi Station	中野新橋駅（なかのしんばし）
Nakanoshō Station	中ノ庄駅（なかのしょう）
Nakaoguni Station	中小国駅（なかおぐに）
Naka-Okachimachi Station	仲御徒町駅（なかおかちまち）
Naka-Okazaki Station	中岡崎駅（なかおかざき）
Nakaotai Station	中小田井駅（なかおたい）
Nakasasebo Station	中佐世保駅（なかさせぼ）
Nakasato Station (Iwate)	中里駅 (岩手県)（なかさと）
Nakasato Station (Nagano)	中佐都駅（なかさと）
Nakasawa Station	中沢駅（なかさわ）
Nakaseko Station	中瀬古駅（なかせこ）
Nakashari Station	中斜里駅（なかしゃり）
Nakashima Station	中島駅 (広島県)（なかしま）
Naka-Shimminato Station	中新湊駅（なかしんみなと）
Nakashioda Station	中塩田駅（なかしおだ）
Nakashō Station	中庄駅（なかしょう）
Nakasuda Station	中須田駅（なかすだ）
Naka-Sugaya Station	中菅谷駅（なかすがや）
Nakasuji Station	中筋駅（なかすじ）
Nakasukawabata Station	中洲川端駅（なかすかわばた）
Nakata Station	中田駅 (青森県)（なかた）
Naka-Tabira Station	中田平駅（なかたびら）
Nakataku Station	中多久駅（なかたく）
Nakatoppu Station	中徳富駅（なかとっぷ）
Nakatoyo Station	中豊駅（なかとよ）
Nakatsu Station (Oita)	中津駅 (大分県)（なかつ）
Nakatsu Station (Hankyu)	中津駅 (阪急)（なかつ）
Nakatsu Station (Osaka Metro)	中津駅 (Osaka Metro)（なかつ）
Naka-Tsubata Station	中津幡駅（なかつばた）
Nakatsuchi Station	中土駅（なかつち）
Nakatsugawa Station	中津川駅（なかつがわ）
Nakatsuma Station	中妻駅（なかつま）
Nakatsuno Station	中角駅（なかつの）
Nakaura Station	中浦駅（なかうら）
Nakaurawa Station	中浦和駅（なかうらわ）
Nakayagi Station	中八木駅（なかやぎ）
Nakayama Station (Kanagawa)	中山駅 (神奈川県)（なかやま）
Nakayamadaira-Onsen Station	中山平温泉駅（なかやまだいらおんせん）
Nakayamadera Station	中山寺駅（なかやまでら）
Naka-Yamaga Station	中山香駅（なかやまが）
Nakayamaguchi Station	中山口駅（なかやまぐち）
Nakayamajuku Station	中山宿駅（なかやまじゅく）
Nakayama-kannon Station	中山観音駅（なかやまかんのん）
Nakazakichō Station	中崎町駅（なかざきちょう）
Nakazato Station	中里駅 (長崎県)（なかざと）
Nakofunakata Station	那古船形駅（なこふなかた）
Nakoso Station	勿来駅（なこそ）
Namamugi Station	生麦駅（なまむぎ）
Namaze Station	生瀬駅（なまぜ）
Namazuta Station	鯰田駅（なまずた）
Namba Station	難波駅（なんば）
Nambu-shijō Station	南部市場駅（なんぶしじょう）
Namegawa Station	滑河駅（なめがわ）
Namegawa Island Station	行川アイランド駅（なめがわアイランド）
Namerikawa Station	滑川駅（なめりかわ）
Namezu Station	滑津駅（なめづ）
Namie Station	浪江駅（なみえ）
Namihana Station	浪花駅（なみはな）
Namiita-Kaigan Station	浪板海岸駅（なみいたかいがん）
Namikata Station	波方駅（なみかた）
Namikawa Station	並河駅（なみかわ）
Namiki-chūō Station	並木中央駅（なみきちゅうおう）
Namikikita Station	並木北駅（なみききた）
Namino Station	波野駅（なみの）
Namioka Station	浪岡駅（なみおか）
Nanae Station	七飯駅（ななえ）
Nanaehama Station	七重浜駅（ななえはま）
Nanai Station	七井駅（なない）
Nanakōdai Station	七光台駅（ななこうだい）
Nanakubo Station	七久保駅（ななくぼ）
Nanakuma Station	七隈駅（ななくま）
Nanao Station	七尾駅（ななお）
Nanasato Station	七里駅（ななさと）
Nanatsugatake-Tozanguchi Station	七ヶ岳登山口駅（ななつがたけとざんぐち）
Nanatsuka Station	七塚駅（ななつか）
Nanatsuya Station	七ツ屋駅（ななつや）
Nanawa Station	七和駅（ななわ）
Nangō Station	南郷駅（なんごう）
Nangō Jūhatchōme Station	南郷18丁目駅（なんごうじゅうはっちょうめ）
Nangō Jūsanchōme Station	南郷13丁目駅（なんごうじゅうさんちょうめ）
Nangō Nanachōme Station	南郷7丁目駅（なんごうななちょうめ）
Naniwabashi Station	なにわ橋駅（なにわばし）
Nanjai Station	南蛇井駅（なんじゃい）
Nanjō Station	南条駅（なんじょう）
Nankōguchi Station	南港口駅（なんこうぐち）
Nankōhigashi Station	南港東駅（なんこうひがし）
Nanukamachi Station	七日町駅（なぬかまち）
Nan'yō-Shiyakusho Station	南陽市役所駅（なんようしやくしょ）
Naoe Station	直江駅（なおえ）
Naoetsu Station	直江津駅（なおえつ）
Naokawa Station	直川駅（なおかわ）
Naomi Station	直見駅（なおみ）
Nara Station	奈良駅（なら）
Naraguchi Station	那良口駅（ならぐち）
Narahara Station	楢原駅（ならはら）
Narai Station	奈良井駅（ならい）
Narashino Station	習志野駅（ならしの）
Narawa Station	成岩駅（ならわ）
Narayama Station	平城山駅（ならやま）
Narimasu Station	成増駅（なります）
Narita Station	成田駅（なりた）
Narita Airport Terminal 1 Station	成田空港駅（なりたくうこう）
Narita Airport Terminal 2·3 Station	空港第2ビル駅（くうこうだい2ビル）
Narita Yukawa Station	成田湯川駅（なりたゆかわ）
Naritasan Station	成田山駅（なりたさん）
Naruishi Station	鳴石駅（なるいし）
Naruko-Gotenyu Station	鳴子御殿湯駅（なるこごてんゆ）
Naruko Kita Station	鳴子北駅（なるこきた）
Naruko-Onsen Station	鳴子温泉駅（なるこおんせん）
Narumi Station	鳴海駅（なるみ）
Naruo - Mukogawajoshidai-Mae Station	鳴尾・武庫川女子大前駅（なるおむこがわじょしだいまえ）
Narusawa Station	鳴沢駅（なるさわ）
Naruse Station	成瀬駅（なるせ）
Narushima Station (Gunma)	成島駅 (群馬県)（なるしま）
Narushima Station (Yamagata)	成島駅 (山形県)（なるしま）
Narutaki Station	鳴滝駅（なるたき）
Naruto Station	鳴門駅（なると）
Narutō Station	成東駅（なるとう）
Nasu-Shiobara Station	那須塩原駅（なすしおばら）
Nata Station	奈多駅（なた）
Nate Station	名手駅（なて）
Natori Station	名取駅（なとり）
Natsui Station	夏井駅（なつい）
Nawa Station (Aichi)	名和駅 (愛知県)（なわ）
Nawa Station (Tottori)	名和駅 (鳥取県)（なわ）
Nayoro Station	名寄駅（なよろ）
Nayorokōkō Station	名寄高校駅（なよろこうこう）

=== Ne ===
Nebukawa Station	根府川駅（ねぶかわ）
Nechi Station	根知駅（ねち）
Negasa Station	根笠駅（ねがさ）
Negishi Station (Fukushima)	根岸駅 (福島県)（ねぎし）
Negishi Station (Kanagawa)	根岸駅 (神奈川県)（ねぎし）
Negoya Station	根小屋駅（ねごや）
Nemoto Station	根本駅（ねもと）
Nemuro Station	根室駅（ねむろ）
Neppu Station	熱郛駅（ねっぷ）
Nerima Station	練馬駅（ねりま）
Nerima-Kasugachō Station	練馬春日町駅（ねりまかすがちょう）
Nerima-Takanodai Station	練馬高野台駅（ねりまたかのだい）
Neu Station	根雨駅（ねう）
New Chitose Airport Station	新千歳空港駅（しんちとせくうこう）
Neyagawakōen Station	寝屋川公園駅（ねやがわこうえん）
Neyagawashi Station	寝屋川市駅（ねやがわし）
Nezu Station	根津駅（ねづ）
Nezugaseki Station	鼠ヶ関駅（ねずがせき）

=== Ni ===
Nibu Station	丹生駅（にぶ）
Nibuno Station	仁豊野駅（にぶの）
Nichihara Station	日原駅（にちはら）
Nichinan Station	日南駅（にちなん）
Nichizengū Station	日前宮駅（にちぜんぐう）
Niekawa Station	贄川駅（にえかわ）
Nigata Station	仁方駅（にがた）
Nigatake Station	苦竹駅（にがたけ）
Nigatsuden Station	二月田駅（にがつでん）
Nigawa Station	仁川駅（にがわ）
Nigishima Station	二木島駅（にぎしま）
Nigiwaibashi Station	賑橋駅（にぎわいばし）
Niho Station	仁保駅（にほ）
Nihombashi Station	日本橋駅 (東京都)（にほんばし）
Nihommatsu Station	二本松駅（にほんまつ）
Nihongi Station	二本木駅（にほんぎ）
Nihongiguchi Station	二本木口駅（にほんぎぐち）
Nihon-heso-kōen Station	日本へそ公園駅（にほんへそこうえん）
Nihon-ōdōri Station	日本大通り駅（にほんおおどおり）
Nihonrain-Imawatari Station	日本ライン今渡駅（にほんらいんいまわたり）
Nihozu Station	仁保津駅（にほづ）
Nii Station (Hyogo)	新井駅 (兵庫県)（にい）
Nii Station (Mie)	新居駅（にい）
Niida Station (Fukushima)	二井田駅（にいだ）
Niida Station (Kochi)	仁井田駅 (高知県)（にいだ）
Niigata Station	新潟駅（にいがた）
Niigata-daigaku-mae Station	新潟大学前駅（にいがただいがくまえ）
Niihama Station	新居浜駅（にいはま）
Niihari Station	新治駅（にいはり）
Niikappu Station	新冠駅（にいかっぷ）
Niimi Station	新見駅（にいみ）
Niimura Station	新村駅 (長野県) （にいむら）
Niino Station	新野駅 (兵庫県)（にいの）
Niisato Station	新里駅 (群馬県)（にいさと）
Niita Station	仁井田駅 (栃木県)（にいた）
Niitsu Station	新津駅（にいつ）
Niitsuki Station	新月駅（にいつき）
Niitsuru Station	新鶴駅（にいつる）
Niiya Station	新谷駅（にいや）
Niiza Station	新座駅（にいざ）
Niiza Kamotsu Terminal Station	新座貨物ターミナル駅（にいざかもつたーみなる）
Niizaki Station	新崎駅（にいざき）
Niizato Station	新郷駅 (岡山県)（にいざと）
Nijikken Station	二十軒駅（にじっけん）
Nijino Station	虹の駅（にじの）
Nijinomatsubara Station	虹ノ松原駅（にじのまつばら）
Nijō Station (Kyoto)	二条駅（にじょう）
Nijō Station (Nara)	二上駅（にじょう）
Nijō-jinjaguchi Station	二上神社口駅（にじょうじんじゃぐち）
Nijōjōmae Station	二条城前駅（にじょうじょうまえ）
Nijōzan Station	二上山駅（にじょうざん）
Nijūbashimae Station	二重橋前駅（にじゅうばしまえ）
Nijūyonken Station	二十四軒駅（にじゅうよんけん）
Nikaho Station	仁賀保駅（にかほ）
Nikaidō Station	二階堂駅（にかいどう）
Nikenchaya Station	二軒茶屋駅（にけんちゃや）
Nikenjaya Station	二軒茶屋停留場（にけんぢゃや）
Nikenya Station	二軒屋駅（にけんや）
Niki Station	仁木駅（にき）
Nikkakagakumae Station	日華化学前駅（にっかかがくまえ）
Nikkawa Station	新川駅 (群馬県)（にっかわ）
Nikkō Station	日光駅（にっこう）
Nima Station	仁万駅（にま）
Ningyōchō Station	人形町駅（にんぎょうちょう）
Ninohe Station	二戸駅（にのへ）
Ninokuchi Station	新ノ口駅（にのくち）
Ninomiya Station	二宮駅（にのみや）
Ninose Station	二ノ瀬駅（にのせ）
Nippa Station	新羽駅（にっぱ）
Nippombashi Station	日本橋駅 (大阪府)（にっぽんばし）
Nippori Station	日暮里駅（にっぽり）
Niragawa Station	韮川駅（にらがわ）
Nirasaki Station	韮崎駅（にらさき）
Nirayama Station	韮山駅（にらやま）
Niregi Station	楡木駅（にれぎ）
Nirehara Station	楡原駅（にれはら）
Nirigahama Station	二里ヶ浜駅（にりがはま）
Nirō Station	二郎駅（にろう）
Nisato Station	新里駅 (青森県)（にさと）
Niseko Station	ニセコ駅
Nishi-Achi Station	西阿知駅（にしあち）
Nishi-Agano Station	西吾野駅（にしあがの）
Nishi-Aioi Station	西相生駅（にしあいおい）
Nishi-Akashi Station	西明石駅（にしあかし）
Nishi-Aoyama Station	西青山駅（にしあおやま）
Nishiarai Station	西新井駅（にしあらい）
Nishiaraidaishi-nishi Station	西新井大師西駅（にしあらいだいしにし）
Nishi-Arita Station	西有田駅（にしありた）
Nishi-Ashikajima Station	西海鹿島駅（にしあしかじま）
Nishi-Awakura Station	西粟倉駅（にしあわくら）
Nishibara Station	西原駅 (徳島県)（にしばら）
Nishibessho Station	西別所駅（にしべっしょ）
Nishi-Betsuin Station	西別院駅（にしべついん）
Nishi-Biwajima Station	西枇杷島駅（にしびわじま）
Nishibukuro Station	西袋駅（にしぶくろ）
Nishibun Station	西分駅（にしぶん）
Nishi-Chiba Station	西千葉駅（にしちば）
Nishichō Station	西町駅（にしちょう）
Nishi-Chōfu Station	西調布駅（にしちょうふ）
Nishidai Station (Hyogo)	西代駅（にしだい）
Nishidai Station (Tochigi)	西田井駅（にしだい）
Nishidai Station (Tokyo)	西台駅（にしだい）
Nishi-Ei Station	西頴娃駅（にしえい）
Nishi-Eifuku Station	西永福駅（にしえいふく）
Nishi-Eigashima Station	西江井ヶ島駅（にしえいがしま）
Nishifu Station	西府駅（にしふ）
Nishi-Fujinomiya Station	西富士宮駅（にしふじのみや）
Nishi-Fujiwara Station	西藤原駅（にしふじわら）
Nishi-Funabashi Station	西船橋駅（にしふなばし）
Nishi-Furukawa Station	西古川駅（にしふるかわ）
Nishi-Futami Station	西二見駅（にしふたみ）
Nishigahara Station	西ヶ原駅（にしがはら）
Nishigahara-yonchōme Station	西ヶ原四丁目駅（にしがはらよんちょうめ）
Nishigahō Station	西ヶ方駅（にしがほう）
Nishigawa Ryokudōkōen Station	西川緑道公園駅（にしがわりょくどうこうえん）
Nishigawara Station	西川原駅（にしがわら）
Nishi-Gifu Station	西岐阜駅（にしぎふ）
Nishigishi Station	西岸駅（にしぎし）
Nishi-Gobō Station	西御坊駅（にしごぼう）
Nishi-Goryō Station	西御料駅（にしごりょう）
Nishi Hatchōme Station	西8丁目駅（にしはっちょうめ）
Nishi-Hachiōji Station	西八王子駅（にしはちおうじ）
Nishi-Hamada Station	西浜田駅（にしはまだ）
Nishi-Hamanomachi Station	西浜町駅（にしはまのまち）
Nishi-Hanyū Station	西羽生駅（にしはにゅう）
Nishihara Station	西原駅 (広島県)（にしはら）
Nishiharu Station	西春駅（にしはる）
Nishiharue Heartopia Station	西春江ハートピア駅（にしはるえはーとぴあ）
Nishihata Station	西畑駅（にしはた）
Nishi-Hazu Station	西幡豆駅（にしはず）
Nishihino Station	西日野駅（にしひの）
Nishi-Hiranai Station	西平内駅（にしひらない）
Nishi-Hiroshima Station	西広島駅（にしひろしま）
Nishi-Hitoyoshi Station	西人吉駅（にしひとよし）
Nishi-Hōda Station	西這田駅（にしほうだ）
Nishi-Horibata Station	西堀端駅（にしほりばた）
Nishi-Ichinomiya Station	西一宮駅（にしいちのみや）
Nishi-Isahaya Station	西諫早駅（にしいさはや）
Nishi-Iwakuni Station	西岩国駅（にしいわくに）
Nishi-Izumi Station (Kagoshima)	西出水駅（にしいずみ）
Nishiizumi Station (Ishikawa)	西泉駅（にしいずみ）
Nishi-Izumo Station	西出雲駅（にしいずも）
Nishijin Station	西新駅（にしじん）
Nishijō Station	西条駅 (長野県)（にしじょう）
Nishi Jūgochōme Station	西15丁目駅（にしじゅうごちょうめ）
Nishi Jūhatchōme Station	西18丁目駅（にしじゅうはっちょうめ）
Nishi Jūitchōme Station	西11丁目駅（にしじゅういっちょうめ）
Nishi-Kagura Station	西神楽駅（にしかぐら）
Nishi-Kajima Station	西鹿島駅（にしかじま）
Nishi-Kakegawa Station	西掛川駅（にしかけがわ）
Nishi-Kamakura Station	西鎌倉駅（にしかまくら）
Nishi-Kanazawa Station	西金沢駅（にしかなざわ）
Nishi-Kani Station	西可児駅（にしかに）
Nishi-Kannonmachi Station	西観音町駅（にしかんのんまち）
Nishi-Karashimachō Station	西辛島町駅（にしからしまちょう）
Nishi-Karatsu Station	西唐津駅（にしからつ）
Nishi-Kasai Station	西葛西駅（にしかさい）
Nishi-Kasamatsu Station	西笠松駅（にしかさまつ）
Nishi-Kaseda Station	西笠田駅（にしかせだ）
Nishikata Station	西方駅（にしかた）
Nishi-Katakami Station	西片上駅（にしかたかみ）
Nishi-Katsumada Station	西勝間田駅（にしかつまだ）
Nishi-Kawada Station	西川田駅（にしかわだ）
Nishi-Kawagoe Station	西川越駅（にしかわごえ）
Nishi-Kawaguchi Station	西川口駅（にしかわぐち）
Nishi-Kazumi Station	西加積駅（にしかづみ）
Nishiki Station	錦駅（にしき）
Nishikichō Station	錦町駅（にしきちょう）
Nishi-Kizu Station	西木津駅（にしきづ）
Nishi-Kiga Station	西気賀駅（にしきが）
Nishikinohama Station	二色浜駅（にしきのはま）
Nishi-Kinuyama Station	西衣山駅（にしきぬやま）
Nishikioka Station	錦岡駅（にしきおか）
Nishi-Kiryū Station	西桐生駅（にしきりゅう）
Nishi-Kitami Station	西北見駅（にしきたみ）
Nishikoba Station	西木場駅（にしこば）
Nishi-Kobayashi Station	西小林駅（にしこばやし）
Nishi-Koizumi Station	西小泉駅（にしこいずみ）
Nishi-Kokubunji Station	西国分寺駅（にしこくぶんじ）
Nishi-Kokura Station	西小倉駅（にしこくら）
Nishi-Koyama Station	西小山駅（にしこやま）
Nishi-Kozakai Station	西小坂井駅（にしこざかい）
Nishikujō Station	西九条駅（にしくじょう）
Nishi-Kumamoto Station	西熊本駅（にしくまもと）
Nishi-Kunitachi Station	西国立駅（にしくにたち）
Nishi-Kurisu Station	西栗栖駅（にしくりす）
Nishi-Kurosaki Station	西黒崎駅（にしくろさき）
Nishi-Kuwana Station	西桑名駅（にしくわな）
Nishikyōgoku Station	西京極駅（にしきょうごく）
Nishi-Maeda Station	西前田駅（にしまえだ）
Nishi-Magome Station	西馬込駅（にしまごめ）
Nishi-Maiko Station	西舞子駅（にしまいこ）
Nishi-Maizuru Station	西舞鶴駅（にしまいづる）
Nishi-Matsuida Station	西松井田駅（にしまついだ）
Nishi-Matsumoto Station	西松本駅（にしまつもと）
Nishi-Mattō Station	西松任駅（にしまっとう）
Nishime Station	西目駅（にしめ）
Nishi-Memambetsu Station	西女満別駅（にしめまんべつ）
Nishi-Miyakonojō Station	西都城駅（にしみやこのじょう）
Nishi-Miyoshi Station	西三次駅（にしみよし）
Nishi-Mizuho Station	西瑞穂駅（にしみずほ）
Nishi-Motomachi Station	西元町駅（にしもとまち）
Nishi-Mukō Station	西向日駅（にしむこう）
Nishimuta Station	西牟田駅（にしむた）
Nishinada Station	西灘駅（にしなだ）
Nishi-Nagahori Station	西長堀駅（にしながほり）
Nishinagata Yurinosato Station	西長田ゆりの里駅（にしながたゆりのさと）
Nishinaka Station	西中駅（にしなか）
Nishinakadōri Station	西中通駅（にしなかどおり）
Nishinakajima-Minamigata Station	西中島南方駅（にしなかじまみなみがた）
Nishi-Nakano Station	西中野駅（にしなかの）
Nishi-Namerikawa Station	西滑川駅（にしなめりかわ）
Nishi-Nasuno Station	西那須野駅（にしなすの）
Nishi Nijūhatchōme Station	西28丁目駅（にしにじゅうはっちょうめ）
Nishi-Nippori Station	西日暮里駅（にしにっぽり）
Nishi-Nobuto Station	西登戸駅（にしのぶと）
Nishi-Nojiri Station	西野尻駅（にしのじり）
Nishinokuchi Station	西ノ口駅（にしのくち）
Nishinokyō Station	西ノ京駅（にしのきょう）
Nishinomiya Station (JR West)	西宮駅 (JR西日本)（にしのみや）
Nishinomiya Station (Hanshin)	西宮駅 (阪神)（にしのみや）
Nishinomiya-kitaguchi Station	西宮北口駅（にしのみやきたぐち）
Nishinomiya-Najio Station	西宮名塩駅（にしのみやなじお）
Nishinoshō Station	西ノ庄駅（にしのしょう）
Nishi-Nyūzen Station	西入善駅（にしにゅうぜん）
Nishio Station	西尾駅（にしお）
Nishi-Obihiro Station	西帯広駅（にしおびひろ）
Nishioe Station	西麻植駅（にしおえ）
Nishi-Ogikubo Station	西荻窪駅（にしおぎくぼ）
Nishioguchi Station	西尾口駅（にしおぐち）
Nishi-Okayama Station	西岡山駅（にしおかやま）
Nishi-Okazaki Station	西岡崎駅（にしおかざき）
Nishi-Ōchi Station	西相知駅（にしおうち）
Nishi-Ōgaki Station	西大垣駅（にしおおがき）
Nishi-Ōgata Station	西大方駅（にしおおがた）
Nishi-Ōhara Station	西大原駅（にしおおはら）
Nishiōhashi Station	西大橋駅（にしおおはし）
Nishi-Ōi Station	西大井駅（にしおおい）
Nishi-Ōita Station	西大分駅（にしおおいた）
Nishiōji Station	西大路駅（にしおおじ）
Nishiōji Oike Station	西大路御池駅（にしおおじおいけ）
Nishiōji-Sanjō Station	西大路三条駅（にしおおじさんじょう）
Nishi-Ōjima Station	西大島駅（にしおおじま）
Nishi-Ōmiya Station	西大宮駅（にしおおみや）
Nishi-Ōsaki Station	西大崎駅（にしおおさき）
Nishi-Ōtaki Station	西大滝駅（にしおおたき）
Nishi-Ōte Station	西大手駅（にしおおて）
Nishi-Ōtsuka Station	西大塚駅（にしおおつか）
Nishi-Ōya Station	西大家駅（にしおおや）
Nishi-Ōyama Station	西大山駅（にしおおやま）
Nishi-Ōzu Station	西大洲駅（にしおおず）
Nishi-Rubeshibe Station	西留辺蘂駅（にしるべしべ）
Nishi-Sabae Station	西鯖江駅（にしさばえ）
Nishi-Sagae Station	西寒河江駅（にしさがえ）
Nishi-Sakawa Station	西佐川駅（にしさかわ）
Nishi-Samani Station	西様似駅（にしさまに）
Nishi-Sanso Station	西三荘駅（にしさんそう）
Nishisato Station	西里駅（にしさと）
Nishi-Seiwa Station	西聖和駅（にしせいわ）
Nishi-Sendai-Hairando Station	西仙台ハイランド駅（にしせんだいはいらんど）
Nishisen Jūichijō Station	西線11条駅（にしせんじゅういちじょう）
Nishisen Jūrokujō Station	西線16条駅（にしせんじゅうろくじょう）
Nishisen Jūyojō Station	西線14条駅（にしせんじゅうよじょう）
Nishisen Kujō Asahiyama-kōen-dōri Station	西線9条旭山公園通駅（にしせんくじょうあさひやまこうえんどおり）
Nishisen Rokujō Station	西線6条駅（にしせんろくじょう）
Nishi-Shibata Station	西新発田駅（にししばた）
Nishi-Shikama Station	西飾磨駅（にししかま）
Nishi-Shimmachi Station	西新町駅（にししんまち）
Nishi-Shinjuku Station	西新宿駅（にししんじゅく）
Nishi-Shinjuku Gochōme Station	西新宿五丁目駅（にししんじゅくごちょうめ）
Nishi Shinminato Station	西新湊駅（にししんみなと）
Nishi-Shiogama Station	西塩釜駅（にししおがま）
Nishi-Shiroi Station	西白井駅（にししろい）
Nishi-Shoro Station	西庶路駅（にししょろ）
Nishi-Soeda Station	西添田駅（にしそえだ）
Nishi-Sugamo Station	西巣鴨駅（にしすがも）
Nishi-Suzurandai Station	西鈴蘭台駅（にしすずらんだい）
Nishi-Tabira Station	西田平駅（にしたびら）
Nishi-Tachiarai Station	西太刀洗駅（にしたちあらい）
Nishi-Tachikawa Station	西立川駅（にしたちかわ）
Nishi-Taishidō Station	西太子堂駅（にしたいしどう）
Nishi-Takakura Station	西高蔵駅（にしたかくら）
Nishi-Takanosu Station	西鷹巣駅（にしたかのす）
Nishi-Takaoka Station	西高岡駅（にしたかおか）
Nishi-Takashimadaira Station	西高島平駅（にしたかしまだいら）
Nishi-Takasu Station	西高須駅（にしたかす）
Nishi-Takaya Station	西高屋駅（にしたかや）
Nishitakisawa Station	西滝沢駅（にしたきさわ）
Nishitanabe Station	西田辺駅（にしたなべ）
Nishi-Tawaramoto Station	西田原本駅（にしたわらもと）
Nishi-Tengachaya Station	西天下茶屋駅（にしてんがちゃや）
Nishitetsu Chihaya Station	西鉄千早駅（にしてつちはや）
Nishitetsu Fukuma Station	西鉄福間駅（にしてつふくま）
Nishitetsu Futsukaichi Station	西鉄二日市駅（にしてつふつかいち）
Nishitetsu Ginsui Station	西鉄銀水駅（にしてつぎんすい）
Nishitetsu Gojō Station	西鉄五条駅（にしてつごじょう）
Nishitetsu Hirao Station	西鉄平尾駅（にしてつひらお）
Nishitetsu Kashii Station	西鉄香椎駅（にしてつかしい）
Nishitetsu Koga Station	西鉄古賀駅（にしてつこが）
Nishitetsu Kurume Station	西鉄久留米駅（にしてつくるめ）
Nishitetsu Nakashima Station	西鉄中島駅（にしてつなかしま）
Nishitetsu Ogōri Station	西鉄小郡駅（にしてつおごおり）
Nishitetsu Shingū Station	西鉄新宮駅（にしてつしんぐう）
Nishitetsu Wataze Station	西鉄渡瀬駅（にしてつわたぜ）
Nishitetsu Yanagawa Station	西鉄柳川駅（にしてつやながわ）
Nishi-Tokorozawa Station	西所沢駅（にしところざわ）
Nishitomii Station	西富井駅（にしとみい）
Nishi-Tomioka Station	西富岡駅（にしとみおか）
Nishi-Toride Station	西取手駅（にしとりで）
Nishi-Toyama Station	西富山駅（にしとやま）
Nishi-Tsubame Station	西燕駅（にしつばめ）
Nishi-Tsuruga Station	西敦賀駅（にしつるが）
Nishi-Ueda Station	西上田駅（にしうえだ）
Nishi-Umeda Station	西梅田駅（にしうめだ）
Nishi-Uozu Station	西魚津駅（にしうおづ）
Nishiura Station	西浦駅（にしうら）
Nishi-Urakami Station	西浦上駅（にしうらかみ）
Nishi-Urawa Station	西浦和駅（にしうらわ）
Nishi-Wada Station	西和田駅（にしわだ）
Nishi-Wakamatsu Station	西若松駅（にしわかまつ）
Nishiwakishi Station	西脇市駅（にしわきし）
Nishi-Waseda Station	西早稲田駅（にしわせだ）
Nishiya Station	西谷駅（にしや）
Nishi-Yaizu Station	西焼津駅（にしやいづ）
Nishiyama Station (Fukuoka)	西山駅 (福岡県)（にしやま）
Nishiyama Station (Niigata)	西山駅 (新潟県)（にしやま）
Nishiyamaguchi Station	西山口駅（にしやまぐち）
Nishiyamakōen Station	西山公園駅（にしやまこうえん）
Nishiyama Tennozan Station	西山天王山駅（にしやまてんのうざん）
Nishi-Yamana Station	西山名駅（にしやまな）
Nishiyashiki Station	西屋敷駅（にしやしき）
Nishi-Yokohama Station	西横浜駅（にしよこはま）
Nishi Yonchōme Station	西4丁目駅（にしよんちょうめ）
Nishi-Yonezawa Station	西米沢駅（にしよねざわ）
Nishi-Yoshii Station	西吉井駅（にしよしい）
Nishōishi Station	二升石駅（にしょういし）
Nissei-Chūō Station	日生中央駅（にっせいちゅうおう）
Nisseki-byōinmae Station	日赤病院前駅（にっせきびょういんまえ）
Nisshin Station (Aichi)	日進駅 (愛知県)（にっしん）
Nisshin Station (Hokkaido)	日進駅 (北海道)（にっしん）
Nisshin Station (Saitama)	日進駅 (埼玉県)（にっしん）
Nitanai Station	似内駅（にたない）
Nitta Station (Fukushima)	新田駅 (福島県)（にった）
Nitta Station (Miyagi)	新田駅 (宮城県)（にった）
Nittaki Station	日立木駅（にったき）
Nittano Station	新田野駅（にったの）
Nittazuka Station	新田塚駅（にったづか）
Niwasaka Station	庭坂駅（にわさか）
Niwase Station	庭瀬駅（にわせ）
Niyama Station	仁山駅（にやま）

=== No ===
Nō Station	能生駅（のう）
Nobeoka Station	延岡駅（のべおか）
Nobeyama Station	野辺山駅（のべやま）
Nobiru Station	野蒜駅（のびる）
Noboribetsu Station	登別駅（のぼりべつ）
Noborito Station	登戸駅（のぼりと）
Nobukata Station	延方駅（のぶかた）
Nobuki Station	信木駅（のぶき）
Nobusha Station	信砂駅（のぶしゃ）
Nochi Station	野馳駅（のち）
Noda Station (JR West)	野田駅 (JR西日本)（のだ）
Noda Station (Hanshin)	野田駅 (阪神)（のだ）
Nodagō Station	野田郷駅（のだごう）
Nodahanshin Station	野田阪神駅（のだはんしん）
Nodajō Station	野田城駅（のだじょう）
Nodaoi Station	野田生駅（のだおい）
Nodashi Station	野田市駅（のだし）
Noda-Shimmachi Station	野田新町駅（のだしんまち）
Noda-Tamagawa Station	野田玉川駅（のだたまがわ）
Noe Station	野江駅（のえ）
Noe-Uchindai Station	野江内代駅（のえうちんだい）
Nōgakubumae Station	農学部前駅（のうがくぶまえ）
Nogami Station	野上駅（のがみ）
Nogamihara Station	野上原駅（のがみはら）
Nogata Station	野方駅（のがた）
Nōgata Station	直方駅（のおがた）
Nogi Station (Shimane)	乃木駅（のぎ）
Nogi Station (Tochigi)	野木駅（のぎ）
Nogisawa Station	野木沢駅（のぎさわ）
Nogizaka Station	乃木坂駅（のぎざか）
Noheji Station	野辺地駅（のへじ）
Noichi Station	のいち駅
Nojimakōen Station	野島公園駅（のじまこうえん）
Nojiri Station	野尻駅（のじり）
Nokanan Station	野花南駅（のかなん）
Noke Station	野芥駅（のけ）
Nōkendai Station	能見台駅（のうけんだい）
Noma Station	野間駅（のま）
Nomachi Station	野町駅（のまち）
Nōmachi Station	能町駅（のうまち）
Nomi-Neagari Station	能美根上駅（のみねあがり）
Nonai Station	野内駅（のない）
Nonaka Station	野中駅（のなか）
Nonami Station	野並駅（のなみ）
Nonodake Station	のの岳駅（ののだけ）
Nonoichi Station (JR West)	野々市駅 (JR西日本)（ののいち）
Nonoichi Station (Hokuriku Railway)	野々市駅 (北陸鉄道)（ののいち）
Nonoichi-Kōdaimae Station	野々市工大前駅（ののいちこうだいまえ）
Nonokuchi Station	野々口駅（ののくち）
Norfolk Hiroba Station	ノーフォーク広場駅（のーふぉーくひろば）
Nopporo Station	野幌駅（のっぽろ）
Nose Station	能瀬駅（のせ）
Noseki Station	野跡駅（のせき）
Noshi Station	野志駅（のし）
Noshiro Station	能代駅（のしろ）
Notobe Station	能登部駅（のとべ）
Notogawa Station	能登川駅（のとがわ）
Noto-Kashima Station	能登鹿島駅（のとかしま）
Noto-Nakajima Station	能登中島駅（のとなかじま）
Noto-Ninomiya Station	能登二宮駅（のとにのみや）
Noya Station	野矢駅（のや）
Nozaki Station (Osaka)	野崎駅 (大阪府)（のざき）
Nozaki Station (Tochigi)	野崎駅 (栃木県)（のざき）
Nozato Station	野里駅（のざと）
Nozawa Station	野沢駅（のざわ）
Nozoki Station	及位駅（のぞき）
Nukada Station	額田駅 (茨城県)（ぬかだ）

=== Nu ===
Nuka-Jūtakumae Station	額住宅前駅（ぬかじゅうたくまえ）
Nukanan Station	糠南駅（ぬかなん）
Nukata Station	額田駅 (大阪府)（ぬかた）
Nukazawa Station	糠沢駅（ぬかざわ）
Nukumi Station	生見駅（ぬくみ）
Nukuta Station	温田駅（ぬくた）
Numabe Station	沼部駅（ぬまべ）
Numabukuro Station	沼袋駅（ぬまぶくろ）
Numakubo Station	沼久保駅（ぬまくぼ）
Numanohata Station	沼ノ端駅（ぬまのはた）
Numanosawa Station	沼ノ沢駅（ぬまのさわ）
Numata Station	沼田駅（ぬまた）
Numazu Station	沼津駅（ぬまづ）
Nunobe Station	布部駅（ぬのべ）
Nunohara Station	布原駅（ぬのはら）
Nunoichi Station	布市駅（ぬのいち）
Nunose Station	布忍駅（ぬのせ）
Nunoshida Station	布師田駅（ぬのしだ）
Nunozaki Station	布崎駅（ぬのざき）
Nuttari Station	沼垂駅（ぬったり）
Nyūgawa Station (Ehime)	壬生川駅（にゅうがわ）
Nyūgawa Station (Mie)	丹生川駅（にゅうがわ）
Nyūno Station	入野駅 (広島県)（にゅうの）
Nyūzen Station	入善駅（にゅうぜん）
