= Kamifukawa Station =

Railway station in Hiroshima, Japan

Coordinates: 34°28′33.4″N 132°33′44.6″E

Kamifukawa Station 上深川駅
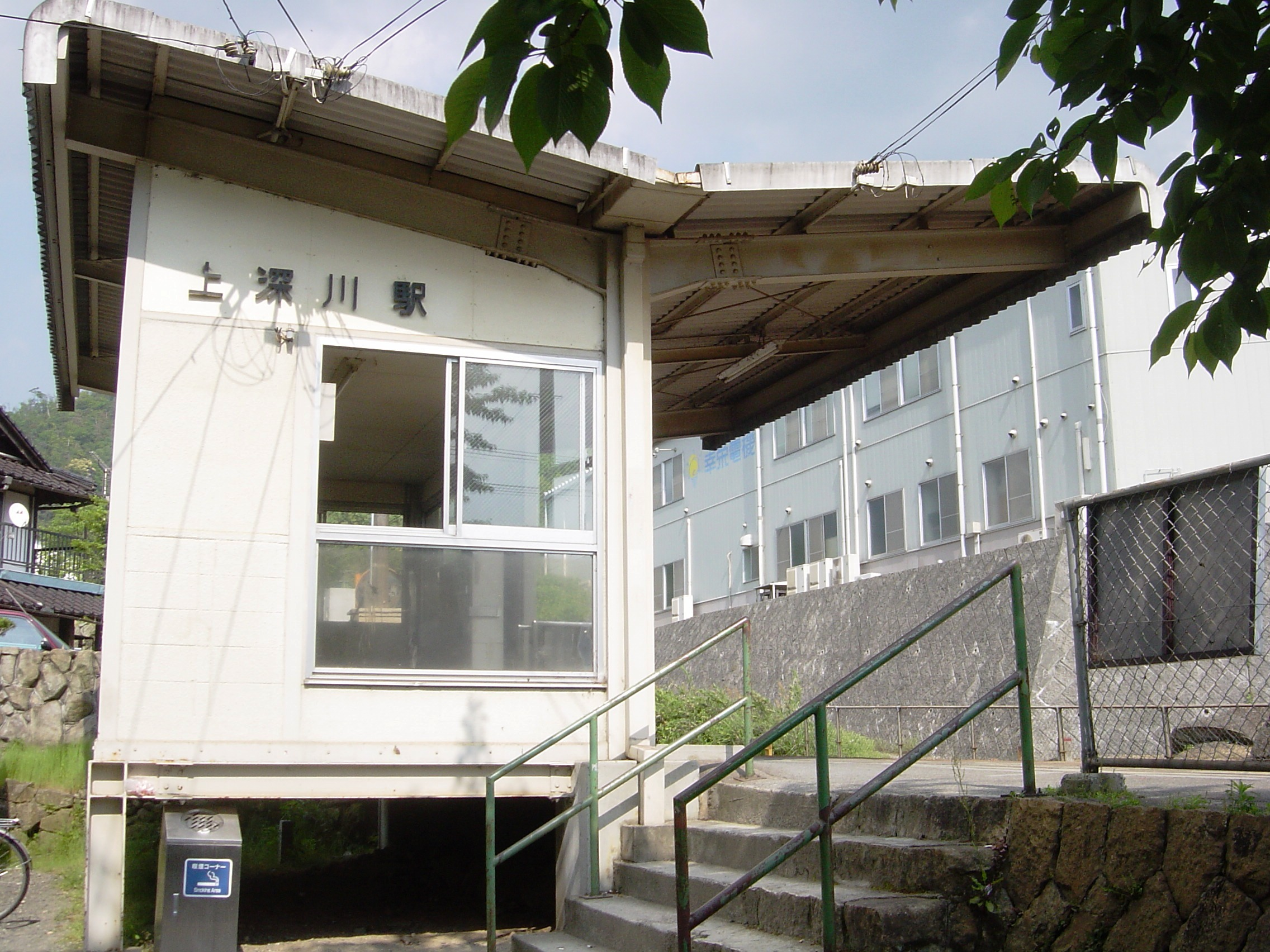
- Kamifukawa Station building (May 15, 2005).

General information
- Location: Asakita, Hiroshima, Hiroshima; Japan
- Operator: JR West
- Line: Geibi Line

History
- Opened: 1929
Location

Kamifukawa Station (上深川駅, Kami-Fukawa-eki) is a JR West Geibi Line station located in Karuga-chō, Asakita-ku, Hiroshima, Hiroshima Prefecture, Japan. The 124m Dakiiwa Tunnel is located on the Miyoshi side of the station.

== History ==
- 1929-03-20: Kamifukawa Station opens
- 1941-08-10: Kamifukawa Station ceases operation
- 1948-08-10: Kamifukawa Station begins operation once again
- 1987-04-01: Japanese National Railways is privatized, and Kamifukawa Station becomes a JR West station

== Station building and platforms ==
Kamifukawa Station features one side platform capable of handling one line. Trains bound for Shiwaguchi and Miyoshi are handled on the upper end (上り) of the platform, and trains bound for Hiroshima are handled on the lower end (下り). The station building, as with the building at Nakafukawa Station, is used as convenient meeting place for the residents of the surrounding area. The station is unstaffed but features an automated ticket vending machine.

=== Environs ===
- Hiroshima Municipal Kariogawa Elementary School
- Hiroshima Municipal Fukunoki Elementary School
- Hiroshima Municipal Fukunoki Junior High School
- Hiroshima Municipal Shinrin Park
- Kōyō Driving School (高陽自動車学校)
- Nakayama
- Shiimurayama
- Nabetsuchi Pass
- Misasa River

=== Highway access ===
- Chūgoku Expressway Hiroshima Higashi Interchange
- Hiroshima Prefectural Route 37 (Hiroshima-Miyoshi Route)
- Hiroshima Prefectural Route 70 (Hiroshima-Nakashima Route)

== Connecting lines ==
All lines are JR West lines.

Geibi Line
Miyoshi Express

No stop

Commuter Liner

No stop

Miyoshi Liner/Local

Karuga Station — Kamifukawa Station — Nakafukawa Station
