= Nishi-Ōmiya Station =

Railway station in Saitama, Japan

Nishi-Ōmiya Station 西大宮駅
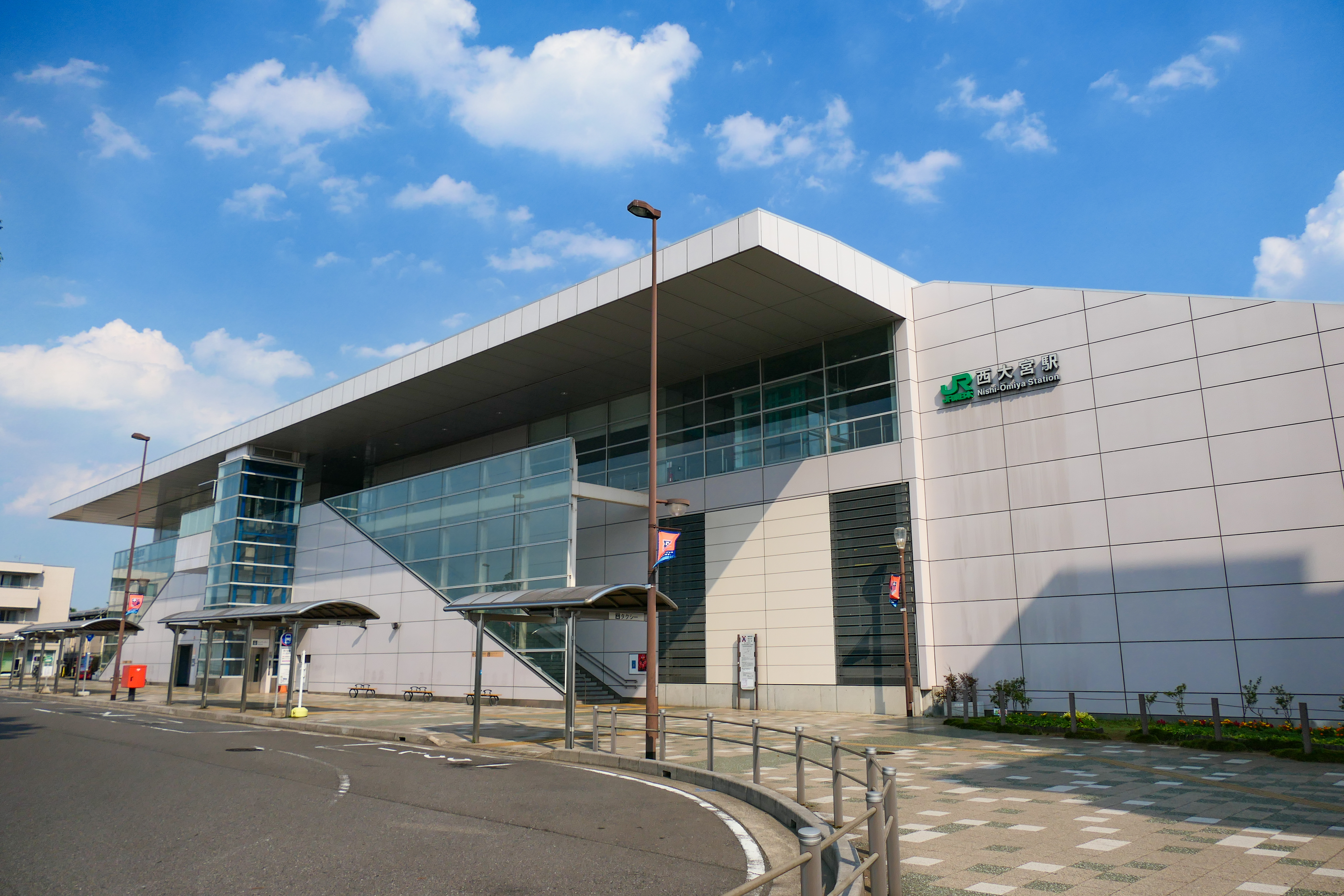
- The North side of the station in June 2022

General information
- Location: 3582–4 Sashiōgi, Nishi-ku, Saitama-shi, Saitama-ken 331–0047; Japan
- Coordinates: 35°55′20″N 139°34′47″E
- Operator: JR East
- Line: ■ Kawagoe Line
- Distance: 6.3 km from Ōmiya
- Platforms: 2 side platforms
- Tracks: 2
- Connections: Bus stop

Other information
- Status: Staffed
- Website: Official website

History
- Opened: 14 March 2009

Passengers
- FY2019: 11,158 daily

Services
Preceding station	JR East	Following station
Sashiōgi towards Kawagoe	Kawagoe Line Commuter Rapid Rapid Local	Nisshin towards Ōmiya
Location
- Location within Saitama Prefecture Location within Japan

Nishi-Ōmiya Station (西大宮駅, Nishi-Ōmiya-eki; lit. "West Ōmiya Station") is a passenger railway station on the Kawagoe Line located in Nishi-ku, Saitama, Saitama Prefecture, Japan, operated by East Japan Railway Company (JR East).

== Lines ==
Nishi-Ōmiya Station is served by the Kawagoe Line between Kawagoe and Ōmiya, and is located 6.3 km from Ōmiya. Most trains continue beyond Ōmiya on the Saikyo Line to Shinjuku and Shin-Kiba. Services operate every 20 minutes during the daytime.

== Station layout ==
The station has two side platforms serving two tracks, with an elevated station building located above the platforms. The station is staffed.

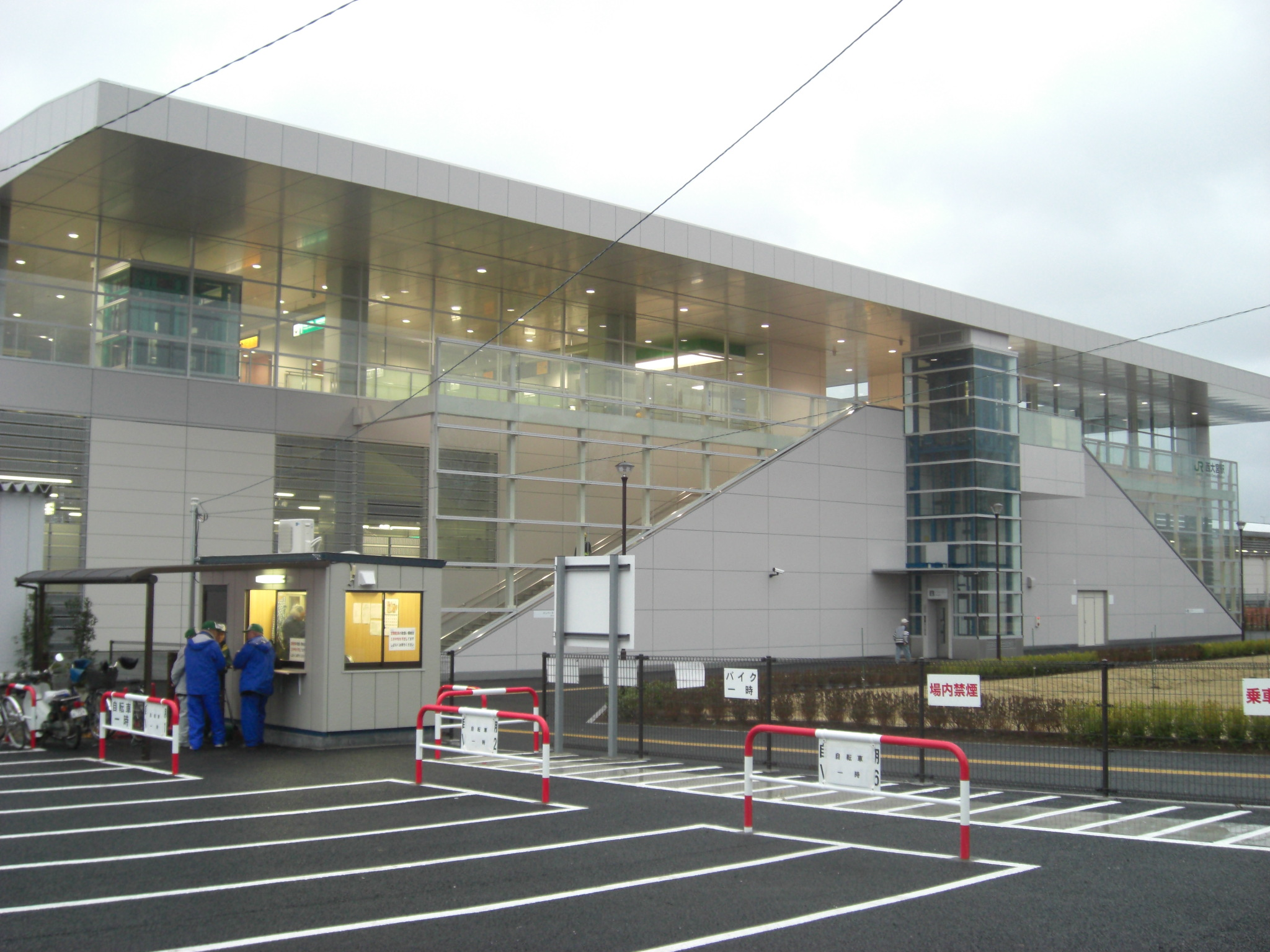
The south side of the station in June 2009

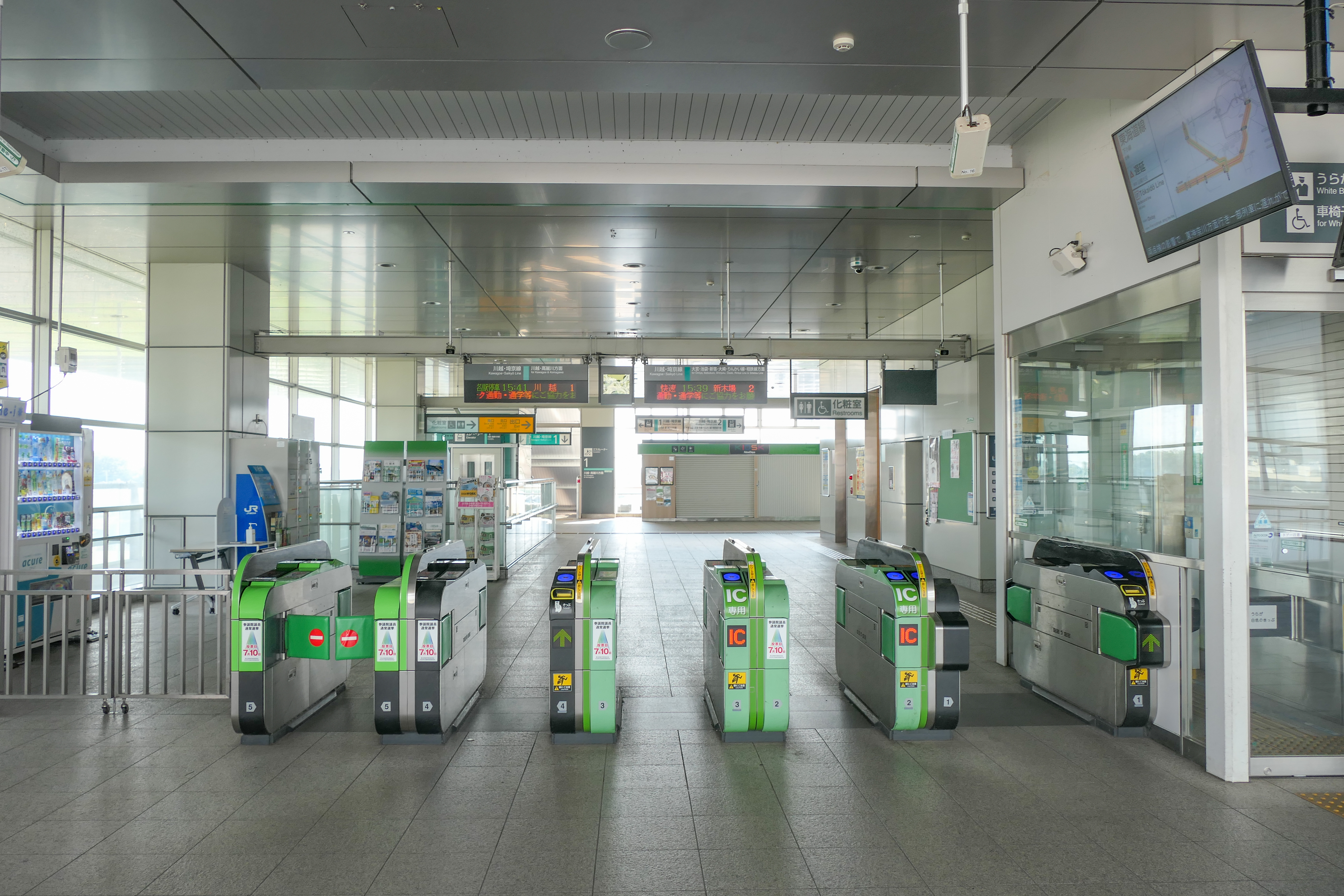
The ticket barriers in June 2022

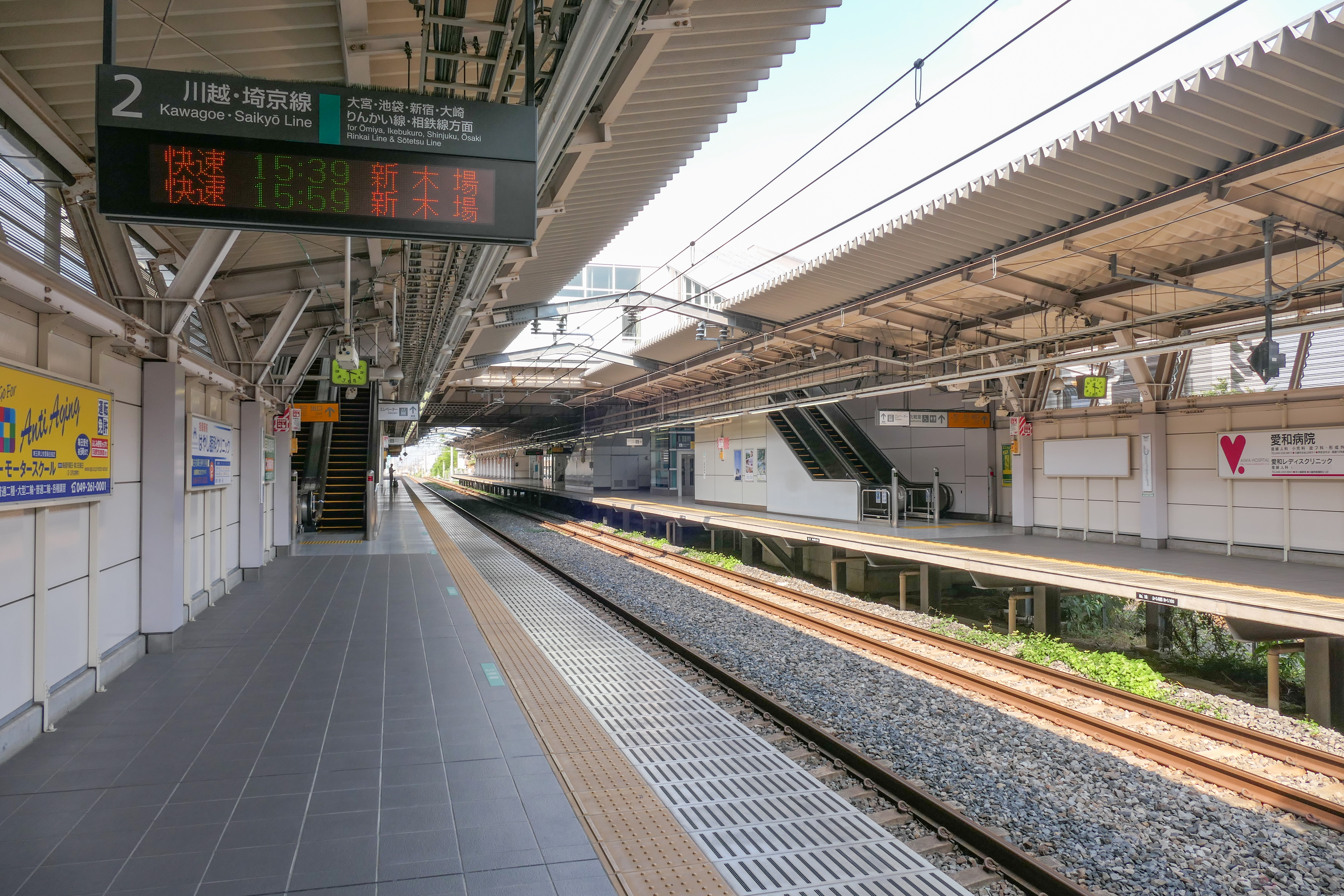
Platforms in June 2022

=== Platforms ===
1	■ Kawagoe Line	for Kawagoe
2	■ Kawagoe Line	for Ōmiya, Ikebukuro, and Shinjuku; Rinkai Line through service to Shin-Kiba

== History ==
The station opened on 14 March 2009.

== Passenger statistics ==
In fiscal 2019, the station was used by an average of 11,158 passengers daily (boarding passengers only). The passenger figures (boarding passengers only) for previous years are as shown below.

Fiscal year	Daily average
2009	4,620
2010	5,533
2011	6,221
2015	8,838

== Surrounding area ==
- Saitama Nishi Ward Office
- Ōmiya Nishi Police Station
- Saitama Nishi Fire Station
- Aoba-en Gardens

=== Schools ===
- Nishi-Ōmiya Junior High School
- Sashiōgi Junior High School
- Miyamae Elementary School
- Sashiōgi Elementary School
- Himawari Special School

== See also ==
- List of railway stations in Japan
