= Nishi-Goryō Station =

Railway station in Asahikawa, Hokkaido, Japan

F31 Nishi-Goryō 西御料
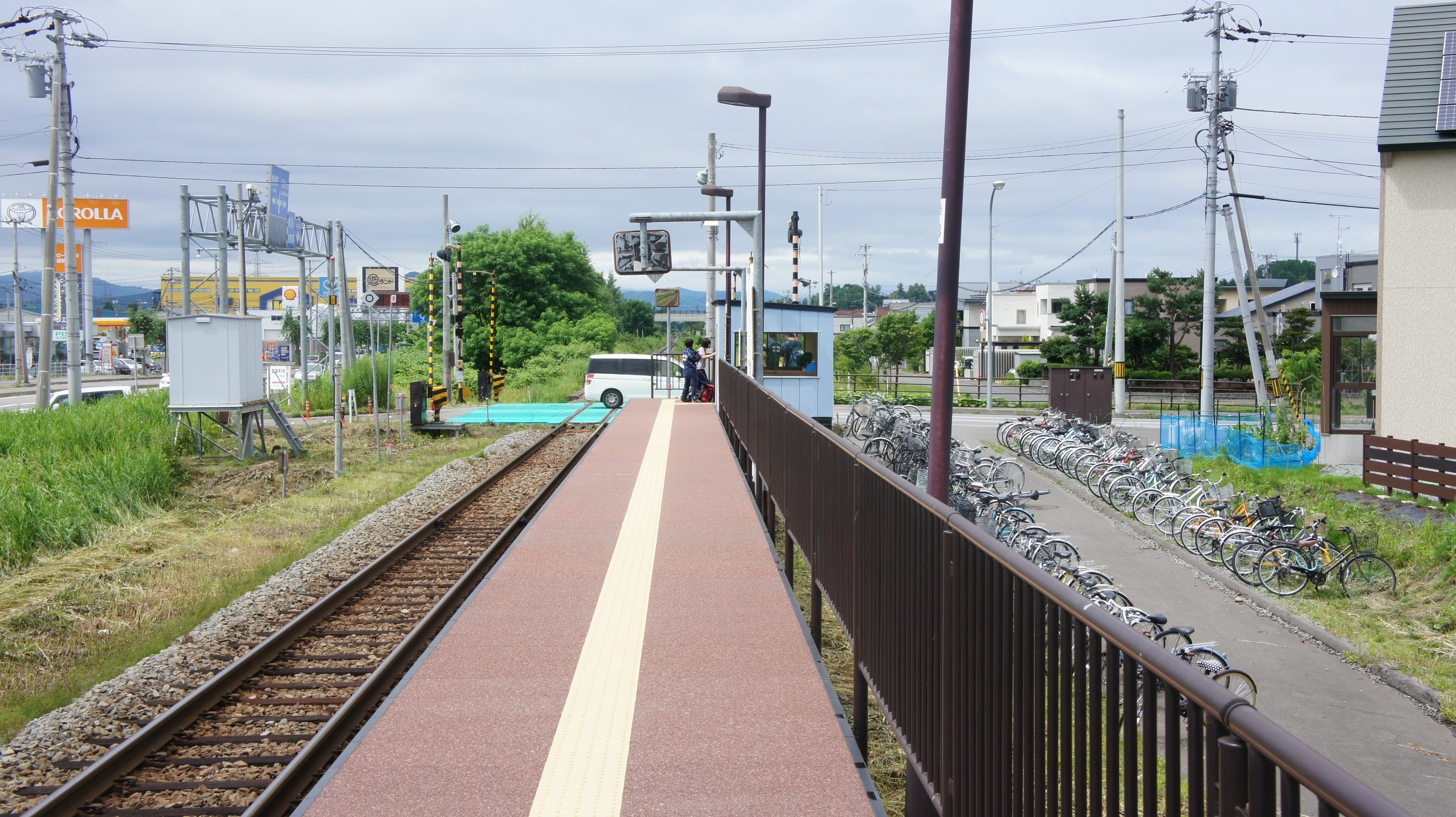
- Nishi-Goryō Station

General information
- Location: Nishi-Goryō 4-jo 3-chome, Asahikawa; Hokkaido Prefecture; Japan
- Coordinates: 43°43′16.41″N 142°22′16.91″E
- System: JR Hokkaido commuter rail station
- Owner: JR Hokkaido
- Operator: JR Hokkaido
- Line: Furano Line
- Distance: 5.2 km (3.2 miles) from Asahikawa
- Platforms: 1 side platform
- Tracks: 1
- Bus stands: yes

Construction
- Structure type: At grade
- Accessible: None

Other information
- Station code: F31
- Website: Official website

History
- Opened: 25 March 1958; 68 years ago

Services
Preceding station	JR Hokkaido	Following station
Midorigaoka F30 towards Asahikawa	Furano Line	Nishi-Mizuho F32 towards Furano
Location
- Location within Hokkaido Location within Japan

Nishi-Goryō Station (西御料駅, Nishi-Goryō-eki) is a train station located in Asahikawa, Hokkaidō, Japan. It is operated by the Hokkaido Railway Company. Only local trains stop. The station is assigned station number F31.

== Lines serviced ==
- Furano Line

== Surrounding Area ==
- Route 237
