= Nishi-Mizuho Station =

Railway station in Asahikawa, Hokkaido, Japan

F32 Nishi-Mizuho 西瑞穂
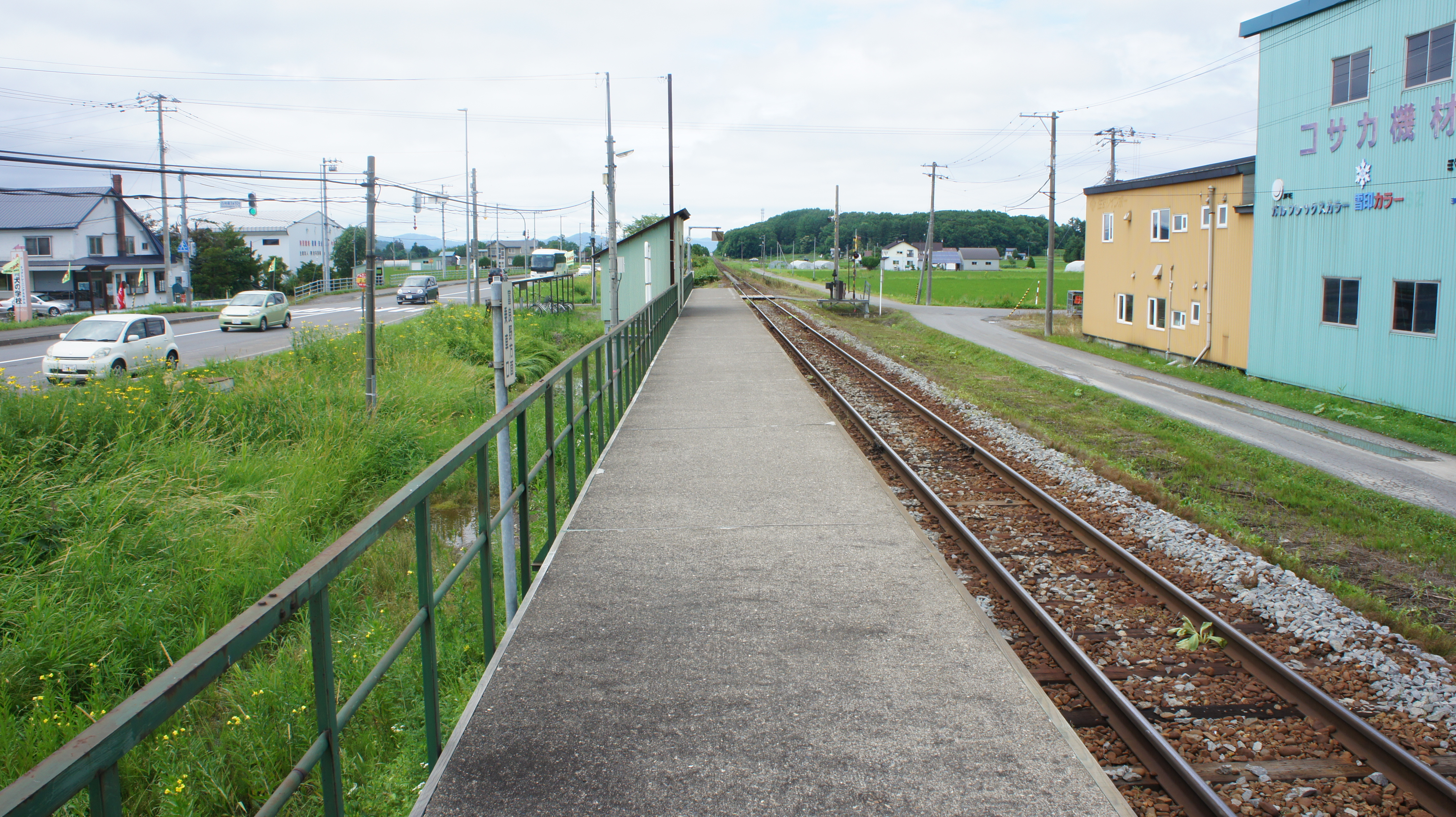
- Nishi-Mizuho Station

General information
- Location: 9, Nishi-Kagura 1-sen, Asahikawa; Hokkaido Prefecture; Japan
- Coordinates: 43°42′9.41″N 142°22′54.66″E
- System: JR Hokkaido commuter rail station
- Owner: JR Hokkaido
- Operator: JR Hokkaido
- Line: Furano Line
- Distance: 7.4 km (4.6 miles) from Asahikawa
- Platforms: 1 side platform
- Tracks: 1
- Bus stands: yes

Construction
- Structure type: At grade
- Accessible: None

Other information
- Station code: F32
- Website: Official website

History
- Opened: 25 March 1958; 68 years ago

Services
Preceding station	JR Hokkaido	Following station
Nishi-Goryō F31 towards Asahikawa	Furano Line	Nishi-Kagura F33 towards Furano
Location
- Location within Hokkaido Location within Japan

Nishi-Mizuho Station (西瑞穂駅, Nishi-Mizuho-eki) is a train station located in Asahikawa, Hokkaidō, Japan. It is operated by the Hokkaido Railway Company. Only local trains stop. The station is assigned station number F32.

== Lines serviced ==
- Furano Line

== Surrounding Area ==
- Route 237
