= Nankōguchi Station =

Metro station in Osaka, Japan

Nankōguchi Station 南港口駅
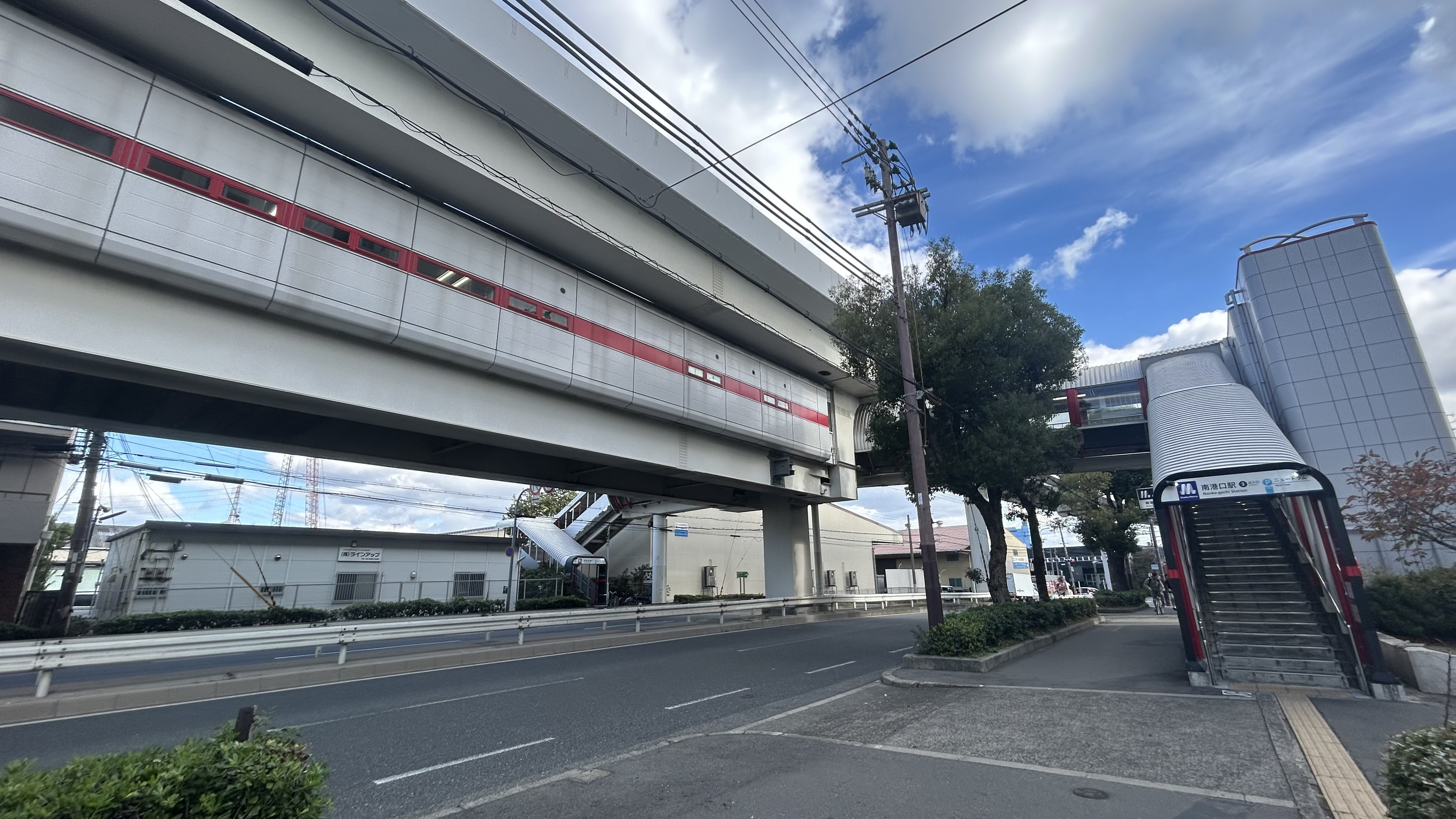
- Nankōguchi Station exterior

General information
- Location: 1 Nankōhigashi, Suminoe, Osaka, Osaka （大阪府大阪市住之江区南港東1丁目） Japan
- Coordinates: 34°36′50″N 135°26′46″E
- System: Osaka Metro
- Operator: Osaka Metro station
- Line: Nankō Port Town Line
- Platforms: 1 island platform
- Tracks: 2

Construction
- Structure type: Elevated

Other information
- Station code: P 16

History
- Opened: 16 March 1981; 45 years ago

Passengers
- FY2013: 4,707 daily

Services
Preceding station	Osaka Metro	Following station
Nankō-higashi P 15 towards Cosmosquare	Nankō Port Town Line	Hirabayashi P 17 towards Suminoekōen
Location
- Location within Osaka Prefecture Location within Japan

Nankōguchi Station (南港口駅, Nankōguchi-eki) is a train station on the Nankō Port Town Line (New Tram) in Suminoe-ku, Osaka, Japan.

== Lines ==
- Nankō Port Town Line (Station Number: P16)

== Layout ==
There is an elevated island platform with two tracks. The station is completely walled in with glass walls.

1	■ Nankō Port Town Line	for Suminoekōen
2	■ Nankō Port Town Line	for Nakafutō and Cosmosquare
