= Nakanoshima Station (Hokkaido) =

Subway station in Sapporo, Japan

Coordinates: 43°2′15.645″N 141°21′38.22″E

N11 Nakanoshima Station 中の島駅
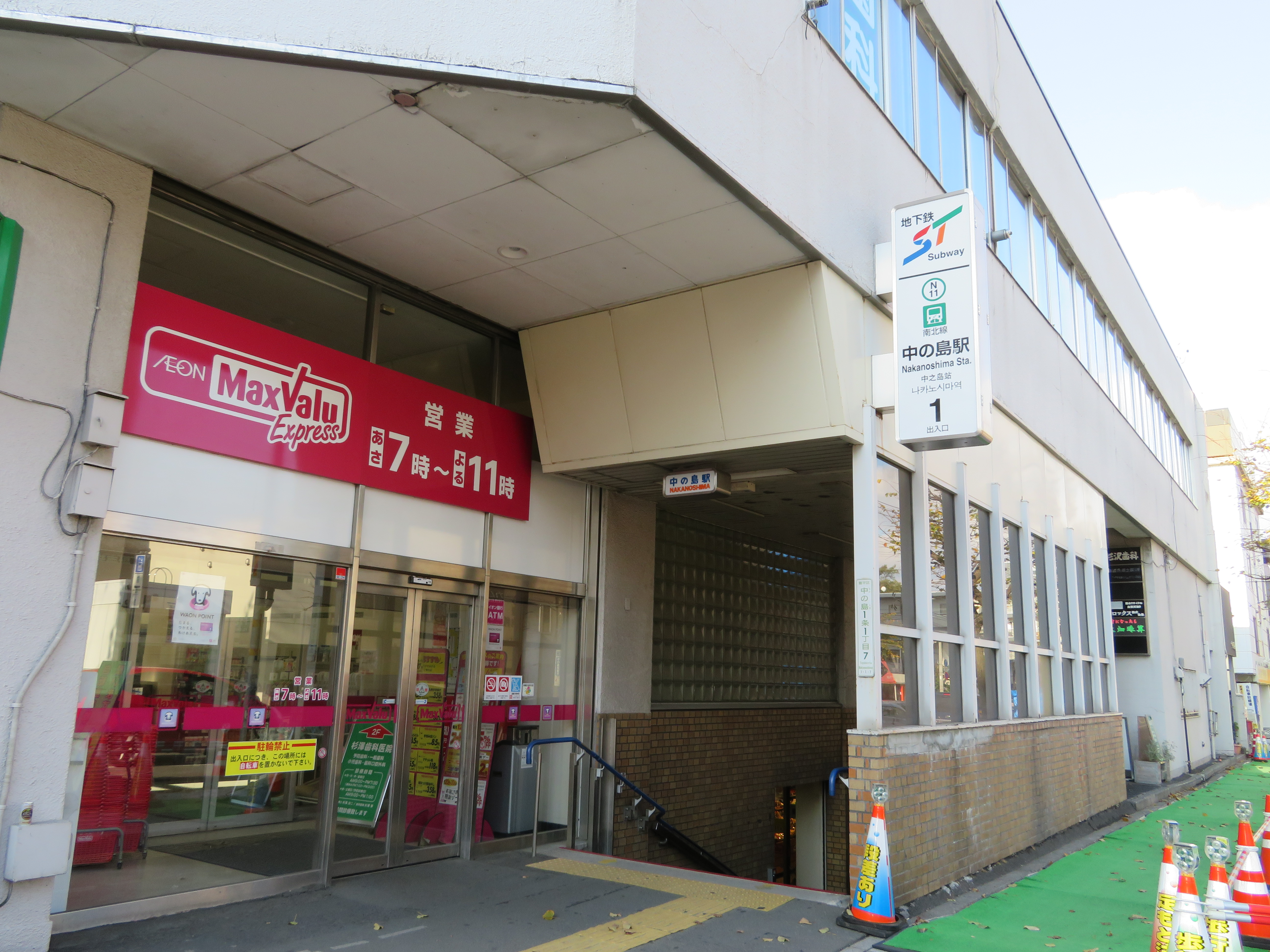
- Station exit

General information
- Location: Toyohira, Sapporo, Hokkaido; Japan
- System: Sapporo Municipal Subway station
- Operator: Sapporo City Transportation Bureau
- Line: Namboku Line

Construction
- Accessible: Yes

Other information
- Station code: N11

History
- Opened: 16 December 1971; 54 years ago

Services
Preceding station	Sapporo Municipal Subway	Following station
Horohira-Bashi N10 towards Asabu	Namboku Line	Hiragishi N12 towards Makomanai
Location
- Location within Hokkaido Location within Japan

Nakanoshima Station (中の島駅) is a Sapporo Municipal Subway station in Toyohira-ku, Sapporo, Hokkaido, Japan. The station number is N11.

== Platforms ==
1	■ Namboku Line	for Makomanai
2	■ Namboku Line	for Asabu

== History ==
The station opened on 16 December 1971 coinciding with the opening of the Namboku Line from Makomanai Station to Kita-Nijuyo-Jo Station.

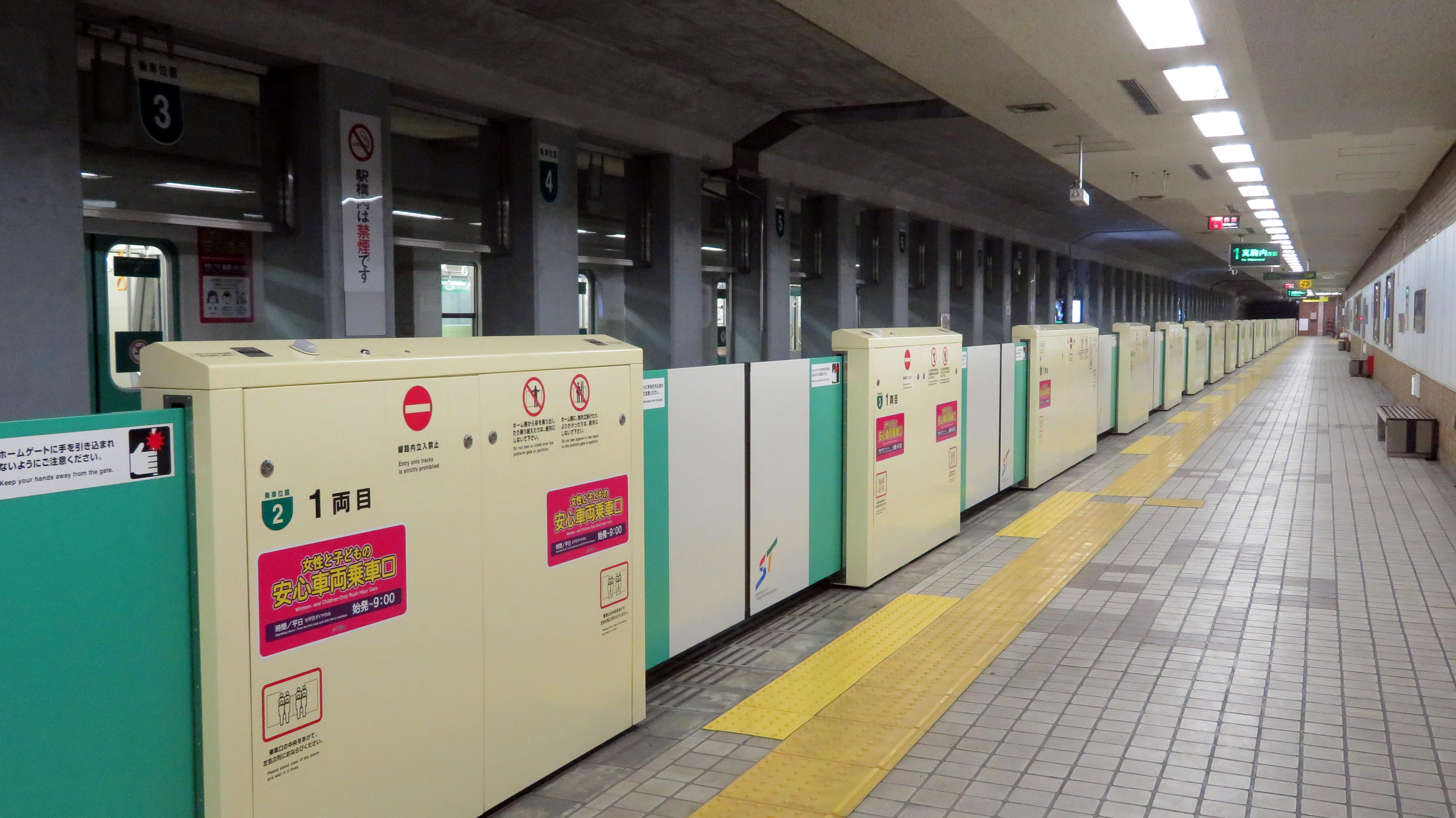
Station platforms

== Surrounding area ==
- Nakanoshima Shrine
- Nakanoshima Post Office
- Nakanoshima Police Station
- Nakanoshima Children's Hall, Sapporo Nakanoshima
- Toyohira Welfare center
- Public Works Research Institute, IAI
- Salmon Fisheries Research Center, IAI
