= Nishi-Kagura Station =

Railway station in Asahikawa, Hokkaido, Japan

Coordinates: 43.6824°N 142.3929°E

F33 Nishi-Kagura Station 西神楽駅
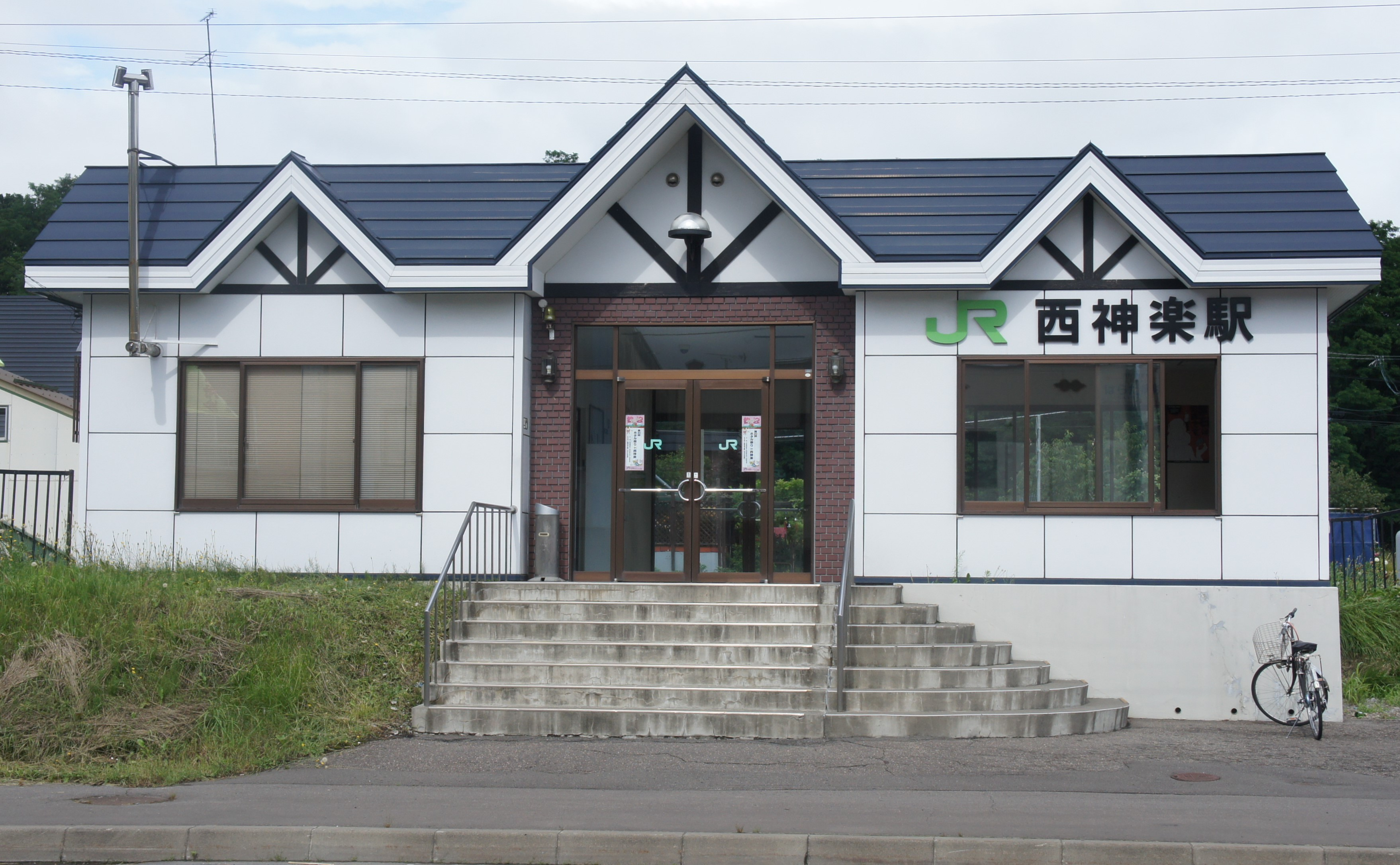
- JR Furano-Line, Nishi-Kagura Station building

General information
- Location: Nishikagura Minami 1-jo 1-chome, Asahikawa; Hokkaido Prefecture; Japan
- System: JR Hokkaido commuter rail station
- Operator: JR Hokkaido
- Line: Furano Line

Other information
- Station code: F33

History
- Opened: 1 September 1899; 126 years ago

Services
Preceding station	JR Hokkaido	Following station
Nishi-Mizuho F32 towards Asahikawa	Furano Line	Nishi-Seiwa F34 towards Furano
Location
- Location within Hokkaido Location within Japan

Nishi-Kagura Station (西神楽駅, Nishi-Kagura-eki) is a train station located in Asahikawa, Hokkaidō, Japan. It is operated by the Hokkaido Railway Company. Only local trains stop. The station is assigned the station number F33.

== Lines serviced ==
- Furano Line
