= Nakafukawa Station =

Railway station in Hiroshima, Japan

Coordinates: 34°28′51.9″N 132°32′2.6″E

Nakafukawa Station 中深川駅
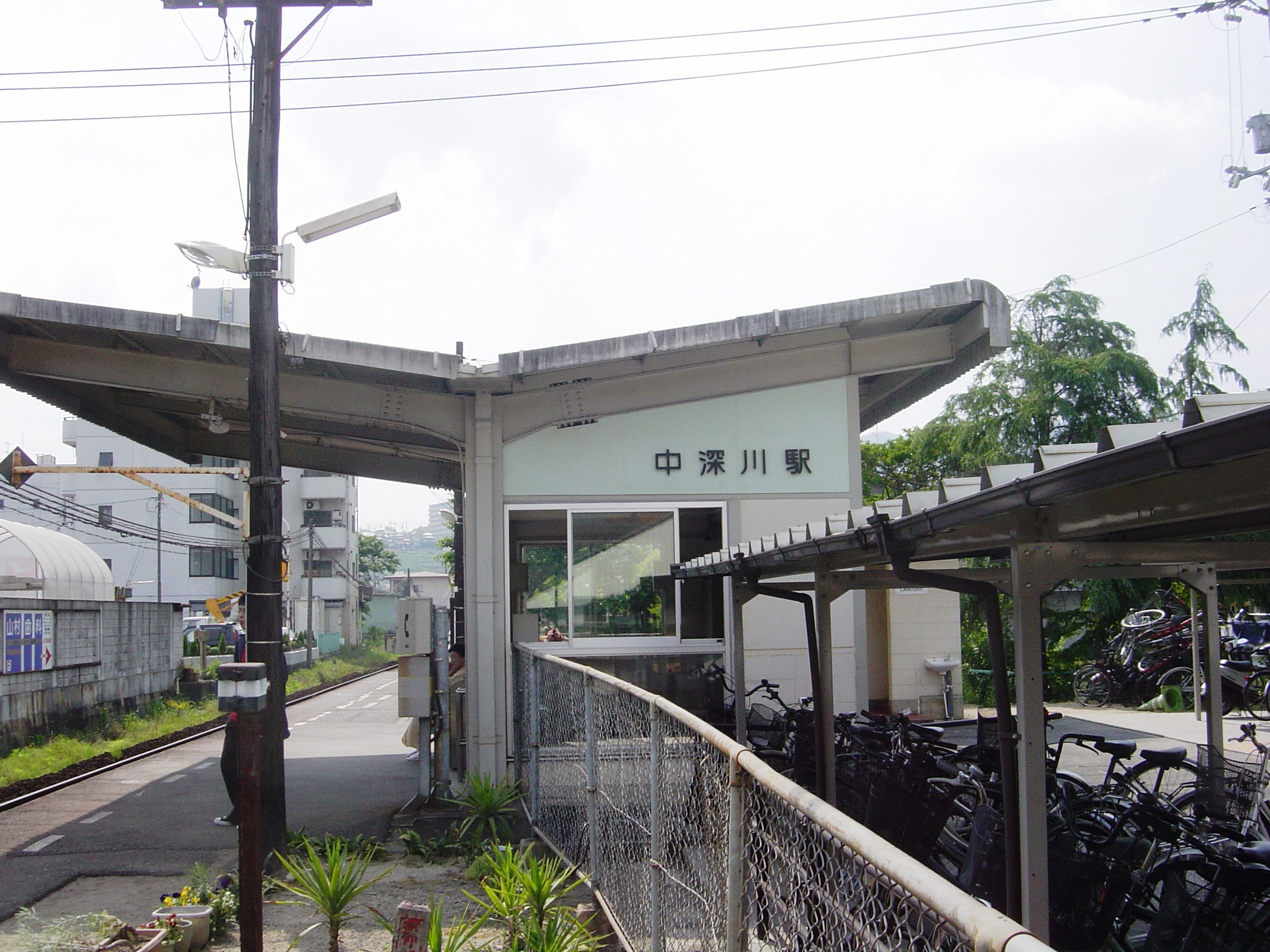
- Nakafukawa Station building (May 15, 2005).

General information
- Location: Asakita, Hiroshima, Hiroshima; Japan
- Operator: JR West
- Line: Geibi Line

History
- Opened: 1923
Location

Nakafukawa Station (中深川駅, Naka-Fukawa-eki) is a JR West Geibi Line station located in 5-chōme, Fukawa, Asakita-ku, Hiroshima, Hiroshima Prefecture, Japan.

== Station building and platforms ==
Nakafukawa Station features one side platform capable of handling one line. Trains bound for Shiwaguchi and Miyoshi are handled on the upper end (上り) of the platform, and trains bound for Hiroshima are handled on the lower end (下り). The station building, as with the building at Kamifukawa Station, is used as convenient meeting place for the residents of the surrounding area. The station is unstaffed but features an automated ticket vending machine.

=== Environs ===
- Hiroshima Nakafukawa Post Office
- Hiroshima Municipal Kōyō Branch Office
- Hiroshima Prefectural Kōyō Higashi High School
- Hiroshima Prefectural Hiroshima Yōgo High School
- Hiroshima Municipal Kamezaki Junior High School
- Hiroshima Municipal Kōyō Junior High School
- Hiroshima Municipal Fukawa Elementary School
- Hiroshima Municipal Kamezaki Elementary School
- Misasa River

=== Highway access ===
- Hiroshima Prefectural Route 37 (Hiroshima-Miyoshi Route)
- Hiroshima Prefectural Route 70 (Hiroshima-Nakashima Route)

== Connecting lines ==
All lines are JR West lines.

Geibi Line
Miyoshi Express

No stop

Commuter Liner

No stop

Miyoshi Liner/Local

Kamifukawa Station — Nakafukawa Station — Shimofukawa Station
