= Nisshin Station (Saitama) =

Railway station in Saitama, Japan

Nisshin Station 日進駅
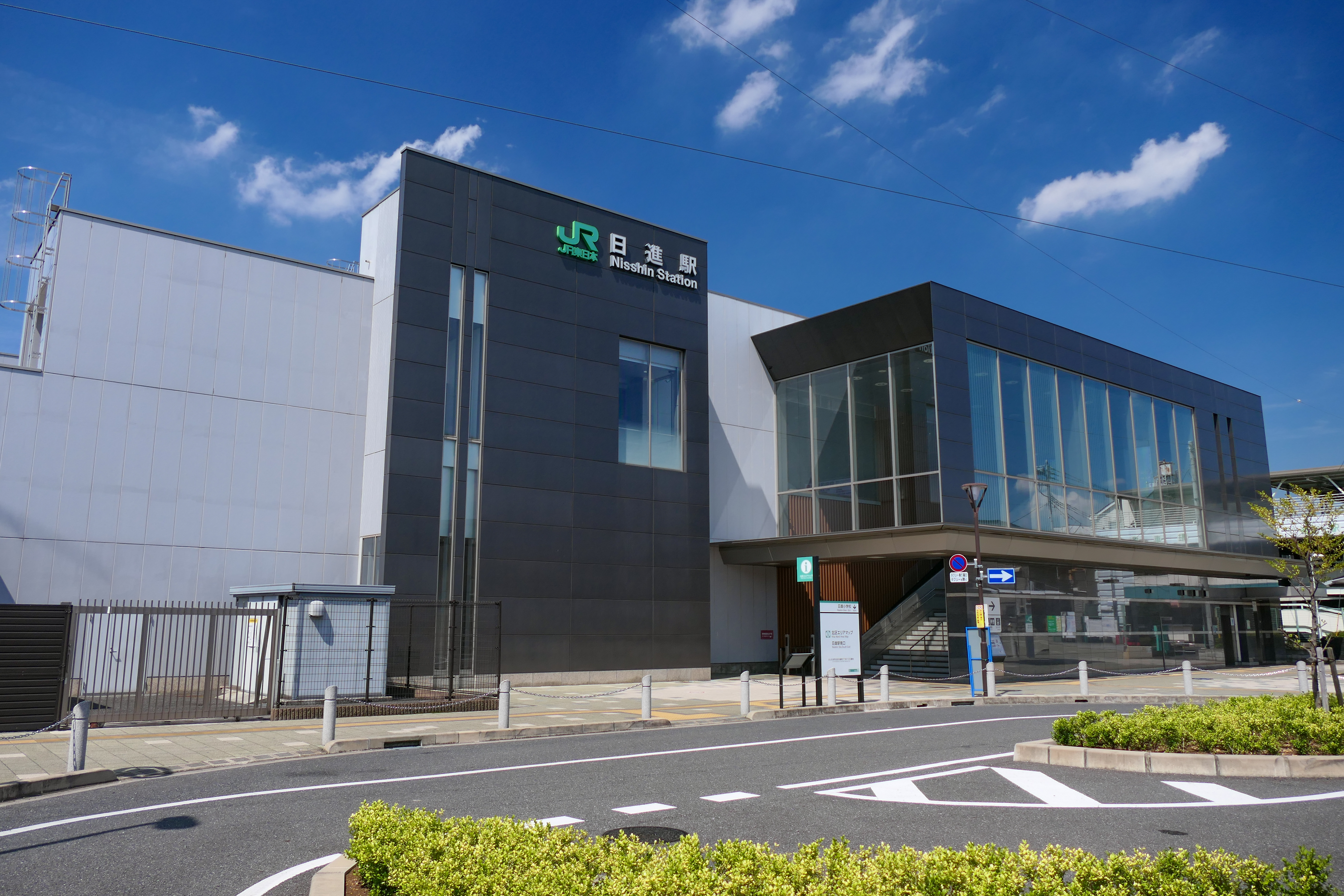
- The south entrance in August 2021

General information
- Location: 2–881 Nisshin-chō, Kita-ku, Saitama-shi, Saitama-ken 331–0823; Japan
- Coordinates: 35°55′53.4″N 139°36′22.47″E
- Operator: JR East
- Line: ■ Kawagoe Line
- Distance: 3.7 km from Ōmiya
- Platforms: 2 side platforms
- Tracks: 2
- Connections: Bus stop

Other information
- Website: Official website

History
- Opened: 22 July 1940; 86 years ago
- Rebuilt: 2010–2011; 15 years ago
- Electrified: 30 September 1985; 40 years ago

Passengers
- FY2019: 13,770 (daily, boarding only)

Services
Preceding station	JR East	Following station
Nishi-Ōmiya towards Kawagoe	Kawagoe Line Commuter Rapid Rapid Local	Ōmiya JA26 Terminus
Location
- Location within Saitama Prefecture Location within Japan

Nisshin Station (日進駅, Nisshin-eki) is a passenger railway station on the Kawagoe Line located in Kita-ku, Saitama, Saitama Prefecture, Japan, operated by East Japan Railway Company (JR East).

== Lines ==
Nisshin Station is served by the Kawagoe Line between Kawagoe and Ōmiya, and is located 3.7 km from Ōmiya Station. Most trains continue beyond Ōmiya on the Saikyo Line to Shinjuku and Shin-Kiba. Services operate every 20 minutes during the daytime.

== Station layout ==
The station has two side platforms serving two tracks, with an elevated station building. The station is staffed.

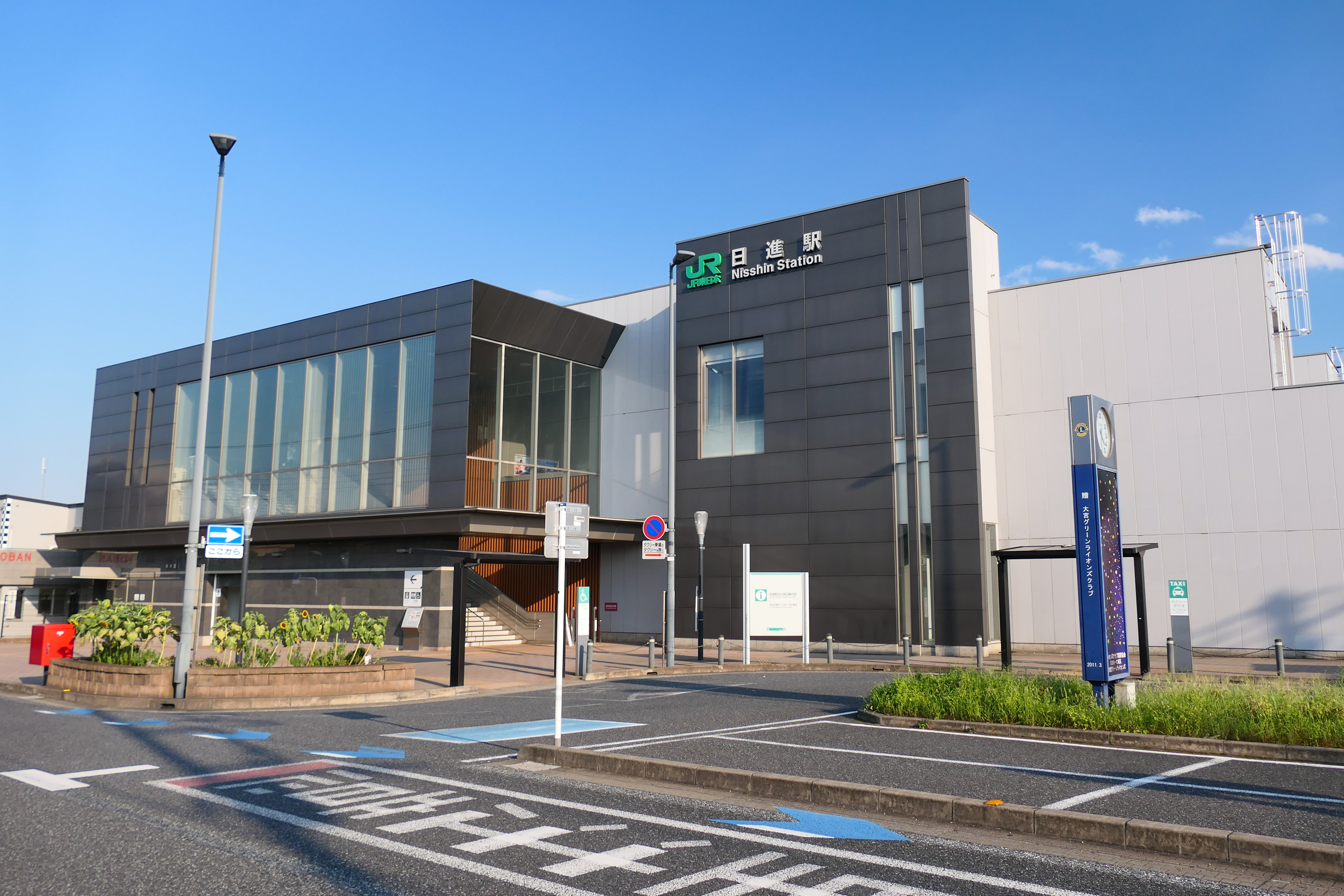
The north side of the station in August 2021

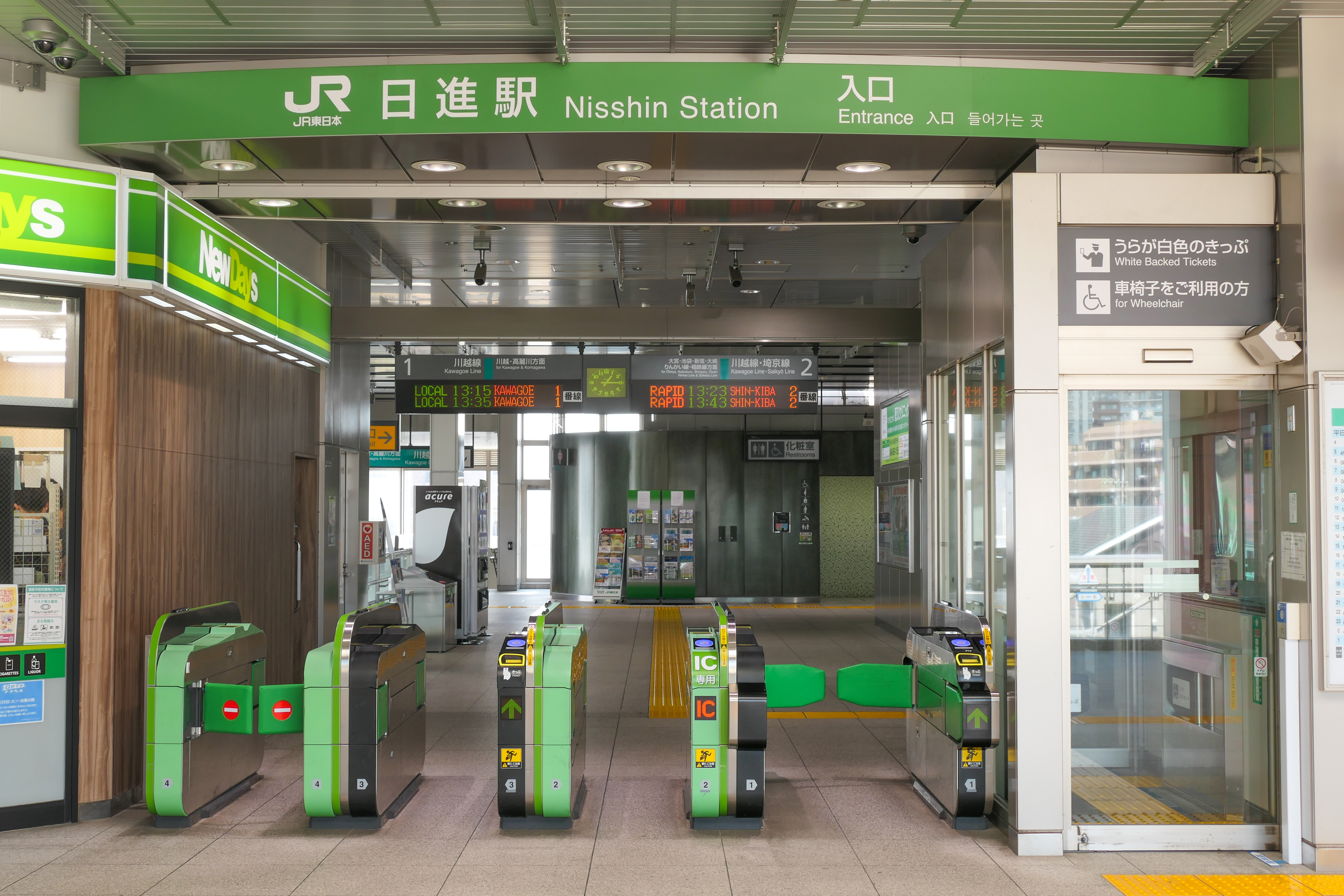
Ticket barriers in August 2021

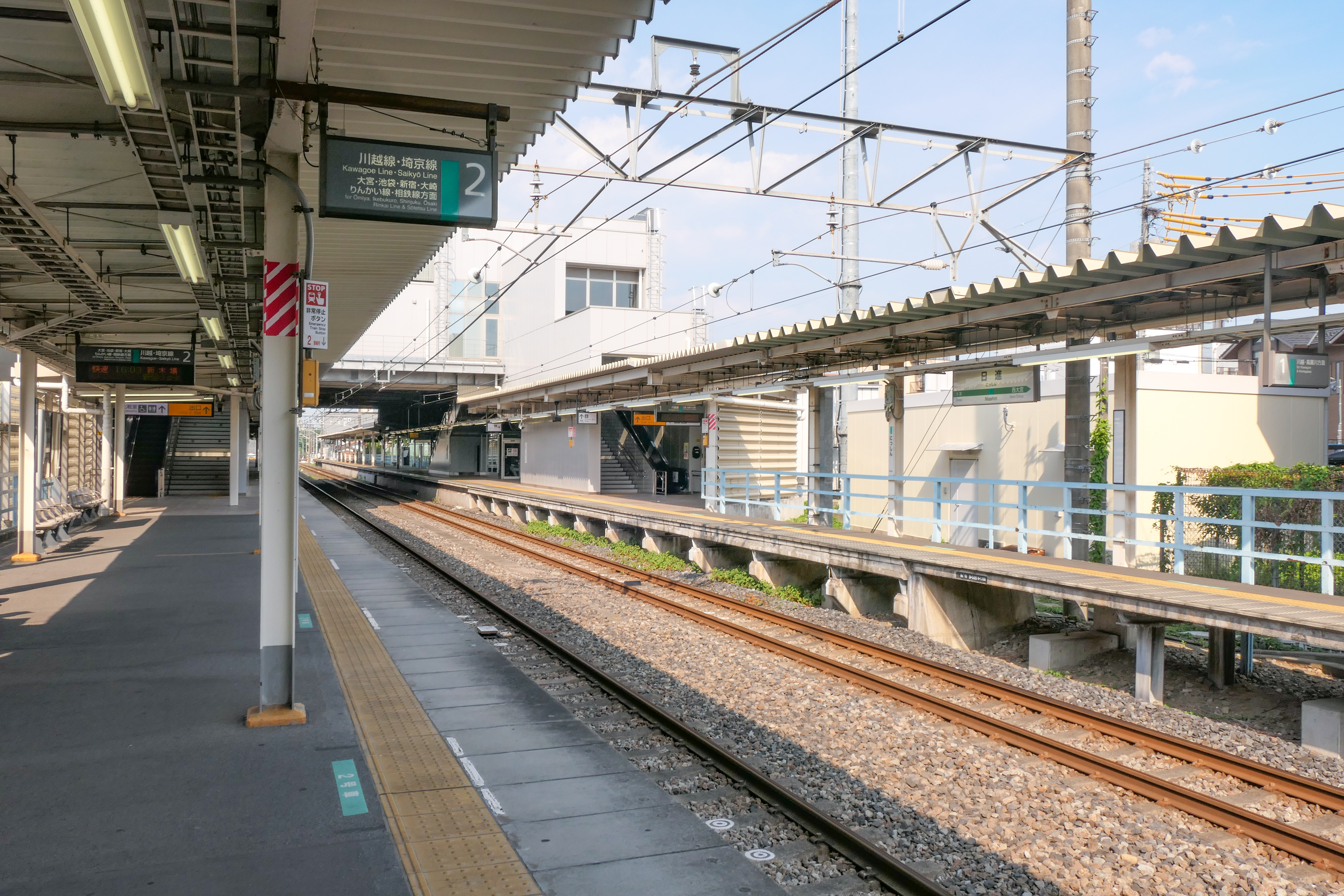
The platforms in June 2022

=== Platforms ===
1	■ Kawagoe Line	for Sashiōgi and Kawagoe
2	■ Kawagoe Line	for Ōmiya, Ikebukuro, and Shinjuku, Rinkai Line through service to Shin-Kiba

== History ==
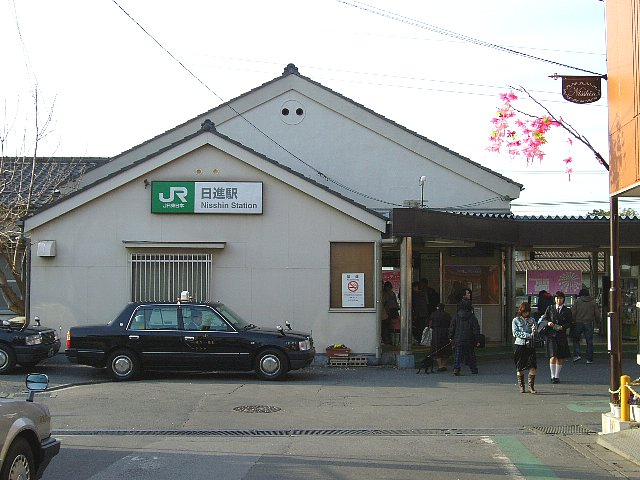
The station entrance in April 2006 before rebuilding

The station opened on 22 July 1940. The line was electrified on 30 September 1985, from which date through-running began to and from the Saikyo Line. With the privatization of Japanese National Railways (JNR) on 1 April 1987, the station came under the control of JR East.

From March 2010, rebuilding work started, adding new entrances on both north and south sides of the station, with escalators leading up to a section in front of the gate, bridging over the two train platforms. New elevators were added, as well as new toilets, one inside and one outside, next to the north entrance. The old entrance was closed, and the new station building was completed during 2011.

== Passenger statistics ==
In fiscal 2019, the station was used by an average of 13,770 passengers daily (boarding passengers only). The passenger figures for previous years are as shown below.

Fiscal year	Daily average
2000	11,647
2005	11,632
2010	12,290
2015	13,382

== Surrounding area ==
- JR East Research & Development Centre
- Calsonic Kansei Headquarters and Research & Development Centre
- Miyahara Station on the Takasaki Line (15 minutes' walk)

== See also ==
- List of railway stations in Japan
