= Okayama Freight Terminal =

Freight station in Okayama, Japan

Coordinates: 34.6569°N 133.898°E

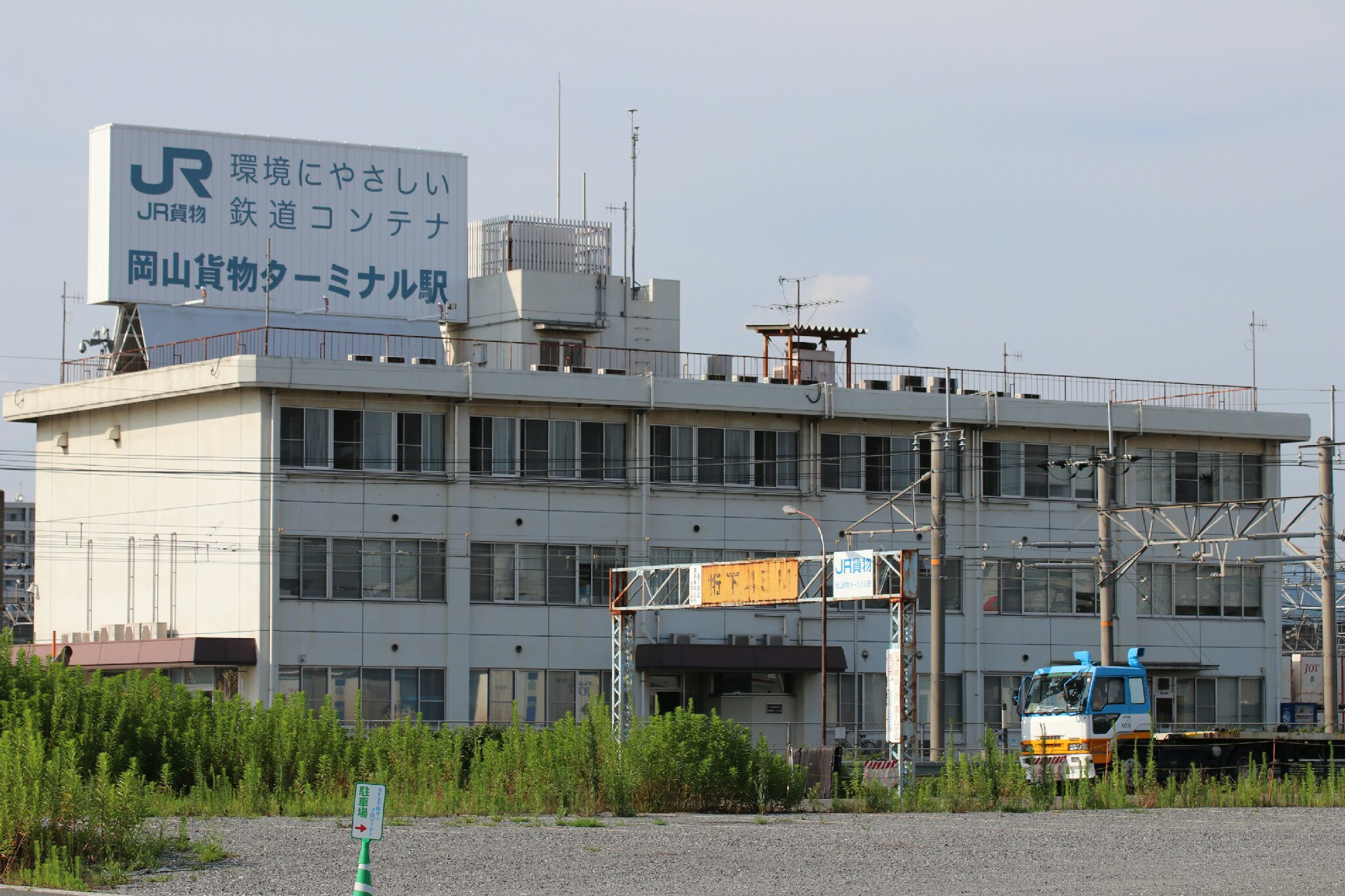
Okayama Freight Terminal pictured in 2016.

Okayama Freight Terminal (Japanese: 岡山貨物ターミナル駅, Hepburn: Okayama-kamotsu-tāminaru-eki) is a freight terminal operated by Japan Freight Railway Company (JR Freight) located in Okayama, Okayama Prefecture, Japan. It was called Nishi-Okayama Station (西岡山駅, Nishi-Okayama-eki) until March 26, 2016.
