= Nakatsuno Station =

Railway station in Fukui, Fukui Prefecture, Japan

Nakatsuno Station 中角駅
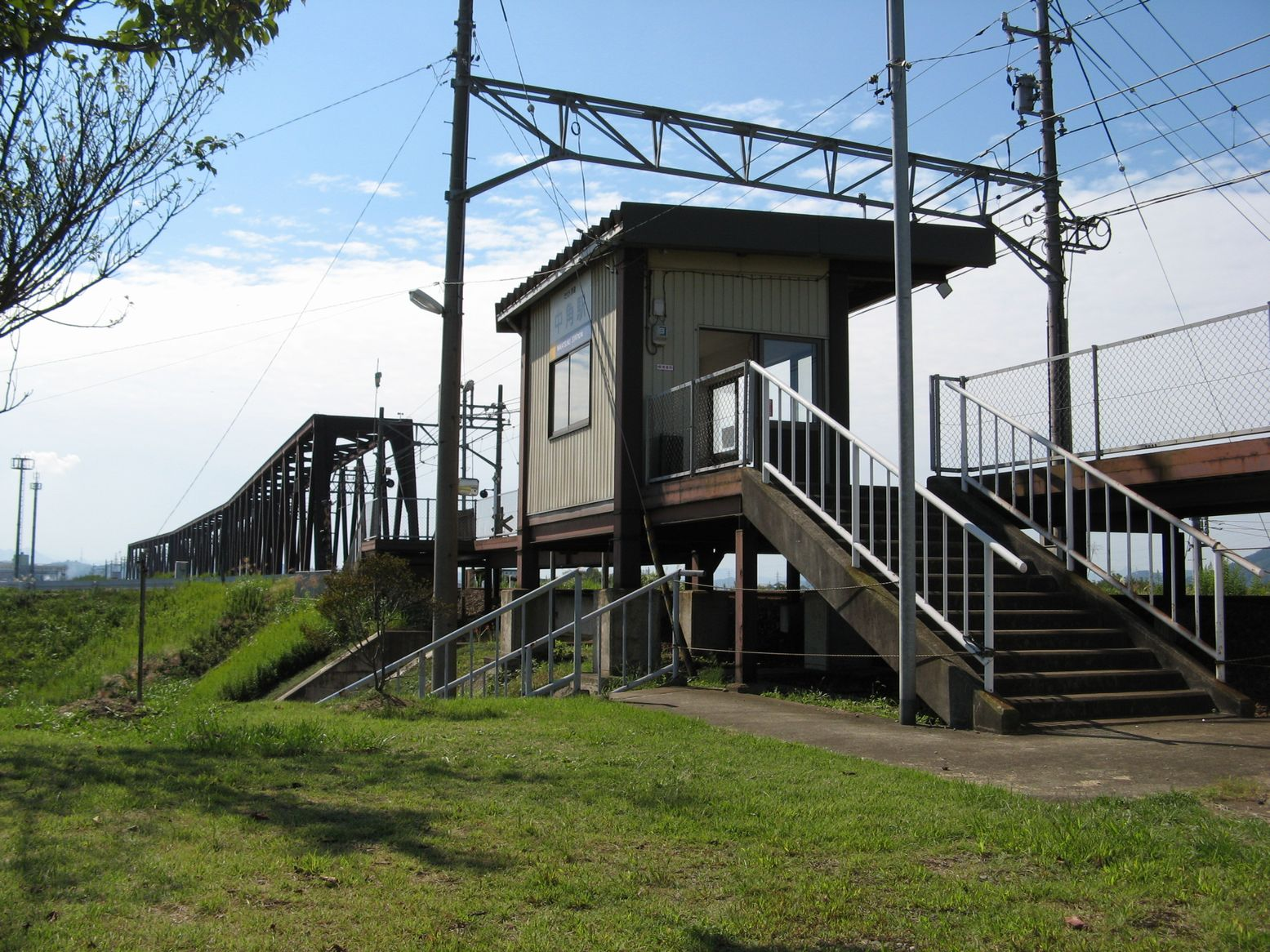
- Nakatsuno Station in October 2007

General information
- Location: 49 Nakatsuno-chō, Fukui-shi, Fukui-ken 910-0103; Japan
- Coordinates: 36°06′05″N 136°12′16″E
- Operator: Echizen Railway
- Line: ■ Mikuni Awara Line
- Distance: 5.9 km from Fukuiguchi
- Platforms: 1 side platform
- Tracks: 1

Other information
- Status: Unstaffed
- Station code: E31
- Website: Official website

History
- Opened: December 20, 1928
Location
- Location within Fukui Prefecture Location within Japan

Nakatsuno Station (中角駅, Nakatsuno-eki) is an Echizen Railway Mikuni Awara Line railway station located in the city of Fukui, Fukui Prefecture, Japan.

== Lines ==
Nakatsuno Station is served by the Mikuni Awara Line, and is located 5.9 kilometers from the terminus of the line at Fukuiguchi.

== Station layout ==
The station consists of one side platform serving a single bi-directional track. The station is unattended.

== Adjacent stations ==
«	Service	»
Mikuni Awara Line
Express: Does not stop at this station
Nittazuka	Local	Washizuka-Haribara

== History ==
Nakatsuno Station was opened on December 30, 1928.

On September 1, 1942 the Keifuku Electric Railway merged with Mikuni Awara Electric Railway. Operations were halted from June 25, 2001. The station reopened on August 10, 2003 as an Echizen Railway station.

== Surrounding area ==
- The station is located on the northern embankment of the Kuzuryū River; further north of it are rice fields.
- Approximately one kilometer east are Jin-ai Women's College and Amaike Riverside Park; however, JR West Morita Station is closer to both.

== See also ==
- List of railway stations in Japan
