= Nishi-Seiwa Station =

Railway station in Asahikawa, Hokkaido, Japan

Coordinates: 43.6688°N 142.4152°E

F34 Nishi-Seiwa Station 西聖和駅
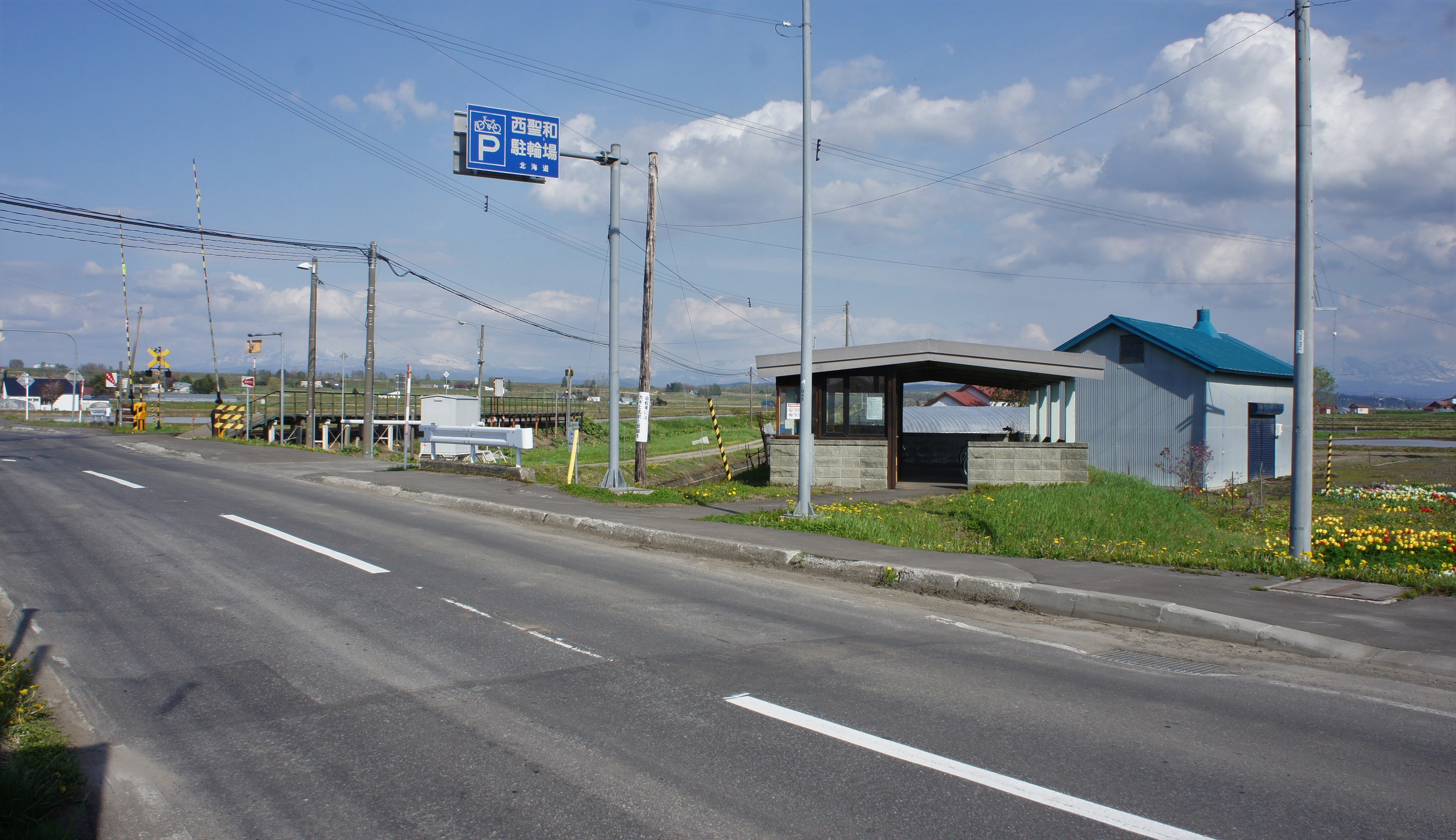
- Nishi-Seiwa Station Overall

General information
- Location: 2 Chome Nishikagura Minami 1 Jo, Asahikawa; Hokkaido Prefecture 071-0171; Japan
- System: JR Hokkaido commuter rail station
- Operator: JR Hokkaido
- Line: Furano Line
- Platforms: 1 side platform
- Tracks: 1

Construction
- Structure type: At grade

Other information
- Station code: F34

History
- Opened: 25 March 1958; 68 years ago

Services
| Preceding station | JR Hokkaido | Following station |
|---|---|---|
| Nishi-Kagura F33 towards Asahikawa | Furano Line | Chiyogaoka F35 towards Furano |
Location
- Location within Hokkaido Location within Japan

Nishi-Seiwa Station (西聖和駅, Nishi-Seiwa-eki) is a train station located in Asahikawa, Hokkaidō, Japan. It is operated by the Hokkaido Railway Company. Only local trains stop. The station is assigned the station number F34.

== Lines serviced ==
- Furano Line
