= Nikkawa Station =

Railway station in Kiryū, Gunma Prefecture, Japan

Nikkawa Station 新川駅
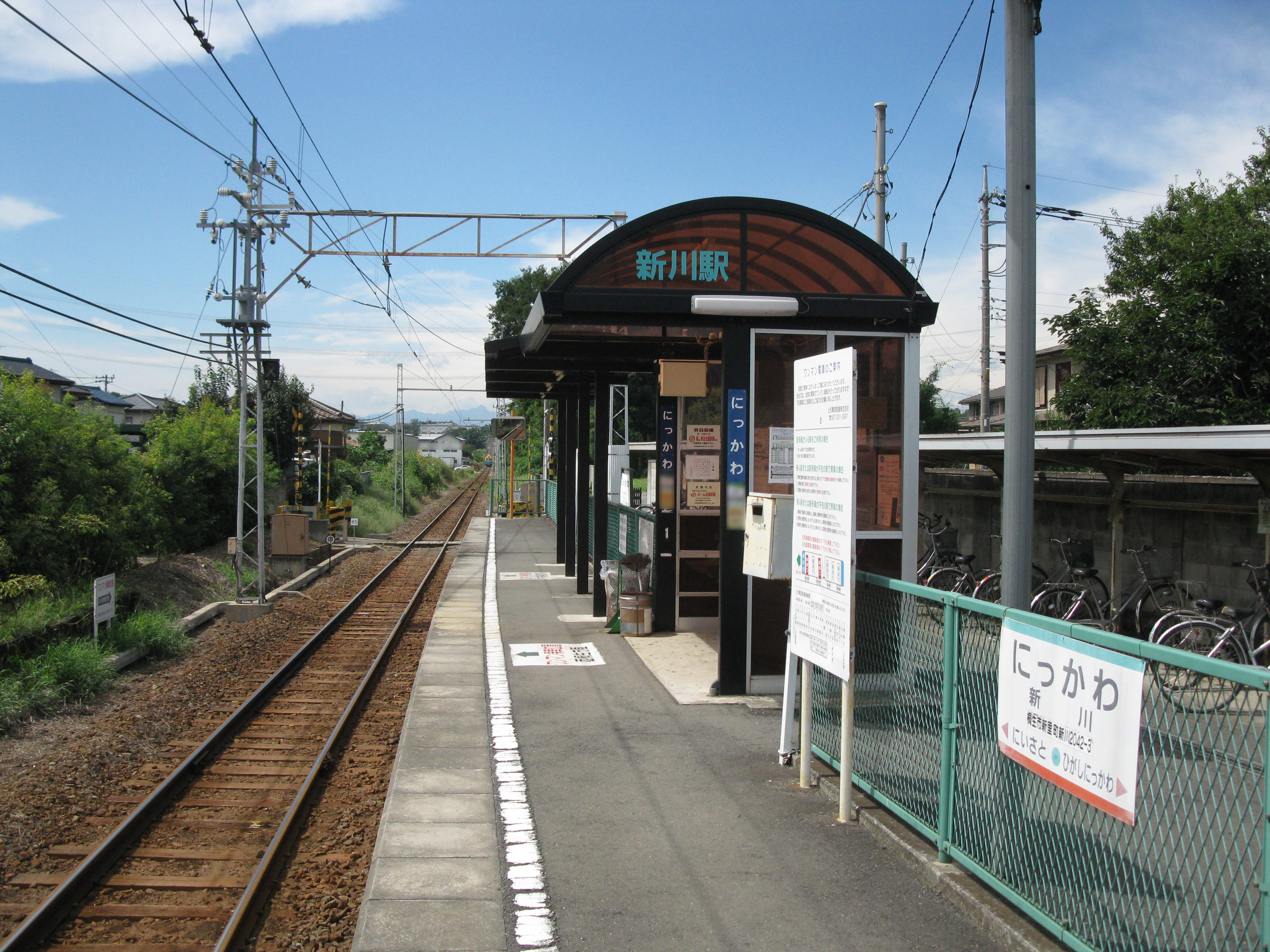
- Nikkawa Station in September 2010

General information
- Location: Niisatocho Nikkawa 2042-3, Kiryū-shi, Gunma-ken 376-0121; Japan
- Coordinates: 36°25′06″N 139°15′28″E
- Operator: Jōmō Electric Railway Company
- Line: ■ Jōmō Line
- Distance: 27.7 km from Chūō-Maebashi
- Platforms: 1 side platform
- Tracks: 1

Other information
- Status: Unstaffed
- Website: Official website

History
- Opened: November 10, 1928

Passengers
- FY2019: 283

Services
| Preceding station | Jōmō Electric Railway | Following station |
|---|---|---|
| Niisato towards Chūō-Maebashi | Jōmō Line | Higashi-Nikkawa towards Nishi-Kiryū |
Location
- Location within Gunma Prefecture Location within Japan

Nikkawa Station (新川駅, Nikkawa-eki) is a passenger railway station in the city of Kiryū, Gunma, Japan, operated by the private railway operator Jōmō Electric Railway Company.

== Lines ==
Nikkawa Station is a station on the Jōmō Line, and is located 17.7 kilometers from the terminus of the line at Chūō-Maebashi .

== Station layout ==
The station consists of one side platform serving traffic in both directions. There is no station building, but only an open-sided weather shelter next to the platform. The station is unattended.

== History ==
Nikkawa Station was opened on November 10, 1928.

== Passenger statistics ==
In fiscal 2019, the station was used by an average of 283 passengers daily (boarding passengers only).

== Surrounding area ==
- Gunma Insect World

== See also ==
- List of railway stations in Japan
