= Lavender Farm Station =

Railway station in Nakafurano, Hokkaido, Japan

F41 Lavender Farm ラベンダー畑駅
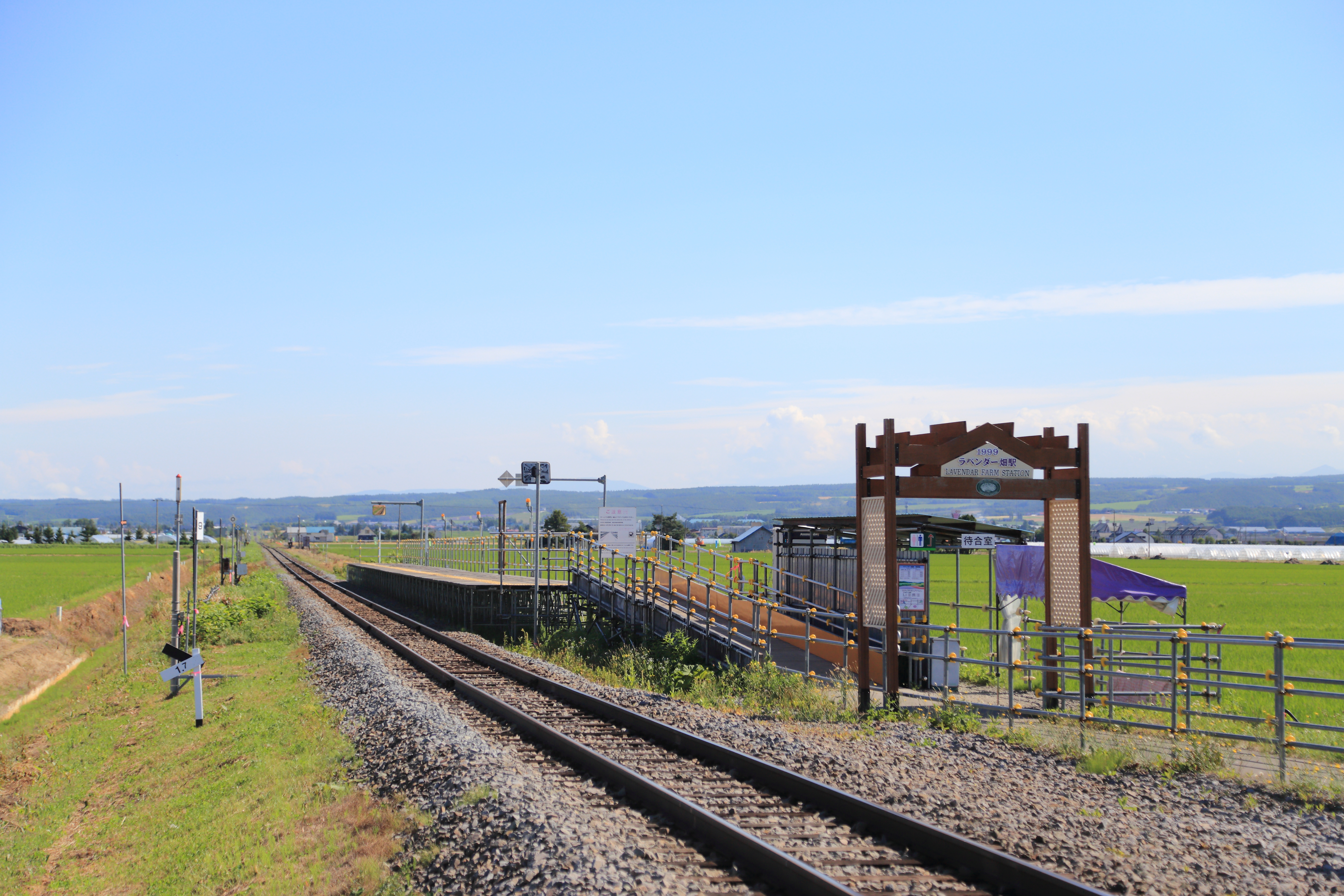
- Entrance to the station

General information
- Location: Kisen-kita 15, Nakafurano; Hokkaido; Japan
- Coordinates: 43°25′0.82″N 142°25′50.39″E
- System: JR Hokkaido commuter rail station
- Owner: JR Hokkaido
- Operator: JR Hokkaido
- Line: Furano Line
- Distance: 45.8 km (28.5 miles) from Asahikawa
- Platforms: 1 side platform
- Tracks: 1

Construction
- Structure type: At grade
- Accessible: None

Other information
- Station code: F41
- Website: Official website

History
- Opened: 11 June 1999; 27 years ago

Services
Preceding station	JR Hokkaido	Following station
Nishinaka F40 towards Asahikawa	Furano Line	Naka-Furano F42 towards Furano
Location
- Location within Hokkaido Location within Japan

Lavender Farm Station (ラベンダー畑駅, Rabendābatake-eki) is a train station located in Nakafurano, Hokkaido, Japan, operated by the Hokkaido Railway Company. It is the only train station in Japan beginning with the letter "L".

The station opens only on selected dates of the year, and only selected trains stop at this station. One of them is the Norokko Train (Furano~Asahikawa Limited Express Service) which always makes a stop there.

== Lines serviced ==
- Furano Line

== Surrounding Area ==
- Route 237
- Farm Tomita
