= Mount Biei =

Volcano on the island of Hokkaido, Japan

- Biei-dake
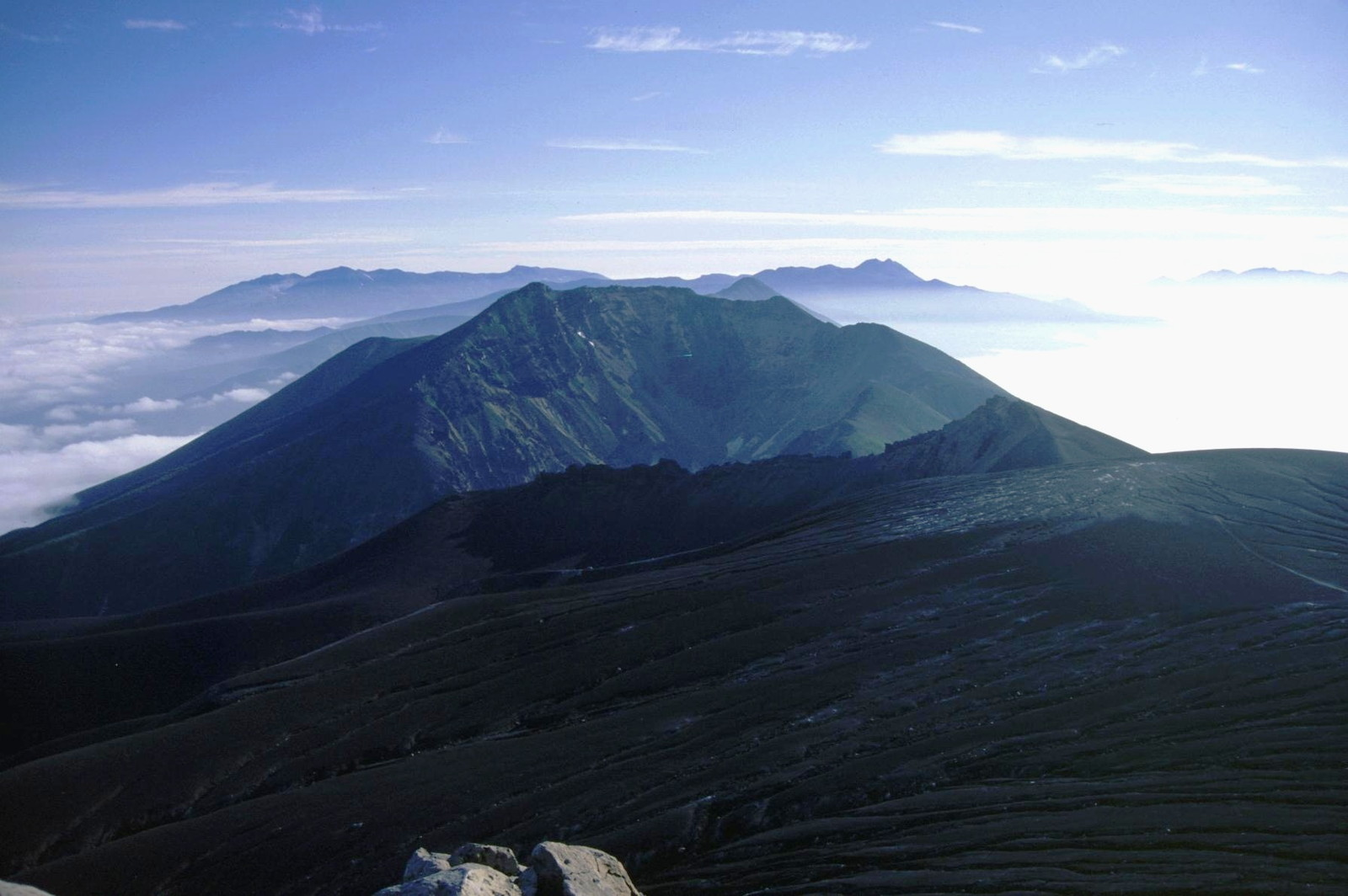
- Mount Biei from Mount Tokachi

Highest point
- Elevation: 2,052.3 m (6,733 ft)
- Listing: Mountains and hills of Japan
- Coordinates: 43°26′24″N 142°42′23″E

Naming
- Native name: 美瑛岳 (Japanese)

Geography
- Location within Japan Location within Hokkaido
- Country: Japan
- Island: Hokkaido
- Parent range: Tokachi Volcanic Group
- Topo map: Geographical Survey Institute 25000:1 白金温泉(旭川)

Geology
- Rock age: Middle Pleistocene
- Mountain type: Stratovolcano
- Volcanic arc: Kuril arc

Mount Biei (美瑛岳, Biei-dake) is a stratovolcano located in the Tokachi Volcanic Group, Hokkaido, Japan. The mountain sits between the larger Mount Tokachi to the southwest and shorter Biei Fuji to the northeast. It forms part of the border between Shintoku and Biei towns.

== Geology ==
The mountain consists of mostly non-alkaline mafic rock from the middle Pleistocene.

== History ==
On July 16, 2009, a 64-year-old man died of exposure on Mount Biei, while five other members of his party had to be rescued. At the same time on nearby Mount Tomuraushi, eight members of an adventure tour group were also killed by exposure and a lone hiker was found dead one day later.

== See also ==
- List of volcanoes in Japan
