= Mount Oputateshike =

Mountain in Hokkaido, Japan

- オプタテシケ山
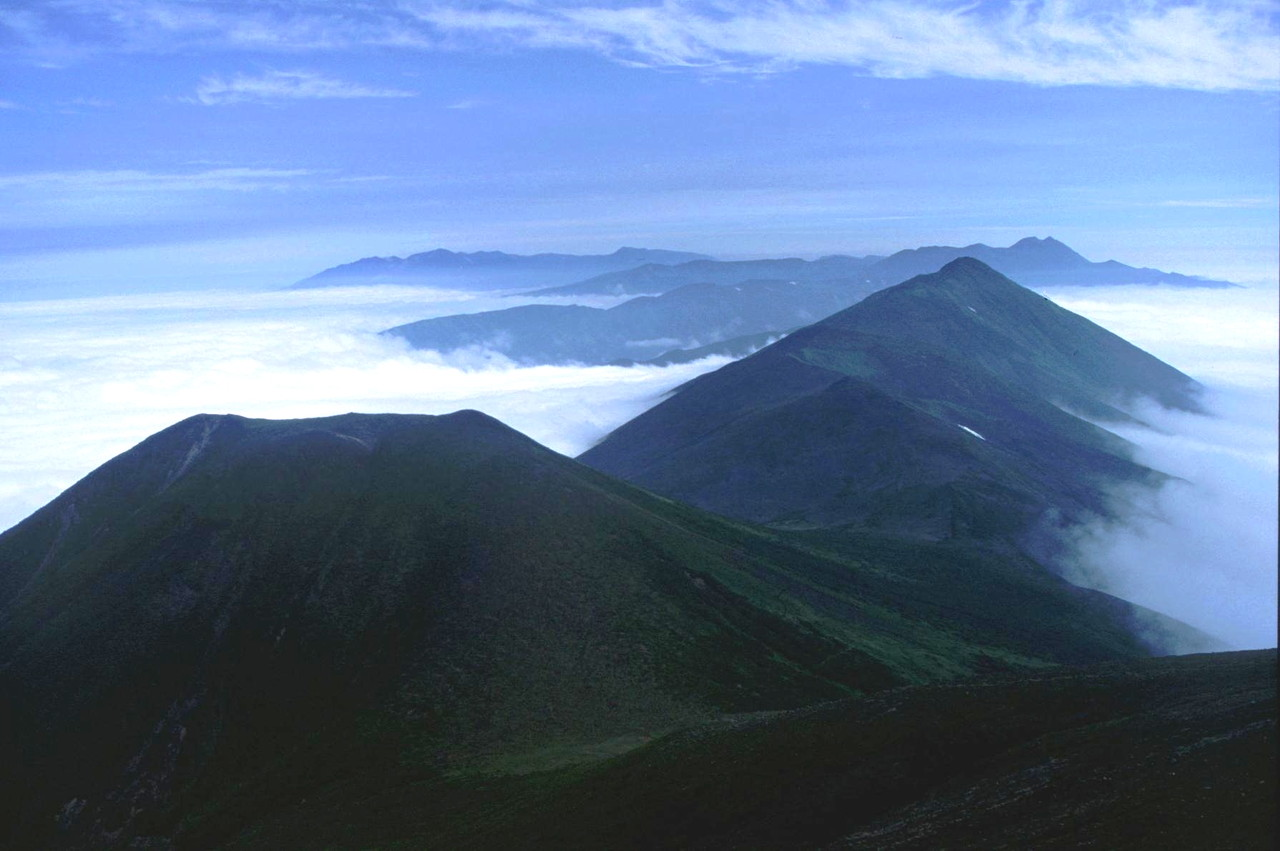
- Biei Fuji (left) and Mount Oputateshike (right) seen from Mount Biei

Highest point
- Elevation: 2,012.5 m (6,603 ft)
- Listing: List of mountains and hills of Japan by height
- Coordinates: 43°28′13″N 142°45′6″E

Geography
- Location within Japan
- Location: Hokkaidō, Japan
- Parent range: Tokachi Volcanic Group
- Topo map(s): Geospatial Information Authority 25000:1 オプタテシケ山; 25000:1 白金温泉; 50000:1 旭川

Geology
- Rock age: Middle Pleistocene
- Mountain type: Volcanic

Mount Oputateshike (オプタテシケ山, Oputateshike-yama) is a mountain of the Tokachi Volcanic Group.

== Geology ==
Mount Oputateshike is made from non-alkaline mafic volcanic rock.

== See also ==
- Tokachi Volcanic Group
- Central Ishikari Mountains
- Daisetsuzan National Park
