= Shikauchi Station =

Railway station in Nakafurano, Hokkaido, Japan

F43 Shikauchi Station 鹿討駅
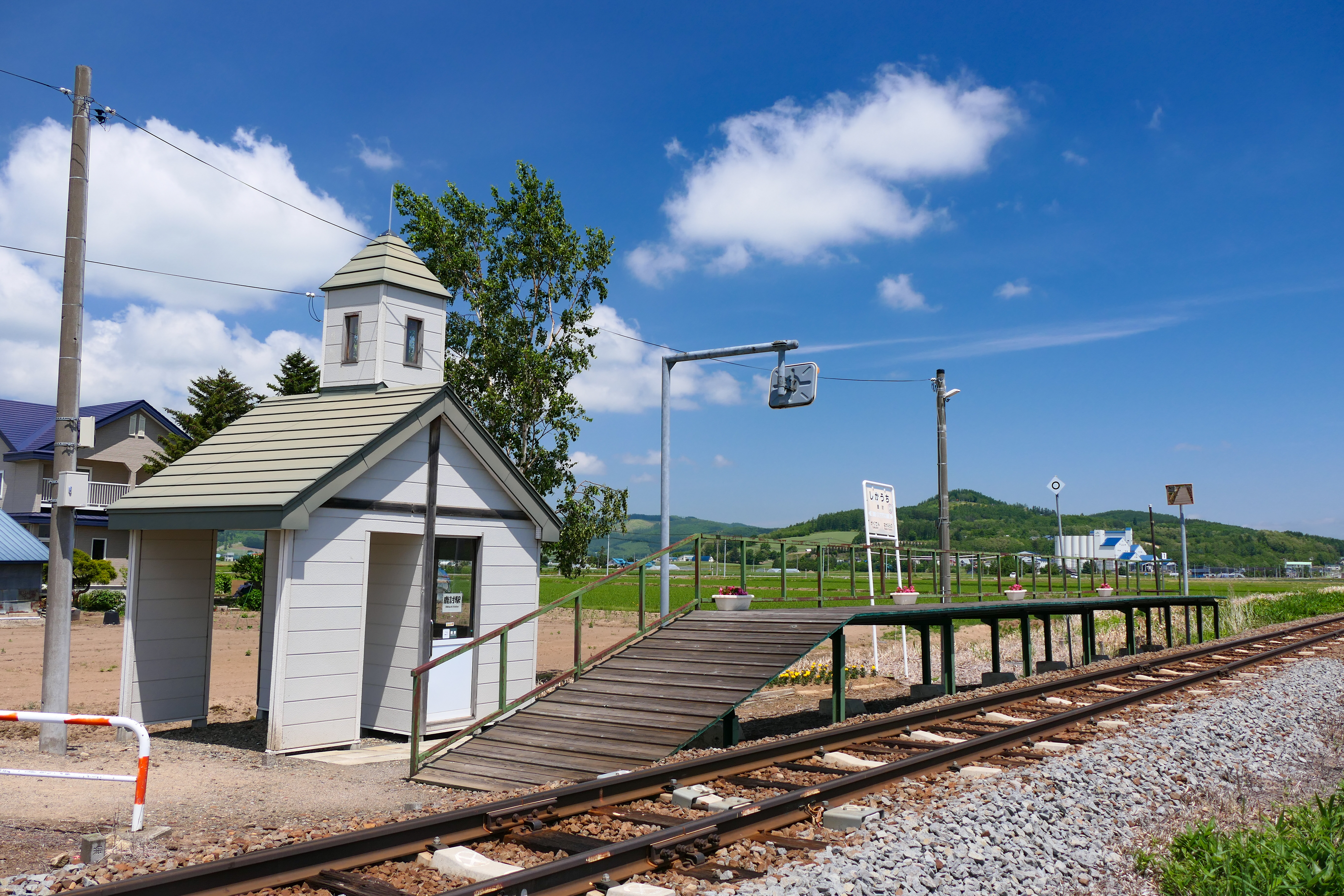
- Shikauchi Station in June, 2022

General information
- Location: Nakafurano, Nakafurano; Hokkaido Prefecture; Japan
- Coordinates: 43°23′15.05″N 142°24′17.47″E
- System: JR Hokkaido commuter rail station
- Owner: JR Hokkaido
- Operator: JR Hokkaido
- Line: Furano Line
- Distance: 49.7 km (30.9 miles) from Asahikawa
- Platforms: 1 side platform
- Tracks: 1

Other information
- Station code: F43
- Website: Official webcite

History
- Opened: 25 March 1958; 68 years ago

Services
| Preceding station | JR Hokkaido | Following station |
|---|---|---|
| Naka-Furano F42 towards Asahikawa | Furano Line | Gakuden F44 towards Furano |
Location
- Location within Hokkaido Location within Japan

Shikauchi Station (鹿討駅, Shikauchi-eki) is a train station located in Nakafurano, Hokkaidō, Japan. It is operated by the Hokkaido Railway Company. Only local trains stop. The station is assigned station number F43.

== Lines serviced ==
- Furano Line

== Surrounding Area ==
- Route 237

== History ==
=== Future plans ===
In June 2023, this station was selected to be among 42 stations on the JR Hokkaido network to be slated for abolition owing to low ridership.
