= Furano =

Furano (富良野) can refer to the following places in Japan:

- Furano, Hokkaidō, a city in Hokkaidō
- Furano Ski Resort, a major alpine ski area near the city of Furano
- Mount Furano, a mountain in the Tokachi Volcanic Group of Hokkaidō
