= Naka-Furano Station =

Railway station in Nakafurano, Hokkaido, Japan

F42 Naka-Furano Station 中富良野駅
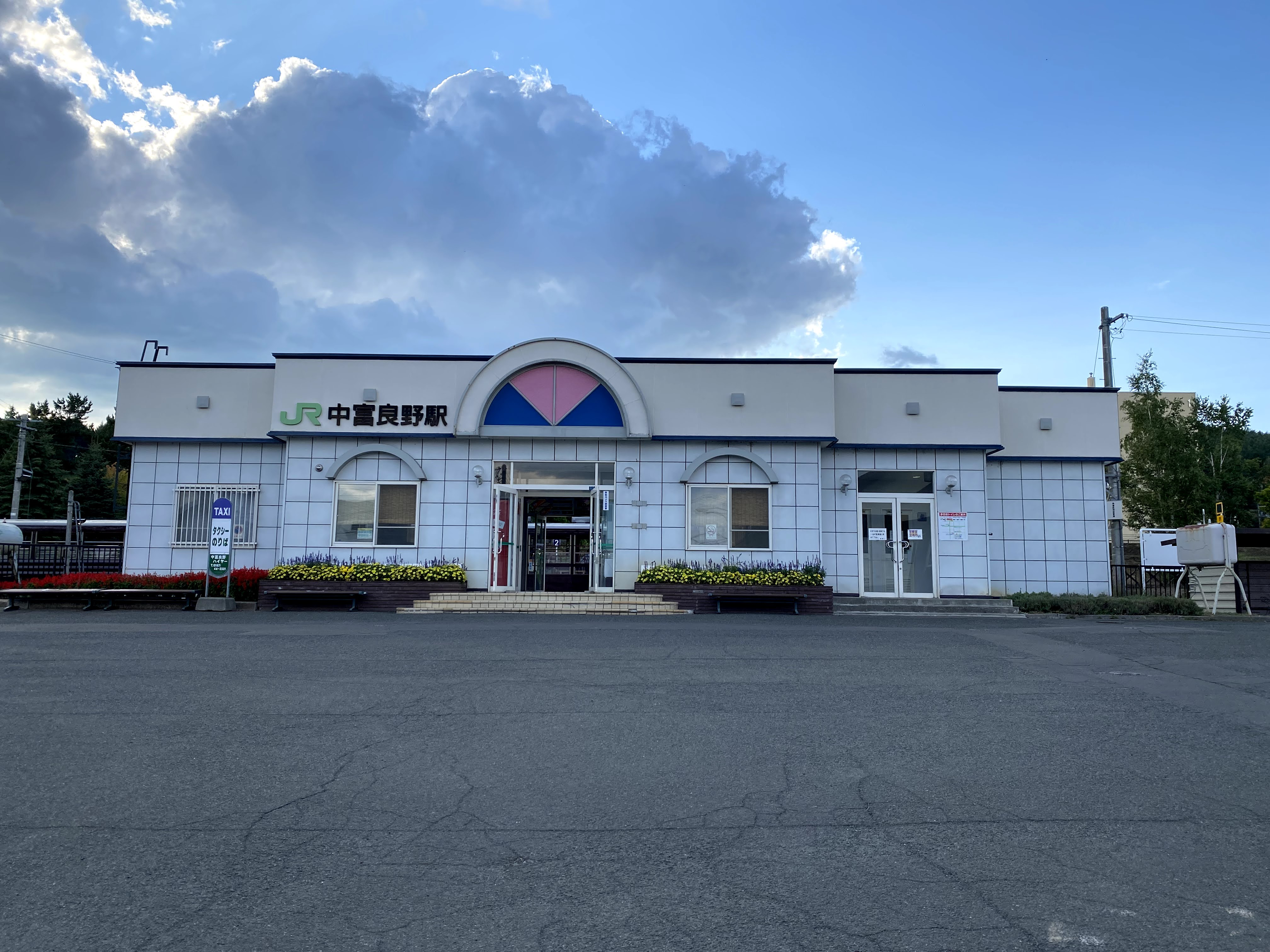
- Nakafurano Station in September, 2021

General information
- Location: 8 Nishi-machi, Nakafurano; Hokkaido Prefecture; Japan
- Coordinates: 43°24′20.41″N 142°25′14.88″E
- System: JR Hokkaido commuter rail station
- Owner: JR Hokkaido
- Operator: JR Hokkaido
- Line: Furano Line
- Distance: 47.3 km (29.4 miles) from Asahikawa
- Platforms: 2 side platform
- Tracks: 2

Construction
- Structure type: At grade

Other information
- Station code: F42
- Website: Official webcite

History
- Opened: 1 August 1900; 126 years ago

Services
Preceding station	JR Hokkaido	Following station
Lavender Farm F41 towards Asahikawa	Furano Line	Shikauchi F43 towards Furano
Location
- Location within Hokkaido Location within Japan

Naka-Furano Station (中富良野駅, Naka-furano-eki) is a train station located in Nakafurano, Hokkaidō, Japan. It is operated by the Hokkaido Railway Company. Only local trains stop. The station is assigned station number F42.

== Lines serviced ==
- Furano Line

== Surrounding Area ==
- Route 237
