= Gakuden Station =

Gakuden Station is the name of two train stations in Japan:

- Gakuden Station (Hokkaidō) (学田駅)
- Gakuden Station (Aichi) (楽田駅)
