= Puyuhuapi (volcanic group) =

Volcanic group of cinder cones in Chile

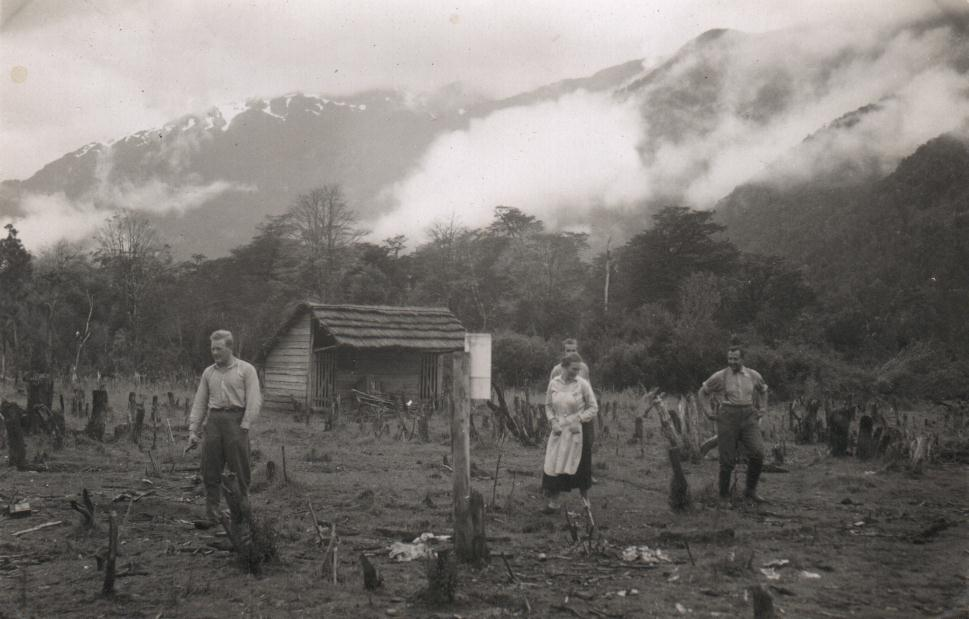
- 1930s Clearning stumps

Highest point
- Elevation: 524 m (1,719 ft)
- Coordinates: 44.3°S 72.53°W

Geography
- Location: Chile
- Parent range: Andes

Geology
- Mountain type: Cinder cones
- Last eruption: Unknown

Puyuhuapi Volcanic Group is a volcanic group of cinder cones located at the head of Puyuhuapi Channel, in the Aysén del General Carlos Ibáñez del Campo Region of Chile.

Puyuhuapi is one of the volcanoes in the southern segment of the Andean Southern Volcanic Zone, which includes a number of stratovolcanoes. South of this southern segment, a gap without volcanic activity separates the Southern Volcanic Zone from the Austral Volcanic Zone. Both volcanic zones are produced by the subduction of the Nazca Plate beneath the South American Plate, which takes place at a rate of 7.3 centimetres per year (2.9 in/year).

The volcanic field extends from the western side of the channel north over the head of the channel towards Lake Risopatrón, with one isolated cone found on the eastern side of the channel. The town of Puyuhuapi is located approximately halfway through the field. The cones on the western side are a separate group from the ones towards the north and associated with two different eruption fissures, but both fissures are associated with the Liquiñe-Ofqui fault zone. The basement on which the field is built is formed by rocks of the Patagonian Batholith.

The field is formed by cinder cones, while the isolated centre is formed by a fissure fed lava flow. The southernmost cone is also the largest with a diameter of 1,250 metres (4,100 ft) and features a 59 metres (194 ft) high secondary cone nested within its 700 metres (2,300 ft) wide summit crater. The eruption fissures also generated lava flows; the cones formed afterwards over the fissures. On the northern end of the Puyuhuapi channel, the eruptions filled part of the channel and separated Lake Risopatrón from it; this activity may have been phreatomagmatic in nature. Two edifices have a volume of 1.1 cubic kilometres (0.26 cu mi) and 0.1 cubic kilometres (0.024 cu mi) respectively.

The cones were constructed by basaltic andesite, which contains clinopyroxene, olivine and plagioclase. The petrologically primitive composition suggests that they were constructed from primitive asthenosphere derived magmas that reached the surface directly, through the Liquiñe-Ofqui fault system. The tectonic environment of the fault may impede the ascent of magma, thus the volcanoes have only small sizes.

The cones may be extremely young, one eruption with a volume of about 0.5 cubic kilometres (0.12 cu mi) may have occurred about 9,000 years ago based on stratigraphy, although the date is fairly uncertain. The glacial isostasy phenomena at the end of the last ice age may have triggered the magma ascent and thus eruptions. Presently, there is a cluster of earthquake activity close to the volcanic group. Warm water emerges in the form of hot springs.

== See also ==
- List of volcanoes in Chile
