= Daisetsuzan =

Daisetsuzan may refer to:

- Daisetsuzan National Park, located in the mountainous center of the northern Japanese island of Hokkaidō.
- Daisetsuzan Volcanic Group, volcanic group in Hokkaidō, Japan.
