= Nishinaka Station =

Railway station in Nakafurano, Hokkaido, Japan

F40 Nishinaka Station 西中駅
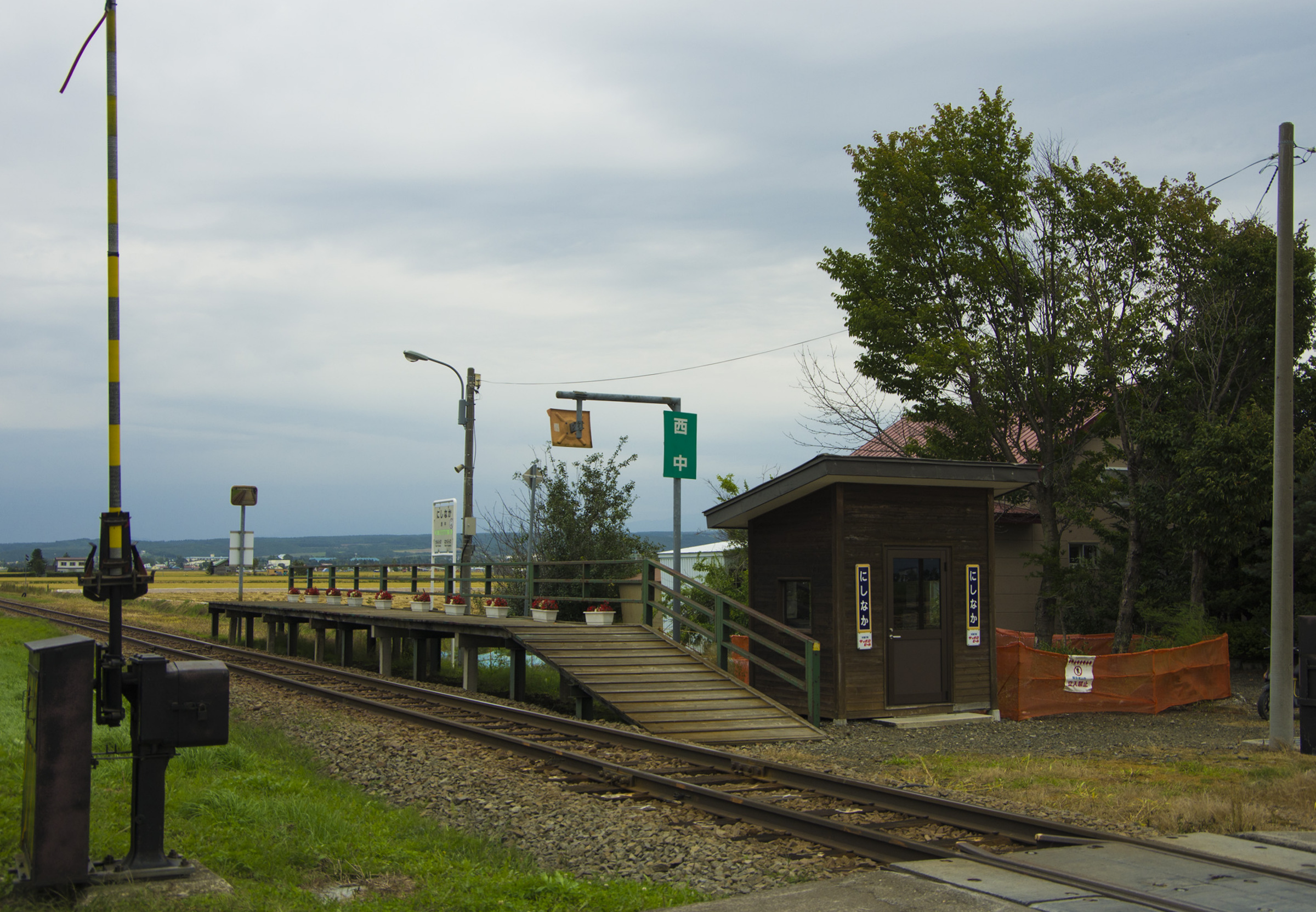
- Nishinaka Station in September 2013

General information
- Location: Nakafurano, Nakafurano; Hokkaido Prefecture; Japan
- Coordinates: 43°25′46.2″N 142°26′30.57″E
- System: JR Hokkaido commuter rail station
- Owner: JR Hokkaido
- Operator: JR Hokkaido
- Line: Furano Line
- Distance: 44.2 km (27.5 miles) from Asahikawa
- Platforms: 1 side platform
- Tracks: 1

Other information
- Station code: F40
- Website: Official website

History
- Opened: 25 March 1958; 68 years ago

Services
Preceding station	JR Hokkaido	Following station
Kami-Furano F39 towards Asahikawa	Furano Line	Lavender Farm F41 towards Furano
Location
- Location within Hokkaido Location within Japan

Nishinaka Station (西中駅, Nishinaka-eki) is a railway station on the Furano Line in Hokkaido, Japan, operated by the Hokkaido Railway Company (JR Hokkaido).

== Lines ==
Nishinaka Station is served by the Furano Line between Furano and Asahikawa, and the station is numbered "F40". Only all-stations "Local" services stop at this station.

== Surrounding Area ==
- Route 237

== See also ==
- List of railway stations in Japan
