= Farm Tomita =

Flower farm in Nakafurano

Coordinates: 43°25′10″N 142°25′40″E

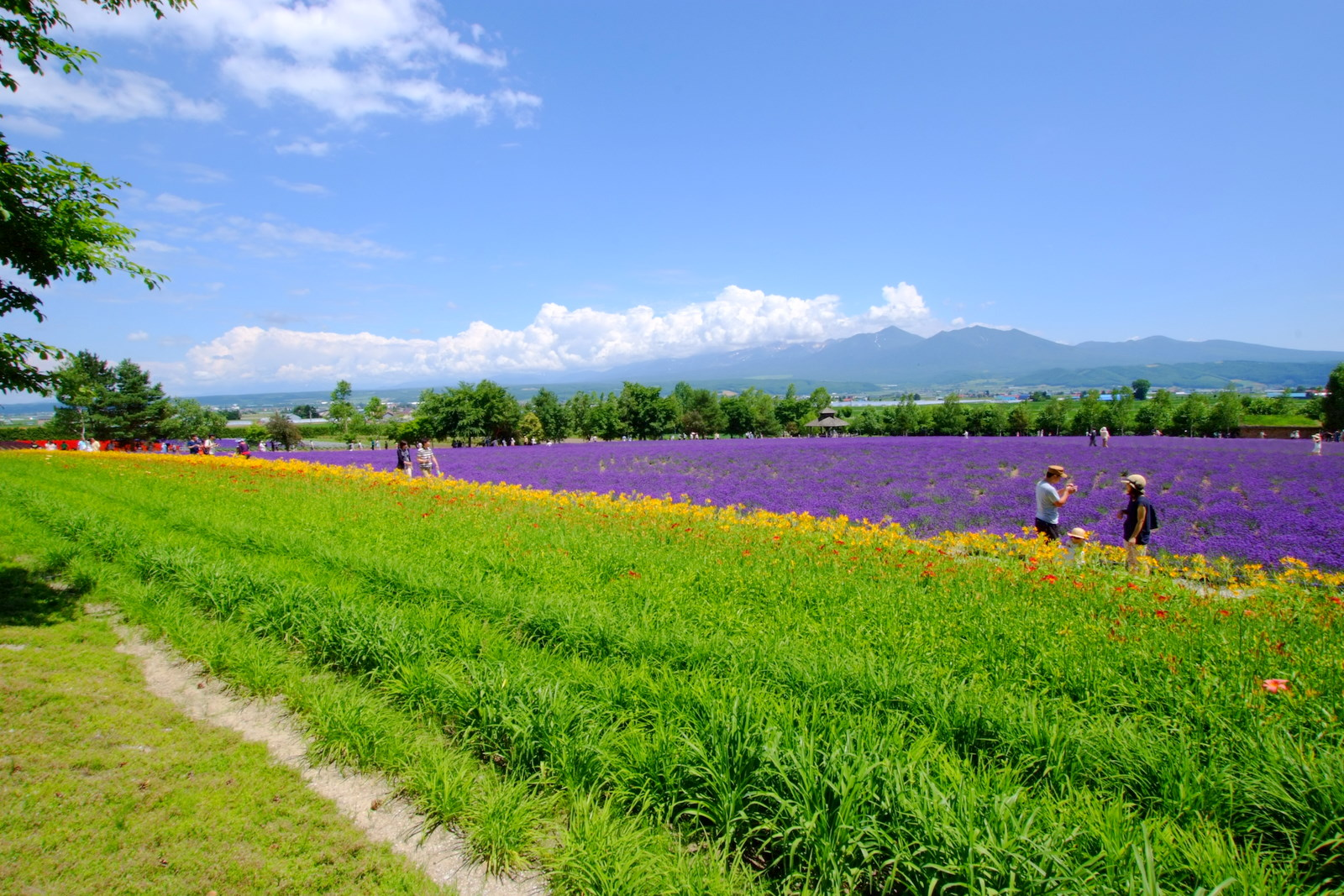
View of Farm Tomita Tokachi Mountains in the background.

Farm Tomita (ファーム富田) is a farm in Nakafurano, Hokkaido, Japan.

Renowned for its expansive lavender fields and colorful seasonal blooms, it is one of Hokkaido's most visited tourist destinations. The farm also produces a wide range of lavender-based products, including essential oils, perfumes, soaps, and food items.

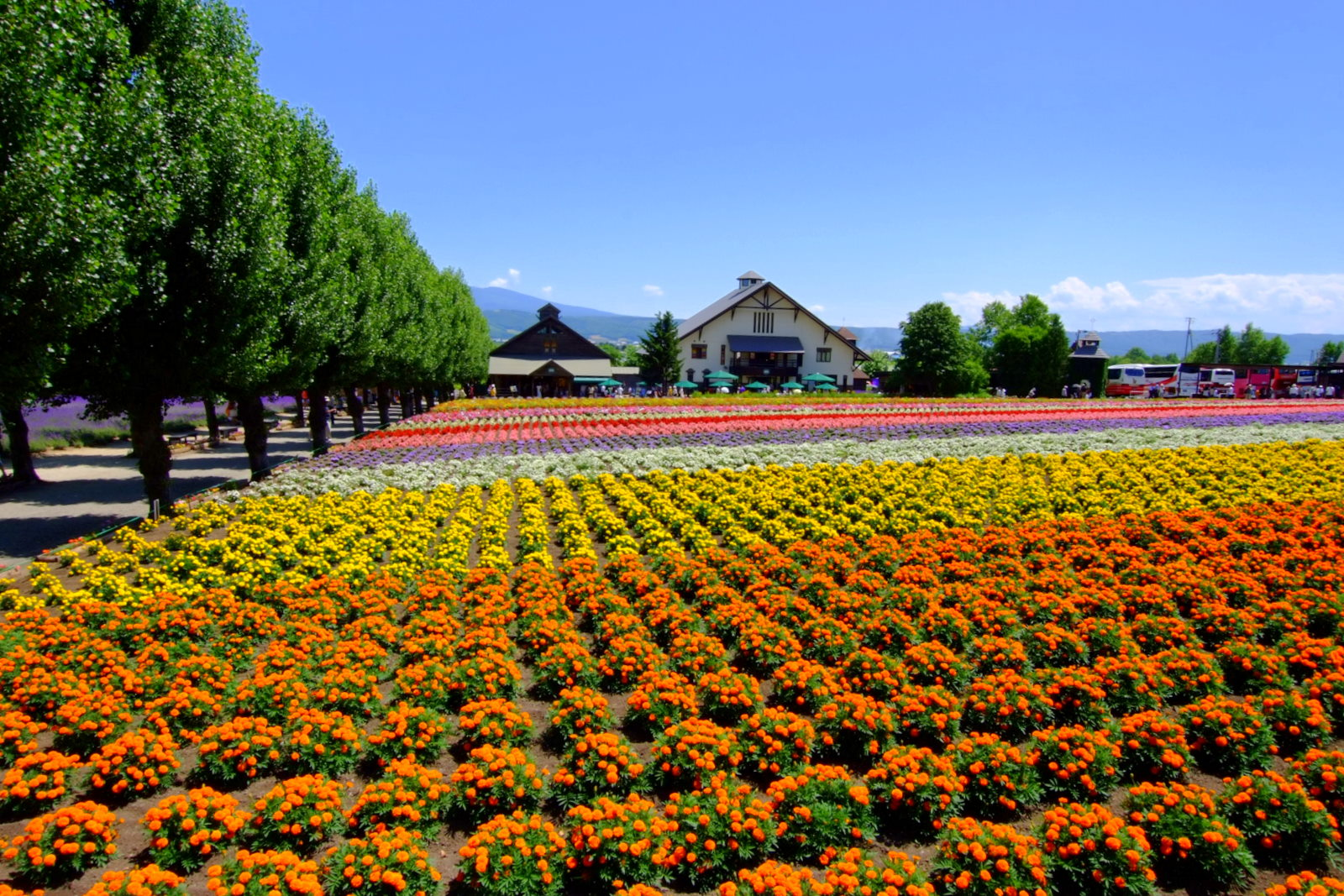
View of Farm Tomita
