= SOS incident =

Mountain rescue case in Japan during the 1980s

- Aerial view of the giant SOS sign
- Native name: SOS遭難事件
- Duration: 10 July 1984 – 28 February 1990
- Location: Mount Asahi, Daisetsuzan National Park, Hokkaidō, Japan
- Type: Disappearances, unsolved deaths, unexplained occurrences
- Cause: Unknown
- Outcome: Cold case
- Deaths: At least 1
- Missing: Kenji Iwamura, possibly others; Two missing hikers rescued

The SOS incident occurred in Mount Asahi in Daisetsuzan National Park in Japan in 1989. Two lost mountaineers were located and rescued after search teams spotted a large SOS message built from fallen birch logs, but the mountaineers had not created this message, which was determined to have been in place since at least 1987. After returning to search the area for more missing people the next day, police found skeletal remains in the vicinity (initially determined to belong to a female) in addition to personal belongings of a presumed-male hiker found stuffed into a tree root not far from the sign. The items included an ID (belonging to Kenji Iwamura, a man who had been missing since 1984), 2 cameras, a notebook, and a tape recorder with tapes featuring a distressed man calling for help. It is still not known who constructed the sign.

== Background ==
On the afternoon of 24 July 1989, on the path from Mount Kurodake to Mount Asahi of Daisetsuzan National Park, two Tokyo men were lost after mountaineering. While going through the climbing route, they deviated down Mount Asahi, south towards the Chubetsu river. The Hokkaido police searched in a helicopter and ended up finding a giant SOS sign made of 19 birch trees, each roughly 5 meters long. It was built by stacking felled birch trees. The two missing people were soon safely rescued 2–3 km north from the sign.

The Hokkaido police believed that the SOS letters made of wood had been constructed by the two people that they had rescued. However, when the police debriefed the two people about the situation after the rescue, they did not know anything about the SOS sign. The Hokkaido police, who thought that there was another victim, dispatched a helicopter again on the following day and searched the surrounding area.

=== Kenji Iwamura ===
The police discovered fragments of human bones with traces of animal bites. It appeared that some of the bones had been fractured prior to death. In a separate area near the SOS sign, the police discovered a hole just large enough to fit a single human, which included four cassette tapes, a tape recorder, a backpack, some amulets, a human skull, a tripod, a pair of men's basketball shoes, two cameras, a notebook, and the driver's license of Kenji Iwamura, a 25-year-old male office worker from Kōnan, Aichi Prefecture who had gone missing on 10 July 1984 after he set out hiking to Asahidake. When Iwamura failed to appear for work a week later, his parents asked police to search for him, but they found no trace. As of 2026, Iwamura has been missing for 41 years, and police believe that he is deceased.

The human bones were sent to Asahikawa Medical University and were identified initially as those of a woman aged 20–40 years. On 27 July, the police decided to play the recordings on the cassette tapes. On one of the recordings, the voice of a young man is heard shouting for 2 minutes and 17 seconds. A translation of the man shouting on the recording is as follows:

SOS; help me! (Note: Pronouns are commonly neglected in Japanese and instead assumed by the interpreter; listener or reader. The original recording of the deep voice does not contain the pronoun for "me", and is assumed in translations. The literal translation is, simply, the imperative "help.") I can't move on the cliff! SOS; help me!
The place is where I first met the helicopter! The sasa is deep, and I can't get up! Lift me up from here!

The rest of the tapes included music from the anime TV shows, Macross and Magical Princess Minky Momo. In addition, a cutout of artwork of "Magical Princess Minky Momo" was used as a case for the cassette tape. In regards to the SOS sign, the Japan Forestry Agency and the Japan Geographical Authority took a look at previous topographic map data used to find aerial photographs, in which it was confirmed that the SOS sign was in the images taken on 20 September 1987.

An acquaintance of Iwamura gave testimony that Iwamura had been carrying a recording of theme songs on a tape, as well as the same size of basketball shoes that were discovered in the recent search. On the other hand, since the human skeleton was initially identified as a female, it was thought by investigators that there were two men and a woman that had gone missing at the park. However, there was no record of the missing female in Asahidake and Iwamura was said to have gone alone into the mountain. The identity of the woman and the potential relationship to Iwamura was unknown and caused confusion in the investigation and media coverage.

The Asahikawa East police station announced on 28 February 1990 that after a reexamination of all the human bones that were found, they now believed that the skeleton was actually male, not female.

== Aspects of the case ==
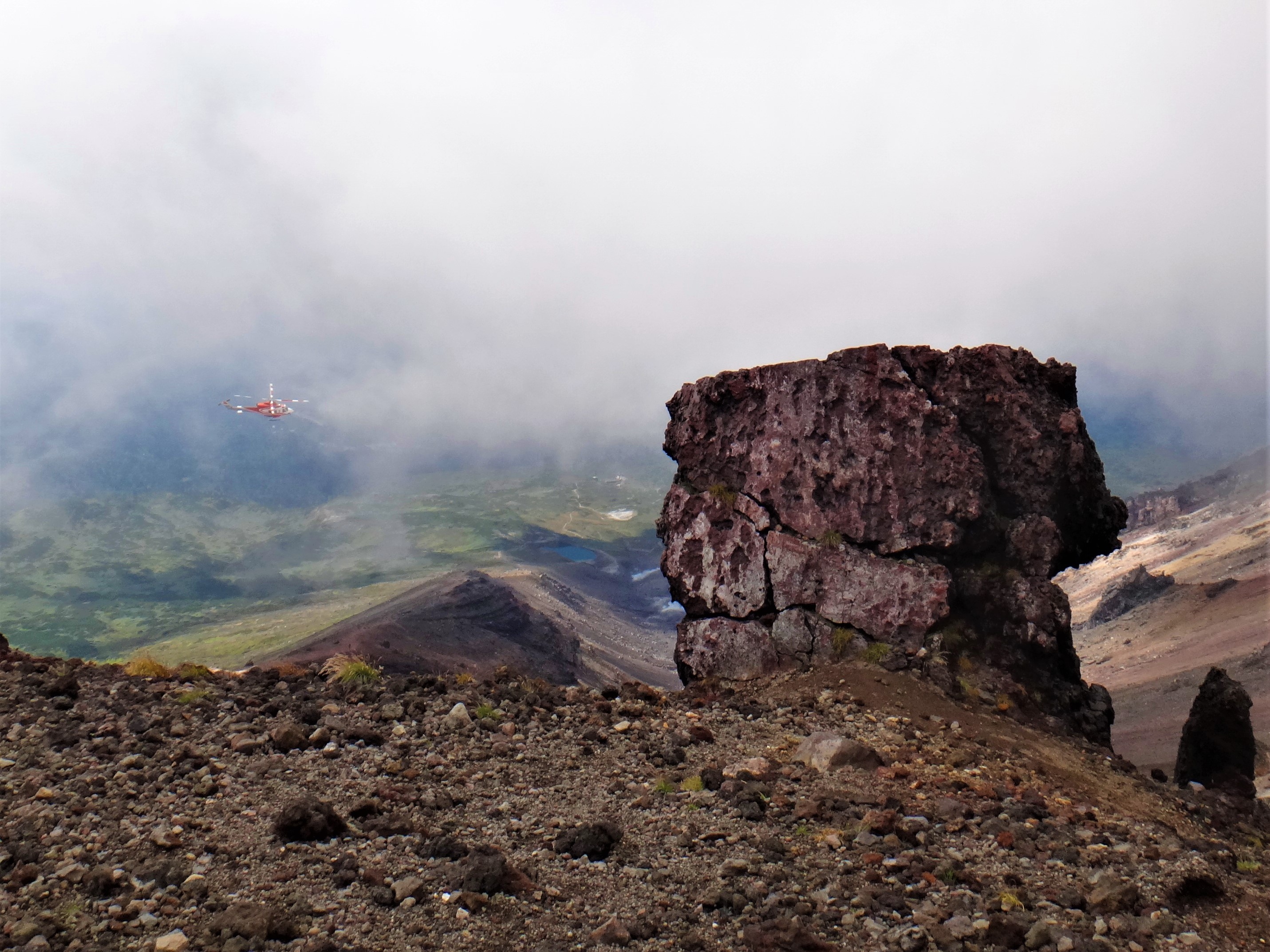
Safe Rock

=== Cause of the incident ===
There is a large rock nicknamed the "Kinko iwa" (Safe Rock) on the ridge of Mount Asahi which is used as a guidepost. The name comes from the fact that the rock looks like a giant square safe. However, there is also a similar large rock nicknamed the "Nise kinko iwa" (Fake Safe Rock) near the "Kinko iwa", and if one were to accidentally fall from the "Nise kinko iwa" they would be in the area where the SOS incident occurred. The slope above the main area is a dense sasa grove that grows sideways. It is easy to enter from the top, but it is difficult to climb from the bottom to the top. There is a cliff where the incident occurred. The terrain is difficult to escape; in fact, a few days after the incident was discovered, a news media interview team who visited the site was unable to escape from the area and had to be rescued.

=== The SOS sign ===
The wooden letters of the SOS sign were made by stacking large fallen birch trees, and it was estimated that it took about two days and considerable effort to create such a giant sign. It was speculated that the sign was made by the missing person that the skeleton belonged to, but in the autopsy of the skeleton that was found, who investigators believed was Iwamura, the body was described as thin and weak to the point that it would have been impossible for him to make the sign on his own. No axe that could have been used to cut trees down to make the sign has been found. Some have pointed out that Osamu Tezuka's Astro Boy has a scene in which fallen trees are arranged in the shape of SOS.

=== SOS tape recording ===
The purpose of the SOS tape recording is unknown, but it is speculated that the man on the recording, who was stuck, recorded it so that the search team could hear it before he became debilitated and unable to speak. It is also possible that it was accidentally switched on and recorded while the man was yelling for help. Many have speculated that the man yelling was Iwamura, but when Iwamura's parents were asked about the recording, they could not confirm that the voice on the recording was their son's.

== See also ==
- List of unsolved deaths
