= Shikaribetsu Volcanic Group =

Volcanic group on the island of Hokkaido, Japan

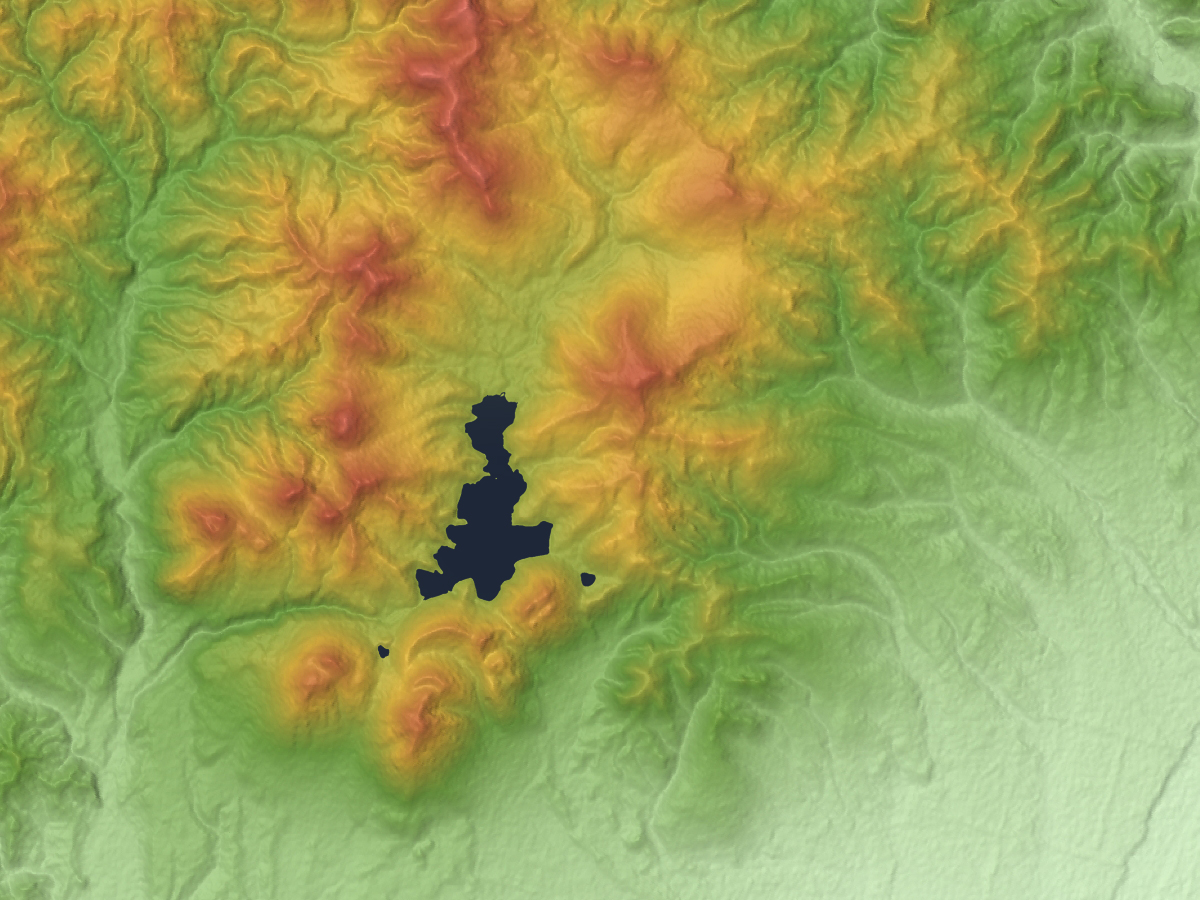

Highest point
- Peak: Mount Kita Petoutoru, Tokachi Subprefecture
- Elevation: 1,401 m (4,596 ft)
- Coordinates: 43°18′44″N 143°5′44″E

Naming
- Native name: 然別火山群 (Japanese); Shikaribetsu-kazangun (Japanese)

Geography
- Country: Japan
- State: Hokkaidō
- Parent range: Ishikari Mountains
- Biome: alpine climate

Geology
- Orogeny: island arc
- Rock age: Quaternary
- Rock type: volcanic

Shikaribetsu volcanic group (然別火山群, Shikaribetsu-kazangun) is a volcanic group of lava domes surrounding Lake Shikaribetsu in Hokkaidō, Japan. The Shikaribetsu volcanic group is located in Daisetsuzan National Park. The volcanic group lies on the Kurile arc of the Pacific ring of fire.

The volcanic group includes the following peaks:

- Mount Higashi Nupukaushi
- Mount Nishi Nupukaushi
- Mount Tenbo
- Mount Hakuun

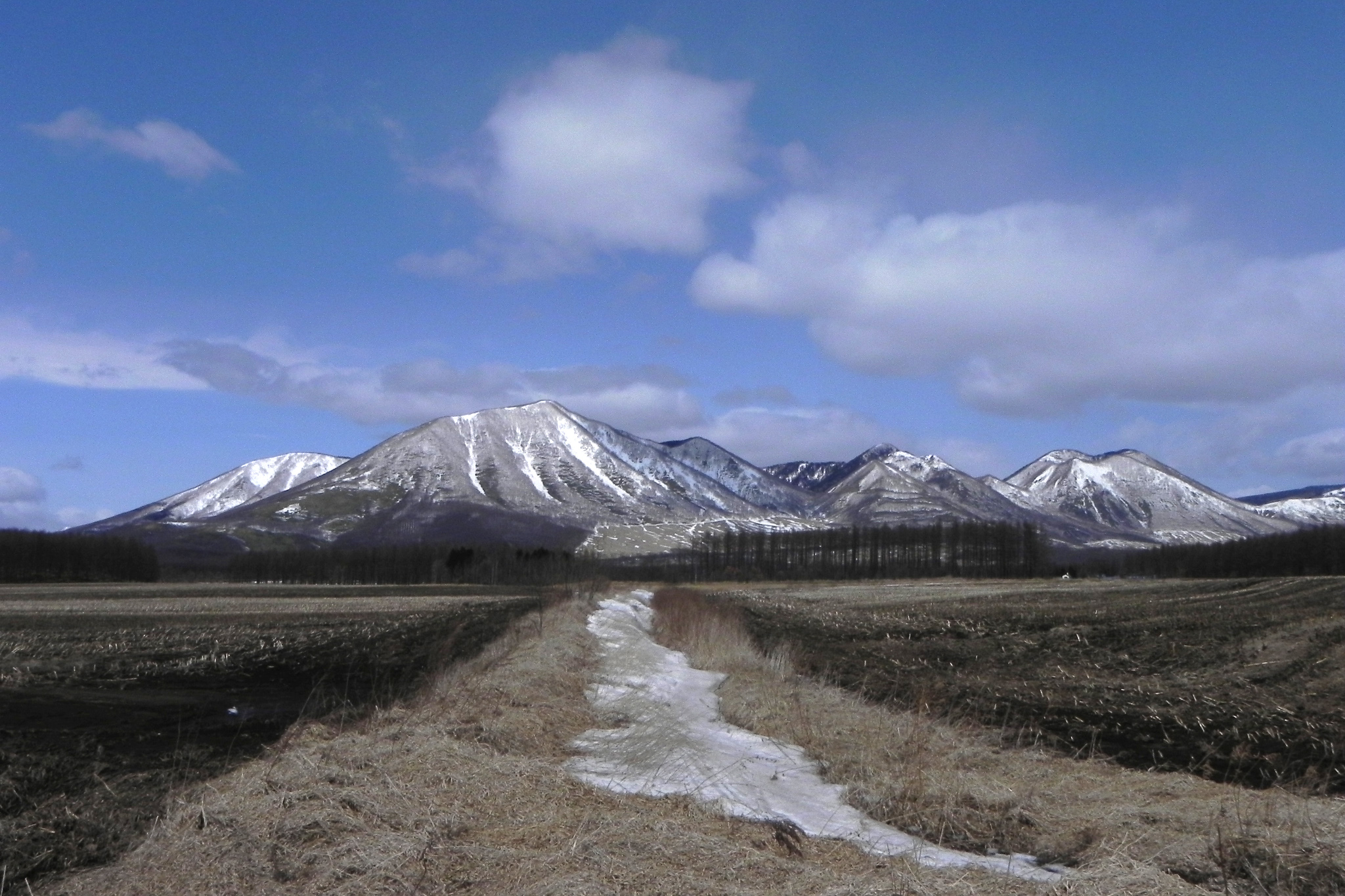
Shikaribetsu Volcanic Group as seen from the SSE. Mount Higashi Nupukaushi in the center left.

== See also ==
- List of volcanoes in Japan
