= Olkhovy Volcanic Group =

Mountain in Kamchatka Peninsula, Russia

Highest point
- Elevation: 681 m (2,234 ft)
- Coordinates: 52.02°N 157.53°E

Geography
- Location: Kamchatka, Russia

Geology
- Mountain type: Volcanic group

Olkhovy Volcanic Group (Russian: Группа Ольхового) is a volcanic group located in the southern part of Kamchatka Peninsula, Russia. The group includes the shield volcano Olkhovy and the volcanic cone Plosky. The volcanos are dormant.

== See also ==
- List of volcanoes in Russia
