= Spences Bridge Group =

The Spences Bridge Group is a 100-million-year-old volcanic group of the southern Intermontane Belt in British Columbia, Canada. It consists of two stratigraphic units called the Pimainus Formation and the Spius Formation. The Spius Formation represents a shield volcano whereas the underlying Pimainus Formation is interpreted to be a set of stratovolcanoes.

== See also ==
- Volcanism of Canada
- Volcanism of Western Canada
