= Mount Bebetsu =

Mountain in Hokkaido, Japan

- ベベツ岳

Highest point
- Elevation: 1,860 m (6,100 ft)
- Listing: List of mountains and hills of Japan by height
- Coordinates: 43°27′48″N 142°44′5″E

Geography
- Location: Hokkaidō, Japan
- Parent range: Tokachi Volcanic Group
- Topo map(s): Geographical Survey Institute, 25000:1 白金温泉, 50000:1 十勝岳

Geology
- Mountain type: volcanic
- Volcanic arc: Kuril arc

Mount Bebetsu (ベベツ岳, Bebetsu-dake) is a mountain located in the Tokachi Volcanic Group, Hokkaidō, Japan.
