= Mount Furano =

Mountain in Japan

- 富良野岳
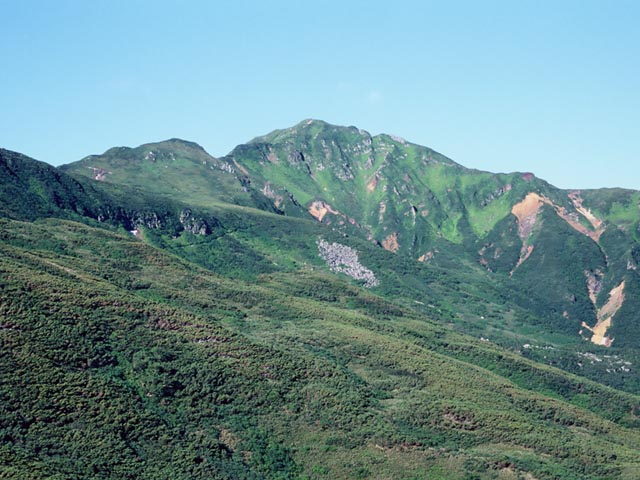
- Mount Furano (July 2006)

Highest point
- Elevation: 1,912.1 m (6,273 ft)
- Listing: List of mountains and hills of Japan by height
- Coordinates: 43°23′37″N 142°38′5″E

Geography
- Location: Hokkaidō, Japan
- Parent range: Tokachi Volcanic Group
- Topo map(s): Geographical Survey Institute of Japan 25000:1 十勝岳; 50000:1 十勝岳

Geology
- Rock age: Quaternary
- Mountain type: stratovolcano
- Volcanic arc: Kuril arc

Mount Furano (富良野岳, Furano-dake) is a mountain located in the Tokachi Volcanic Group, Hokkaidō, Japan.

== See also ==
- Daisetsuzan National Park
