= Volcanic group =

Collection of related volcanoes or volcanic landforms

A volcanic group, depending on context, is either (1) a group of related volcanoes in the form of volcanic fields, volcanic complexes and cone clusters, or (2) a stratigraphic group consisting of volcanic strata.

== Notable volcanic groups ==
Volcanic Group	Location
Akan Volcanic Complex	Japan
Altiplano-Puna volcanic complex	Argentina, Bolivia, and Chile
Antillanca Group	Chile
Azuma Group	Japan
Borrowdale Volcanic Group	United Kingdom
Carmacks Group	Canada
Carrán-Los Venados	Chile
Cochiquito Volcanic Group	Argentina
Coppermine River Group	Canada
Dacht-i-Navar Group	Afghanistan
Daisetsuzan Volcanic Group	Japan
Duluth Complex	United States
Ellesmere Island Volcanics	Canada
Fueguino	Chile
Gambier Group	Canada
Hakkōda Mountains	Japan
Jemez Mountains	United States
Kaiserstuhl	Germany
Karpinsky Group	Russia
Lomonosov Group	Russia
Meager Group	Canada
Milbanke Sound Group	Canada
Monti della Tolfa	Italy
Mount Edziza volcanic complex	Canada
Mount Raiden Volcanic Group	Japan
Nipesotsu-Maruyama Volcanic Group	Japan
Niseko Volcanic Group	Japan
Northern Yatsugatake Volcanic Group	Japan
Olkhovy Volcanic Group	Russia
Pinacate Peaks	Mexico
Pocdol Mountains	Philippines
Puyuhuapi (volcanic group)	Chile
Shikaribetsu Volcanic Group	Japan
Skukum Group	Canada
Southern Yatsugatake Volcanic Group	Japan
Spences Bridge Group	Canada
Takuan Group	Papua New Guinea
Tatun Volcano Group	Taiwan
Tokachi Volcanic Group	Japan
Tomuraushi Volcanic Group	Japan
Yasawa Group	Fiji

== See also ==
- Complex volcano – Landform of more than one related volcanic centre
- Compton–Belkovich Thorium Anomaly – Lunar hotspot
- Geomorphology – Scientific study of landforms
- Landforms – Feature of the solid surface of a planetary body
- Lists of volcanoes
- Types of volcanic eruptions – Volcanic event
