= Biei Fuji =

Japanese mountain

- 美瑛富士
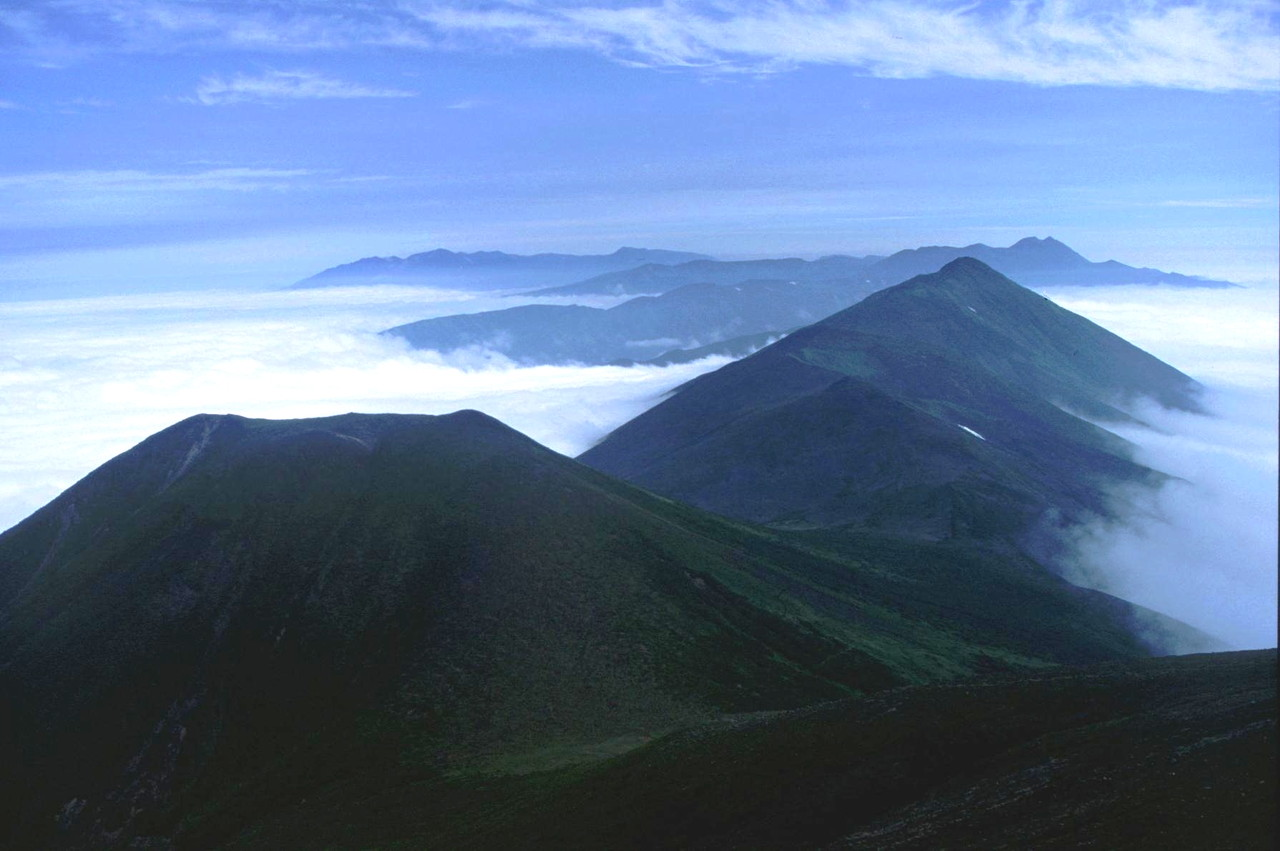
- Biei Fuji (left) and Mount Oputateshike (right) from Mount Biei

Highest point
- Elevation: 1,888 m (6,194 ft)
- Listing: List of mountains and hills of Japan by height
- Coordinates: 43°27′10″N 142°42′49″E

Geography
- Location: Hokkaidō, Japan
- Parent range: Tokachi Volcanic Group
- Topo map(s): 25000:1 白金温泉, 50000:1 十勝岳

Geology
- Mountain type: volcanic
- Volcanic arc: Kuril arc

Biei Fuji (美瑛富士, Biei Fuji) is a mountain located in the Tokachi Volcanic Group, Hokkaidō, Japan.

== See also ==
- Tokachi Volcanic Group
- Central Ishikari Mountains
- Daisetsuzan National Park
