= Asahi-dake =

Stratovolcano on the island of Hokkaido

Mount Asahi
- 旭岳 Asahi-dake; Kamui-mintara
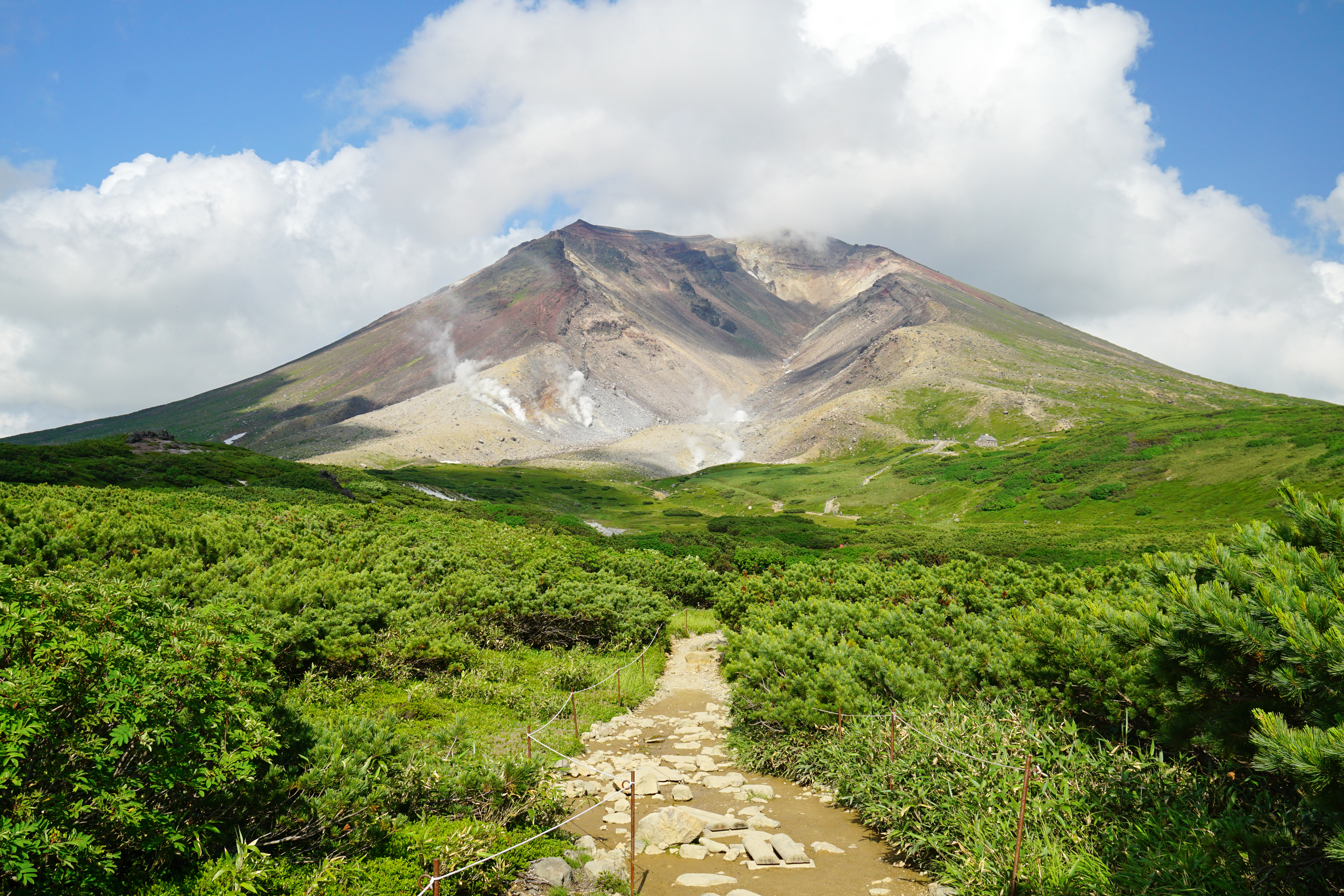
- Asahi-dake, the tallest mountain peak in Hokkaido (July 2014)

Highest point
- Elevation: 2,290.9 m (7,516 ft)
- Prominence: 2,290.9 m (7,516 ft)
- Listing: List of mountains and hills of Japan by height List of ultra prominent peaks List of volcanoes in Japan; Ribu
- Coordinates: 43°39′N 142°51′E

Naming
- Language of name: Japanese

Geography
- Location within Japan
- Location: Higashikawa, Kamikawa Subprefecture, Hokkaido, Japan
- Parent range: Daisetsuzan Volcanic Group
- Topo map(s): Geographical Survey Institute 25000:1 旭岳; 25000:1 愛山溪温泉; 50000:1 大雪山; 50000:1 旭岳

Geology
- Rock age: Holocene
- Mountain type: Stratovolcano
- Last eruption: 1739

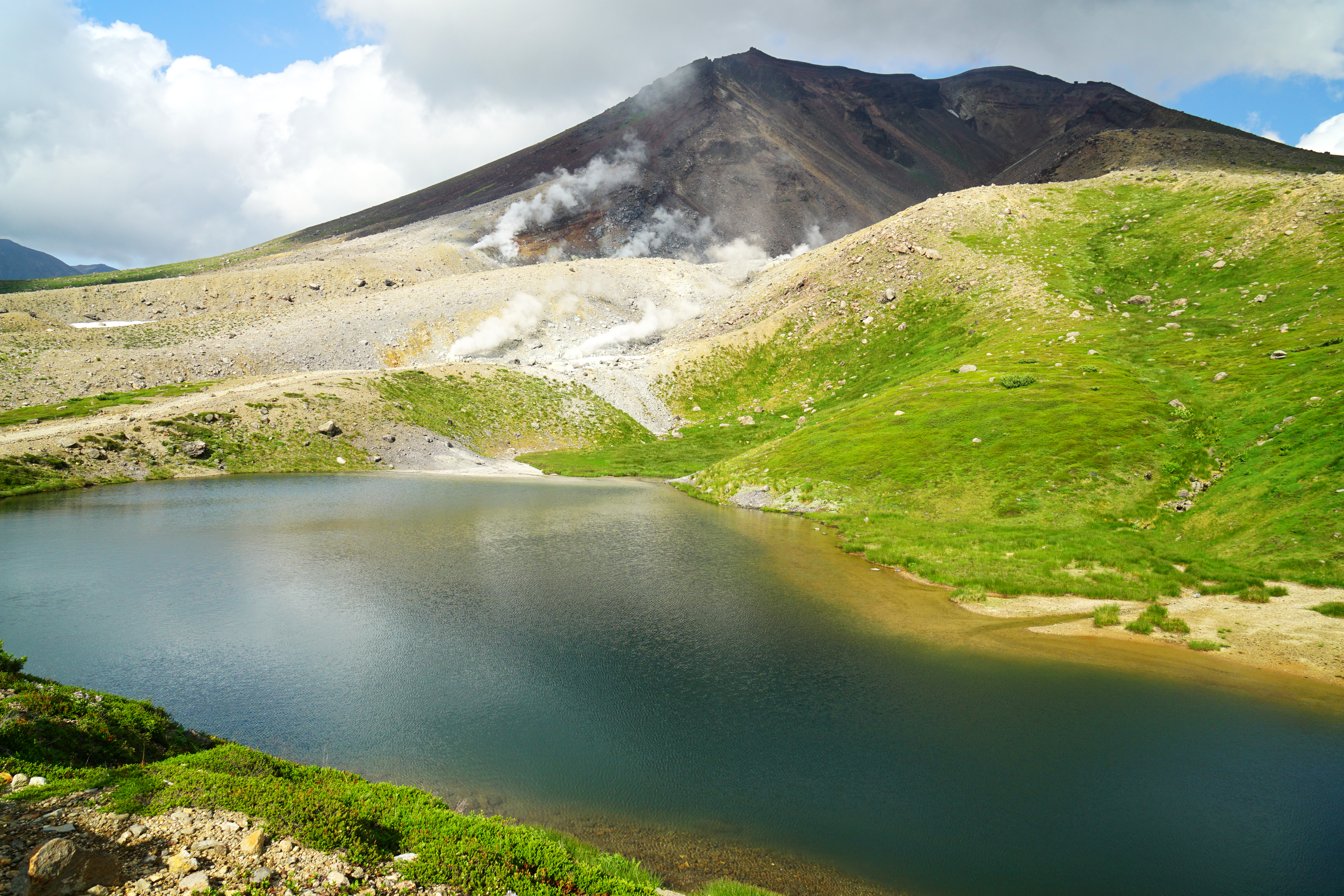
Asahi-dake, the tallest mountain peak in Hokkaido, with Sugatami Pond in the foreground

Mount Asahi (旭岳, Asahi-dake) is a stratovolcano located near the town of Higashikawa, Hokkaido and the tallest mountain on the Japanese island of Hokkaido. It is part of the Daisetsuzan Volcanic Group of the Ishikari Mountains, located in the northern part of the Daisetsuzan National Park.

Its native Ainu name is Kamui-mintara, which means "the playground of the gods".

The mountain is popular with hikers in the summer and can be easily reached from Asahidake Onsen via Asahidake Ropeway. During winter, the mountain is open for use by skiers and snowboarders.

Sugatami Pond, directly below the peak, is famous for its reflection of the peaks, snow, and steam escaping from the volcanic vents.

== History ==
Sulphur was once mined in the fumarolic areas. In 1989, the mountain was the site of SOS incident, an unsolved case involving missing hikers.

== Geology ==
Mount Asahi is an active stratovolcano, 2,291 metres (7,516 ft) in height that arose 3 kilometres (1.9 mi) southwest of the Ohachi-Daira caldera. The Japan Meteorological Agency gave the region rank C in volcanic activity. The volcano consists mainly of andesite and dacite, Holocene volcanic non-alkali mafic rock less than 18,000 years old. In addition to the main peak, there is a smaller volcano emerging from the southeast shoulder of the mountain, Mount Ushiro Asahi or Rear Mount Asahi (後旭岳, Ushiro-Asahi-dake).

=== Eruptive history ===
Whilst there is no historical record of the eruptions of Mount Asahi, tephrochronology and radiocarbon dating have determined the following events:

- 3200 BC ± 75 years, Asahi Soria deposit, corrected radiocarbon dating, explosive eruption
- 2800 BC ± 100 years, As-A tephra, corrected radiocarbon dating, explosive eruption and phreatic explosions
- 1450 BC ± 50 years, As-B tephra, uncorrected radiocarbon dating, explosive eruption and phreatic explosions
- 500 BC ± 50 years, Ash-b tephra, tephrochronology, explosive eruption and phreatic explosions and debris avalanches
- 1739, tephrochronology, explosive eruption and phreatic explosions with possible eruption of the central vent and radial good

Mount Asahi currently exhibits steam activity in the form of fumaroles.

== See also ==
- List of volcanoes in Japan
- List of mountains in Japan
