= Carmacks Group =

Canadian volcanic group in the Yukon

Coordinates: 62°N 136°W

The Carmacks Group is a volcanic group of Late Cretaceous age in southwestern Yukon, Canada. It contains epiclastic breccias and sintered tuffs, as well as basaltic, trachybasaltic and tristanitic lava flows. These deposits are interbedded with volcanic sandstone and are chemically calc-alkaline to alkaline. The chemical composition of the Carmacks Group is typical of volcanism along subduction zones. The assumption that the Carmacks Group represents a displaced portion of the Yellowstone hotspot track lacks geologic credibility.

== See also ==
- Volcanism of Northern Canada
