= Asahidake Onsen =

Hot spring village in Hokkaidō Prefecture, Japan

- Yukomambetsu Onsen
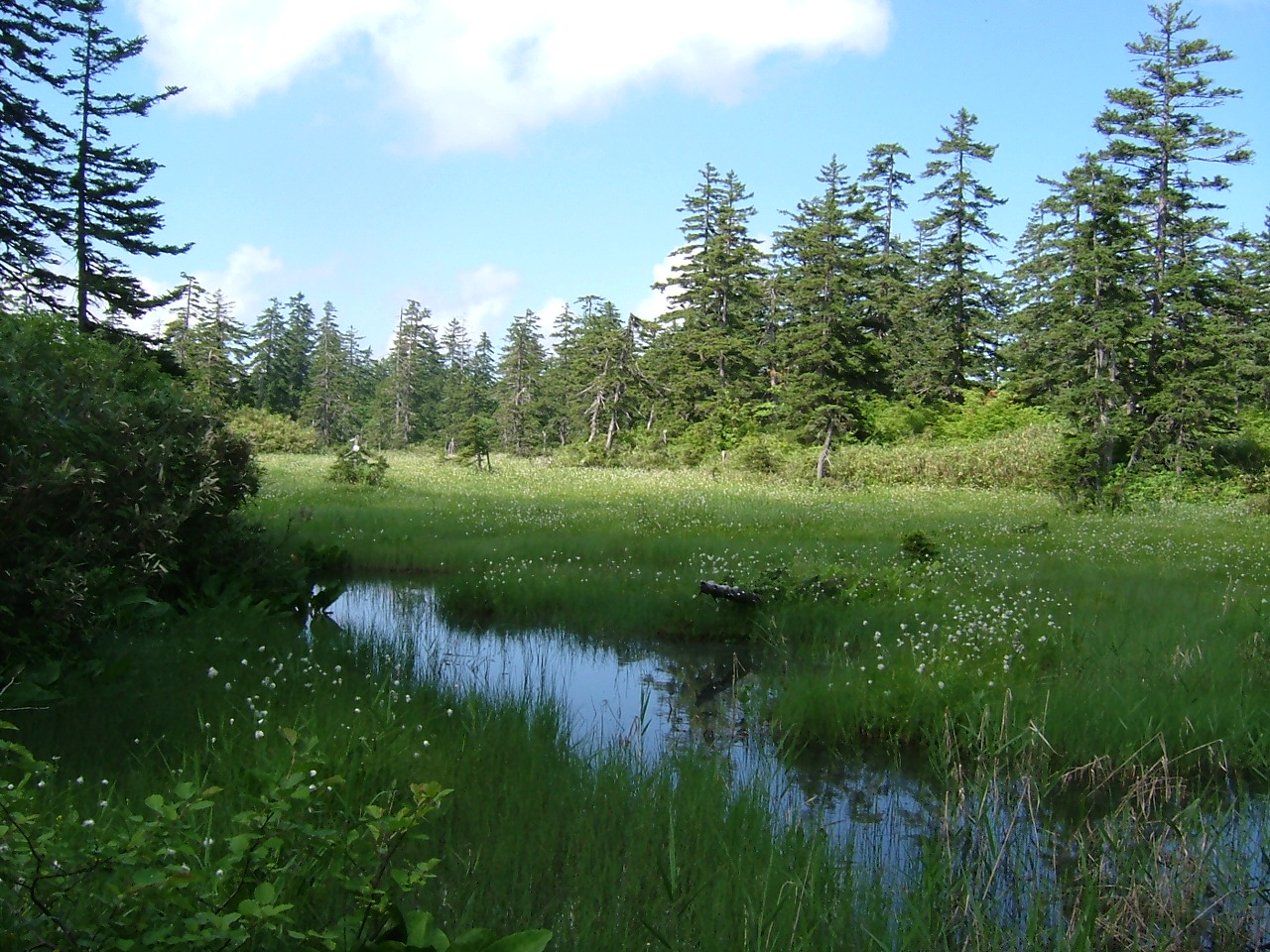
- View from a hiking path in Asahidake Onsen
- Interactive map of Asahidake Onsen
- Coordinates: 43°38′54″N 142°47′28″E
- Type: volcanic

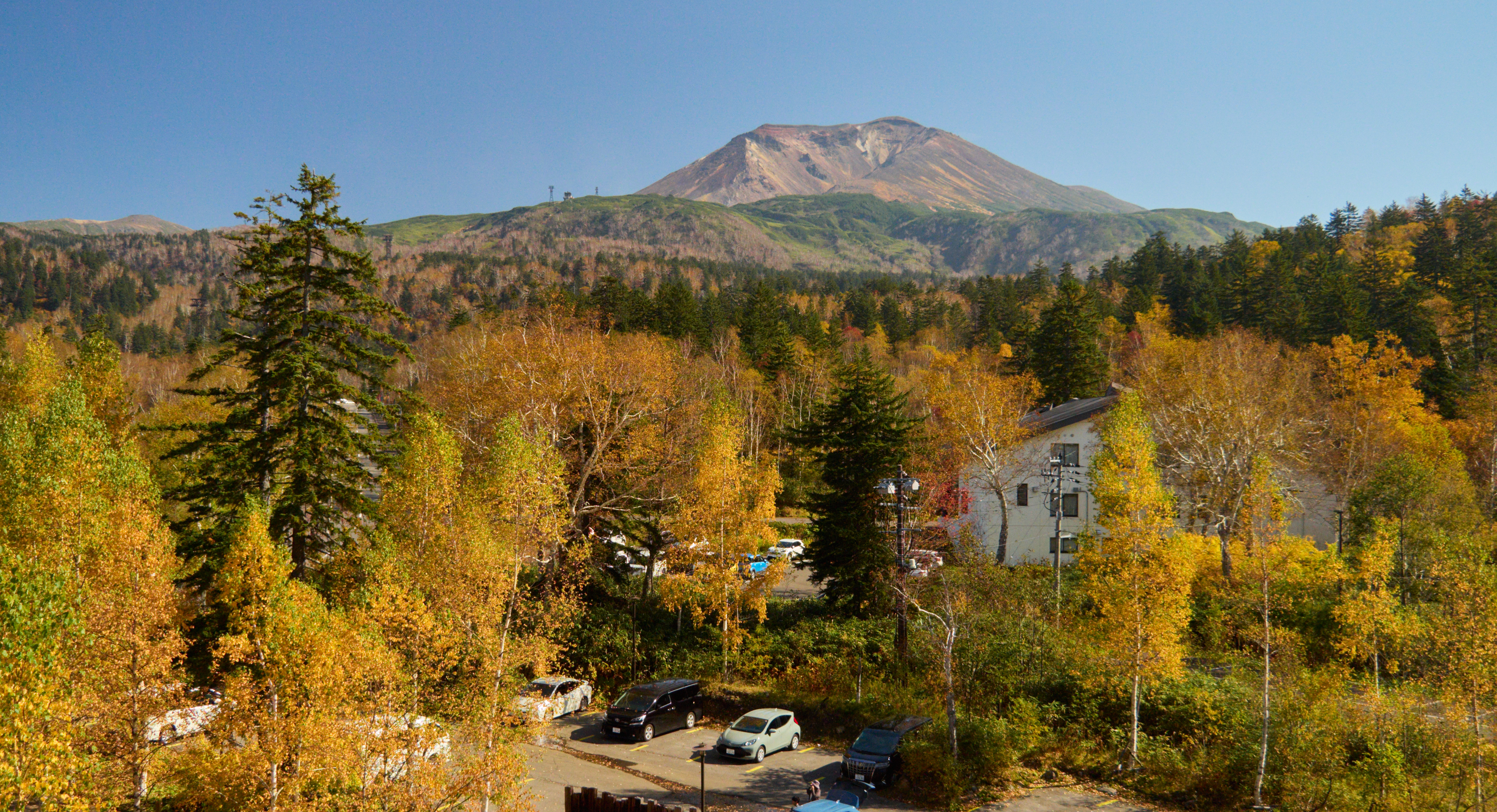
View of Asahidake from Asahidake Onsen, in autumn

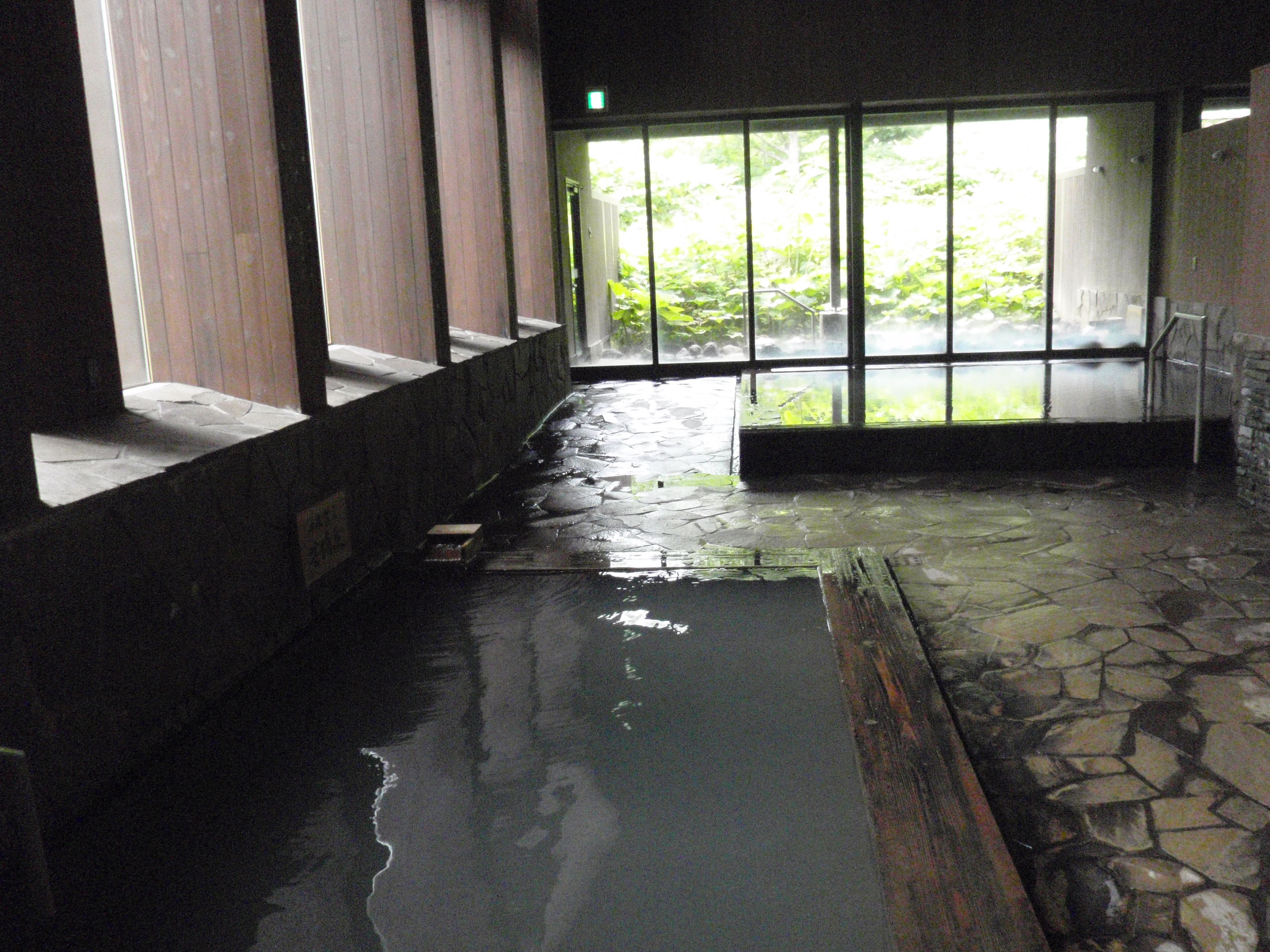
Asahidake hot spring soaking pool

Asahidake Onsen (旭岳温泉) is a small village in Daisetsuzan National Park, Kamikawa Subprefecture, Hokkaidō, Japan.

== History ==
The hot springs at Asahidake mountain were discovered during the early Taisho Era (1912–1926). The original name for the springs were Yukomambetsu Onsen.

== Water profile ==
The hot mineral spring water contains metasilicic acid in elevated quantities, which is used by some as a skin moisturizing agent.

== Description ==
Within the village limits are a few onsen hotels, a youth hostel and several wood-framed lodges. It a popular base for hikers in the national park, and for tourists using Asahidake Ropeway to climb Asahi-dake, Hokkaidō's highest mountain peak. There are several natural primitive hot springs, and also a hot springs resort, with approximately twelve buildings. The nearby ropeway costs 1800 or 2800 yen, depending on the time of year.

There are several hiking and walking trails in the area range from 30- to 60-minute walks all the way up to one- or two-day tours of the area's mountains. The area is volcanic, and evidence of such activity is plentiful. There are also opportunities for skiing in the area during the winter.

There are buses that run to and from the village year-round.
