= Mount Tokachi (Daisetsuzan) =

Active volcano on the island of Hokkaido, Japan

- 十勝岳
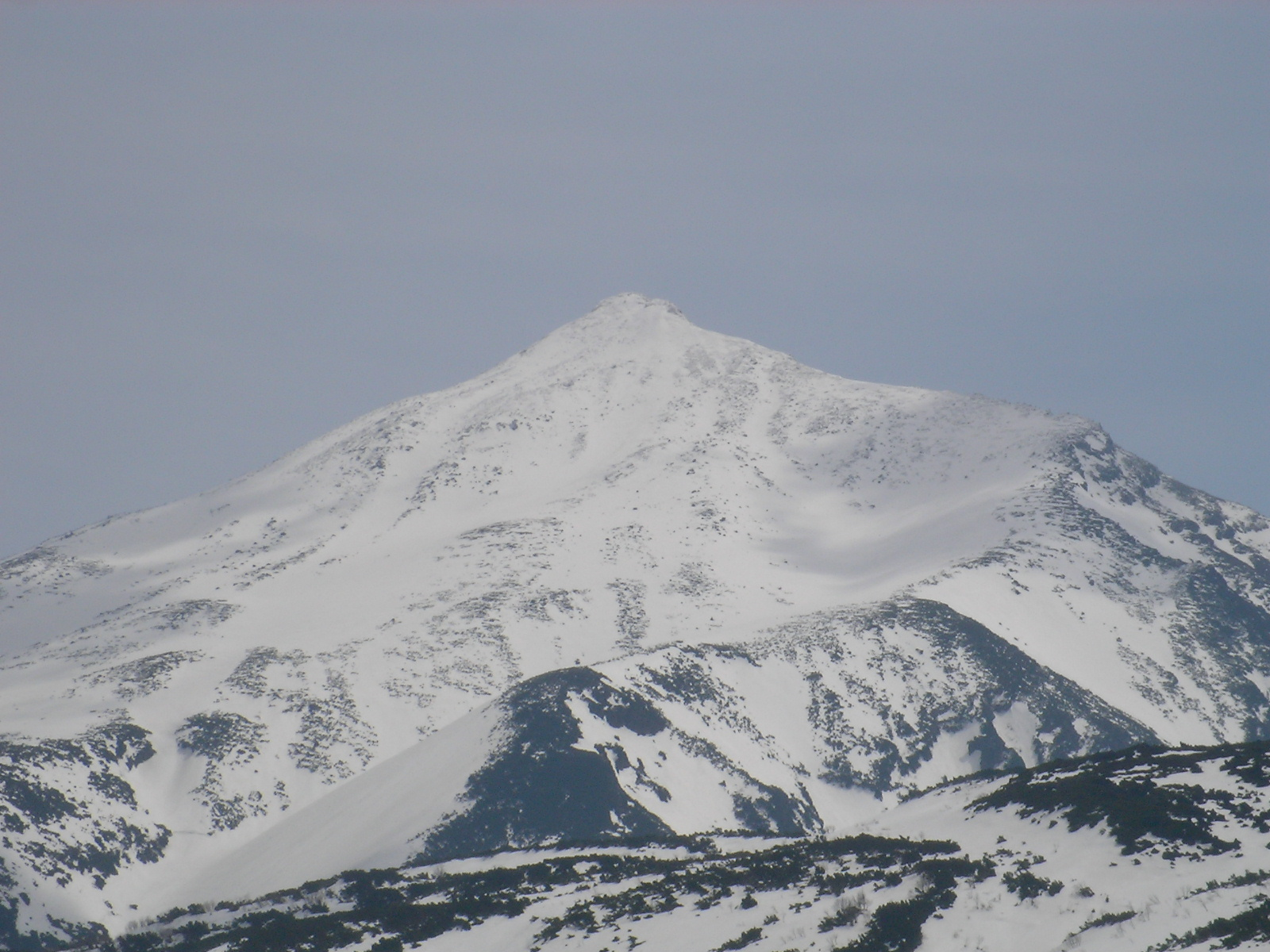
- Mount Tokachi May 2006

Highest point
- Elevation: 2,077 m (6,814 ft)
- Listing: List of mountains and hills of Japan by height List of the 100 famous mountains in Japan; List of volcanoes in Japan
- Coordinates: 43°25′N 142°41′E

Geography
- Location within Hokkaido
- Location: Hokkaidō, Japan
- Parent range: Tokachi Volcanic Group
- Topo map(s): Geographical Survey Institute of Japan 25000:1 十勝岳; 25000:1白金温泉; 50000:1 十勝岳

Geology
- Rock age: Quaternary
- Mountain type: Stratovolcano
- Volcanic arc: Kuril arc
- Last eruption: February to April 2004

Mount Tokachi (十勝岳, Tokachidake) is an active volcano located in Daisetsuzan National Park, Hokkaidō, Japan. It is the tallest volcano of the Tokachi Volcanic Group, with a height of 2,077 metres (6,814 ft). It is one of the 100 famous mountains in Japan.

On 12 September 2026, the Sapporo District Meteorological Observatory raised Tokachidake's eruption warning from Level 2 to Level 3, restricting climbing on and around dangerous areas of the mountain.

There are four hiking trails to the peak of Tokachidake. Below is a hut, a campground and a natural hot spring (onsen).

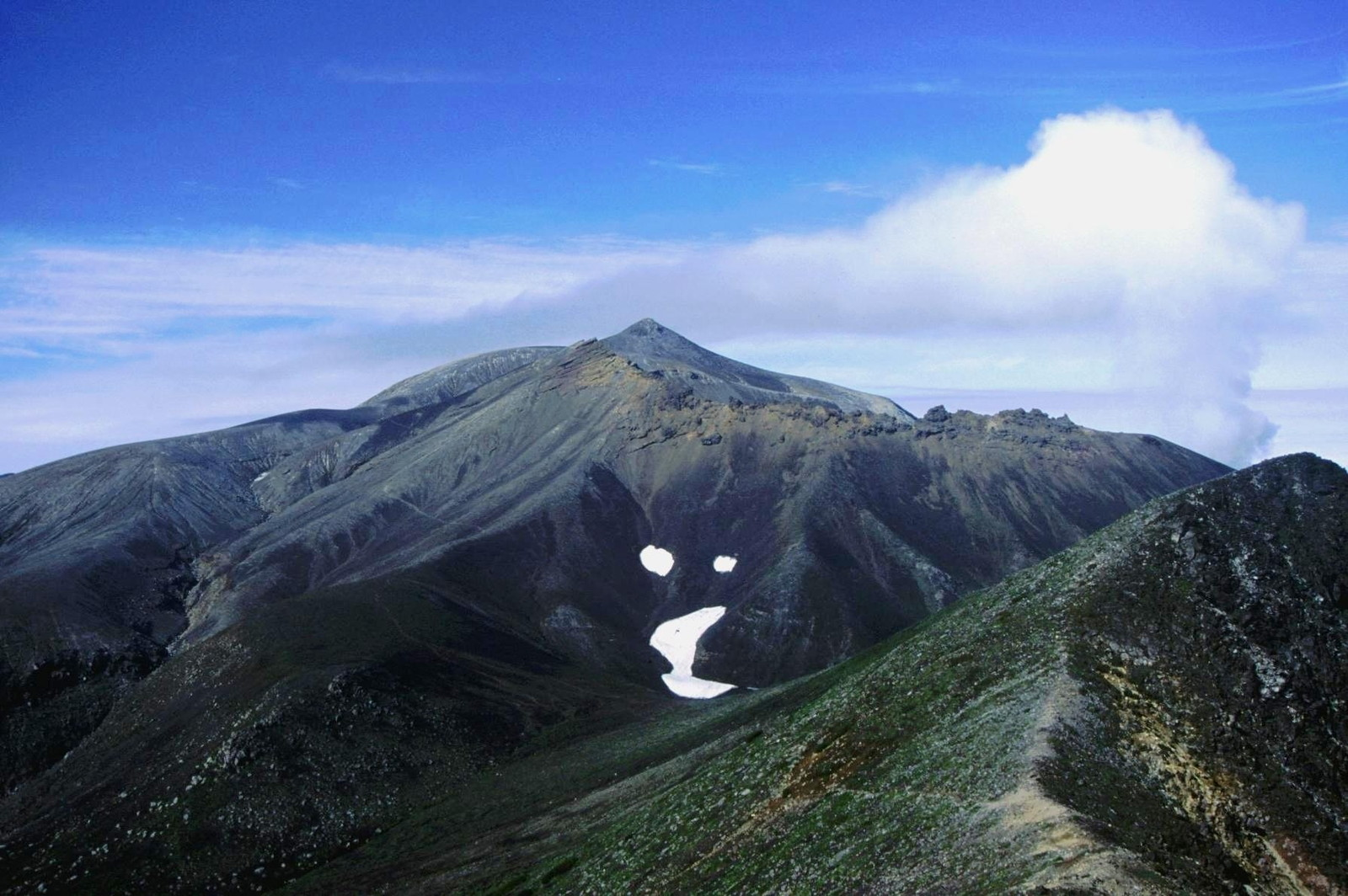
Mount Tokachi is a volcano, seen from Mount Biei

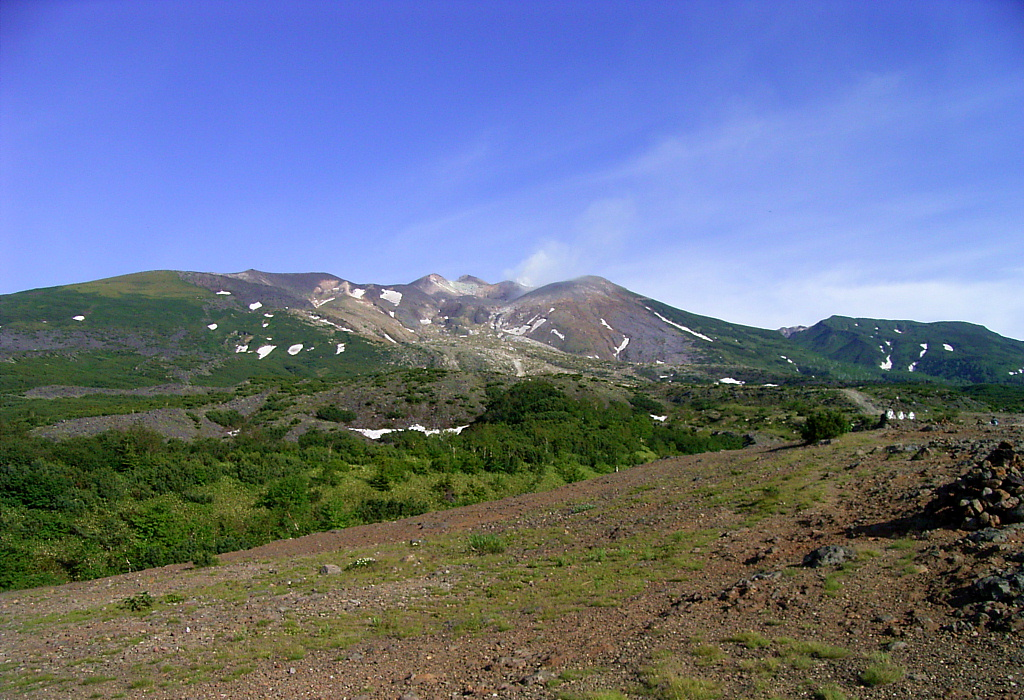
Seen from the northwest.

== See also ==
- List of volcanoes in Japan
- List of mountains in Japan
