= Mount Kamihorokamettoku =

- 上ホロカメットク山
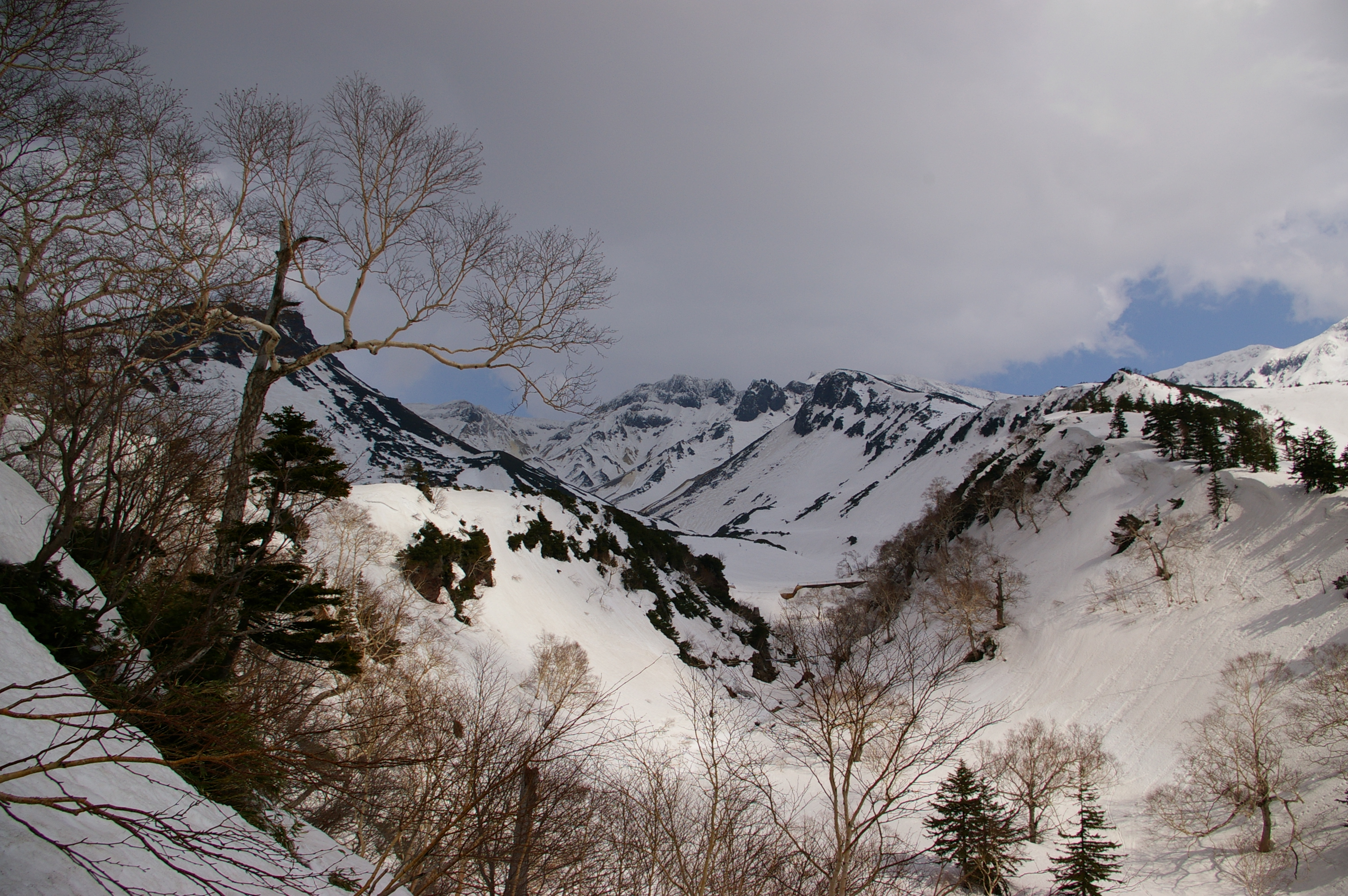
- The mountain during winter

Highest point
- Elevation: 1,920 m (6,300 ft)
- Listing: List of mountains and hills of Japan by height
- Coordinates: 43°24′17″N 142°40′18″E

Geography
- Location: Hokkaidō, Japan
- Parent range: Tokachi Volcanic Group
- Topo map(s): 25000:1 十勝岳, 50000:1 十勝岳

Geology
- Mountain type: volcanic
- Volcanic arc: Kuril arc

Mount Kamihorokamettoku (上ホロカメットク山, Kami-horokamettoku-san) is a mountain located in the Tokachi Volcanic Group, Hokkaidō, Japan.
