= Patagonian Batholith =

The Patagonian Batholith is a collective name for a three batholiths in western and southern Patagonia:

- North Patagonian Batholith
- South Patagonian Batholith
- Tierra del Fuego Batholith
