= Gakuden Station (Hokkaido) =

Railway station in Furano, Hokkaido, Japan

F44 Gakuden Station 学田駅
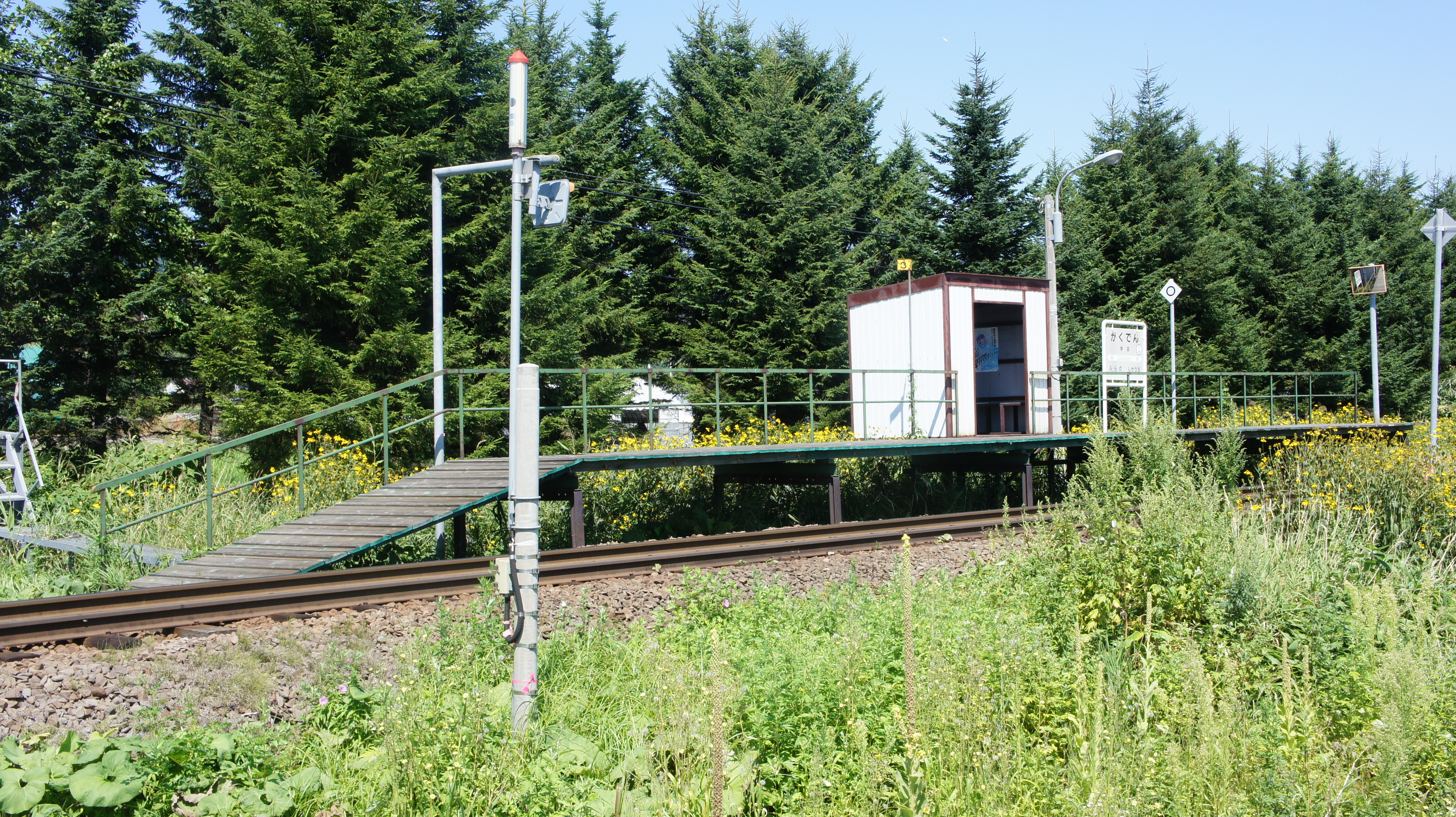
- Gakuden Station

General information
- Location: Nishi-Gakuden 2-ku, Furano; Hokkaido Prefecture; Japan
- Coordinates: 43°21′58″N 142°23′10″E
- System: JR Hokkaido commuter rail station
- Owner: JR Hokkaido
- Operator: JR Hokkaido
- Line: Furano Line
- Distance: 52.5 km (32.6 miles) from Asahikawa
- Platforms: 1 side platform
- Tracks: 1
- Bus stands: yes

Construction
- Structure type: At grade
- Accessible: None

Other information
- Station code: F44
- Website: Official website

History
- Opened: 25 March 1958; 68 years ago

Services
Preceding station	JR Hokkaido	Following station
Shikauchi F43 towards Asahikawa	Furano Line	Furano T30 Terminus
Location

Gakuden Station (学田駅, Gakuden-eki) is a train station located in Furano, Hokkaido, Japan. It is operated by the Hokkaido Railway Company. Only local trains stop. The station is assigned station number F44.

== Lines serviced ==
- Furano Line

== Surrounding Area ==
- Route 237
