= Tokachi Volcanic Group =

Volcanic group in Hokkaidō, Japan

- Tokachidake Volcano Group
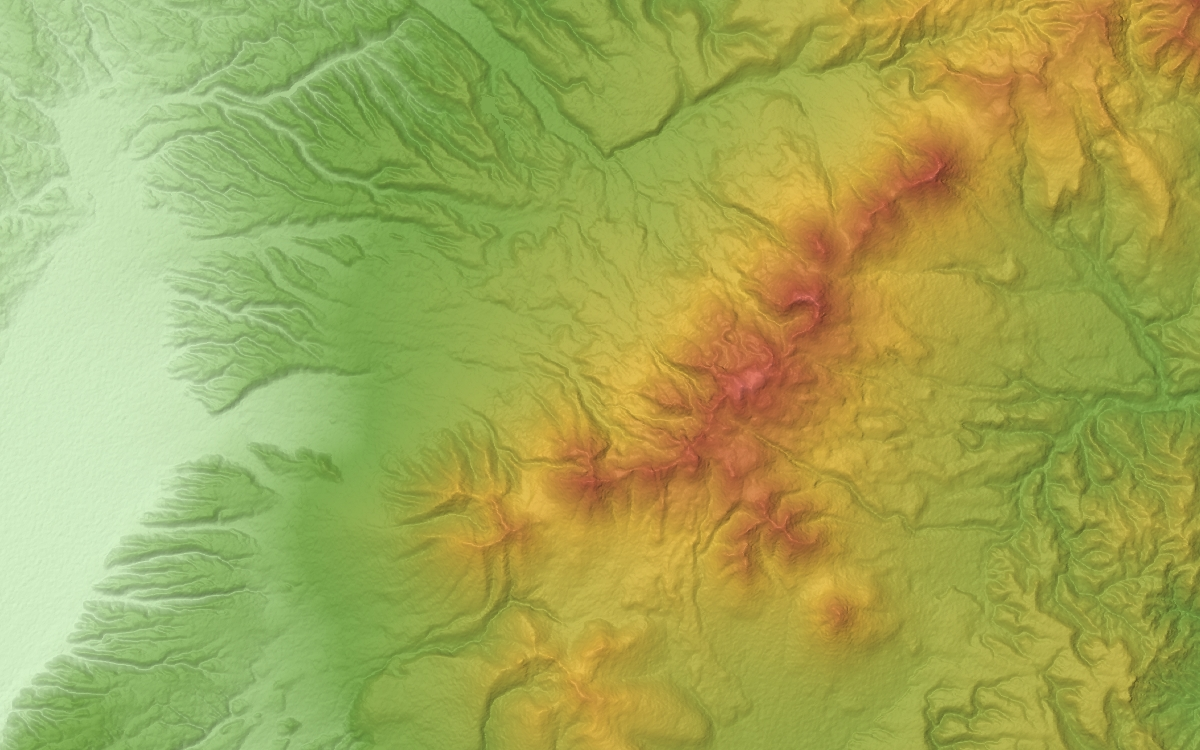
- Relief Map

Highest point
- Peak: Mount Tokachi (Daisetsuzan)
- Elevation: 2,077 m (6,814 ft)
- Coordinates: 43°25′04″N 142°41′11″E

Naming
- Native name: 十勝火山群 (Japanese); Tokachi-kazangun (Japanese)

Geography
- Country: Japan
- State: Hokkaidō
- Regions: Kamikawa Subprefecture; Tokachi subprefecture
- Districts: Kamikawa (Ishikari); Kamikawa (Tokachi); Sorachi
- Municipalities: Biei; Furano; Kamifurano; Minamifurano; Nakafurano; Shintoku
- Biome: alpine climate

Geology
- Orogeny: island arc
- Rock age: Quaternary
- Rock type: volcanic

Tokachi Volcanic Group (十勝火山群, Tokachi-kazangun) is a volcanic group of mainly stratovolcanoes arrayed along a southwest–northeast axis in Hokkaidō, Japan.

The volcanic group lies on the Kurile arc of the Pacific ring of fire, and consists of andesite, basalt, and dacite stratovolcanoes and lava domes. The group gets its name from the highest peak in the group, Mount Tokachi.

The most recent activity is centered on the northwest end.

== List of volcanoes ==
The following table lists the mountains in the volcanic group.

Name	Height	Type
Mount Tokachi (Daisetsuzan) (十勝岳, Tokachi-dake)	2,077 metres (6,814 ft)	Stratovolcano
Mount Biei (美瑛岳, Biei-dake)	2,052.3 metres (6,733.3 ft)	Stratovolcano
Mount Oputateshike (オプタテシケ山, Oputateshike-yama)	2,013 metres (6,604 ft)	
Mount Kamihorokamettoku (上ホロカメットク山, Kami-horokamettoku-san)	1,920 metres (6,300 ft)	Stratovolcano
Mount Furano (富良野岳, Furano-dake)	1,912.1 metres (6,273.3 ft)	Stratovolcano
Biei Fuji (美瑛富士, Biei-fuji)	1,888 metres (6,194 ft)	Stratovolcano
Mount Bebetsu (ベベツ岳, Bebetsu-dake)	1,860 metres (6,100 ft)	-

Other peaks include:

- Chuo-Kakokyu cone
- Ko-Tokachi-Dake stratovolcano
- Mae-Tokachi-Dake stratovolcano
- Maru-Yama cone
- Nokogiri-Dake stratovolcano
- Suribachi-Kakokyu cone
- Tairaga-Dake stratovolcano

== See also ==
- List of volcanoes in Japan
