= Daisetsuzan National Park =

National park in Hokkaidō, Japan

- 大雪山国立公園
- IUCN category II (national park)
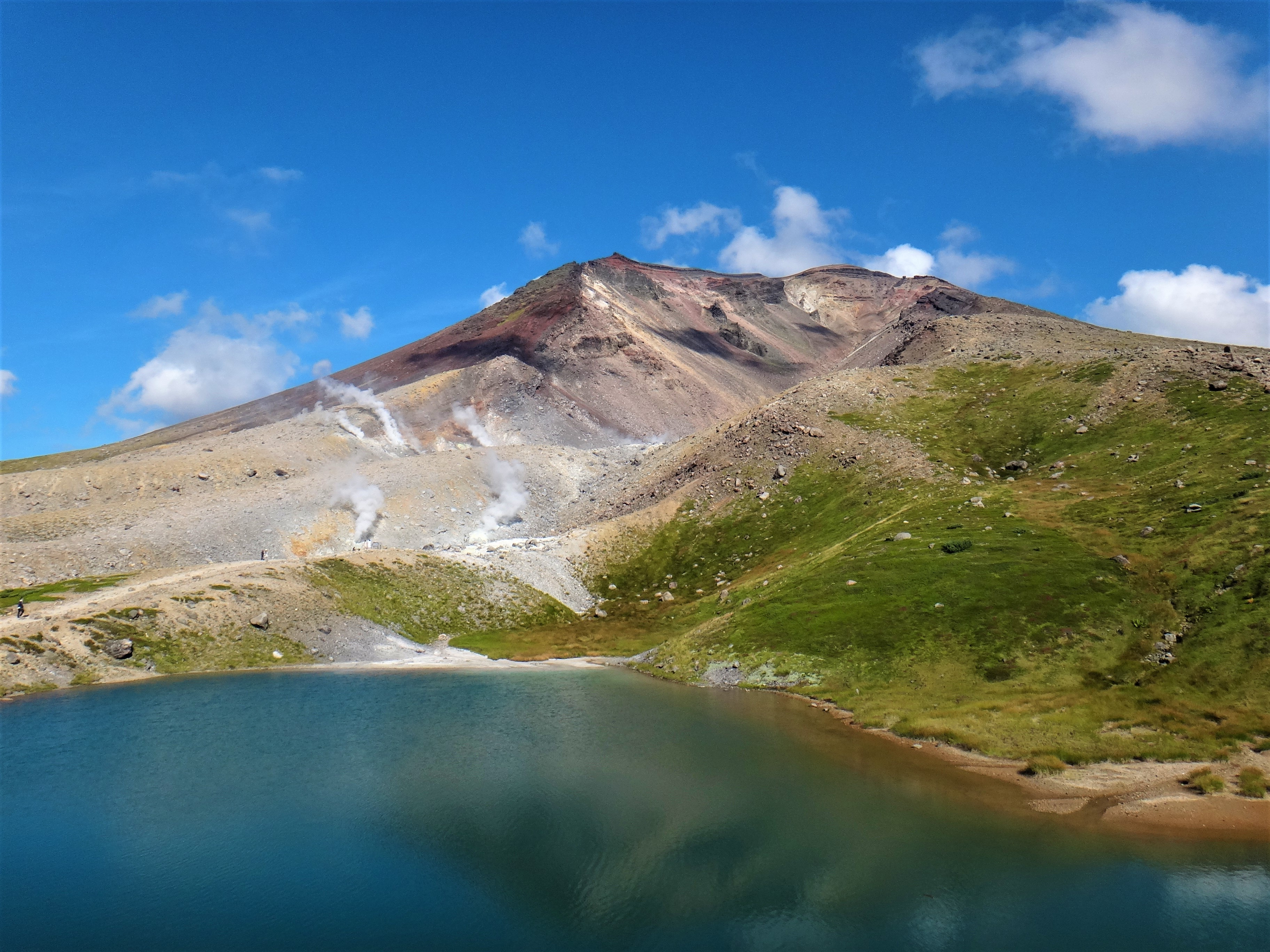
- Mount Asahi, Daisetsuzan National Park.

- Location within Hokkaido Location within Japan
- Location: Hokkaido, Japan
- Coordinates: 43.660278°N 142.858056°E
- Area: 2,267.64 km^{2} (875.54 sq mi)
- Established: December 4, 1934; 91 years ago
- Visitors: 6,000,000

Daisetsuzan National Park (大雪山国立公園, Daisetsuzan Kokuritsu Kōen), or Taisetsuzan is located in the mountainous center of the northern Japanese island of Hokkaido. At 2,267.64 square kilometres (875.54 mi^{2}), it is approximately the size of Kanagawa Prefecture. Until the establishment of Hidakasanmyaku-Erimo-Tokachi National Park in 2024, it was Japan's largest national park. Daisetsuzan, meaning "great snowy mountains", is an apt description of these peaks. There are 16 peaks over 2,000 metres (6,600 ft) in Daisetsuzan National Park, both with and without trails. The park offers some of Japan's most rugged scenery. Asahi-dake (2,290 metres (7,510 ft)), located in the north of the park, is the highest peak in Hokkaidō. Daisetsuzan National Park spans two subprefectures of Hokkaido, Kamikawa and Tokachi. Daisetsuzan National Park was established in 1934.

== Mountain groups ==
Daisetsuzan National Park consists of three volcanic mountain groups. The groups consist of stratovolcanoes piled on top of each other. As one vent becomes active, it builds a peak and then stops until a new vent appears. These groups are:

1. Daisetsuzan Volcanic Group — lies in the northern part of the park and includes Hokkaidō's tallest mountain, Mount Asahi.
2. Tokachi Volcanic Group — lies in the southwest of the park, north of the Yubari and Hidaka Mountains. It includes Mount Tokachi
3. Shikaribetsu Volcanic Group — lies in the eastern part of the park and includes Mount Ishikari. The Ishikari River (268 kilometres (167 mi)), which emerges from Mount Ishikari, is the third longest in Japan and the longest in Hokkaidō.

These volcanic groups lie around a central highlands dominated by Mount Tomuraushi. The park is also known for its alpine meadows and remote backcountry.

== Nature ==
Daisetsuzan National Park is famous for its wildlife, including several rare species. The park is notably home to a population of brown bears. The pika, a small mammal with short limbs, rounded ears, and no external tail, is also found in the park. The forests of Daisetsuzan National Park are dominated by the Picea jezoensis, the Jezo spruce, and the Abies sachalinensis, the Sakhalin fir. Of the 450 species of alpine plants found in Hokkaidō, half are found in Daisetsuzan National Park.

== Onsen ==
Daisetsuzan National Park also includes the onsen hot spring resorts of Asahidake Onsen, Fukiage Onsen, Sōunkyō Onsen and Tenninkyo Onsen.

== See also ==
- List of national parks of Japan
- List of Special Places of Scenic Beauty, Special Historic Sites and Special Natural Monuments
- SOS incident
