= Nakafurano =

Nakafurano 中富良野町
- Town
- Flag Seal

- Location of Nakafurano in Hokkaido (Kamikawa Subprefecture)

- Location in Japan
- Coordinates: 43°24′N 142°26′E
- Country: Japan
- Region: Hokkaido
- Prefecture: Hokkaido (Kamikawa Subprefecture)
- District: Sorachi

Area
  - Total: 108.70 km^{2} (41.97 sq mi)

Population (April 28, 2017)
  - Total: 5,086
  - Density: 46.79/km^{2} (121.2/sq mi)
- Time zone: UTC+09:00 (JST)
- Website: www.town.nakafurano.lg.jp

Nakafurano (中富良野町, Nakafurano-chō) is a town located in Kamikawa Subprefecture, Hokkaido, Japan.

As of April 28, 2017, the town has an estimated population of 5,086 and a density of 47 persons per km^{2}. The total area is 108.70 km^{2}.

== Lavender farm ==
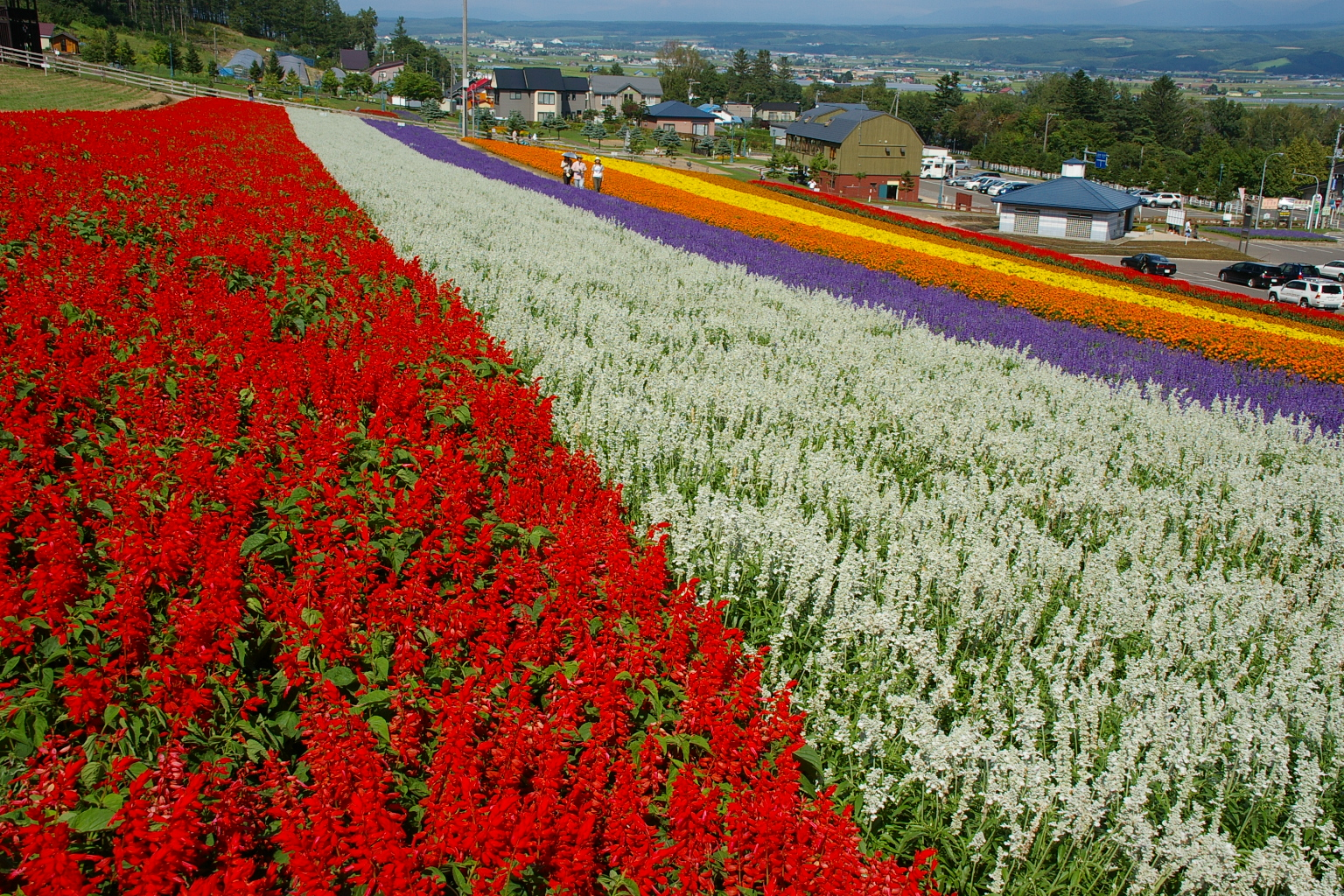
Lavender field in Nakafurano

Furano is famous for its numerous fields of lavender.

== Culture ==
=== Mascot ===
Lavender Fairy, the town's mascot

Nakafurano's mascot is the gentle, laid-back, unfussy and clean Lavender Fairy (ラベンダーの妖精, Rabendā no Yōsei) or Lavender-chan (ラベンダーちゃん, Rabendā-chan). She is a gardener who lives in the Furano Lavender Fields (which is also her workplace). She loves to travel to gardens around the world and likes purple and green flowers. Her clothes were made from recycled melon skins and her hat and apron is scented from lavender. She is unveiled on 7 July 1995.
