= Mount Pankenūshi =

Mountain in Hokkaido, Japan

- パンケヌーシ岳

Highest point
- Elevation: 1,746 m (5,728 ft)
- Prominence: 116 m (381 ft)
- Parent peak: Mount Memuro
- Listing: List of mountains and hills of Japan by height
- Coordinates: 42°52′20″N 142°46′14″E

Geography
- Location: Hokkaidō, Japan
- Parent range: Hidaka Mountains
- Topo map(s): Geographical Survey Institute (国土地理院, Kokudochiriin) 25000:1 芽室岳

Geology
- Mountain type: Fold (geology)

Climbing
- Easiest route: Memuro River North Ridge Route

Mount Pankenūshi (パンケヌーシ岳, Pankenūshi-dake) or Mount Memuro Western Peak (芽室岳西峰, Memuro-dake Sei-hō) is located in the Hidaka Mountains, Hokkaidō, Japan. This mountain is the western summit of Mount Memuro.
