= Horohoro =

Horohoro may refer to:

- Horohoro (anime character), a fictional character in the anime and manga series Shaman King
- Horohoro, New Zealand, a farming district 15 kilometres (9.3 mi) south-west of Rotorua
  - Horohoro Cliffs and peak, the western boundary of Kapenga Caldera, that overlook the district
- Mount Horohoro, a mountain in Hokkaidō, Japan
