= Mount Denjō =

Mountain in Nagano Prefecture, Japan

- 殿城山
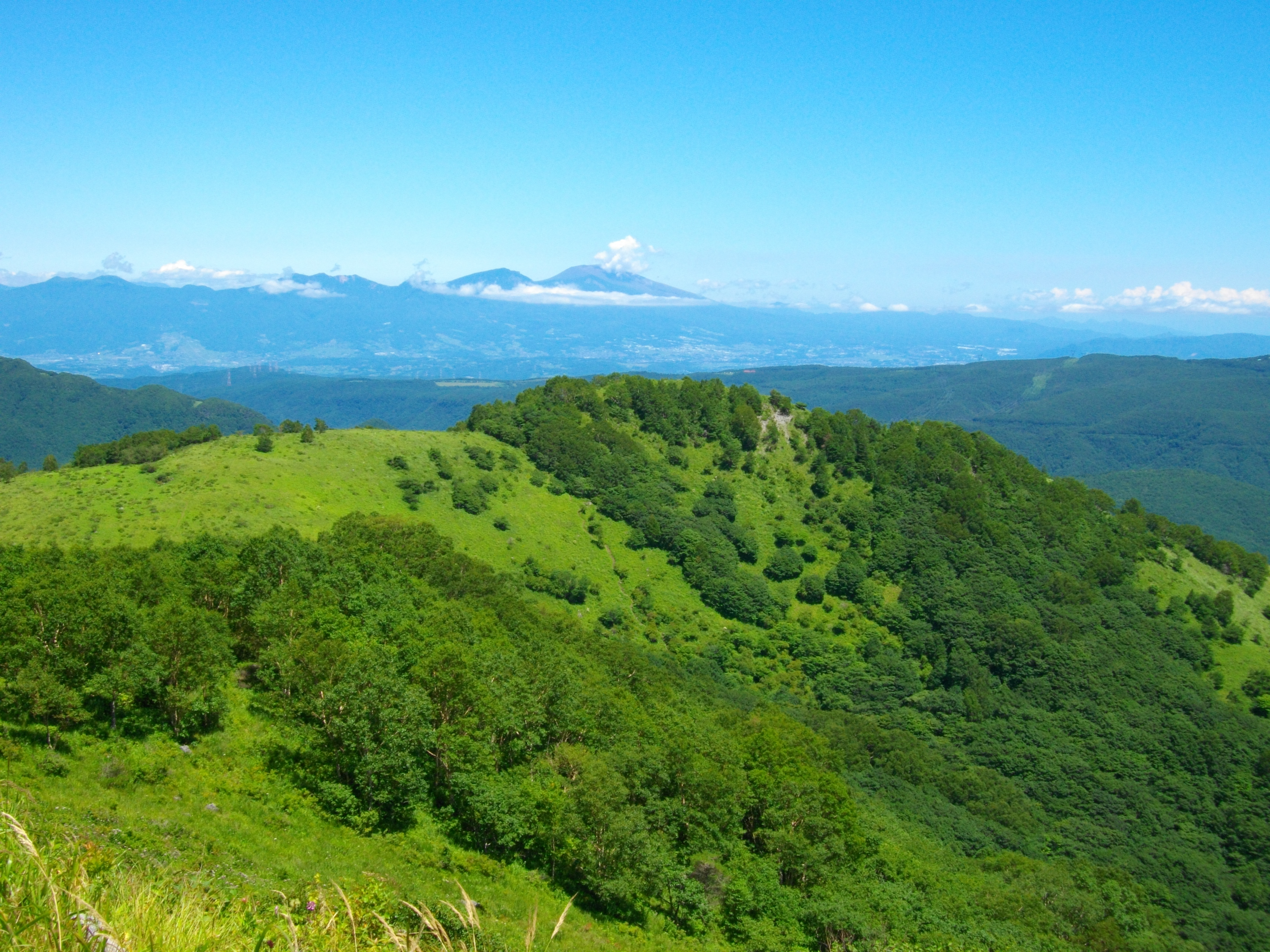
- Seen from the southwest. Mount Asama in the background.

Highest point
- Elevation: 1,800 m (5,900 ft)
- Listing: List of mountains and hills of Japan by height
- Coordinates: 36°6′52″N 138°12′19″E

Naming
- Language of name: Japanese
- Pronunciation: [dendʑoːsaɴ]

Geography
- Location: Nagawa, Nagano, Japan
- Parent range: Kirigamine

Mount Denjō (殿城山, Denjō-san) is a 1,800 m (5,906 ft) mountain of Chushin Highland, located in Nagawa, Nagano. This mountain is a part of the Yatsugatake-Chūshin Kōgen Quasi-National Park.

== Leisure ==
On Mount Denjō, there is Echo Valley Ski Resort.

== Route ==
There are several routes to the top of the mountain. The easiest route is to climb from Himekidaira. Other routes are from Mount Kuruma or Mount Ōsasa.

== Access ==
- Himekidaira-Chuo Bus Stop of JR Kanto Bus

== Gallery ==
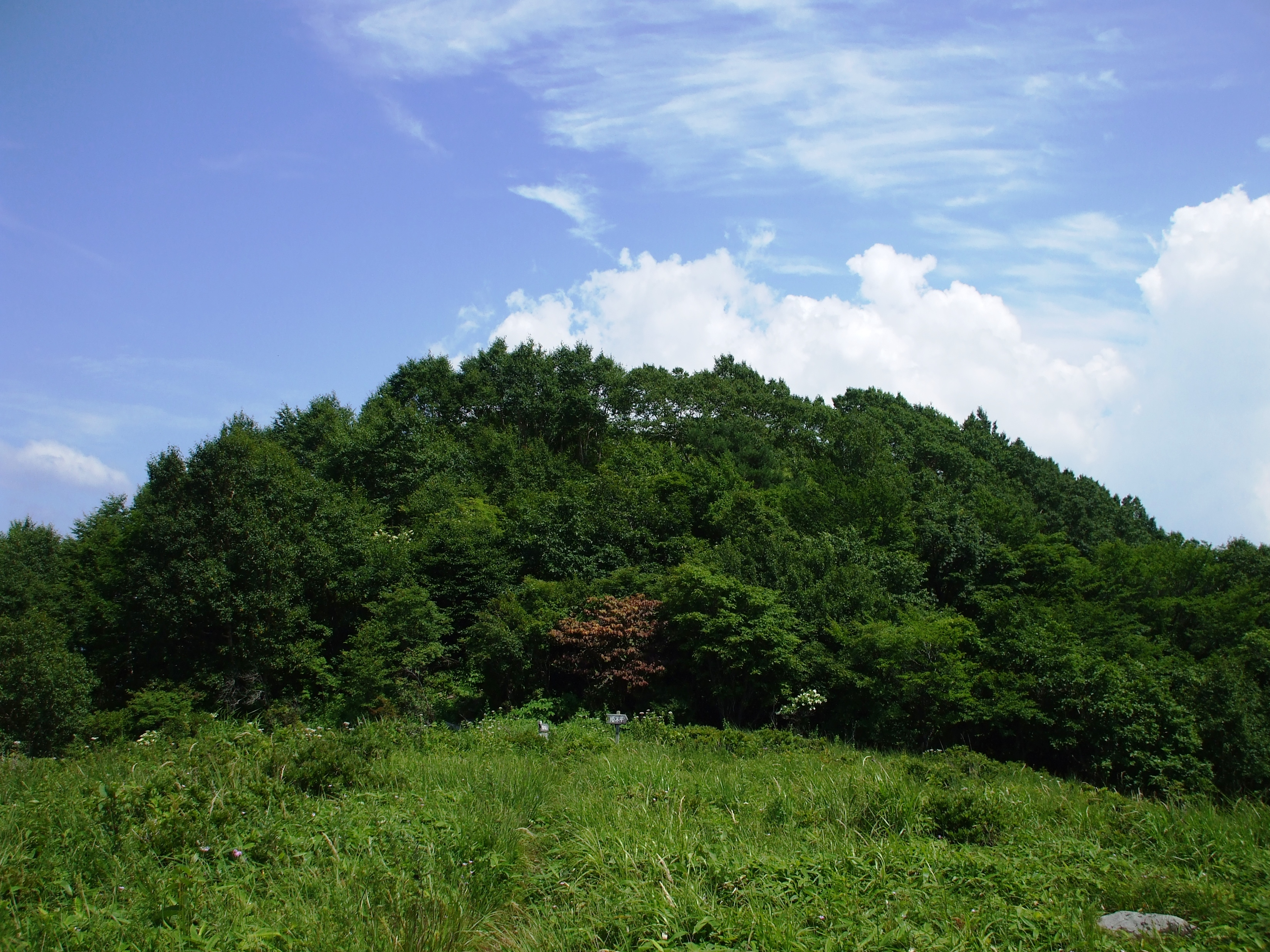
Mount Denjō from near the top

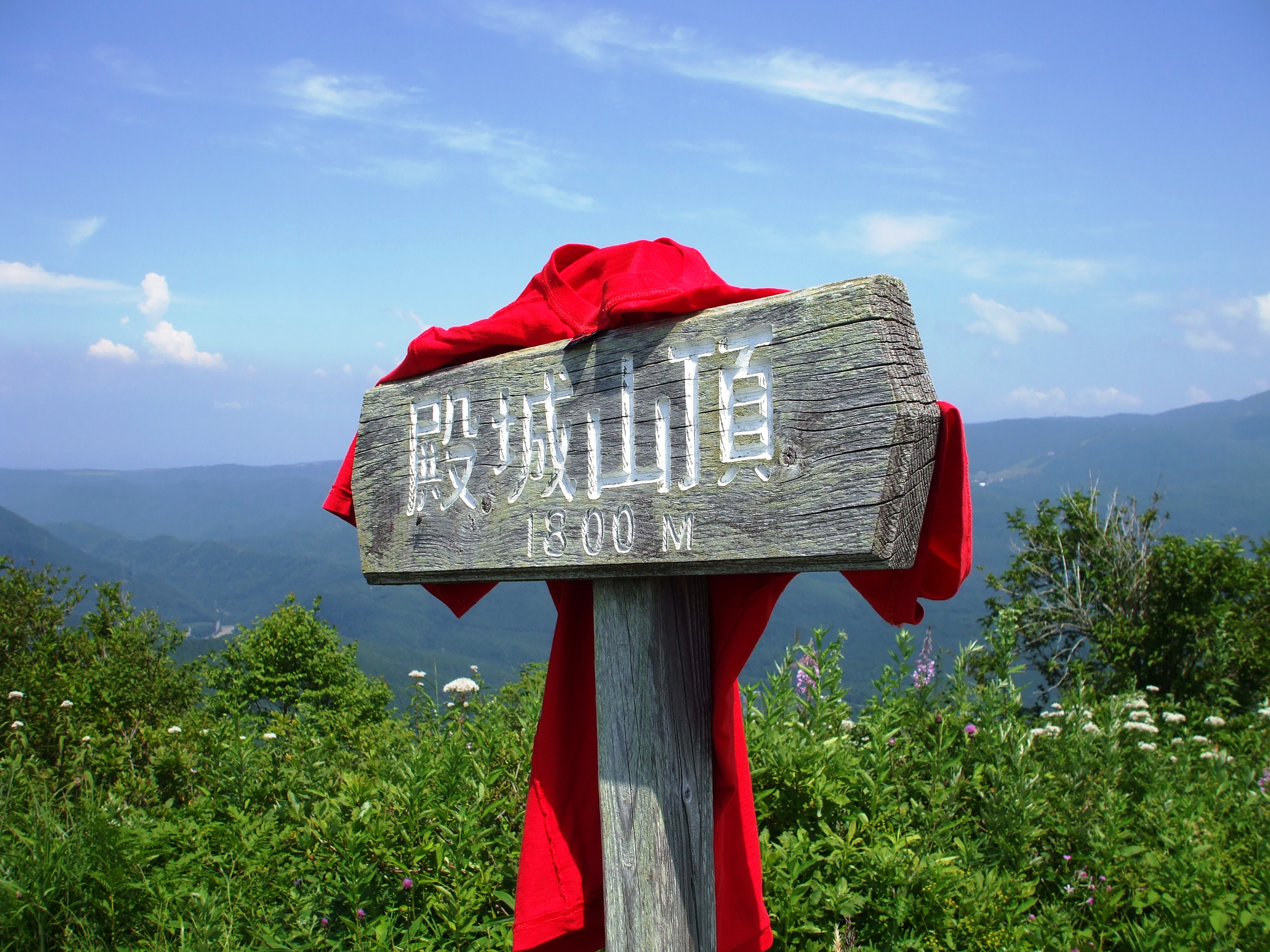
At the top of Mount Denjō

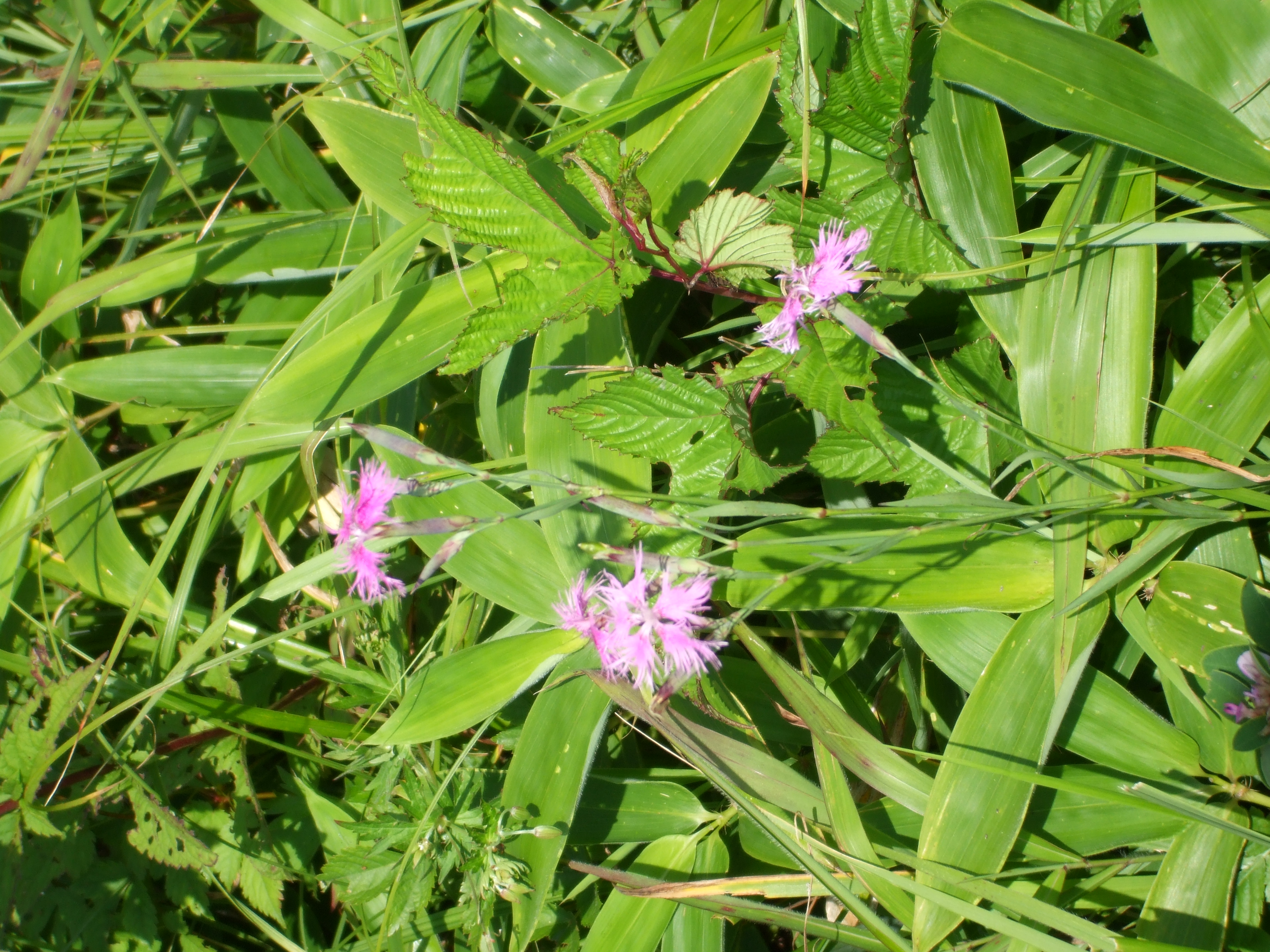
Kawara-Nadeshiko at the top of Mount Denjō

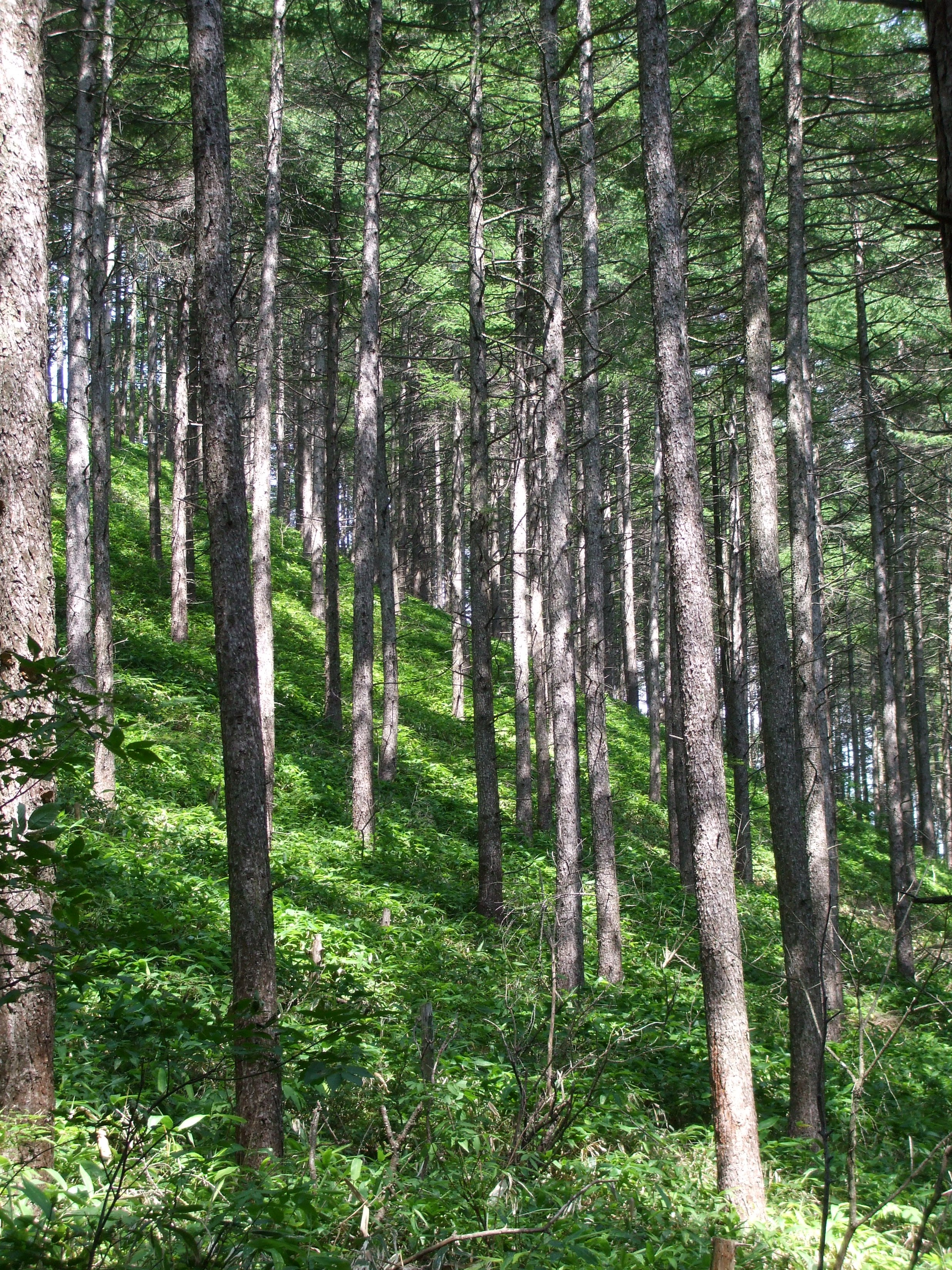
A Forest of Mount Denjō

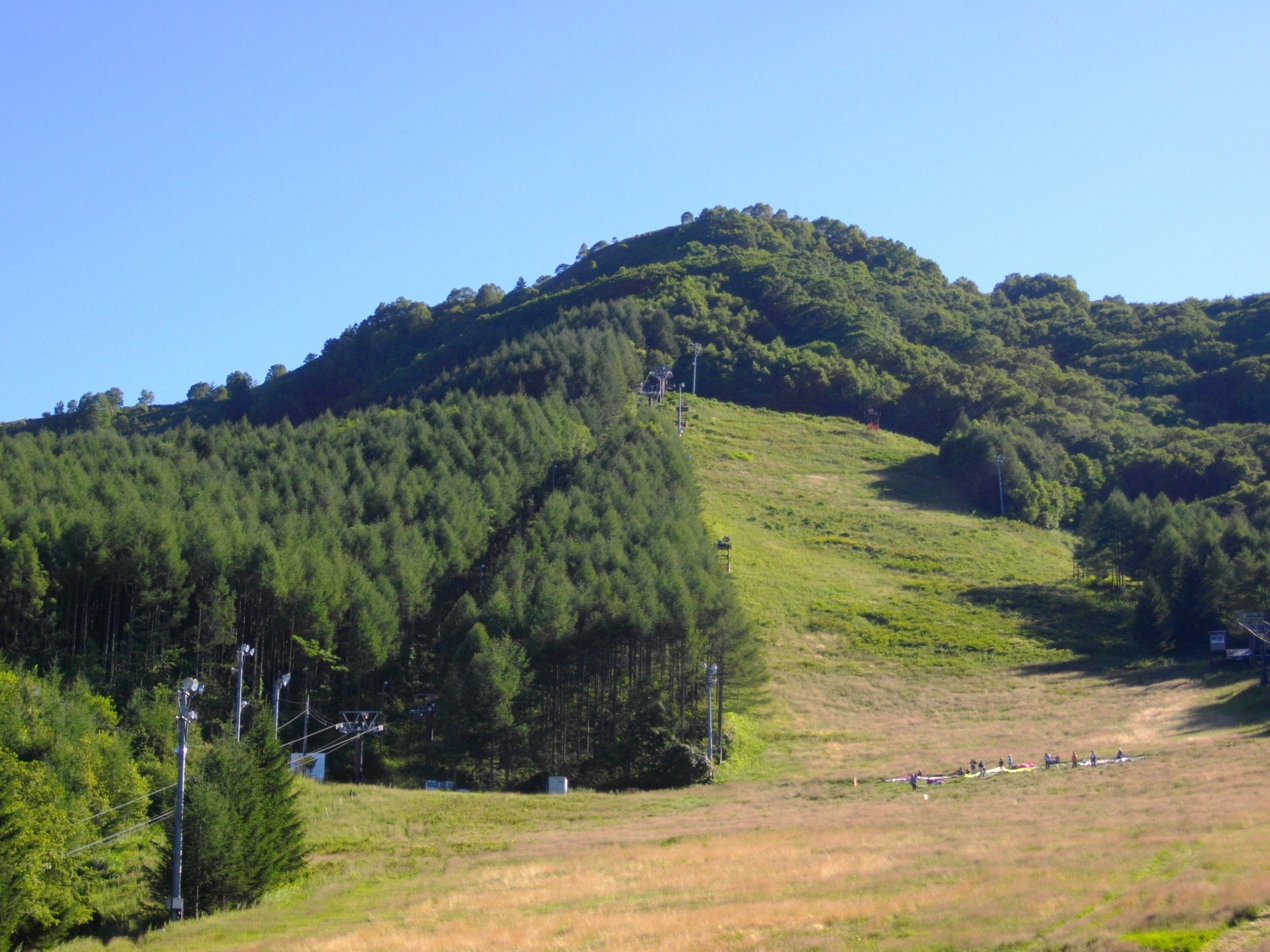
Mount Denjō from Echo Valley Ski Resort

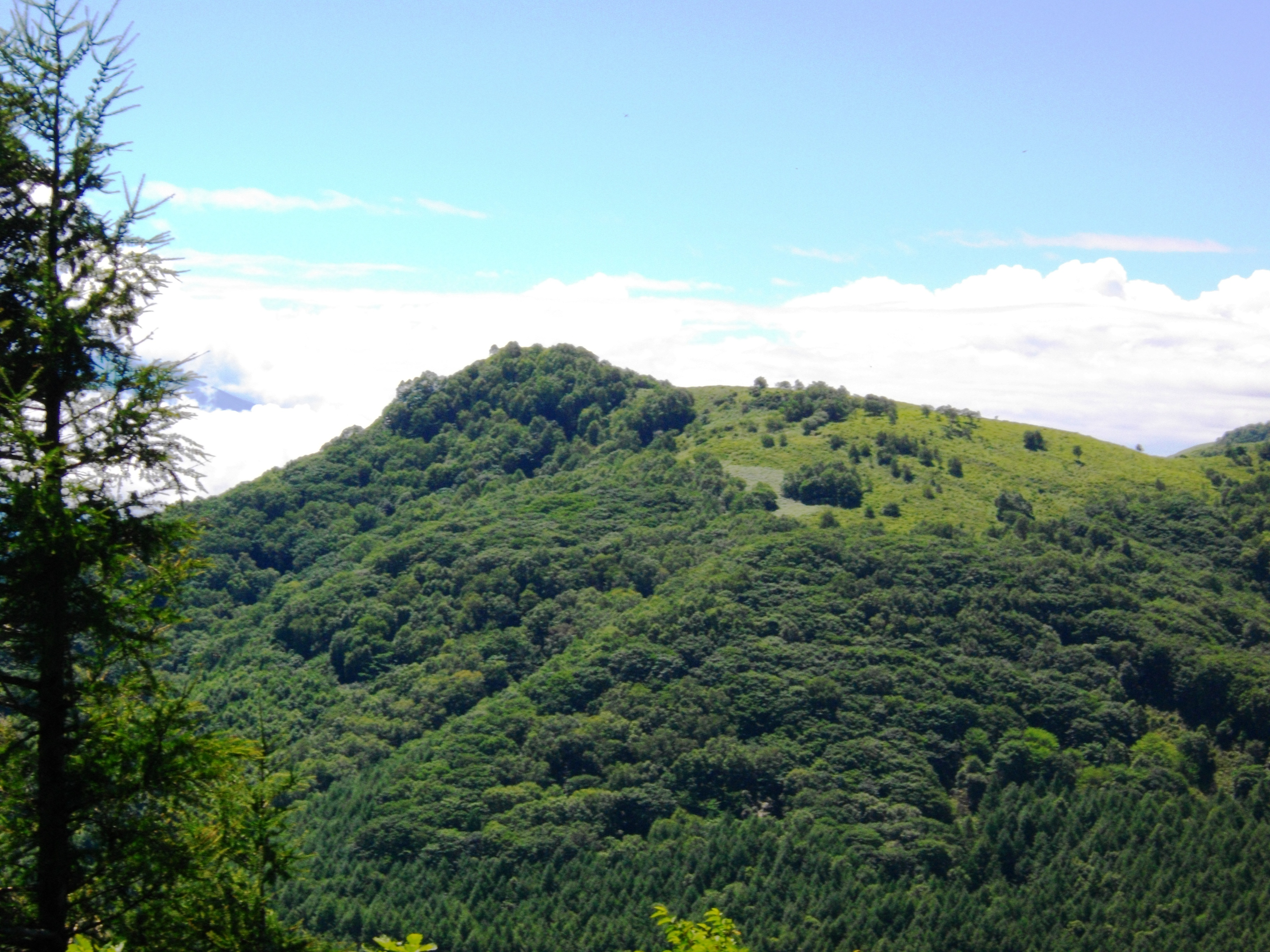
Mount Denjō from Mount Ōsasa
