= Monbetsu =

Monbetsu is the Japanese name of several places in Hokkaidō, Japan. It originates from the Ainu word mo-pet, meaning quiet river.

- In Okhotsk Subprefecture:
  - Monbetsu, Hokkaidō (紋別市), a city
  - Monbetsu District, Hokkaidō (紋別郡), a district
- Monbetsu, Hokkaidō (Hidaka) (門別町), a former town in Hidaka Subprefecture now part of the town Hidaka, Hokkaidō

== See also ==
Mountains in Hokkaidō:

- Mount Monbetsu (紋別岳), a mountain on the shore of Lake Shikotsu in Chitose City
- Mount Date Monbetsu (伊達紋別岳), also referred to as Mount Monbetsu, a mountain, in Date City
