= List of mountains and hills of Japan by height =

The following is a list of the mountains and hills of Japan, ordered by height.

== Mountains over 1000 meters ==
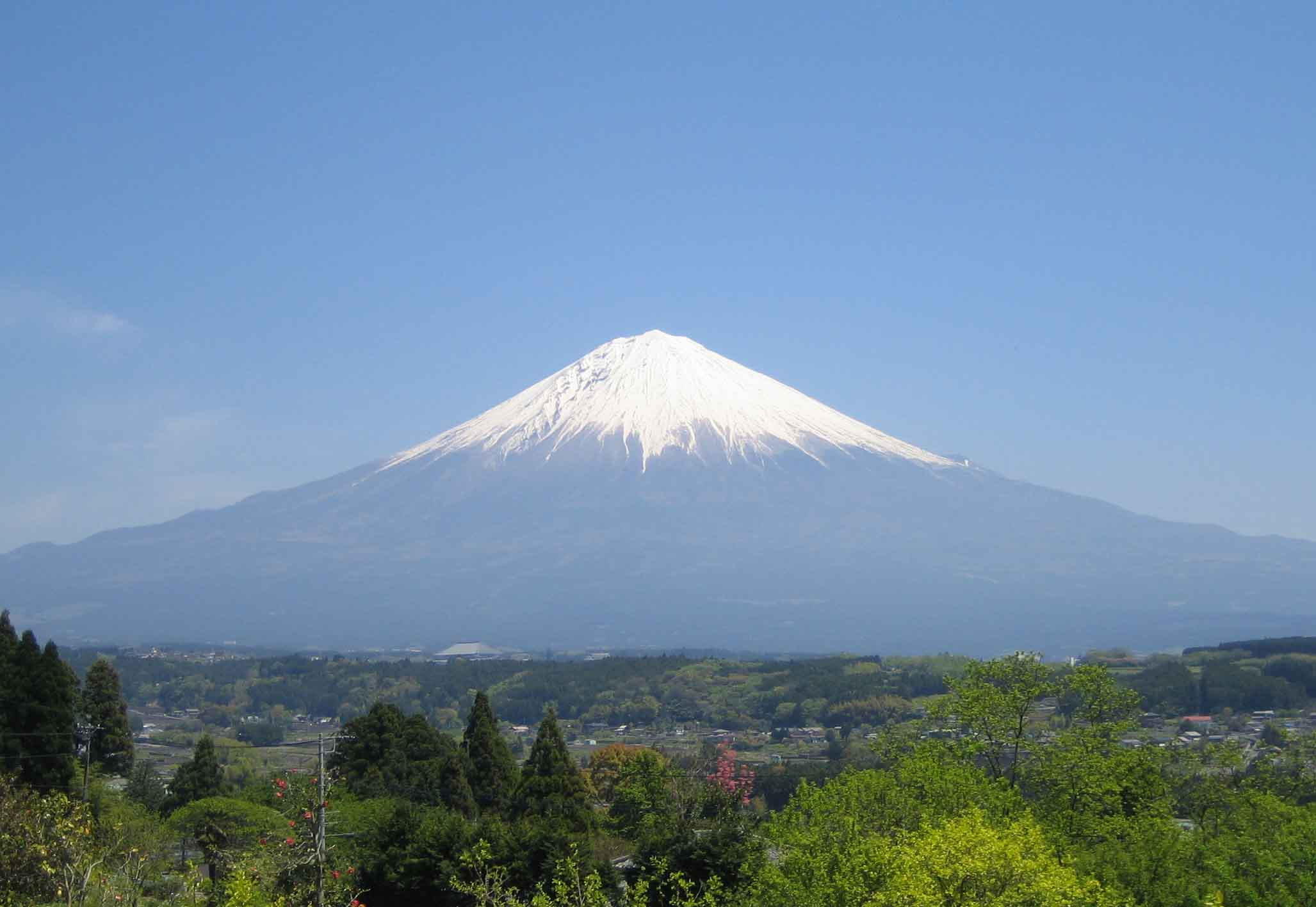
Mount Fuji, highest in Japan

Mountain	Meters	Feet	Prefecture
Mount Fuji	3,776	12,388	Shizuoka / Yamanashi
Mount Kita	3,193	10,476	Yamanashi
Mount Okuhotaka (Hotakadake)	3,190	10,470	Gifu / Nagano
Mount Aino	3,190	10,470	Shizuoka / Yamanashi
Mount Yari	3,180	10,430	Gifu / Nagano
Mount Warusawa	3,141	10,305	Shizuoka
Mount Akaishi	3,120	10,240	Nagano / Shizuoka
Mount Karasawa	3,110	10,200	Gifu / Nagano
Mount Kitahotaka	3,106	10,190	Gifu / Nagano
Mount Ōbami	3,101	10,174	Gifu / Nagano
Mount Maehotaka	3,090	10,140	Nagano
Mount Naka	3,084	10,118	Gifu / Nagano
Mount Arakawa-Naka	3,084	10,118	Shizuoka
Mount Ontake	3,067	10,062	Gifu / Nagano
Mount Nishinōtori	3,051	10,010	Shizuoka / Yamanashi
Mount Shiomi	3,047	9,997	Nagano / Shizuoka
Mount Senjō	3,032.56	9,949.3	Nagano / Yamanashi
Mount Norikura	3,026	9,928	Gifu / Nagano
Mount Tate	3,015	9,892	Toyama
Mount Hijiri	3,013	9,885	Nagano / Shizuoka
Mount Tsurugi (Tsurugi-dake)	2,999	9,839	Toyama
Mount Suisho (Suisho-dake)	2,986	9,797	Toyama
Mount Kaikoma	2,967	9,734	Nagano / Yamanashi
Mount Kisokoma	2,956	9,698	Nagano
Mount Shirouma	2,932	9,619	Nagano / Toyama
Mount Otensho	2,922	9,587	Nagano
Mount Yakushi	2,926	9,600	Toyama
Mount Washiba	2,924	9,593	Nagano / Toyama
Mount Aka (Yatsugatake)	2,899	9,511	Nagano / Yamanashi
Mount Kasa	2,897	9,505	Gifu
Mount Kashimayari	2,889	9,478	Toyama/Nagano
Mount Utsugi	2,863.7	9,395	Nagano
Mount Jōnen	2,857	9,373	Nagano
Mount Sannosawa	2,846.5	9,339	Nagano
Mount Minamikoma	2,841	9,321	Nagano
Mount Kannon (Hōō-zan)	2,840	9,320	Yamanashi
Mount Kurobegorō	2,839.6	9,316	Gifu / Toyama
Mount Yoko (Southern Yatsugatake)	2,829	9,281	Nagano / Yamanashi
Mount Goryu	2,814	9,232	Nagano / Toyama
Mount Akanagi	2,798	9,180	Nagano
Mount Yakushi (Hōō-zan)	2,780	9,120	Yamanashi
Mount Jizō (Hōō-zan)	2,764	9,068	Yamanashi
Mount Tsubakuro	2,763	9,065	Nagano
Mount Iō (Yatsugatake)	2,760	9,060	Nagano
Mount Haku	2,702.2	8,865	Gifu / Ishikawa
Mount Hōei	2,693	8,835	Shizuoka
Mount Nokogiri (Akaishi)	2,685	8,809	Nagano/Yamanashi
Mount Chō	2,677	8,783	Nagano
Mount Tengu	2,646	8,681	Nagano
Mount Neishi	2,603	8,540	Nagano
Mount Kinpu	2,599	8,527	Nagano/Yamanashi
Mount Yumiori	2,592	8,504	Gifu
Mount Tekari	2,591.1	8,501	Shizuoka / Nagano
Mount Nikko-Shirane	2,578	8,458	Gunma / Tochigi
Mount Asama	2,568	8,425	Gunma / Nagano
Mount Tateshina	2,533	8,310	Nagano
Mount Nantai	2,484	8,150	Tochigi
Mount Sanpō	2,483	8,146	Saitama
Mount Yoko (Northern Yatsugatake)	2,480	8,140	Nagano
Mount Hiuchi	2,462	8,077	Niigata
Mount Yake	2,455	8,054	Gifu / Nagano
Mount Myōkō	2,454	8,051	Niigata
Mount Hachimori	2,446	8,025	Nagano
Mount Bessan	2,399	7,871	Ishikawa / Gifu
Mount Nishi (Yatsugatake)	2,398	7,867	Nagano
Mount Hiuchigatake	2,356	7,730	Fukushima
Mount Azumaya	2,354	7,723	Gunma / Nagano
Mount Asahi	2,290	7,510	Hokkaidō
Mount Hokuchin	2,244	7,362	Hokkaidō
Mount Chōkai	2,236	7,336	Akita / Yamagata
Mount Hakuun	2,230.0	7,316.3	Hokkaidō
Mount Kuma	2,210	7,250	Hokkaidō
Mount Pippu	2,197	7,208	Hokkaidō
Mount Ena	2,191	7,188	Nagano / Gifu
Mount Mamiya	2,185	7,169	Hokkaidō
Mount Kusatsu-Shirane	2,171	7,123	Gunma
Mount Koizumi	2,158	7,080	Hokkaidō
Mount Nyū	2,151.9	7,060	Nagano
Mount Hokkai	2,149	7,051	Hokkaidō
Mount Naeba	2,145.3	7,038	Niigata / Nagano
Mount Naeba	2,144	7,034	Gunma / Tochigi
Mount Nokogiri (Hokkaidō)	2,142	7,028	Hokkaidō
Mount Tomuraushi	2,141.0	7,024.3	Hokkaidō
Mount Matsuda	2,136	7,008	Hokkaidō
Mount Sannomine	2,128	6,982	Ishikawa / Gifu
Mount Dainichi	2,128	6,982	Niigata
Mount Ryōun	2,125	6,972	Hokkaidō
Mount Naka	2,113	6,932	Hokkaidō
Mount Ogura	2,112	6,929	Hokkaidō
Mount Nyū	2,112	6,929	Nagano
Mount Iide	2,105	6,906	Fukushima
Mount Sannomine	2,095	6,873	Fukui / Gifu
Mount Nakanodake	2,085	6,841	Niigata
Mount Aka (Daisetsuzan)	2,078.5	6,819	Hokkaidō
Mount Tokachi	2,077	6,814	Hokkaidō
Mount Eboshi	2,072	6,798	Hokkaidō
Mount Daibosatsu	2,057	6,749	Yamanashi
Mount Kurohime	2,053	6,736	Nagano
Mount Poroshiri	2,052.8	6,735	Hokkaidō
Mount Biei	2,052.3	6,733	Hokkaidō
Mount Iwate	2,038	6,686	Iwate
Mount Goshiki	2,038	6,686	Hokkaidō
Mount Kitamata	2,024	6,640	Niigata/ Yamagata/ Fukushima
Mount Midori	2,019.9	6,627	Hokkaidō
Mount Kumotori	2,017	6,617	Tokyo / Saitama / Yamanashi
Mount Eboshi	2,017	6,617	Niigata/ Yamagata/ Fukushima
Mount Nipesotsu	2,012.9	6,604	Hokkaidō
Mount Oputateshike	2,012.5	6,603	Hokkaidō
Mount Onishi	2,012	6,601	Niigata/ Yamagata/ Fukushima
Uonuma-Komagatake	2,002.7	6,571	Niigata
Mount Hayachine	1,913.6	6,278	Iwate
Mount Kuro	1,984.3	6,510	Hokkaidō
Mount Gassan	1,984	6,509	Yamagata
Mount Ishizuchi	1,982	6,503	Ehime
Mount Kamuiekuuchikaushi	1,979.4	6,494	Hokkaidō
Mount Tanigawa	1,977	6,486	Niigata / Gunma
Mount Ishikari	1,967	6,453	Hokkaidō
Mount Kenashi	1,964	6,444	Shizuoka / Yamanashi
Mount Amakazari	1,963	6,440	Nagano / Niigata
Mount Chūbetsu	1,962.8	6,440	Hokkaidō
Mount Tottabetsu	1,959	6,427	Hokkaidō
Mount Tsurugi	1,955	6,414	Tokushima
Mount Keigetsu	1,938	6,358	Hokkaidō
Mount Miyanoura	1,936	6,352	Kagoshima
Mount Otofuke	1,932.0	6,338.6	Hokkaidō
Mount Kirigamine	1,925	6,316	Nagano
Mount Kamihorokamettoku	1,920	6,300	Hokkaidō
Mount Iizuna	1,917	6,289	Nagano
Mount Nasu	1,916.9	6,289	Tochigi / Fukushima
Mount Pipairo	1,916.5	6,288	Hokkaidō
Mount Hakkyō	1,915	6,283	Nara
Mount Furano	1,912	6,273	Hokkaidō
Mount Kitatottabetsu	1,912	6,273	Hokkaidō
Mount Esaoman-Tottabetsu	1,902	6,240	Hokkaidō
Mount Yōtei	1,898	6,227	Hokkaidō
Mount Satsunai	1,895.5	6,219	Hokkaidō
Mount Miune	1,893	6,211	Kochi
Biei Fuji	1,888	6,194	Hokkaidō
Mount Chiroro	1,879.9	6,168	Hokkaidō
Mount Bebetsu	1,860	6,100	Hokkaidō
Mount Tokachiporoshiri	1,846.0	6,056.4	Hokkaidō
1839 Metre Summit	1,842	6,043	Hokkaidō
Mount Oizuru	1,841.4	6,041	Ishikawa / Gifu / Toyama
Mount Zaō	1,841	6,040	Miyagi / Yamagata
Mount Upepesanke	1,836	6,024	Hokkaidō
Mount Akagi	1,828	5,997	Gunma
Mount Bandai	1,819	5,968	Fukushima
Mount Nukabira	1,807.9	5,931	Hokkaidō
Mount Ōsasa	1,807.3	5,929	Nagano
Mount Denjō	1,800	5,900	Nagano
Mount Shakka	1,799.6	5,904	Nara
Mount Namewakka	1,799.1	5,903	Hokkaidō
Mount Yaoromappu	1,794.3	5,887	Hokkaidō
Mount Fushimi	1,792	5,879	Hokkaidō
Mount Kujū	1,791	5,876	Ōita
Mount Tanemaki	1,791	5,876	Niigata/Yamagata/Fukushima
Mount Chōkai (East Slope)	1,757	5,764	Akita
Mount Kamui (Niikappu-Kasai)	1,756.1	5,761	Hokkaidō
Mount Sobo	1,756	5,761	Miyazaki
Mount Yuniishikari	1,756	5,761	Hokkaidō
Mount Memuro	1,753.7	5,754	Hokkaidō
Mount Idonmappu	1,752	5,748	Hokkaidō
Mount Penkenūshi	1,750.1	5,742	Hokkaidō
Mount Pankenūshi	1,746	5,728	Hokkaidō
Mount Rubeshibe	1,740.0	5,708.7	Hokkaidō
Kunimi-dake	1,739	5,705	Kumamoto
Mount Petegari	1,736.2	5,696	Hokkaidō
Mount Oshiki	1,731.3	5,680	Hokkaidō
Daisen	1,729	5,673	Tottori
Mount Rubetsune	1,727.3	5,667	Hokkaidō
Mount Ashibetsu	1,726.1	5,663	Hokkaidō
Mount Koikakushusatsunai	1,721	5,646	Hokkaidō
Mount Rishiri	1,721	5,646	Hokkaidō
Mount Dainichi	1,709	5,607	Gifu
Mount Azuma	1,705	5,594	Fukushima
Mount Karakuni	1,700	5,600	Miyazaki / Kagoshima
Mount Ōdaigahara	1,695	5,561	Mie
Mount Maru	1,692.1	5,552	Hokkaidō
Mount Hiru	1,672.7	5,488	Kanagawa
Mount Yūbari	1,667.7	5,471	Hokkaidō
Mount Mikuni	1,664	5,459	Niigata/Yamagata/Fukushima
Mount Rausu	1,661	5,449	Hokkaidō
Mount Ōkueyama	1,643	5,390	Kyushu
Pirika Nupuri	1,630.8	5,350	Hokkaidō
Mount Shikashinai	1,627.9	5,341	Hokkaidō
Mount Shibichari	1,626.9	5,338	Hokkaidō
Mount Iwaki	1,625.7	5,334	Aomori
Mount Soematsu	1,625	5,331	Hokkaidō
Mount Nōgōhaku	1,617.3	5,306	Gifu / Fukui
Mount Kamui (Urakawa-Hiroo)	1,600.5	5,251	Hokkaidō
Mount Aso	1,592	5,223	Kumamoto
Mount Piratokomi	1,587.7	5,209	Hokkaidō
Mount Ōdake (Hakkōda Mountains)	1,585	5,200	Aomori
Mount Yufu	1,583.3	5,195	Ōita
Mount Tanzawa	1,567.1	5,141	Kanagawa
Mount Kasatori	1,562	5,125	Ehime
Mount Iō (Shiretoko)	1,562.0	5,124.7	Hokkaidō
Mount Teshio	1,557.6	5,110	Hokkaidō
Mount Shari	1,547	5,075	Hokkaidō
Mount Mikuni (Ishikari)	1,541.4	5,057	Hokkaidō
Mount Pekerebetsu	1,532.0	5,026.2	Hokkaidō
Mount Kurai	1,529.2	5,017	Gifu
Mount Arashima	1,523	4,997	Fukui
Mount Nakano	1,519	4,984	Hokkaidō
Mount Hyōno	1,510	4,950	Hyōgo
Mount Inamura	1,506	4,941	Kochi
Mount Numanohara	1,505.6	4,940	Hokkaidō
Mount Ashitaka	1,504	4,934	Shizuoka
Mount Minami	1,500	4,900	Hokkaido
Mount Meakan	1,499	4,918	Hokkaidō
Mount Iwanai	1,497.7	4,914	Hokkaidō
Mount Toyoni	1,493	4,898	Hokkaidō
Mount Shunbetsu	1,491.8	4,894	Hokkaidō
Mount Shokanbetsu	1,491.6	4,894	Hokkaidō
Mount Tō	1,490.9	4,891	Kanagawa
Mount Unzen	1,486	4,875	Nagasaki
Mount Tomuraushi (Hidaka)	1,476.7	4,845	Hokkaidō
Mount Rakko	1,471.9	4,829	Hokkaidō
Mount Tokachi (Hidaka)	1,457.2	4,781	Hokkaidō
Mount Moriyoshi	1,454	4,770	Akita
Mount Hachimori (Yūbari)	1,453	4,767	Hokkaidō
Mount Haruna	1,449	4,754	Gunma
Mount Chitokaniushi	1,445.6	4,743	Hokkaidō
Mount Ōtenjō	1,438.7	4,720	Nara
Mount Futamata	1,437.9	4,718	Hokkaidō
Mount Myōjin	1,432	4,698	Nara / Mie
Mount Saru	1,422.0	4,665.4	Hokkaidō
Shinmoedake	1,420.8	4,661	Kagoshima / Miyazaki
Mount Hinokizuka Okumine	1,420	4,660	Mie
Mount Unabetsu	1,419.3	4,656	Hokkaidō
Mount Kunimi (Daikō)	1,418.7	4,655	Mie / Nara
Mount Chausu	1,415	4,642	Aichi
Mount Kyusan	1,411.7	4,632	Hokkaidō
Mount Azami	1,406	4,613	Nara
Mount Amagi	1,406	4,613	Shizuoka
Mount Ponyaoromappu	1,405.6	4,612	Hokkaidō
Mount Kinomatadainichi	1,396	4,580	Kanagawa
Mount Omusha	1,379	4,524	Hokkaidō
Mount Ibuki	1,377	4,518	Gifu / Shiga
Mount Tsurumi	1,374.5	4,510	Ōita
Mount Gomadan	1,372	4,501	Wakayama
Mount Oakan	1,370.4	4,496	Hokkaidō
Mount Nishikawa	1,362.0	4,468.5	Hokkaidō
Mount Mimuro	1,358.0	4,455.4	Hyōgo / Tottori
Mount Koma (Hakone)	1,357	4,452	Kanagawa
Mount Nozuka	1,353.2	4,440	Hokkaidō
Mount Goyo	1,351	4,432	Iwate
Mount Rutori	1,350.4	4,430	Hokkaidō
Mount Osorakan	1,346	4,416	Hiroshima / Shimane
Mount Okutoppu	1,346	4,416	Hokkaidō
Mount Shōkotsu	1,345.4	4,414	Hokkaidō
Mount Ushiro	1,345	4,413	Hyōgo / Okayama
Nakano Summit	1,341.4	4,401	Hokkaidō
Mount Shindainichi	1,340	4,400	Kanagawa
Mount Jakuchi	1,337	4,386	Yamaguchi
Mount Kamitaki	1,331	4,367	Hokkaidō
Mount Onnebetsu	1,330.2	4,364	Hokkaidō
Mount Karifuri	1,323.2	4,341	Hokkaidō
Mount Horohoro	1,322.3	4,338	Hokkaidō
Mount Eniwa	1,320	4,330	Hokkaidō
Mount Beppirigai	1,308	4,291	Hokkaidō
Mount Bukō	1,304	4,278	Saitama
Mount Kanmuri	1,256.6	4,123	Gifu
Mount Nagi	1,255	4,117	Tottori / Okayama
Mount Shiretoko	1,253.9	4,114	Hokkaidō
Mount Ōyama	1,252	4,108	Kanagawa
Mount Takami	1,248.3	4,095	Nara / Mie
Mount Tomamu	1,239.3	4,066	Hokkaidō
Mount Shisuniwa	1,235.6	4,054	Nara
Mount Hiroo	1,231	4,039	Hokkaidō
Mount Shaka	1,230	4,040	Fukuoka
Mount Mekunnai	1,220	4,000	Hokkaidō
Mount Bunagatake	1,214	3,983	Shiga
Mount Ashigara	1,213	3,980	Kanagawa / Shizuoka
Mount Gozaisho	1,212	3,976	Mie / Shiga
Mount Raiden	1,211.3	3,974	Hokkaidō
Mount Tsurugi	1,205.1	3,954	Hokkaidō
Mount Sannotō	1,205	3,953	Kanagawa
Mount Taushubetsu	1,185	3,888	Hokkaidō
Mount Gyōja	1,180	3,870	Kanagawa
Mount Kumami	1,175	3,855	Hokkaidō
Mount Pirigai	1,166.9	3,828	Hokkaidō
Mount Ninotō	1,144	3,753	Kanagawa
Mount Uenshiri	1,142.3	3,748	Hokkaidō
Mount Onigajo	1,142	3,747	Ehime / Kochi
Mount Karasuo	1,136	3,727	Kanagawa
Mount Myōken (Tajima)	1,135.5	3,725	Hyōgo
Hokkaidō Komagatake	1,131	3,711	Hokkaidō
Mount Hako	1,129.4	3,705	Hokkaidō
Mount Kongō	1,125	3,691	Osaka
Sakurajima	1,117	3,665	Kagoshima
Mount Toyoni (Erimo)	1,105.0	3,625.3	Hokkaidō
Mount Myōgi	1,103	3,619	Gunma
Mount Fuppushi	1,102.6	3,617	Hokkaidō
Pinneshiri (Kabato)	1,100.4	3,610	Hokkaidō
Mount Odasshu	1,097.7	3,601	Hokkaidō
Mount Obihiro	1,089.0	3,572.8	Hokkaidō
Mount Tara	1,076	3,530	Saga
Mount Daisengen	1,071.9	3,517	Hokkaidō
Mount Ryuo	1,060	3,480	Kagawa / Tokushima
Mount Sahoro	1,059.5	3,476	Hokkaidō
Mount Sefuri	1,054.6	3,460	Fukuoka / Saga
Mount Fure	1,046	3,432	Hokkaidō
Mount Tarumae	1,041	3,415	Hokkaidō
Mount Pisshiri	1,031.5	3,384	Hokkaidō
Mount Pisenai	1,027.4	3,371	Hokkaidō
Mount Yamizo	1,022	3,353	Ibaraki
Mount Uchiichi	1,021.7	3,352	Hokkaidō
Mount Santō	1,009.2	3,311	Hokkaidō
Mount Sen	1,005.2	3,298	Hyōgo
Mount Machine	1,002	3,287	Hokkaidō

== Mountains under 1000 metres ==
As the generally accepted definition of a mountain (versus a hill) is 1000 m of height and 500 m of prominence, the following list is provided for convenience only.

Mountain	Metres	Feet	Prefecture
Mount Piyashiri	987	3,238	Hokkaidō
Mount Ahoro	977	3,205	Hokkaidō
Otake	979	3,212	Kagoshima
Mount Minako	972	3,189	Kyoto
Mount Yamato Katsuragi	959.2	3,147	Nara / Osaka
Pinneshiri (Hidaka)	958.2	3,144	Hokkaidō
Mount Seppiko	950	3,120	Hyōgo
Mount Kamuishiri	946.7	3,106	Hokkaidō
Mount Kasagata	939.4	3,082	Hyōgo
Mount Naka Katsuragi	937	3,074	Nara / Osaka
Mount Kannon	932	3,058	Hokkaidō
Mount Rokkō	931	3,054	Hyōgo
Mount Atago	924	3,031	Kyoto
Mount Kaimon	924	3,031	Kagoshima
Mount Ikeda	923.9	3,031	Gifu
Mount Minami Katsuragi	922	3,025	Osaka / Wakayama
Mount Okishimappu	895	2,936	Hokkaidō
Mount Tsukuba	877	2,877	Ibaraki
Mount Hakamagoshi	872.3	2,862	Hokkaidō
Mount Hino	871	2,858	Fukui
Mount Monbetsu	865.8	2,841	Hokkaidō
Mount Yōrō	859.3	2,819	Gifu
Mount Izumi Katsuragi	858	2,815	Osaka / Wakayama
Mount Kamui (Lake Mashū caldera)	857	2,812	Hokkaidō
Hachijo-fuji	854	2,802	Tokyo (Ogasawara Islands)
Mount Hiei	848	2,782	Kyoto
Mount Apoi	810.6	2,659	Hokkaidō
Mount Mitake	793	2,602	Hyōgo
Mount Miyama	790.5	2,594	Osaka / Kyoto
Mount Hongū	789.2	2,589	Aichi
Mount Kenpi	784	2,572	Osaka
Mount Mihara	758	2,487	Tokyo (Ogasawara Islands)
Mount Ruchishi	754	2,474	Hokkaidō
Mount Usu	733	2,405	Hokkaidō
Mount Nishigatake	727	2,385	Hyōgo
Mount Yoko (Hidaka)	725.3	2,380	Hokkaidō
Mount Shirakami	721	2,365	Hyōgo
Mount Taka (Osaka/Hyōgo)	720.8	2,365	Osaka / Hyōgo
Eboshi-dake (Aomori)	719.6	2,361	Aomori
Mount Yajuro	715.1	2,346	Hyōgo
Mount Kaba	709	2,326	Ibaraki
Mount Iō (Iōjima)	703.7	2,309	Kagoshima
Mount Maya	698.6	2,292	Hyōgo
Mount Yuwan	694	2,277	Kagoshima
Mount Maru (Esan)	691.1	2,267	Hokkaidō
Mount Nagamine	687.8	2,257	Hyōgo
Mount Tengu	666	2,185	Hokkaidō
Mount Kinpu	665.2	2,182	Kumamoto
Mount Tappukoppu	661.1	2,169	Hokkaidō
Mount Hachimen	659	2,162	Ōita
Mount Yatate	649	2,129	Nagasaki
Mount Ikoma	642	2,106	Nara/Osaka
Mount E	617.6	2,026	Hokkaidō
Mount Takao	599	1,965	Tokyo
Mount Chigogabaka	596.3	1,956	Hyōgo
Mount Taishaku	585.9	1,922	Hyōgo
Mount Kurama	584	1,916	Kyoto
Mount Iwahara	573	1,880	Hyōgo
Mount Omoto	526	1,726	Okinawa
Mount Tanjō	514	1,686	Hyōgo
Mount Hakusan (Hyōgo)	510	1,670	Hyōgo
Mount Iō (Akan)	508	1,667	Hokkaidō
Mount Morappu	506.6	1,662	Hokkaidō
Mount Yonaha	498	1,634	Okinawa
Mount Rebun	490.0	1,607.6	Hokkaidō
Mount Iwakura	488	1,601	Hyōgo
Mount Nakayama	478	1,568	Hyōgo
Mount Miwa	467	1,532	Nara
Mount Yae	453	1,486	Okinawa
Mount Katsuragi (Izunokuni)	452	1,483	Shizuoka
Mount Mikami	430	1,410	Shiga
Mount Katsuma	428	1,404	Hokkaidō
Mount Dodo	417.9	1,371	Gifu
Mount Atago (Chiba)	408	1,339	Chiba
Showashinzan	398	1,306	Hokkaidō
Mount Shosha	371	1,217	Hyogo
Mount Wakakusa	342	1,122	Nara
Mount Hakodate	334	1,096	Hokkaidō
Mount Inasa	333	1,093	Nagasaki
Mount Nokogiri (Chiba)	329.5	1,081	Chiba
Mount Kinka	328.9	1,079	Gifu
Mount Mizugasawa	323.4	1,061	Aomori
Mount Kabutoyama	309	1,014	Hyōgo
Mount Asahi (Ishikari)	295.2	969	Hokkaidō
Hyakujo Rock	292.2	959	Hyōgo
Mount Bizan	280	920	Tokushima
Mount Daimaru	271	889	Hokkaidō
Mount Karasuba	266.6	875	Chiba
Mount Ōgusu	242	794	Kanagawa
Mount Ishikawa	204	669	Okinawa
Mount Suribachi	166	545	Tokyo (Ogasawara Islands)
Mount Utatsu	149	489	Ishikawa
Mount Maru (Hiroo)	117.0	383.9	Hokkaidō
Mount Komaki	85.9	282	Aichi

== See also ==
- List of Japanese prefectures by highest mountain
