= Mount Tappukoppu =

Mountain in Hokkaidō, Japan

- 多峰古峰山

Highest point
- Elevation: 661.1 m (2,169 ft)
- Listing: List of mountains and hills of Japan by height
- Coordinates: 42°41′38″N 141°17′50″E

Geography
- Location: Hokkaidō, Japan
- Parent range: Nasu Volcanic Zone
- Topo map(s): Geographical Survey Institute (国土地理院, Kokudochiriin) 25000:1 風不死岳, 50000:1 樽前山

Geology
- Rock age: Holocene
- Mountain type: volcanic
- Volcanic arc: Northeast Japan Arc

Mount Tappukoppu (多峰古峰山, Tappukoppu-san)

is a mountain located in Shikotsu-Toya National Park in Hokkaidō, Japan. It sits on the south shore of Lake Shikotsu, a caldera lake.
