= Mount Shakka =

Mountain in the Ōmine Mountains in Japan

Mount Shaka
- 釈迦ヶ岳
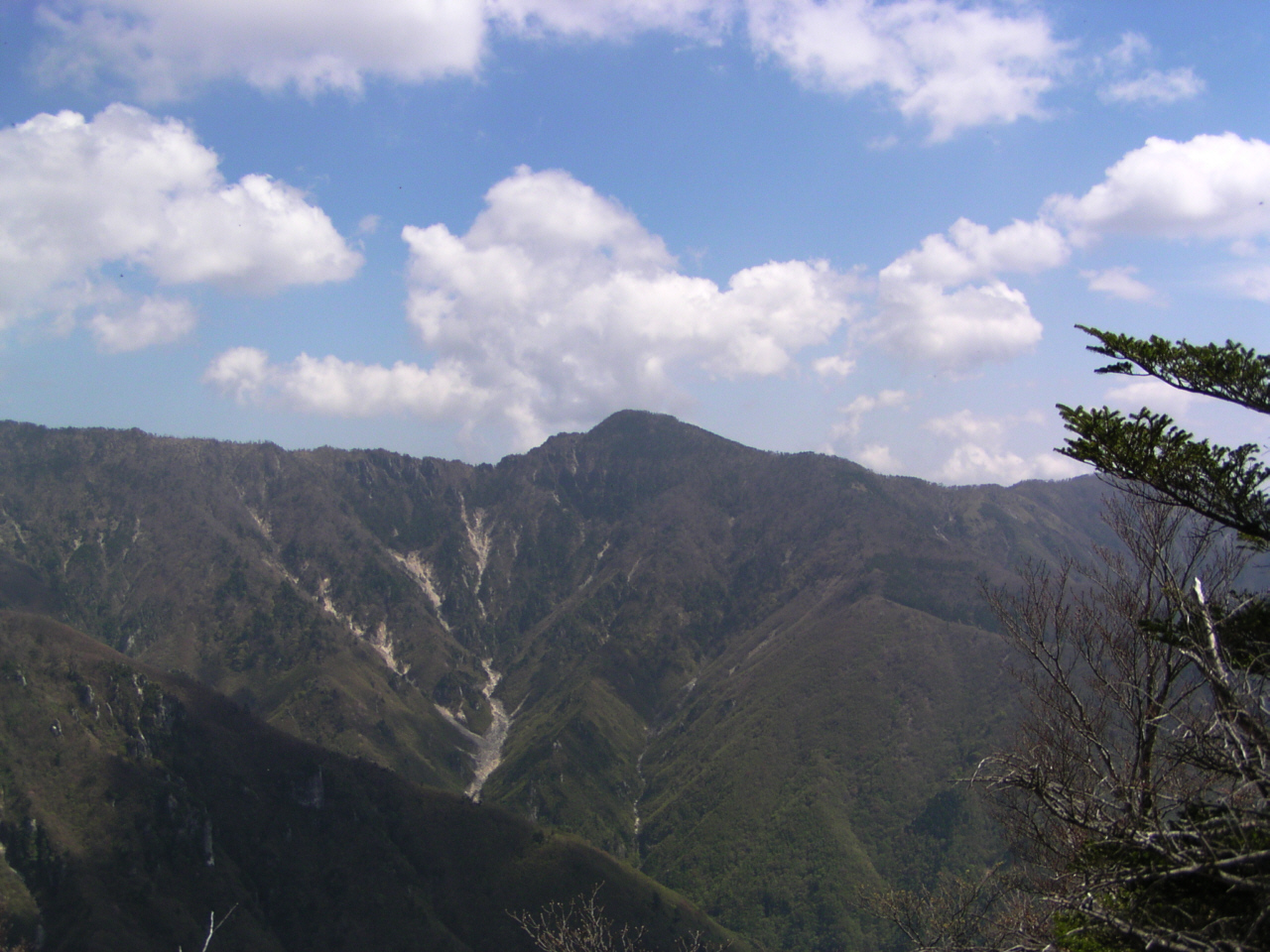
- Mount Shaka (November 2008)

Highest point
- Elevation: 1,799.6 m (5,904 ft)
- Listing: List of mountains and hills of Japan by height
- Coordinates: 34°06′51″N 135°54′11″E

Geography
- Location within Japan
- Location: Nara Prefecture, Japan
- Parent range: Ōmine Mountains
- Topo map(s): Geographical Survey Institute; 25000:1 釈迦ヶ岳; 50000:1 和歌山

Mount Shaka (釈迦ヶ岳, Shaka-ga-take) is a mountain in the Ōmine Mountains in Japan. It marks part of the border between Totsukawa and Shimokitayama in Yoshino District of Nara Prefecture.
