= Mount Katsuma =

Mountain in Japan

- 勝澗山

Highest point
- Elevation: 428 m (1,404 ft)
- Listing: List of mountains and hills of Japan by height
- Coordinates: 42°11′46″N 139°27′49″E

Naming
- Language of name: Ainu

Geography
- Location: Hokkaidō, Japan
- Topo map(s): Geographical Survey Institute 25000:1 神威脇; 50000:1 久遠

Geology
- Last eruption: 300,000 to 200,000 years ago

Mount Katsuma (勝澗山, Katsuma Yama) is a volcano on Okushiri Island in Okushiri, Hokkaidō, Japan. The volcano is mostly rhyolitic.
