= Mount Morappu =

Mountain in Hokkaido, Japan

- モラップ山
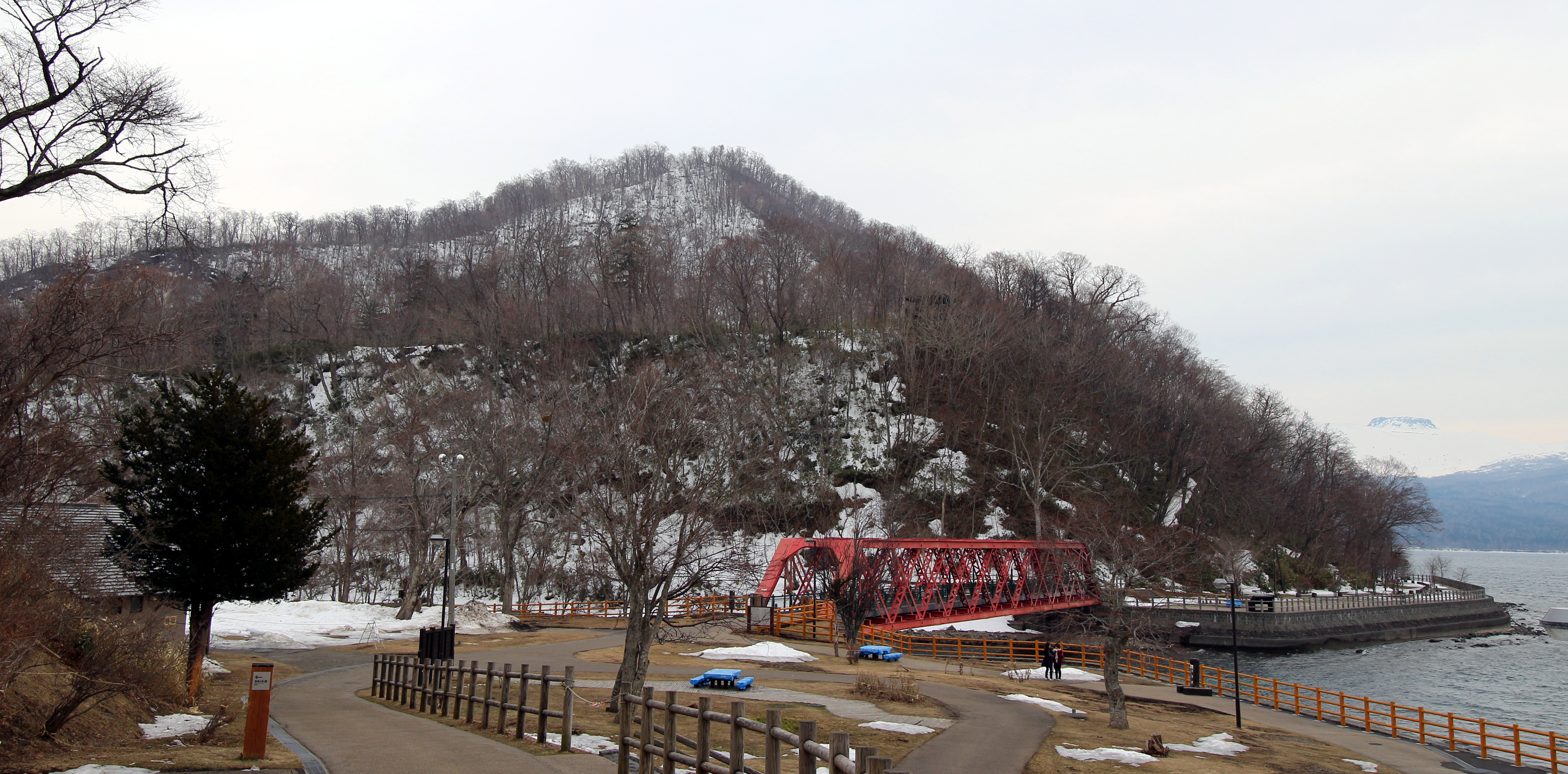
- Mount Morappu in Spring

Highest point
- Elevation: 506.6 m (1,662 ft)
- Listing: List of mountains and hills of Japan by height
- Coordinates: 42°45′14″N 141°24′48″E

Geography
- Location: Hokkaidō, Japan
- Parent range: Nasu Volcanic Zone
- Topo map(s): Geographical Survey Institute (国土地理院, Kokudochiriin) 25000:1 樽前山, 25000:1 支笏湖温泉, 50000:1 樽前山

Geology
- Rock age: Holocene
- Mountain type: volcanic
- Volcanic arc: Northeastern Japan Arc

Mount Morappu (モラップ山, Morappu-san) is a mountain located in Shikotsu-Toya National Park in Hokkaidō, Japan. It sits on the shore of Lake Shikotsu, a caldera lake. It also hosts a nationally established ski slope.
