= Mount Azami =

Mountain in Japan

- 薊岳
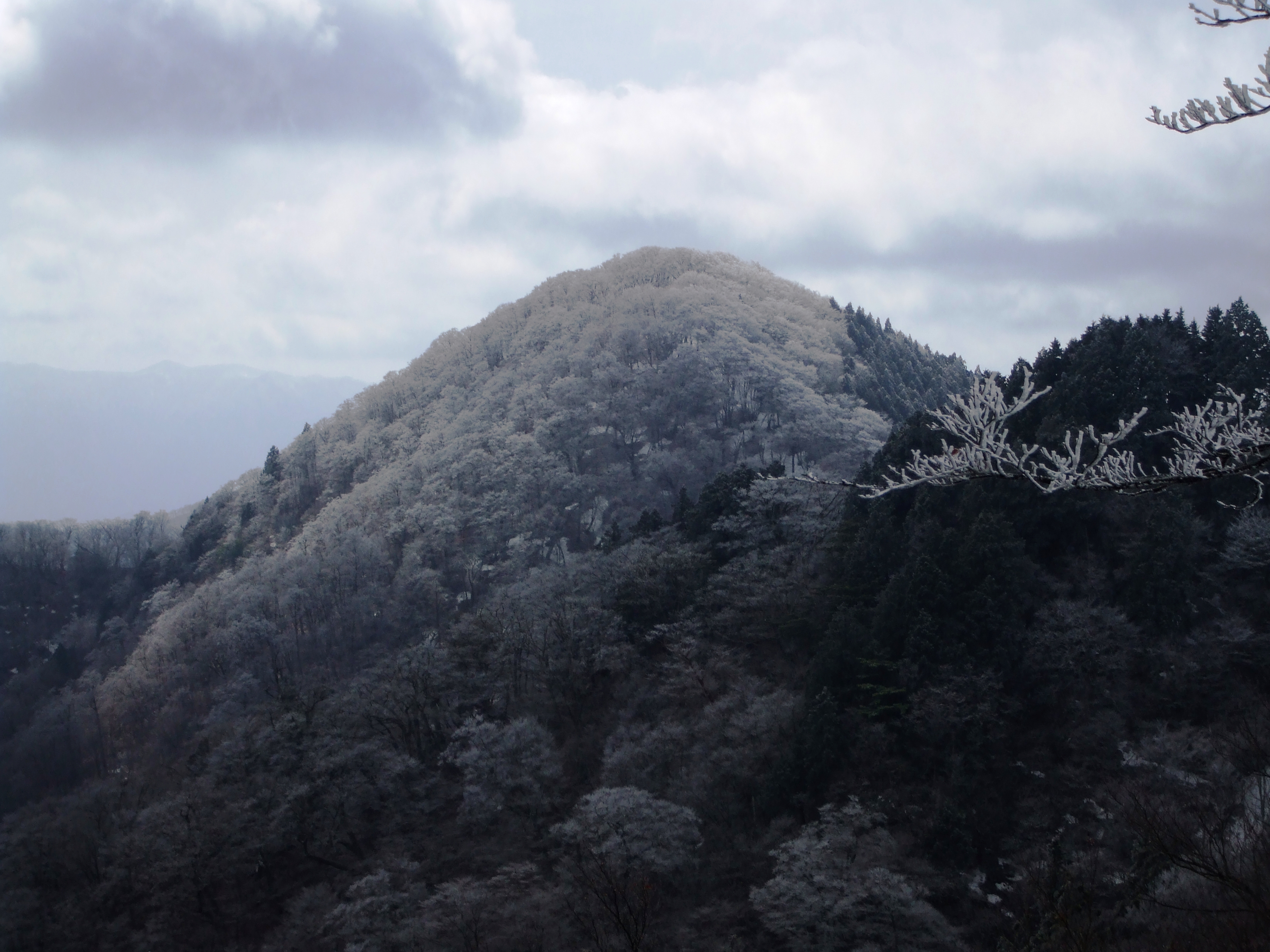
- Mount Azami from the east (March 2009)

Highest point
- Elevation: 1,406 m (4,613 ft)
- Listing: List of mountains and hills of Japan by height
- Coordinates: 34°21′39″N 136°03′57″E

Naming
- Language of name: Japanese
- Pronunciation: [azamidake]

Geography
- Location within Japan
- Location: Higashiyoshino and Kawakami, Nara, Japan
- Parent range: Daikō Mountains
- Topo map(s): Geographical Survey Institute 25000:1 大豆生; 50000:1 伊勢

Mount Azami (薊岳, Azamidake) is a 1,406 m (4,613 ft) mountain, located on the border of Higashiyoshino and Kawakami, Nara, Japan.

== Outline ==
Mount Azami is one of the Daikō Mountains. Its two peaks are known as Oyama (男山) and Meyama (女山), respectively meaning male peak and female peak. It is one of the Kinki 100 mountains.

== Route ==
The most popular route is from Ōmata Bus Stop of Nara Kōtsu. It takes two and a half hours via Mount Ōkagami.

== Access ==
- Ōmata Bus Stop of Nara Kōtsu

== Gallery ==
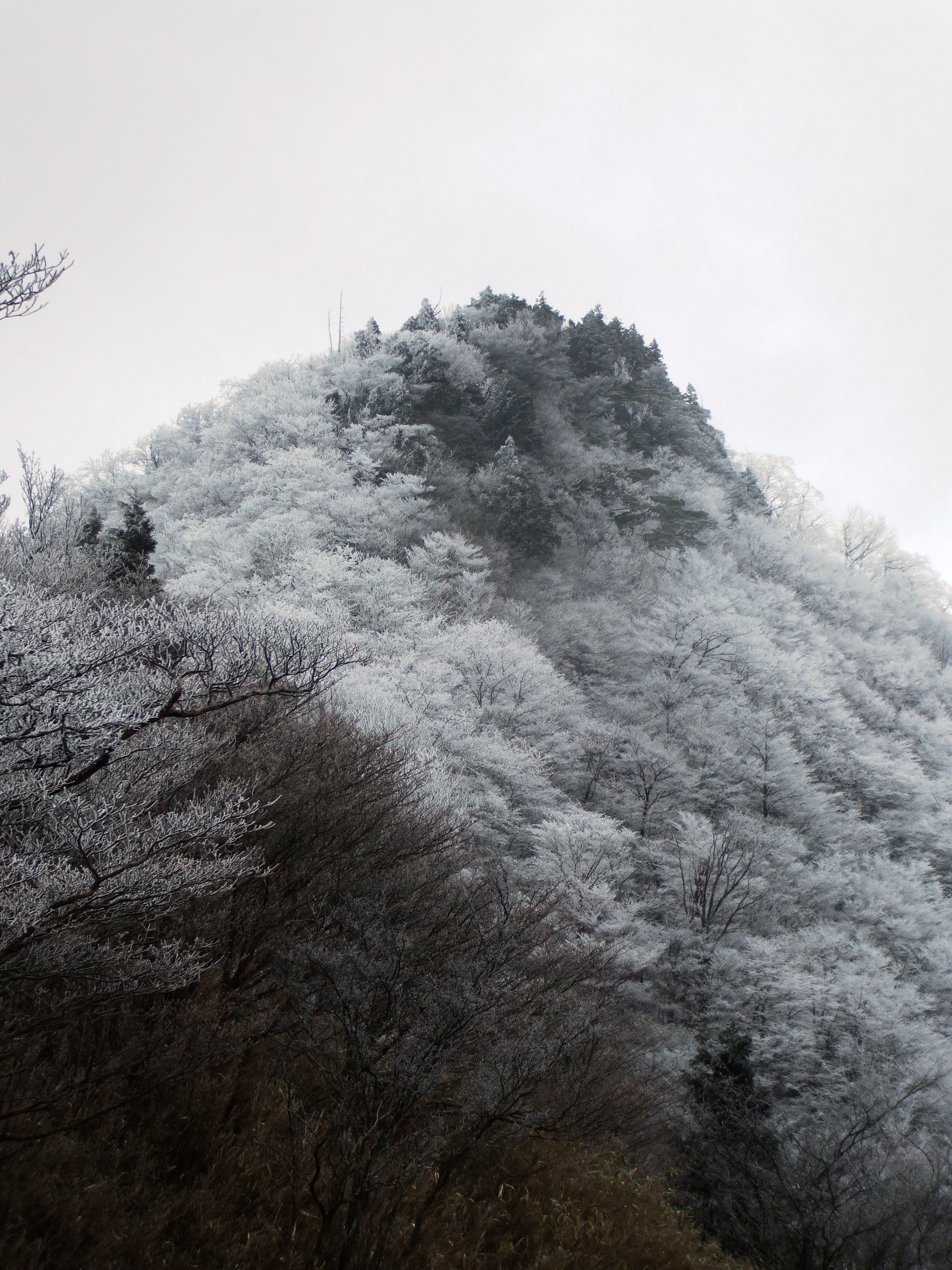
Mount Azami from the west (03/2009)

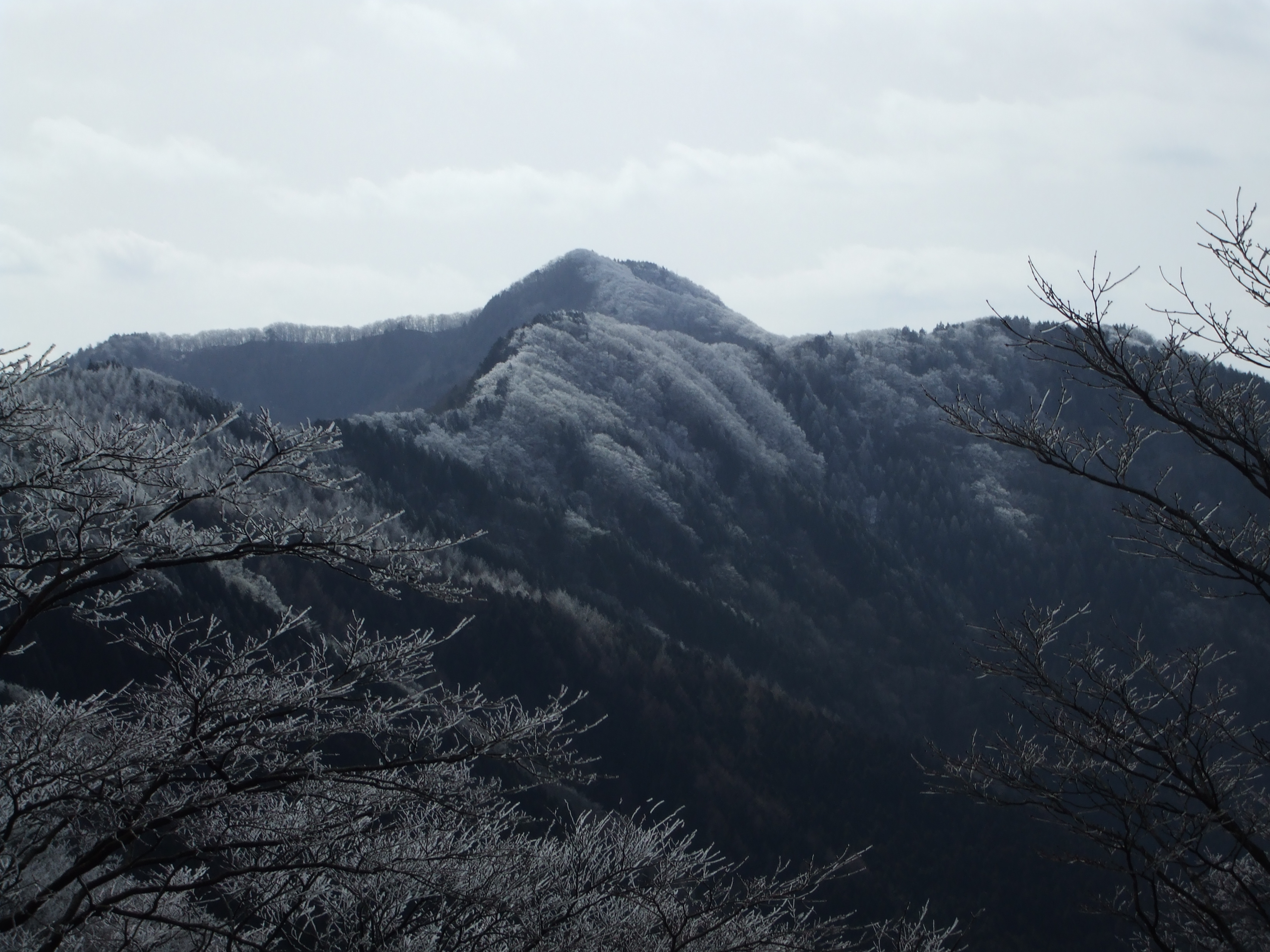
Mount Azami from Myojindani Valley (03/2009)

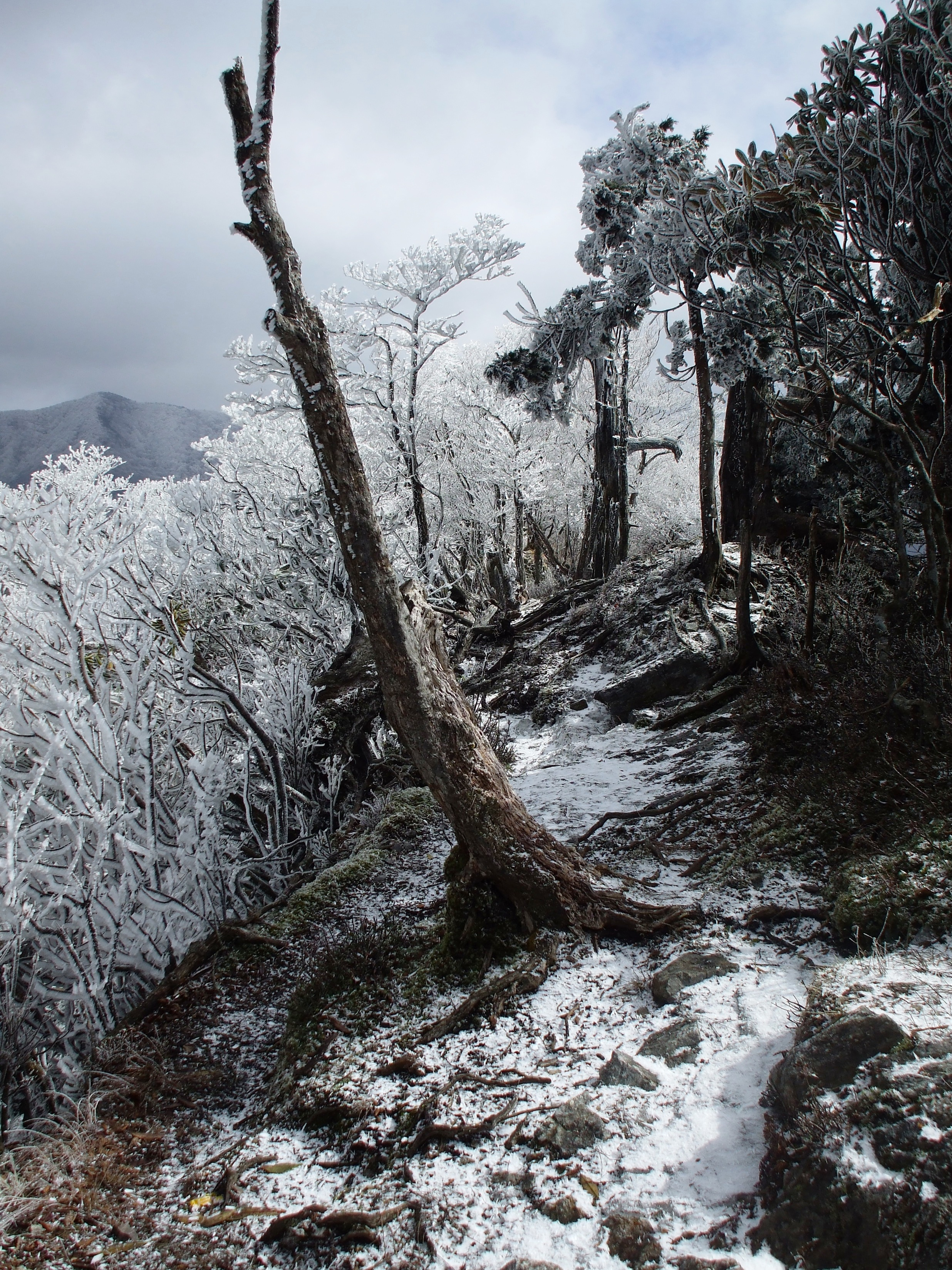
At the top of Mount Azami (Oyama) (03/2009)

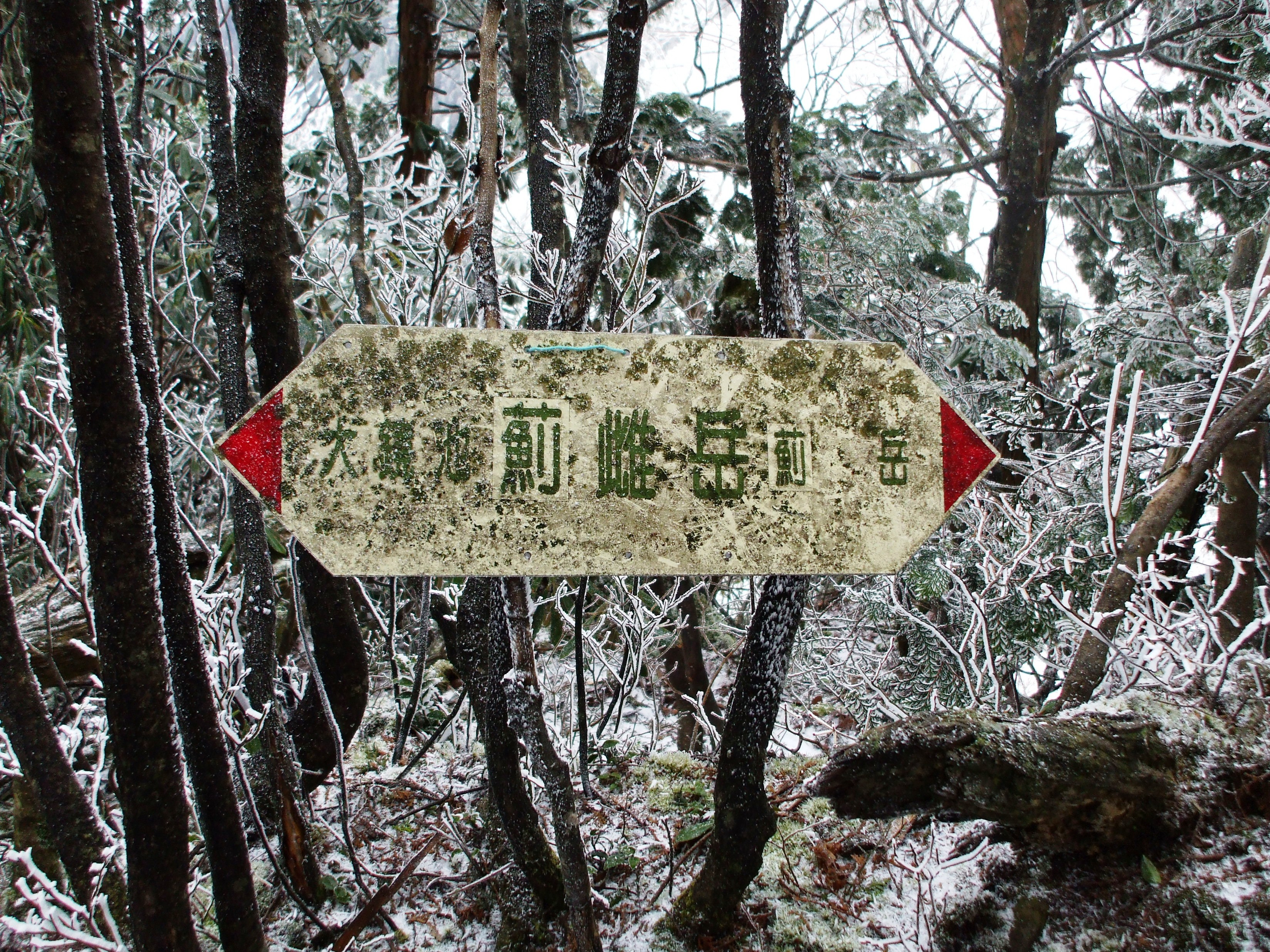
At the top of Mount Azami (Meyama) (03/2009)

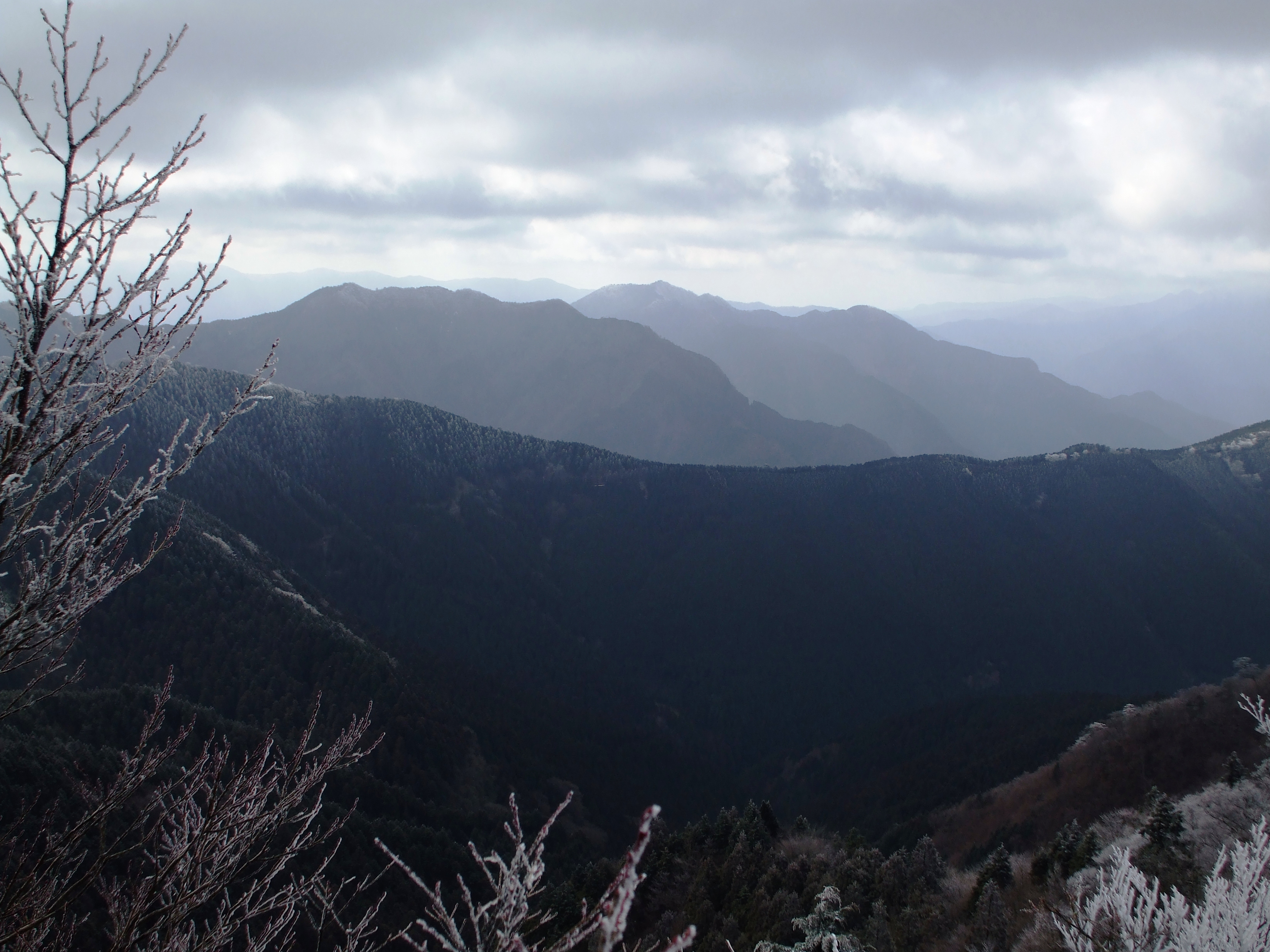
A view from the top of Mount Azami (South) (03/2009)

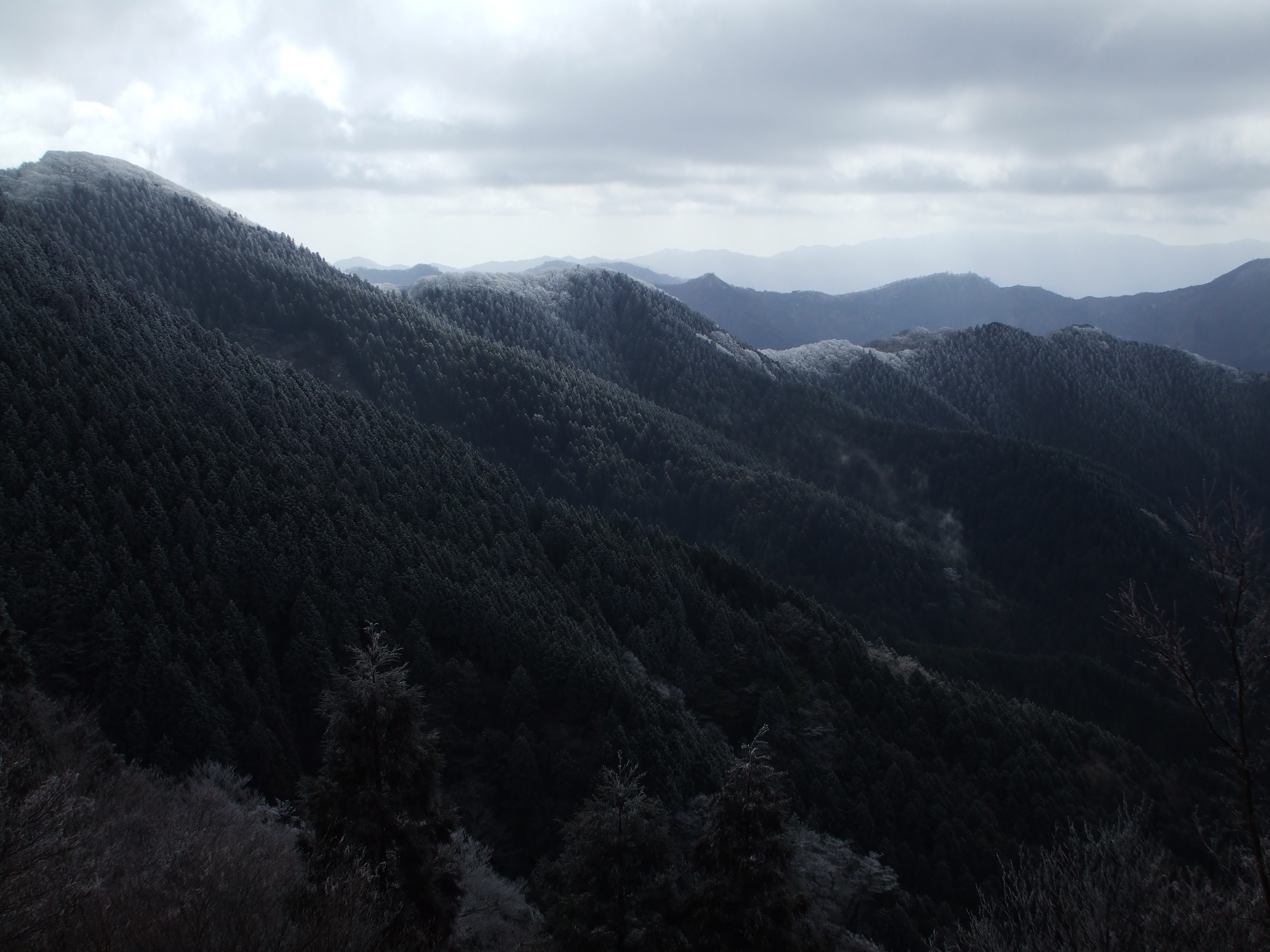
A view from the top of Mount Azami (Southeast) (03/2009)

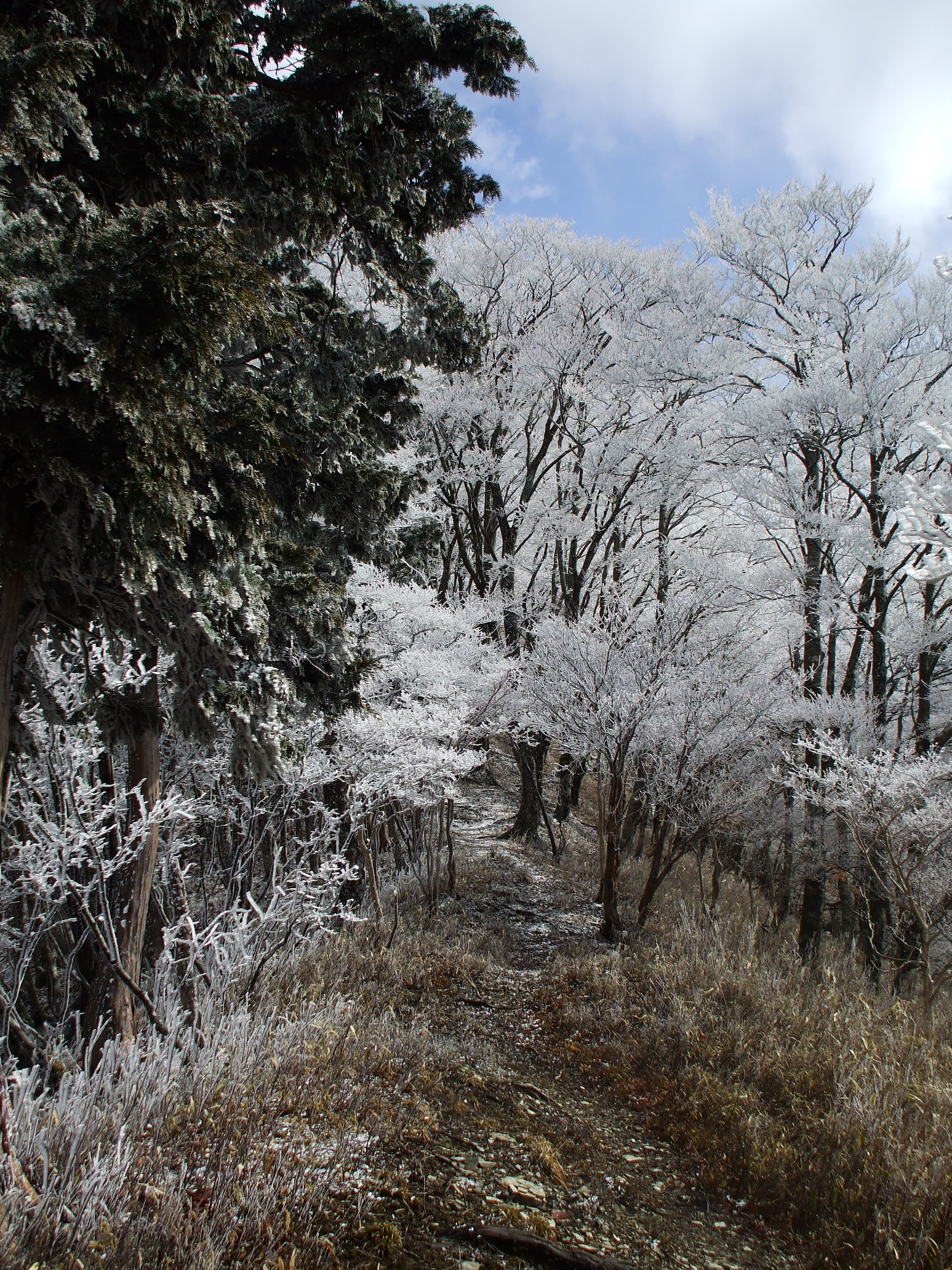
At Mount Azami (03/2009)

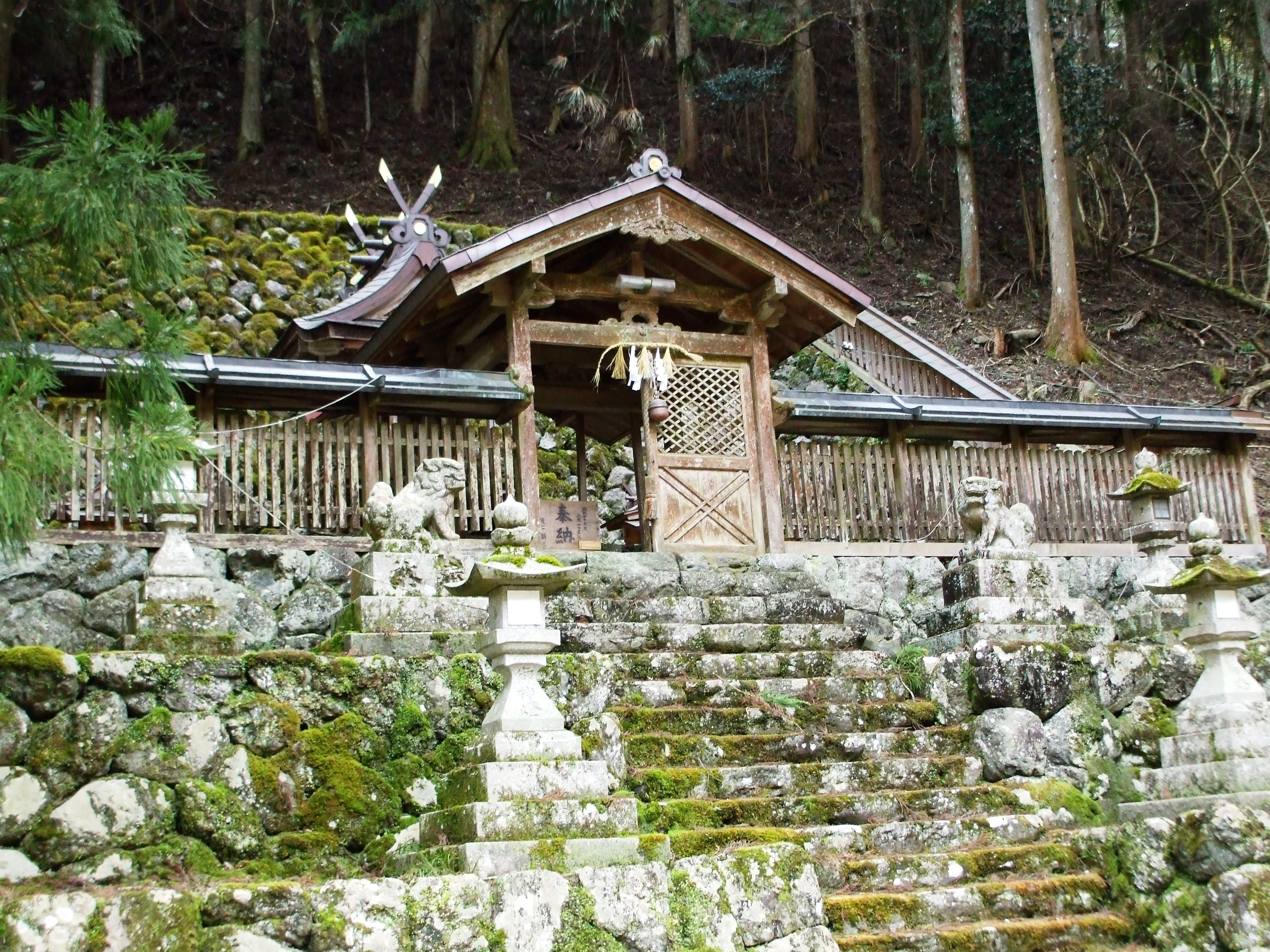
Sasano Shrine at Ōmata (03/2009)
