= Mount Taushubetsu =

Mountain in Hokkaido, Japan

- タウシュベツ山
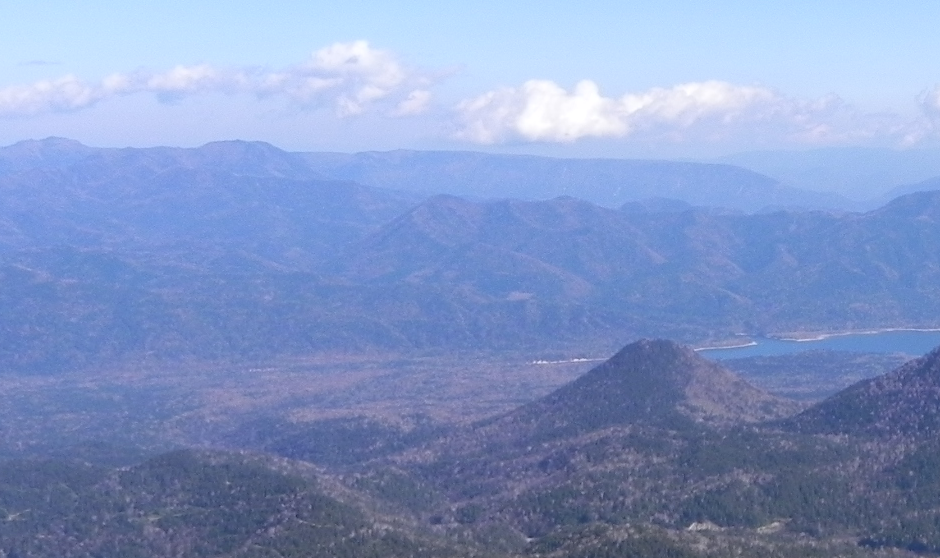

Highest point
- Elevation: 1,185.1 m (3,888 ft)
- Listing: Mountains and hills of Japan
- Coordinates: 43°26′57″N 143°12′40″E

Geography
- Location within Japan
- Location: hokkaido, Japan
- Parent range: Ishikari Mountains

Mount Taushubetsu (タウシュベツ山, Taushubetsu-yama) is a mountain in Kamishihoro and Ashoro, Hokkaido, Japan. The mountain name means "river with many birch trees" in Ainu.
