= Mount Chūbetsu =

Mountain in Hokkaido, Japan

- 忠別岳
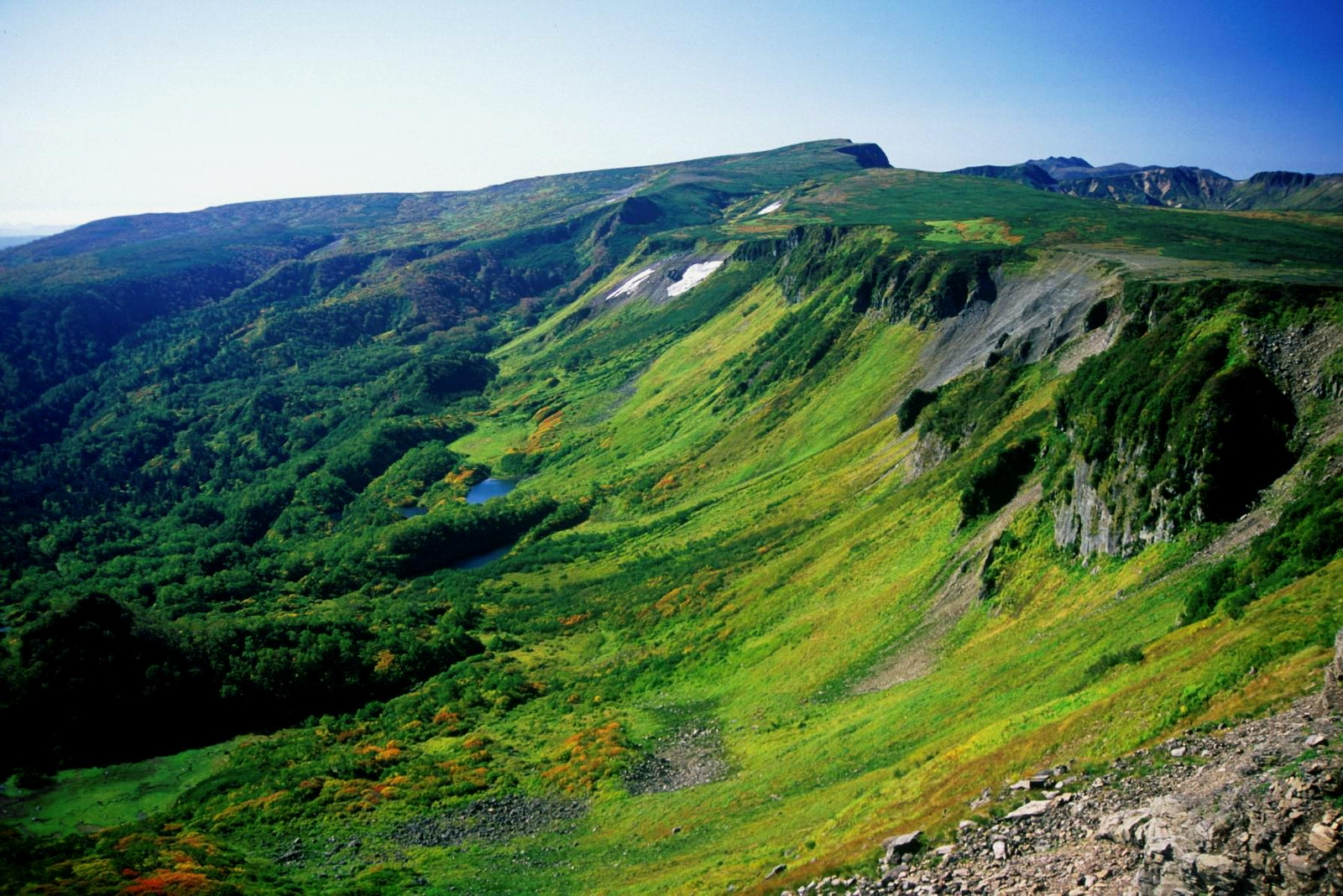
- Mount Chubetsu and Kogen-numa

Highest point
- Elevation: 1,962.8 m (6,440 ft)
- Listing: List of mountains and hills of Japan by height
- Coordinates: 43°35′19″N 142°53′54″E

Geography
- Location within Japan Location within Hokkaido
- Location: Hokkaidō, Japan
- Topo map(s): Geographical Survey Institute (国土地理院, Kokudochiriin) 25000:1 白雲岳; 50000:1 旭川

Geology
- Rock age: Quaternary
- Mountain type: Stratovolcano
- Last eruption: 800 thousand to 1 million years ago

Mount Chūbetsu (忠別岳, Chūbetsu-dake) is located in the Daisetsuzan National Park, Hokkaidō, Japan. It is an andesitic stratovolcano.
