= Mount Memuro =

Mountain in Hokkaido, Japan

- 芽室岳
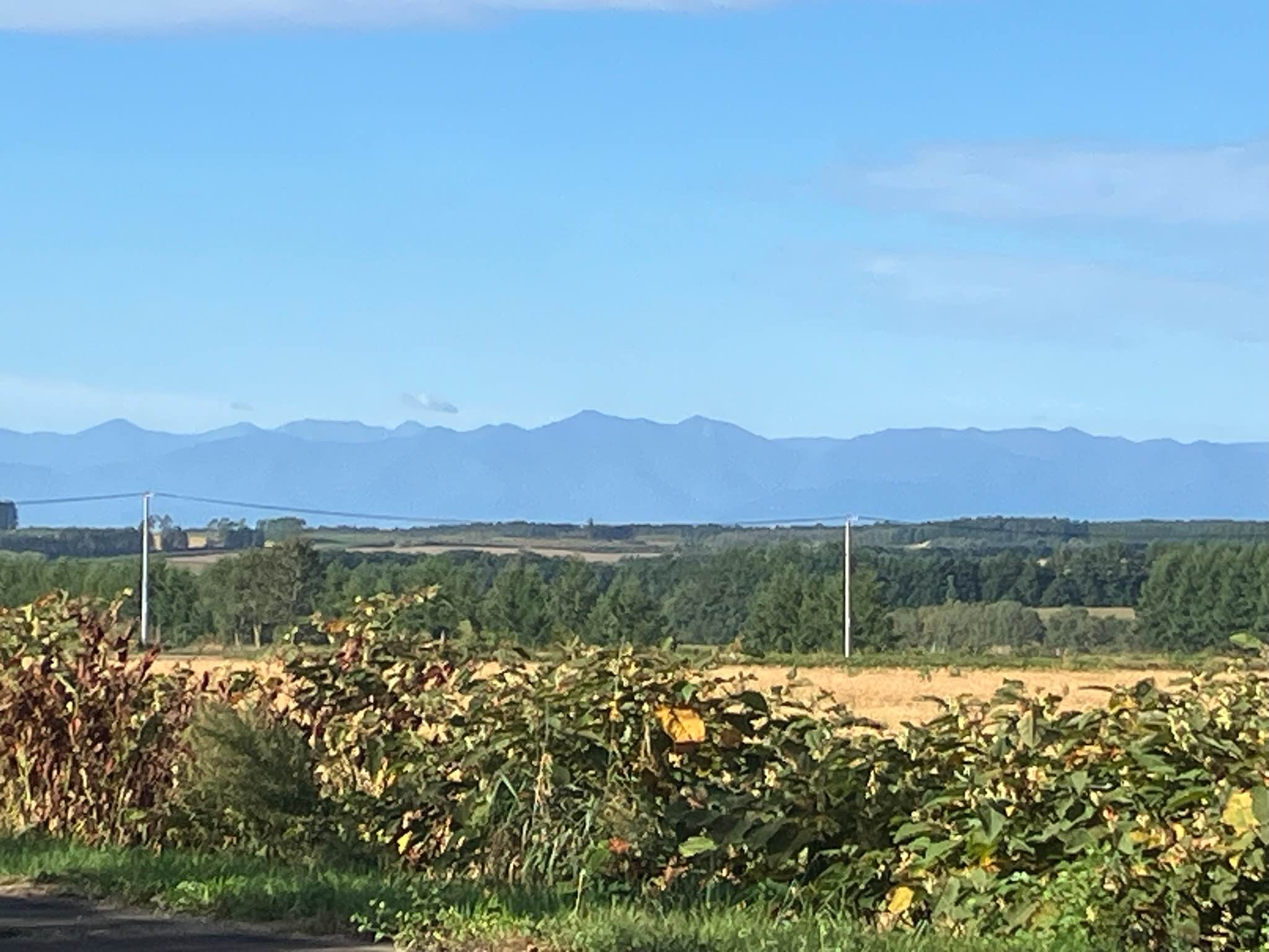
- Mount Memuro as seen from Hokkaido Prefectural Road 337

Highest point
- Elevation: 1,753.7 m (5,754 ft)
- Listing: List of mountains and hills of Japan by height
- Coordinates: 42°52′8″N 142°47′7″E

Geography
- Location: Hokkaidō, Japan
- Parent range: Hidaka Mountains
- Topo map(s): Geographical Survey Institute (国土地理院, Kokudochiriin) 25000:1 芽室岳

Geology
- Mountain type: Fold (geology)

Climbing
- Easiest route: Memuro River North Ridge Route

Mount Memuro (芽室岳, Memuro-dake)

is a mountain located in the Hidaka Mountains, Hokkaidō, Japan. The western summit of Mount Memuro (1746 m) is named Mount Pankenūshi.
