= Mount Horohoro =

Mountain in Hokkaido, Japan

- ホロホロ山
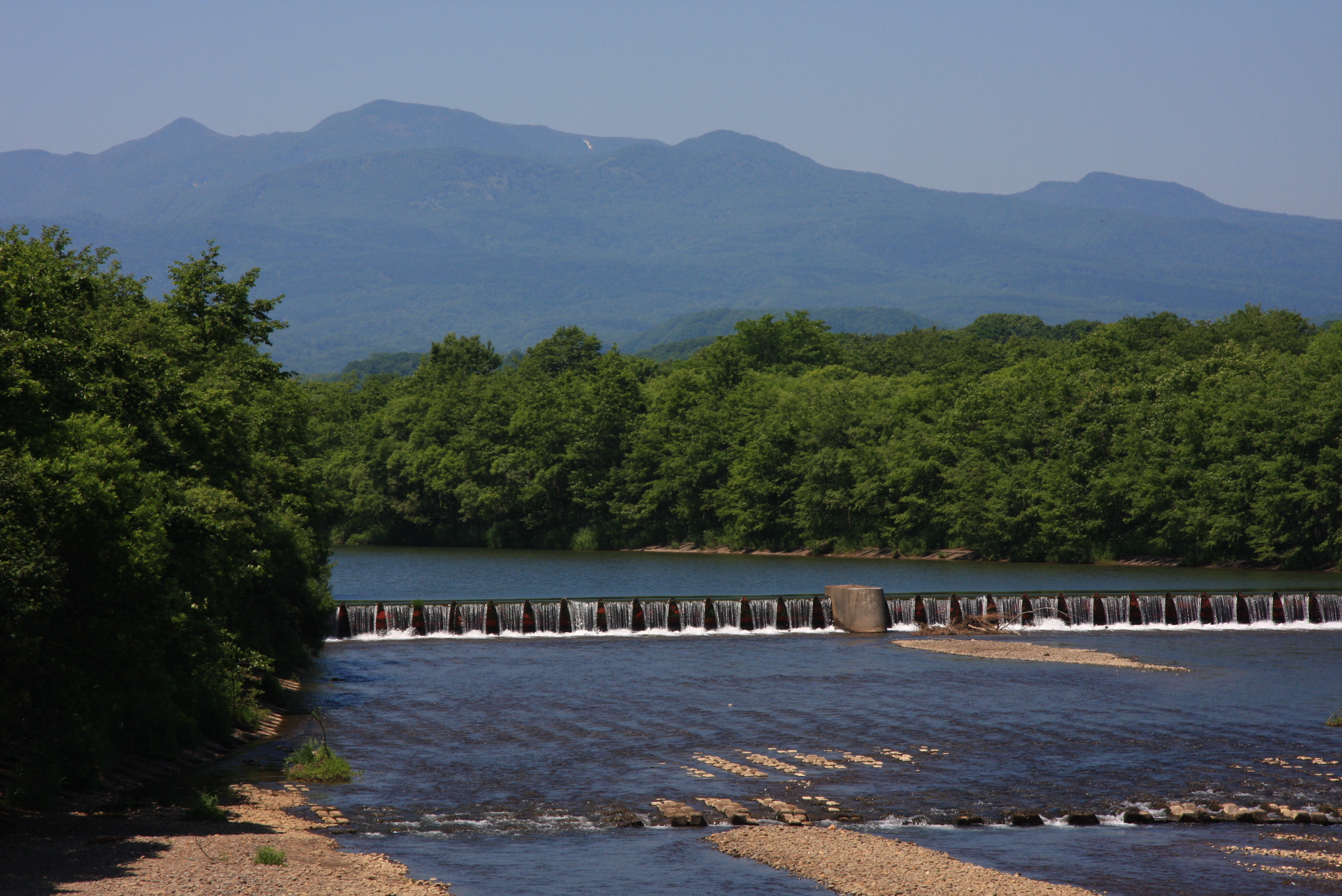
- View of Mount Horohoro

Highest point
- Elevation: 1,322.3 m (4,338 ft)
- Listing: List of mountains and hills of Japan by height
- Coordinates: 42°38′N 141°8′E

Geography
- Location: Hokkaidō, Japan
- Topo map(s): Geographical Survey Institute; 25000:1 徳舜瞥山; 50000:1 徳舜瞥山

Mount Horohoro (ホロホロ山, Horohoro-yama) is a mountain in Hokkaidō. It is located on the border between Date and Shiraoi in Hokkaidō, Japan. It is the tallest mountain in the Iburi subprefecture. From the top, Lake Tōya, Lake Shikotsu, Mount Yōtei, Mount Eniwa, and even the outskirts of Sapporo are all visible.
