= Mount Yumiori =

Mountain in Gifu Prefecture, Japan

- 弓折岳
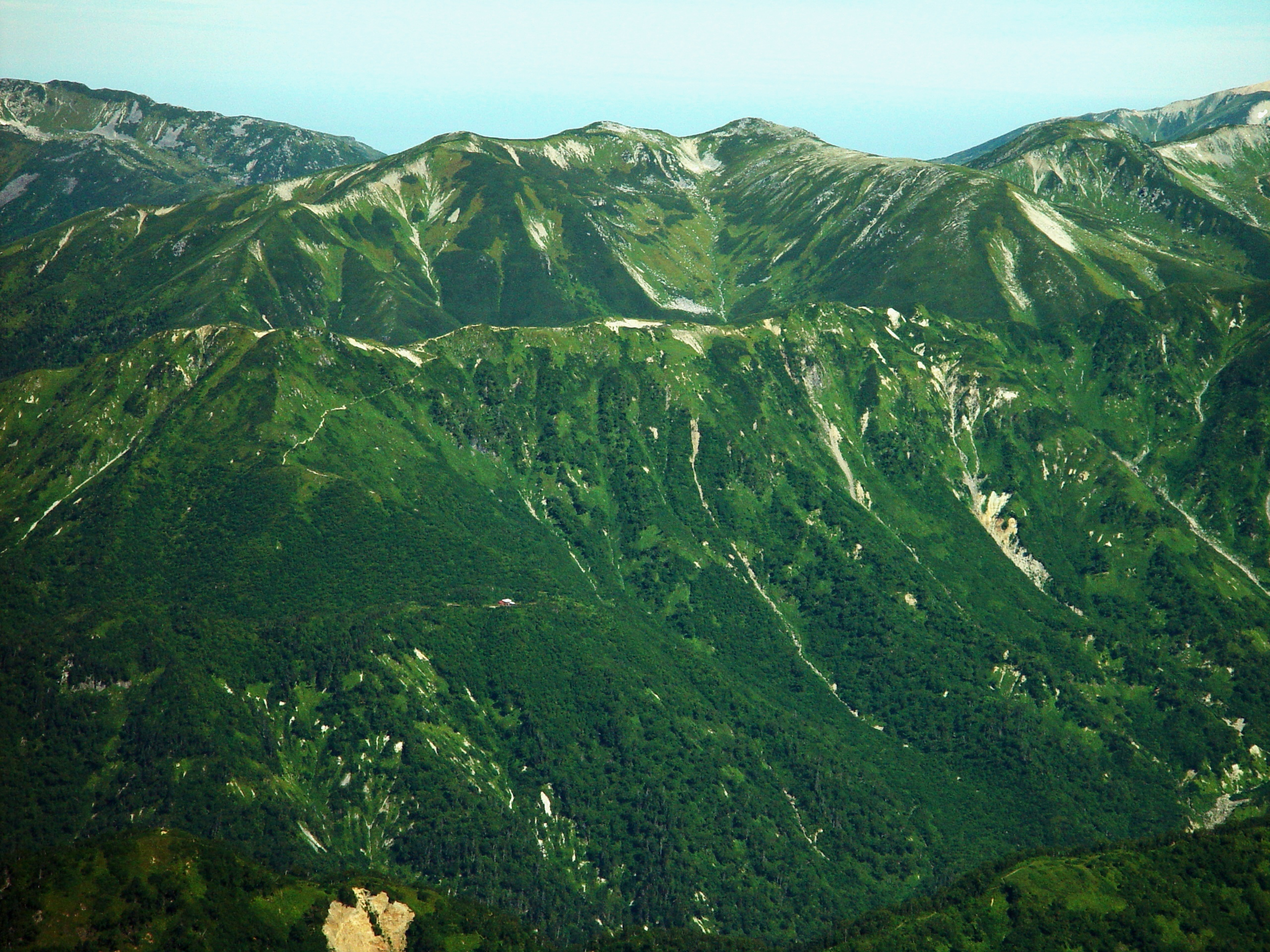
- Mount Yumiori and Mount Sugoroku from Mount Karasawa

Highest point
- Elevation: 2,592 m (8,504 ft)
- Coordinates: 36°20′58″N 137°35′48″E

Geography
- Location: Takayama, Gifu Prefecture, Japan
- Parent range: Hida Mountains

Mount Yumiori (弓折岳, Yumiori-dake) is a mountain located in the city of Takayama, Gifu, Japan. It is 2,592 m (8,504 ft) tall and part of the Hida Mountains.
