= Mount Monbetsu =

Mountain in Hokkaidō, Japan

- 紋別岳
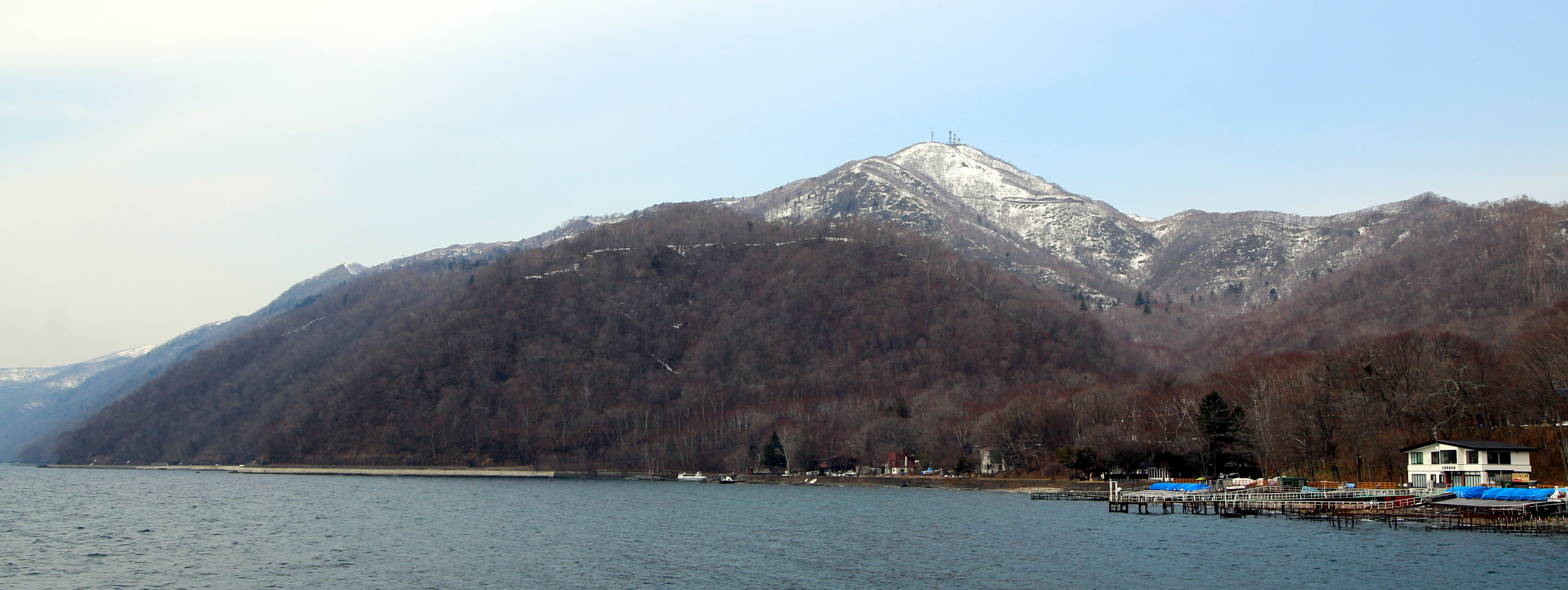
- Mount Monbetsu in Spring

Highest point
- Elevation: 865.8 m (2,841 ft)
- Listing: List of mountains and hills of Japan by height
- Coordinates: 42°47′38″N 141°23′39″E

Geography
- Location: Hokkaidō, Japan
- Parent range: Nasu Volcanic Zone
- Topo map(s): Geographical Survey Institute (国土地理院, Kokudochiriin) 25000:1 支笏湖温泉, 50000:1 樽前山

Geology
- Rock age: Holocene
- Mountain type: volcanic
- Volcanic arc: Northeast Japan Arc

Climbing
- Easiest route: Hiking

Mount Monbetsu (紋別岳, Mombetsu-dake) is a mountain located in Shikotsu-Toya National Park in Hokkaidō, Japan. It sits on the shore of Lake Shikotsu, a caldera lake. It also hosts a radio relay station.

== Climbing Route ==
There is a road from Lake Shikotsu shore to the top of the mountain.
