= Mount Ōsasa =

Mountain in Nagano Prefecture, Japan

- 大笹峰
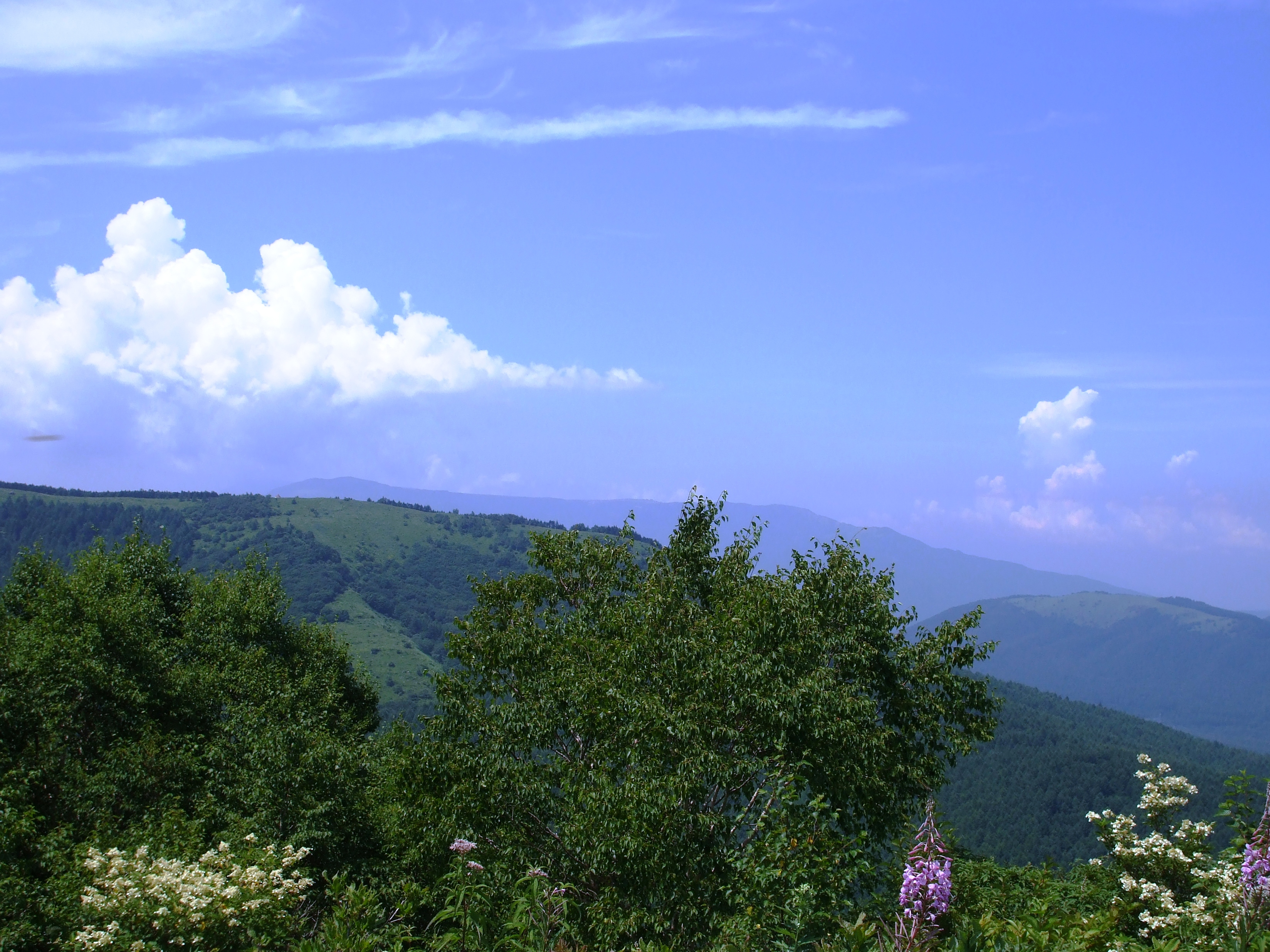
- Mount Ōsasa from Mount Denjō

Highest point
- Elevation: 1,807.3 m (5,929 ft)
- Listing: List of mountains and hills of Japan by height
- Coordinates: 36°7′32″N 138°11′42″E

Naming
- Language of name: Japanese
- Pronunciation: [oːsasamine]

Geography
- Location: Nagawa, Nagano, Japan
- Parent range: Kirigamine

Mount Ōsasa (大笹峰, Ōsasa-mine) is a 1,807.3 m (5,929 ft) mountain of Chushin Highland, located in Nagawa, Nagano Prefecture, Japan. This mountain is a part of the Yatsugatake-Chūshin Kōgen Quasi-National Park.

== Leisure ==
On Mount Ōsasa, there is Blanche Takayama Sky Resort.

== Route ==
There are several routes to the top of the mountain. The easiest route is to use sky lifts of Blanche Takayama Sky Resort from Takayama in winter. From April to November many climbers use a route from Himekidaira.

== Access ==
- Himekidaira-Chuo Bus Stop of JR Kanto Bus

== Gallery ==
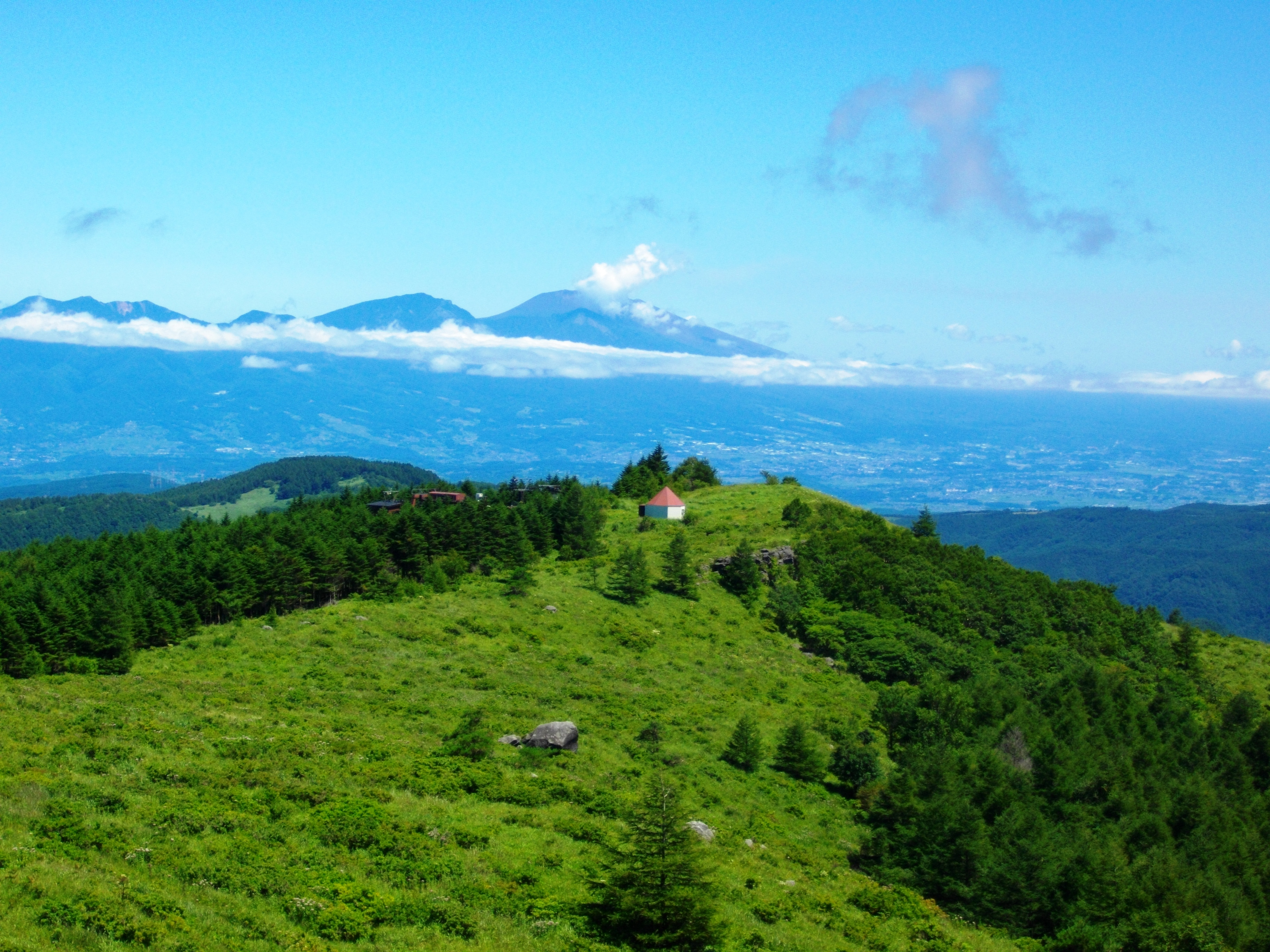
Summit of Mount Ōsasa

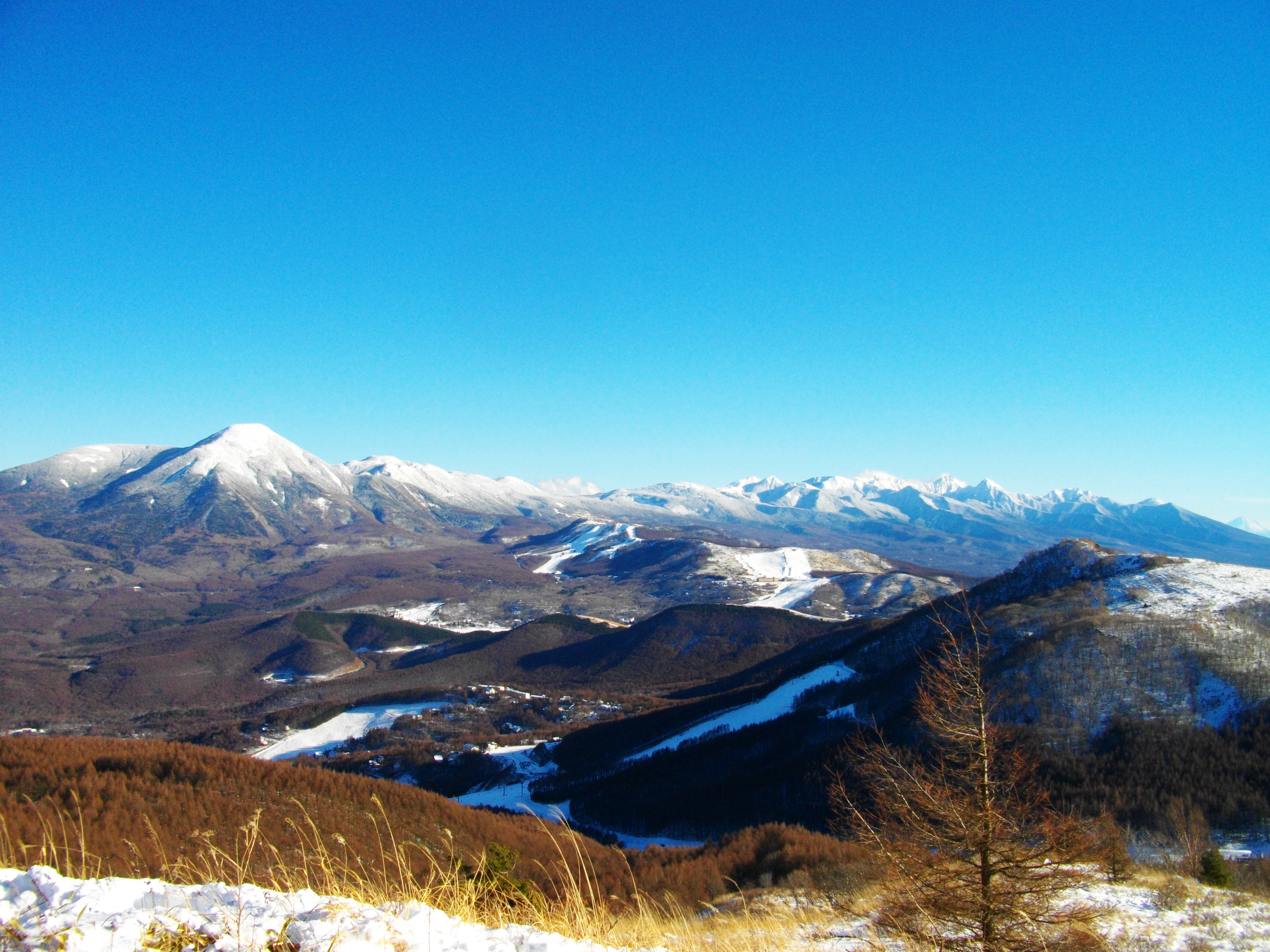
Yatsugatake Mountains with Mount Tateshina and Mount Fuji from the top of Mount Ōsasa

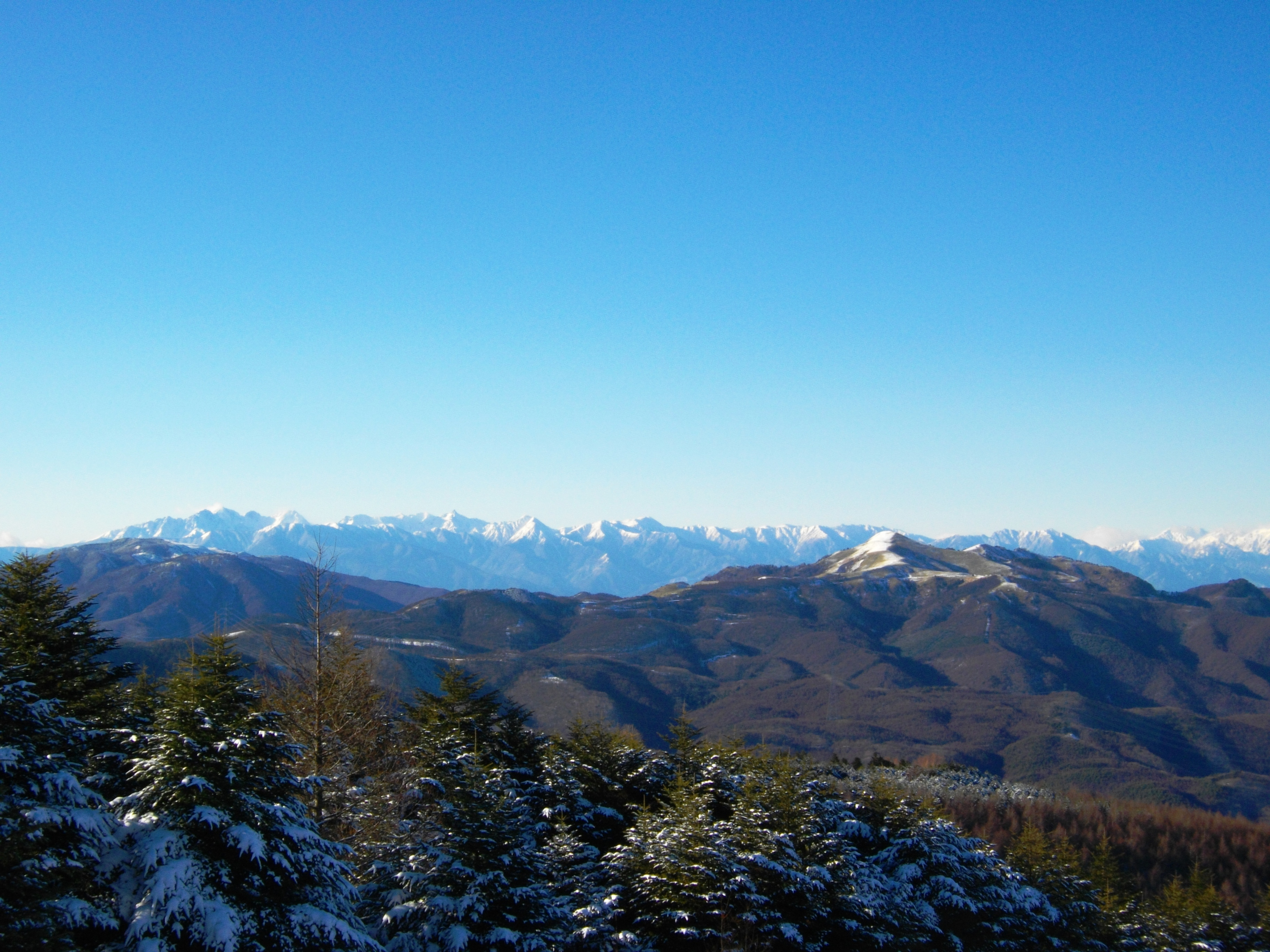
Hida Mountains from the top of Mount Ōsasa

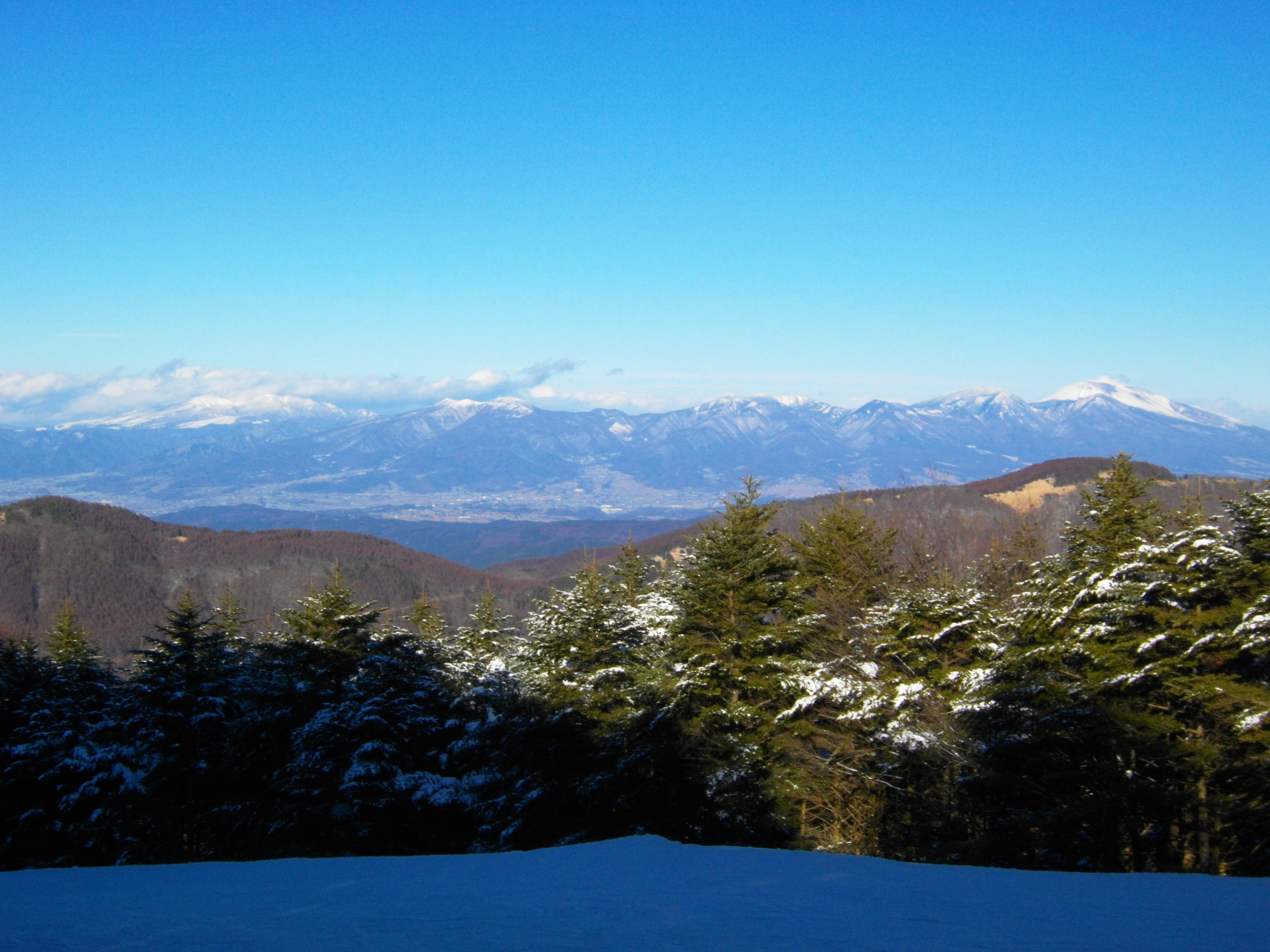
Asama Mountains from the top of Mount Ōsasa

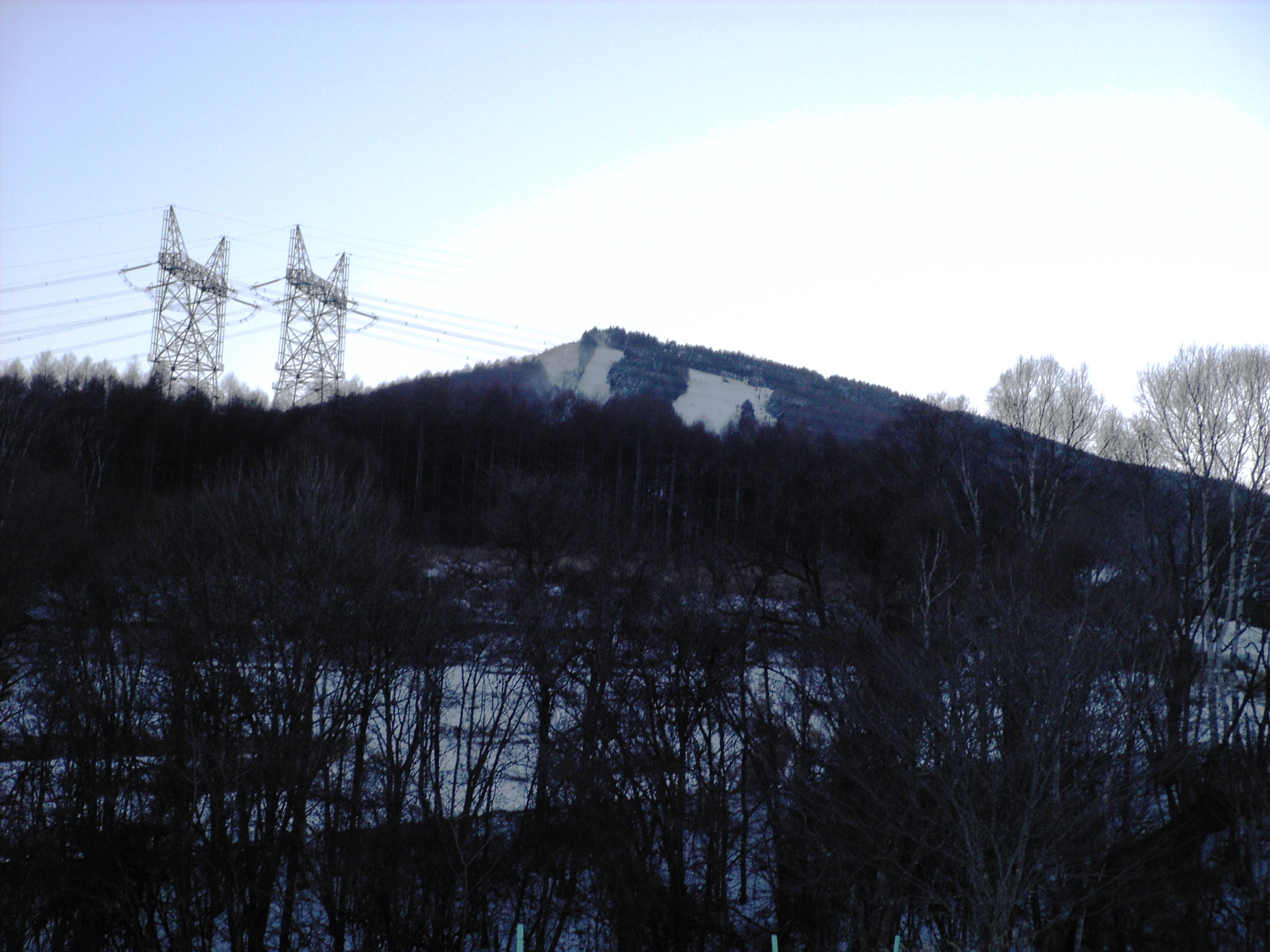
Mount Ōsasa from Takayama
