= Mount Kamuiekuuchikaushi =

Mountain in Japan

- カムイエクウチカウシ山
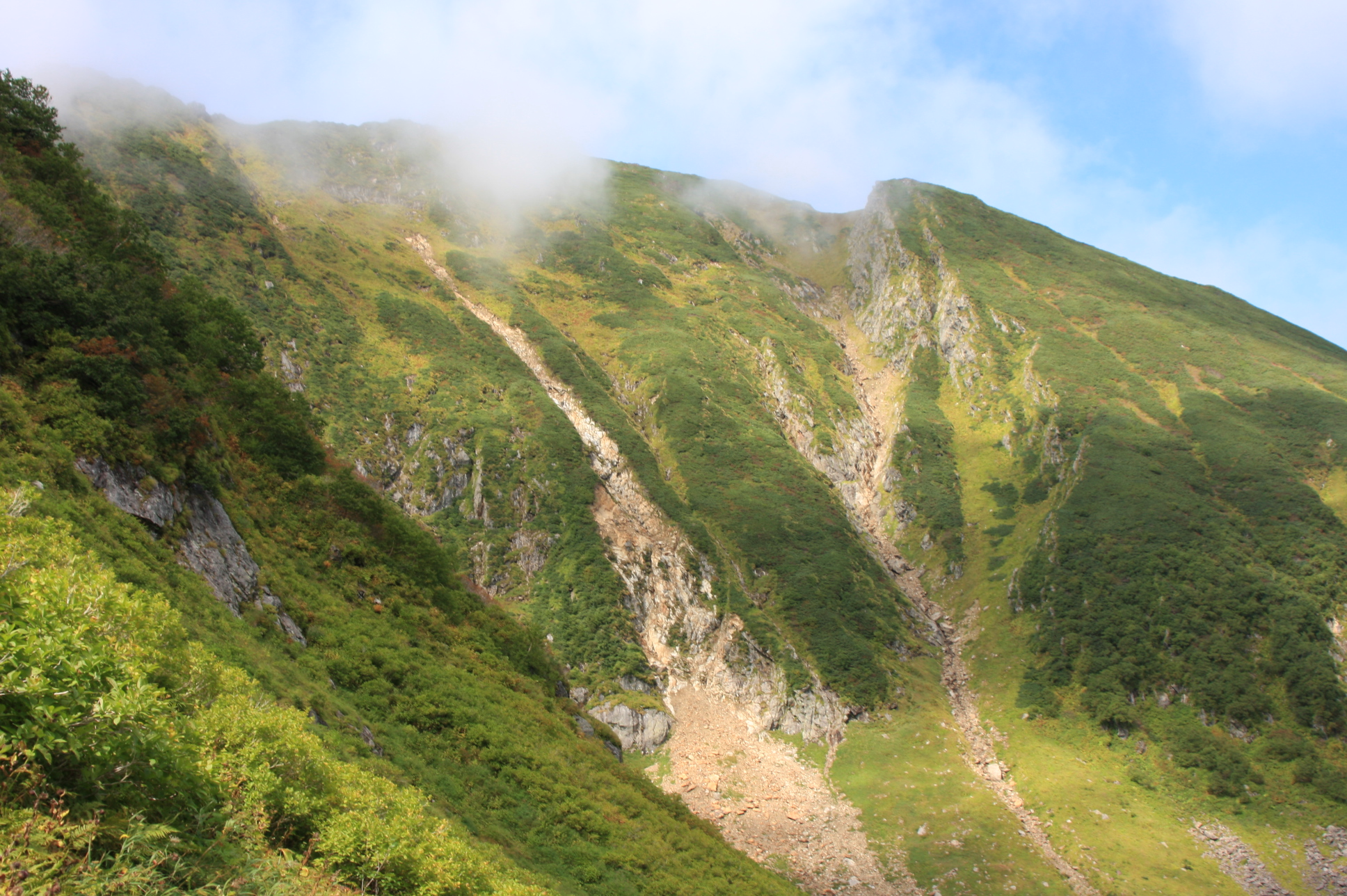
- A view from Mount Pyramid

Highest point
- Elevation: 1,979.5 m (6,494 ft)
- Prominence: 466 m (1,529 ft)
- Parent peak: Mount Poroshiri
- Listing: List of mountains and hills of Japan by height
- Coordinates: 42°37′30″N 142°45′59″E

Geography
- Location within Japan
- Location: Hokkaidō, Japan
- Parent range: Hidaka Mountains
- Topo map(s): Geospatial Information Authority (国土地理院, Kokudochiriin) 25000:1 札内川上流; 50000:1 浦河

Geology
- Mountain type: Fold

Mount Kamuiekuuchikaushi (カムイエクウチカウシ山, Kamuiekuuchikaushi-yama) is located in the Hidaka Mountains, Hokkaidō, Japan. It's one of the 200 Famous Japanese Mountains. The name is derived from Ainu languages which means "the mountain which bears/gods tumble down." Climbers generally abbreviate it as Kamueku.

It's the second highest peak only to the Mount Poroshiri in the Hidaka mountains, and its altitude is 1,979 m (6,493 ft) above sea level. The mountain is situated in the Hidaka-sanmyaku Erimo Quasi-National Park, and Triangulation station has been set up in the peak by Masaki Terunobu (正木照信) in 1900. A peak a little south east to the mountain is Pyramid peak (ピラミッド峰) which is 1,853 m (6,079 ft) above sea level shaped like a square pyramid, so that the Mount Kamuiekuuchikaushi can be the best viewing platform for the peak.

== Etymology ==
The name is derived from Ainu languages which means "the mountain which bears/gods tumble down." However Ainu people who worship bears as gods are not the one who gave it the name. Originally the mountain was called Satsunai mountain (札内岳). In 1929, Ito Shugoro and others from Hokkaido University built a hut at a "place" called Kamuiekuuchikau which located upstream of Tottabetsu river as a preparation for attacking the Mount Poroshiri. At that time a guide mistakenly told them the name of place as the mountain where they were, and thus the name has been stuck.

== Geography ==
As the name indicates, the mountain is steep, and has cirques just like other lofty peaks in the Hidaka Mountains; containing Hachi no sawa Cirque (八ノ沢カール) in Tokachi Subprefecture side and Koiboku Cirque (コイボクカール) in Hidaka Subprefecture side. There also lie Moraines in downstream of those cirques. Those cirques in the Hidaka Mountains are smaller than ones in Hida Mountains region. The reason could be because in Ice age, around 20,000 years ago, snowfall was less when Japanese archipelago was connected to the continent by land and thus warm sea current, Tsushima Current was blocked from getting into Sea of Japan.

== See also ==
- Hidaka Mountains
- Mount Satsunai (1,896m)
- Mount Tokachiporoshiri (1,846m)
- Hidaka-sanmyaku Erimo Quasi-National Park
- 200 Famous Japanese Mountains
- Shizunai River
