= Mount Nishuomanai =

Mountain in Hokkaido, Japan

- ニシュオマナイ岳
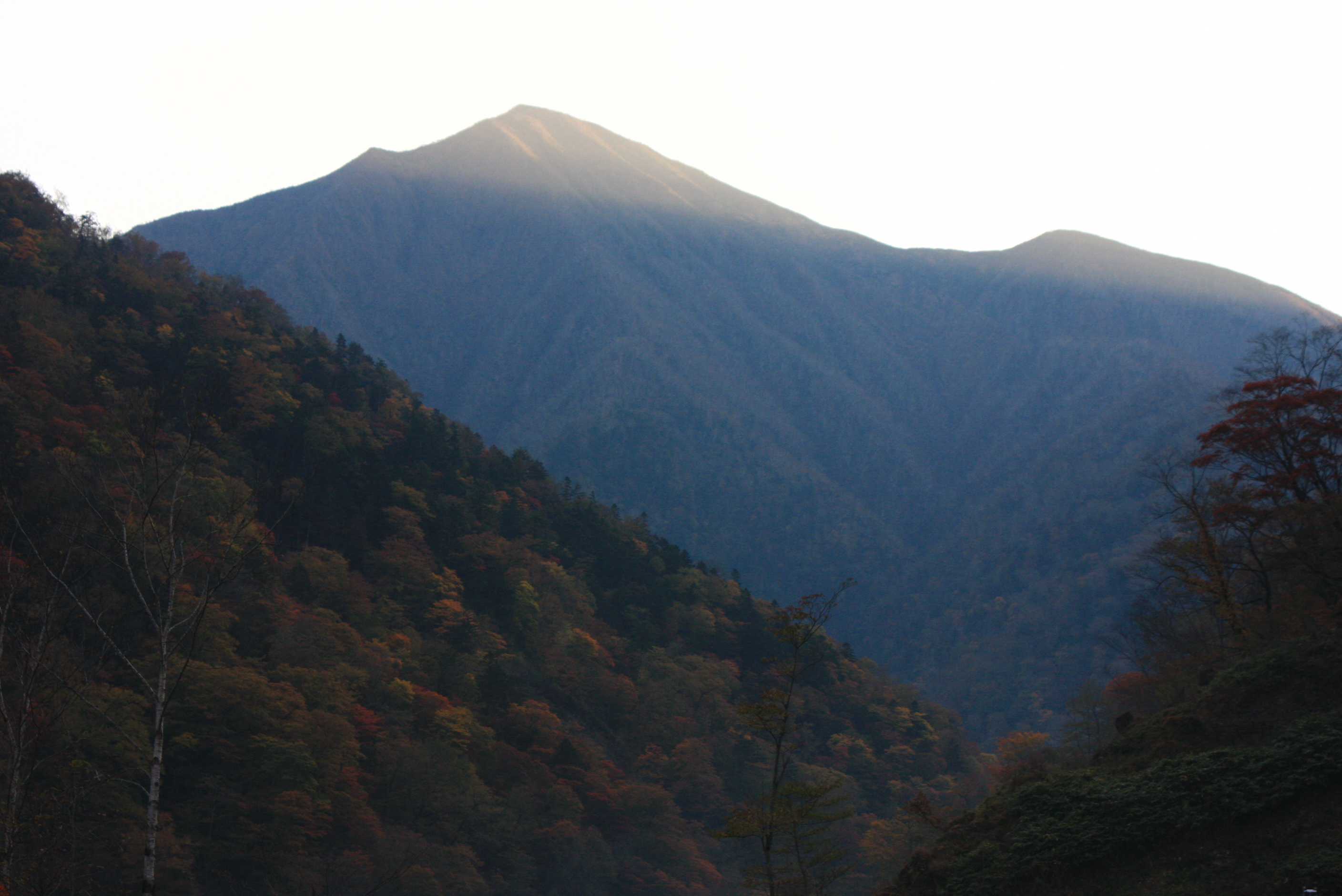

Highest point
- Elevation: 1,493 m (4,898 ft)
- Listing: Mountains and hills of Japan
- Coordinates: 42°27′00″N 142°53′48″E

Geography
- Location within Japan
- Location: hokkaido, Japan
- Parent range: Hidaka Mountains

Mount Nishuomanai (ニシュオマナイ岳, Nishuomanai-Dake) is located between Mount Kamui (Urakawa-Hiroo) and Mount Nakano in the Hidaka Mountains, Hokkaidō, Japan. The mountain's name is believed to mean "Mortar Stream" in the Ainu language.
