= Mount Toyoni =

Mount Toyoni may refer to:

- Mount Toyoni (Urakawa-Hiroo) is a mountain in the Hidaka Mountains on the border between Urakawa and Hiroo in Hokkaidō
- Mount Toyoni (Erimo) is a mountain in the Hidaka Mountains in Erimo, Hokkaidō
