= Pirika Nupuri =

Mountain in Japan

- ピリカヌプリ
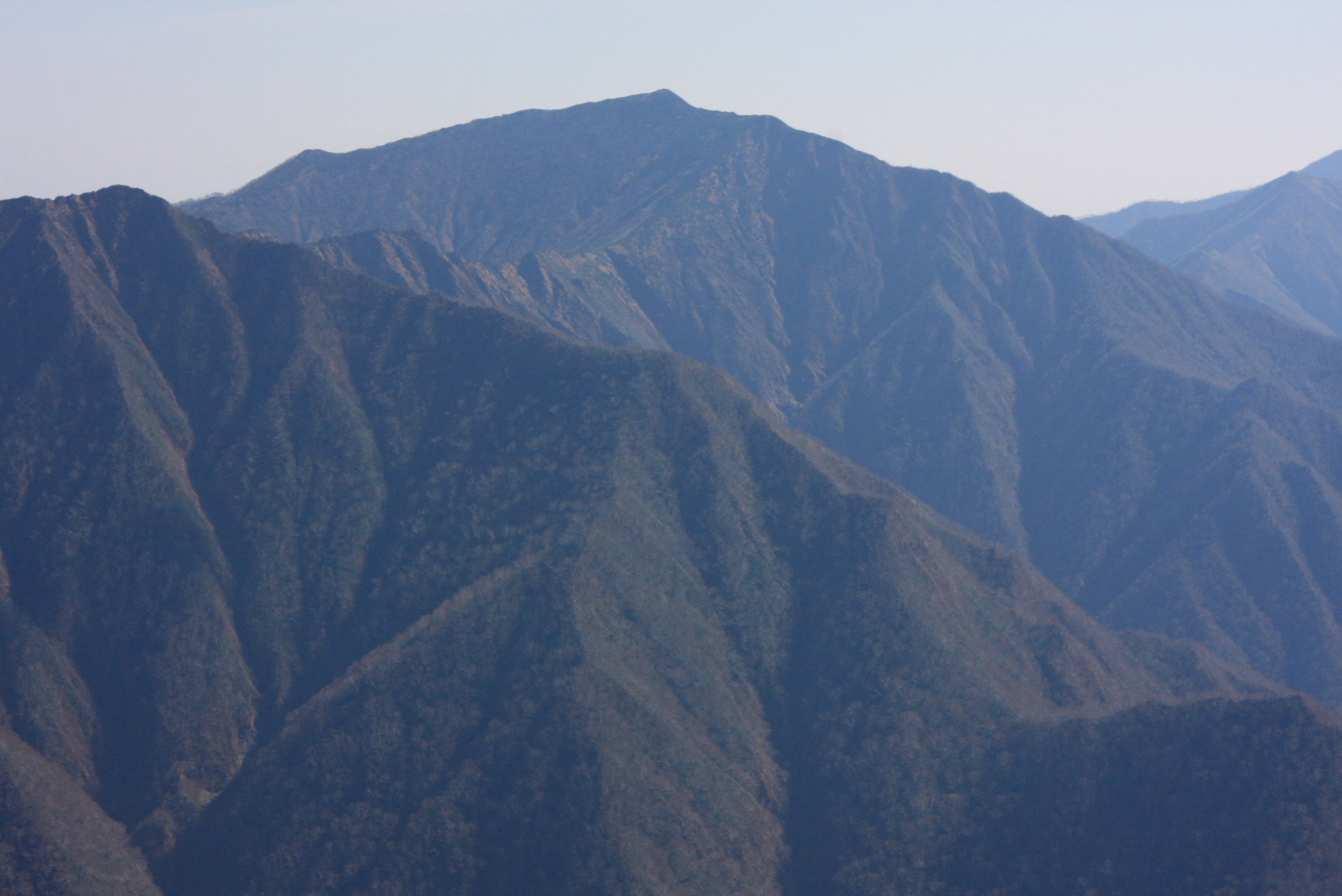
- A view from Mount Kamui

Highest point
- Elevation: 1,630.8 m (5,350 ft)
- Prominence: 470 m (1,540 ft)
- Parent peak: Mount Petegari
- Listing: List of mountains and hills of Japan by height
- Coordinates: 42°24′08″N 142°58′00″E

Naming
- English translation: good mountain
- Language of name: Ainu language
- Pronunciation: Ainu pronunciation: [piɾkanupuɾi]

Geography
- Location within Japan
- Location: Hokkaidō, Japan
- Parent range: Hidaka Mountains
- Topo map(s): Geospatial Information Authority (国土地理院, Kokudochiriin) 25000:1 ピリカヌプリ; 50000:1 浦河

Geology
- Mountain type: Fold

Pirika Nupuri (ピリカヌプリ, Pirika-nupuri) is a mountain located in the Hidaka Mountains, Hokkaidō, Japan.
