= Mount Nukabira =

Mountain in Hokkaido, Japan

- ヌカビラ岳

Highest point
- Elevation: 1,807.9 m (5,931 ft)
- Prominence: 7.9 m (26 ft)
- Parent peak: Mount Kitatottabetsu
- Listing: List of mountains and hills of Japan by height
- Coordinates: 42°45′5″N 142°40′28″E

Geography
- Location: Hokkaidō, Japan
- Parent range: Hidaka Mountains
- Topo map(s): Geographical Survey Institute (国土地理院, Kokudochiriin) 50000:1 幌尻岳, 25000:1 ピパイロ岳, 25000:1 幌尻岳

Geology
- Mountain type: Fold

Mount Nukabira (ヌカビラ岳, Nukabira-dake) is located in the Hidaka Mountains, Hokkaidō, Japan. This peak shares its name with the nearby Nukabira River (額平川, Nukabira-gawa).
