= Mount Tomuraushi =

Mount Tomuraushi may refer to:

- Mount Tomuraushi (Daisetsuzan), in Daisetsuzan National Park in Hokkaidō
- Mount Tomuraushi (Hidaka), in the Hidaka Mountains of Hokkaido
