= Mount Pisenai =

Mountain in Hokkaido, Japan

- ピセナイ山
- Location within Japan

Highest point
- Elevation: 1,027.4 m (3,371 ft)
- Prominence: 586 m (1,923 ft)
- Parent peak: Mount Pirigai
- Listing: List of mountains and hills of Japan by height
- Coordinates: 42°24′49″N 142°38′16″E

Geography
- Location: Hokkaidō, Japan
- Parent range: Hidaka Mountains
- Topo map(s): Geospatial Information Authority (国土地理院, Kokudochiriin) 25000:1 セタウシ山; 25000:1ペラリ山; 25000:1 美河; 25000:1 農屋; 50000:1 浦河

Geology
- Mountain type: Fold

Mount Pisenai (ピセナイ山, Pisenai-yama) is located in the Hidaka Mountains, Hokkaidō, Japan.
