= Nakano Summit =

Mount Nakano
- 中ノ峰

Highest point
- Elevation: 1,341.4 m (4,401 ft)
- Prominence: 63.4 m (208 ft)
- Parent peak: Mount Idonmappu
- Listing: List of mountains and hills of Japan by height
- Coordinates: 42°37′4″N 142°41′33″E

Naming
- English translation: middle summit
- Language of name: Japanese

Geography
- Location: Hokkaidō, Japan
- Parent range: Hidaka Mountains
- Topo map(s): Geographical Survey Institute (国土地理院, Kokudochiriin) 25000:1 イドンナップ岳, 50000:1 イドンナップ岳

Geology
- Mountain type: Fold

Nakano Summit (中ノ峰, Nakano-hō) is located in the Hidaka Mountains, Hokkaidō, Japan.
