= Cannon Mountain =

Cannon Mountain or Mount Cannon may refer to the following mountains in the United States:

- Cannon Mountain (New Hampshire) 4,080 feet (1,240 m)
  - Cannon Mountain Ski Area, a ski resort on that mountain
- Cannon Mountain (Washington) 8,638 feet (2,633 m)
- Mount Cannon, Montana 8,956 feet (2,730 m)

== See also ==
- Mount Kannon, Hokkaido, Japan
- Mount Kannon, a peak of Mount Hōō in Honshū, Japan
