= Mount Yoko =

Mount Yoko may refer to:

- Mount Yoko (Hidaka), in Shinhidaka, Hokkaidō
- Mount Yoko (Northern Yatsugatake), in the Northern Yatsugatake Volcanic Group of the Yatsugatake Mountains on Honshū
- Mount Yoko (Southern Yatsugatake), in the Southern Yatsugatake Volcanic Group of the Yatsugatake Mountains on Honshū
