= Pinneshiri =

Pinneshiri (ピンネシリ, Pinneshiri) may refer to one of the following mountains in Japan:

- Pinneshiri (Hidaka), a mountain of the Hidaka mountains in Samani, Hokkaidō
- Pinneshiri (Kabato), a mountain of the Kabato mountains in Shintokukawa, Hokkaidō
