= Mount Soematsu =

Mountain in Hokkaido, Japan

- ソエマツ岳
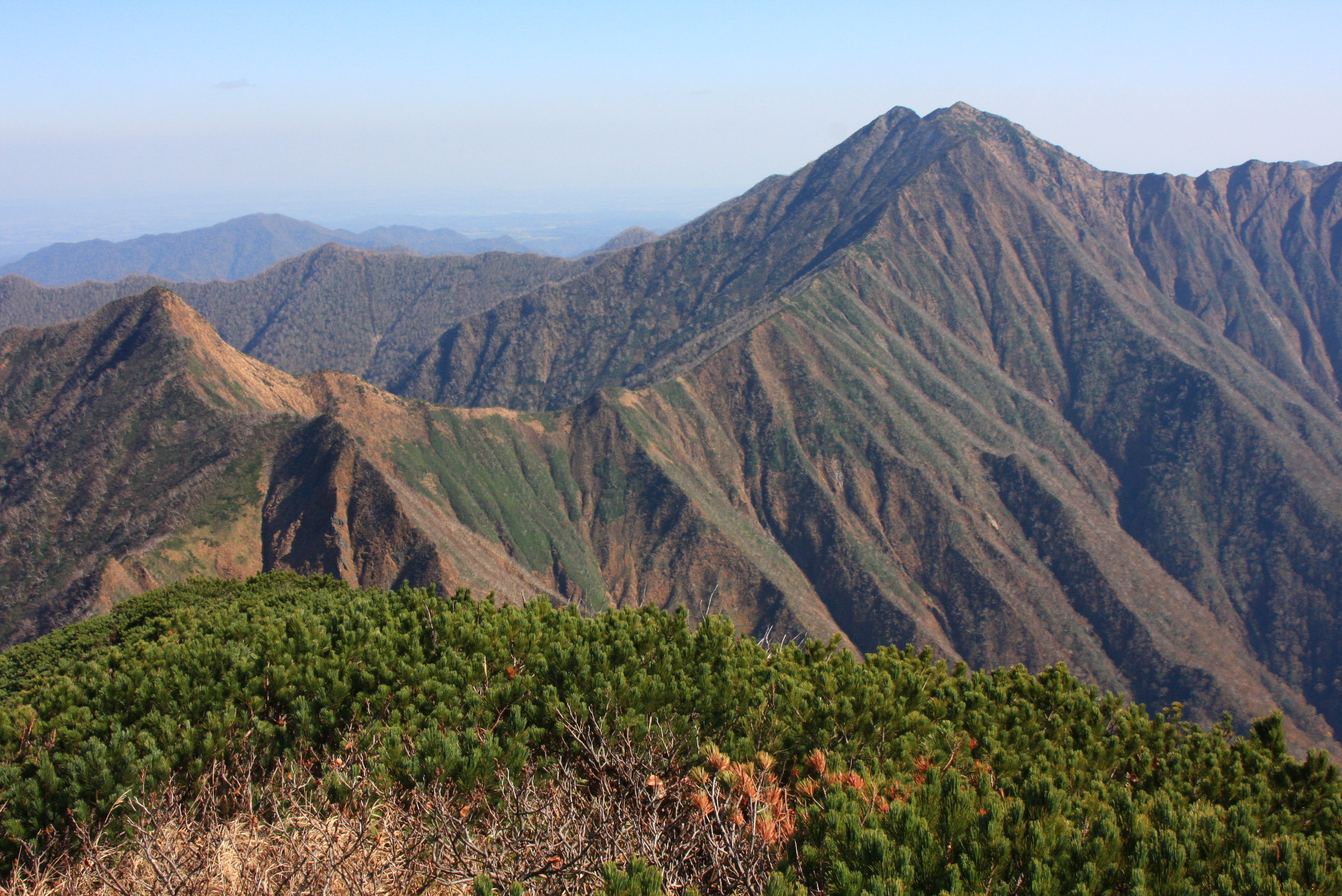
- A view from Mount Kamui

Highest point
- Elevation: 1,625 m (5,331 ft)
- Listing: List of mountains and hills of Japan by height
- Coordinates: 42°25′38″N 142°56′49″E

Geography
- Location: Hokkaidō, Japan
- Parent range: Hidaka Mountains
- Topo map(s): Geographical Survey Institute (国土地理院, Kokudochiriin) 25000:1 神威岳, 50000:1 神威岳

Geology
- Mountain type: Fold

Mount Soematsu (ソエマツ岳, Soematsu-dake) is located in the Hidaka Mountains, Hokkaidō, Japan.
