= Mount Tokachi =

Mount Tokachi may refer to:

- Mount Tokachi (Daisetsuzan), a volcano in Daisetsuzan National Park, central Hokkaidō, Japan
- Mount Tokachi (Hidaka), a mountain in the Hidaka Mountains of eastern Hokkaidō, Japan
