= Mount Oshiki =

Mountain in Hokkaido, Japan

- 妙敷山

Highest point
- Elevation: 1,731.3 m (5,680 ft)
- Prominence: 180 m (590 ft)
- Parent peak: Mount Fushimi
- Listing: List of mountains and hills of Japan by height
- Coordinates: 42°45′49″N 142°46′56″E

Geography
- Location: Hokkaidō, Japan
- Parent range: Hidaka Mountains
- Topo map(s): Geographical Survey Institute (国土地理院, Kokudochiriin) 50000:1 札内岳, 25000:1 妙敷山

Geology
- Mountain type: Fold

Mount Oshiki (妙敷山, oshikisan) is located in the Hidaka Mountains, Hokkaidō, Japan.
