= Kamitaki =

Kamitaki may refer to:

- Mount Kamitaki, a mountain in the Hidaka Mountains, Hokkaidō, Japan
- 22736 Kamitaki (1998 SM137), a main-belt asteroid
- Nolan Kamitaki, winner of the 2006 Discovery Channel Young Scientist Challenge
