= 1839 Metre Summit =

Mountain in the Hidaka Mountain range, Hokkaidō, Japan

- 1839峰
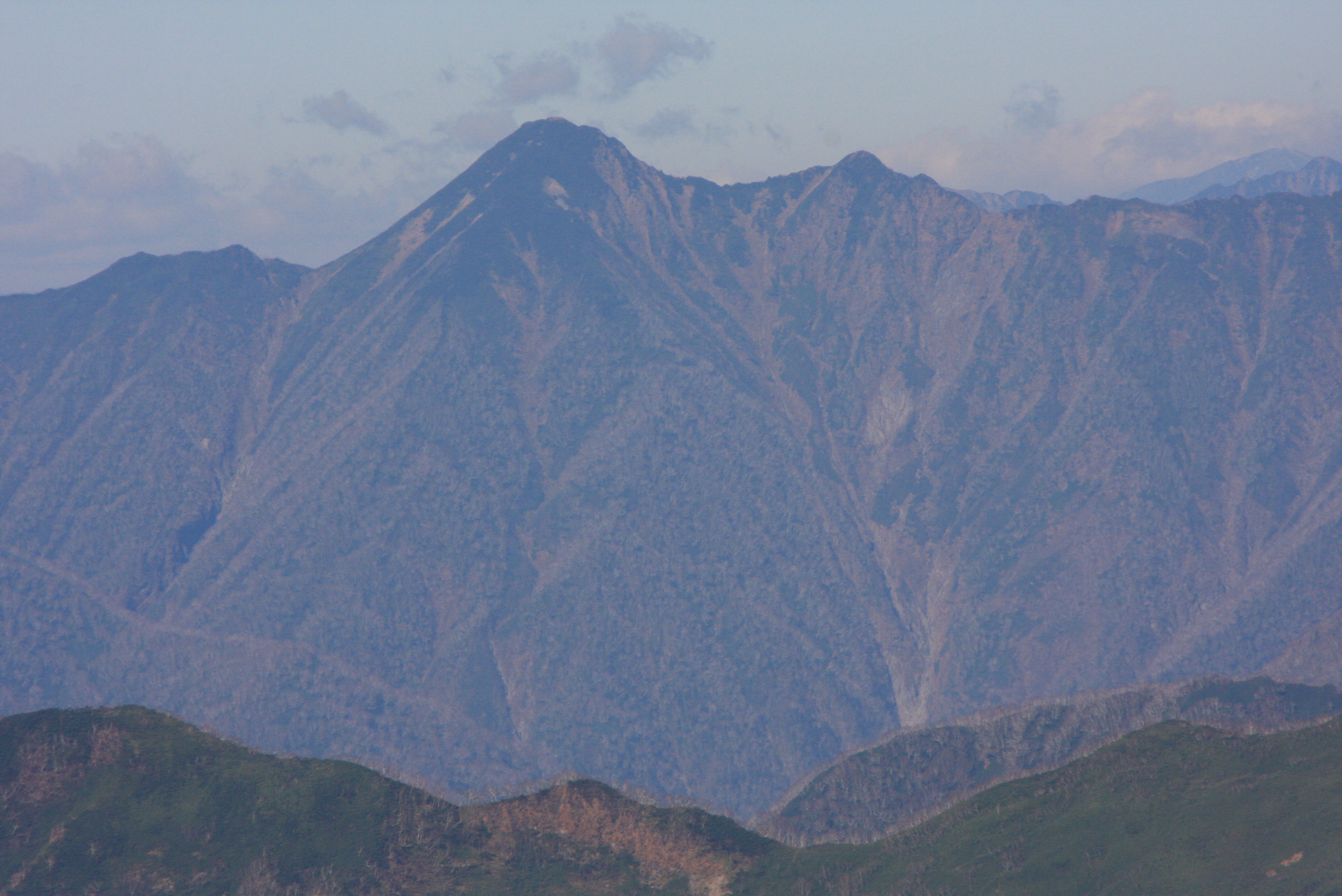
- A view from Mount Kamui

Highest point
- Elevation: 1,842 m (6,043 ft)
- Listing: List of mountains and hills of Japan by height
- Coordinates: 42°32′22″N 142°48′29″E

Naming
- English translation: 1839 metre summit
- Language of name: Japanese

Geography
- Location within Japan
- Location: Hokkaidō, Japan
- Parent range: Hidaka Mountains
- Topo map(s): Geographical Survey Institute (国土地理院, Kokudochiriin) 25000:1 ヤオロマップ岳

Geology
- Mountain type: Fold

1839 Metre Summit (1839峰, Ippasankyu-mētoru-hō) is located in the Hidaka Mountains, Hokkaidō, Japan. It is 1,842 metres (6,043 ft) above sea level.
