= Mount Shunbetsu =

- 春別岳

Highest point
- Elevation: 1,491.8 m (4,894 ft)
- Listing: List of mountains and hills of Japan by height
- Coordinates: 42°50′8″N 142°37′28″E

Geography
- Location: Hokkaidō, Japan
- Parent range: Hidaka Mountains
- Topo map(s): Geographical Survey Institute (国土地理院, Kokudochiriin) 25000:1 二岐岳

Geology
- Mountain type: Fold

Mount Shunbetsu (春別岳, Shunbetsu-dake) is located in the Hidaka Mountains, Hokkaidō, Japan.
