= Mount Koikakushusatsunai =

Mountain in Hokkaido, Japan

- コイカクシュサツナイ岳

Highest point
- Elevation: 1,721 m (5,646 ft)
- Listing: List of mountains and hills of Japan by height
- Coordinates: 42°34′14″N 142°49′29″E

Geography
- Location: Hokkaidō, Japan
- Parent range: Hidaka Mountains
- Topo map(s): Geographical Survey Institute (国土地理院, Kokudochiriin) 25000:1 ヤオロマップ岳

Geology
- Mountain type: Fold

Mount Koikakushusatsunai (コイカクシュサツナイ岳, Koikakushusatsunai-dake) is located in the Hidaka Mountains, Hokkaidō, Japan. It stands at 1721m elevation, and it is the 24th highest mountain in the Hidaka Mountains.
