= Hidaka Mountains =

Mountain range in Hokkaido, Japan

- 日高山脈
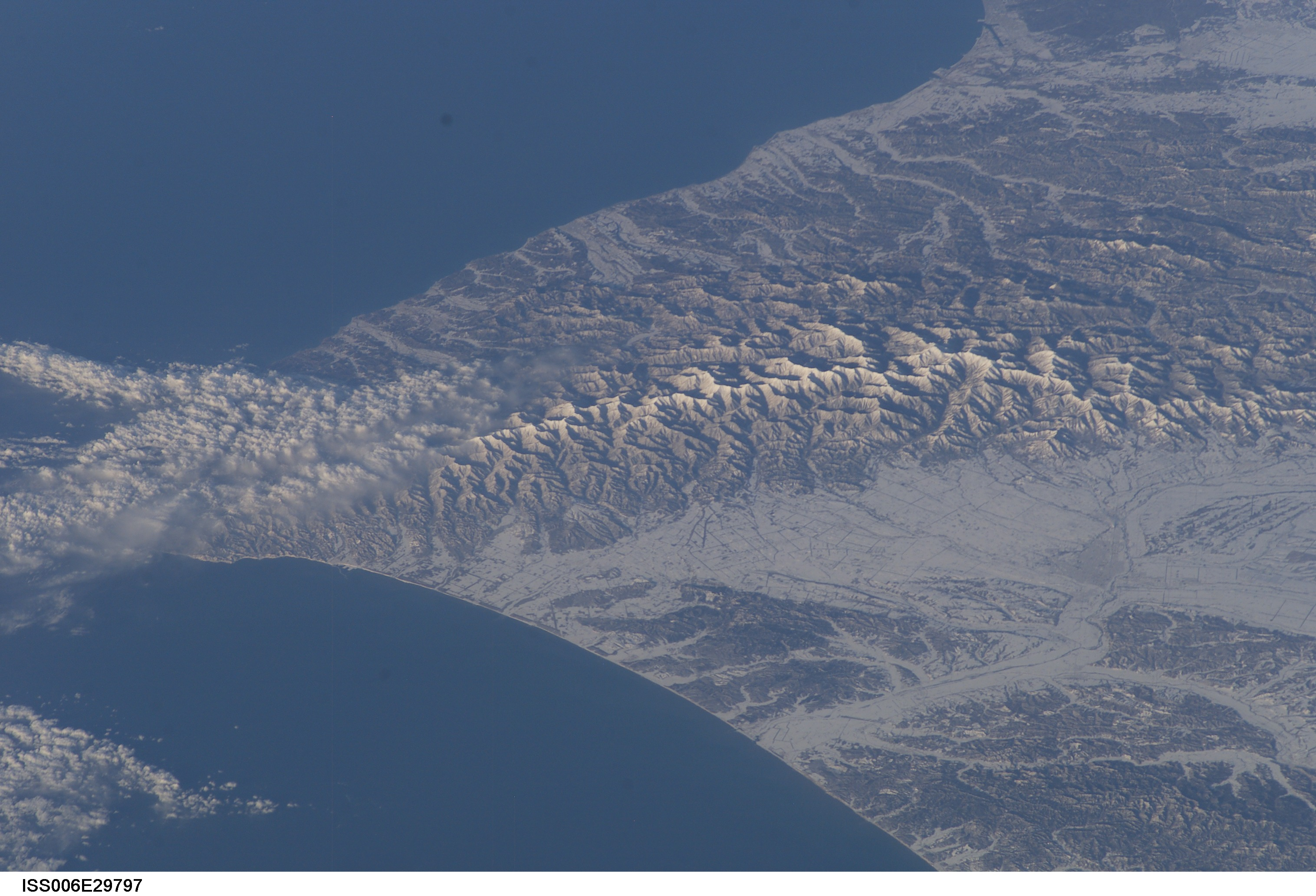
- Mountains, taken from the ISS on Feb. 22, 2003

Highest point
- Peak: Mount Poroshiri
- Elevation: 2,052.8 m (6,735 ft)
- Coordinates: 42°43′9″N 142°40′58″E

Dimensions
- Length: 150 km (93 mi) north to south

Naming
- Etymology: sun high (sunrise)
- Native name: 日高山脈 (Japanese); Hidaka-sanmyaku (Japanese)

Geography
- Location within Japan
- Country: Japan
- State: Hokkaidō
- Subprefectures: Hidaka; Tokachi
- Districts: Hidaka; Hiroo; Horoizumi; Kamikawa; Kasai; Niikappu; Samani; Saru; Urakawa
- Municipality: Obihiro
- Range coordinates: 43°8.7′N 142°59.2′E
- Biome: alpine climate

Geology
- Rock age: late Quaternary
- Rock type: Fold (geology)

The Hidaka Mountains (日高山脈, Hidaka-sanmyaku) are a mountain range in southeastern Hokkaido, Japan. It runs 150 km (93 mi) from Mount Sahoro or Karikachi Pass in central Hokkaidō south, running into the sea at Cape Erimo. It consists of folded mountains that range from 1,500 to 2,000 m (4,921 to 6,562 ft) in height. Mount Poroshiri is the highest at 2,053 m (6,736 ft). The Hidaka Mountains separate the subprefectures of Hidaka and Tokachi. Most of the range lies in the Hidakasanmyaku-Erimo-Tokachi National Park (日高山脈襟裳十勝国立公園, Hidaka-sanmyaku-Erimo-Tokachi Kokuritsu-kōen). Since the mountain range lies so far north, the alpine climate zone lies at a lower altitude.

== Geology ==
The Hidaka Mountains formed in the late Quaternary as part of the outer arc of the western end of the Kuril Island Arc. They were formed by the uplift resulting from the collision with the Kuril arc and the Northeast Japan Arc. The Hidaka mountains no longer appear to be uplifting.

The western end of the range is high P/T metamorphoseed Jurassic accretionary complex as part of the Kamuikotan belt. This is characterized by sedimentary rocks from the Cretaceous and Jurassic-Lower Cretaceous periods. The eastern end of the range is tertiary metamorphic rock as part of the Hidaka Metamorphic belt. This is characterized by low to medium pressure metamorphic rocks with sedimentary rocks from the Cretaceous-Lower Miocene. Plutonic rocks intrude into these structures. For the most part, the Hidaka mountains are composed of schists, migmatites, gneisses, and granites.

== Glaciation ==
The Hidaka mountains are the only mountains in Hokkaido to show evidence of glaciation. This occurs above 1,400 metres (4,600 ft), where one can find moraines and more than 20 cirques from Mount Kitatottabetsu in the north to Mount Toyoni in the south.

== Flora and fauna ==
Flora and fauna
- Plants: Callianthemum miyabeanum
- Animals: Brown Bear; Sika Deer; Northern Pika

Mount Apoi is known for endemic alpine plant life, such as Callianthemum miyabeanum (ヒダカソウ, Hidaka-sō). The Hidaka Mountains are also one of the last refuges of the Hokkaido bear (Ursus arctos yesoensis) and Hokkaido deer (Cervus nippon yesoensis).

The mountains can be divided into four zones. The topmost zone (1,400–1,600 m) is colonized by Siberian dwarf pine and other alpine flora. From 1,200 to 1,300 m is occupied by Betula ermanii. The zone above 500 m is occupied by Picea jezoensis and Abies sachalinensis along with broad-leafed trees. The lowest zone below 500 m is occupied by broad-leafed trees, including Quercus mongolica, Acer pictum subsp. mono and Cercidiphyllum japonicum.

Resident bird species include hazel grouse, black woodpecker, great spotted woodpecker, white-backed woodpecker, goldcrest, Eurasian treecreeper, and spotted nutcracker. Summer visitors to the Hidaka Mountains include Japanese accentor, Siberian blue robin, Japanese robin, red-flanked bluetail, Siberian thrush, Eastern crowned warbler, narcissus flycatcher, blue-and-white flycatcher, dark-sided flycatcher, grey bunting, and Eurasian bullfinch. Notable bird species that transit the Hidaka mountains are Arctic warbler and eyebrowed thrush.

== List of passes and tunnels ==
The major passes and tunnels through the Hidaka Mountains are as follows:

- Hidaka Pass
- Karikachi Pass
- Nisshō Pass and tunnel
- Nozuka pass and tunnel

== List of peaks by height ==
Mountains of the Hidaka range in order of elevation:

Name	Height
Mount Poroshiri (幌尻岳, Poroshiri-dake)	2,052.8 metres (6,734.9 ft)
Mount Kamuiekuuchikaushi (カムイエクウチカウシ山, Kamuiekuuchikaushi-yama)	1,979.4 metres (6,494.1 ft)
Mount Tottabetsu (戸蔦別岳, Tottabetsu-dake)	1,959 metres (6,427 ft)
Mount Pipairo (ピパイロ岳, Pipairo-dake)	1,916.5 metres (6,287.7 ft)
Mount Kitatottabetsu (北戸蔦別岳, Kita-tottabetsu-dake)	1,912 metres (6,273 ft)
Mount Esaoman-Tottabetsu (エサオマントッタベツ岳, Esaoman Tottabetsu-dake)	1,902 metres (6,240 ft)
Mount Satsunai (札内岳, Satsunai-dake)	1,895.5 metres (6,218.8 ft)
Mount Chiroro (チロロ岳, Chiroro-dake)	1,879.9 metres (6,167.7 ft)
Mount Tokachiporoshiri (十勝幌尻岳, Tokachi-poroshiri-dake)	1,846.0 metres (6,056.4 ft)
1839 Metre Summit (1839m峰, Ippasankyu-mētoru-hō)	1,842 metres (6,043 ft)
Mount Nukabira (ヌカビラ岳, Nukabira-dake)	1,807.9 metres (5,931.4 ft)
Mount Namewakka (ナメワッカ岳, Namewakka-dake)	1,799.1 metres (5,902.6 ft)
Mount Yaoromappu (ヤオロマップ岳, Yaoromappu-dake)	1,794.3 metres (5,887 ft)
Mount Fushimi (伏美岳, Fushimi-dake)	1,792 metres (5,879 ft)
Mount Kamui (Niikappu-Kasai) (神威岳, Kamui-dake)	1,756.1 metres (5,761.5 ft)
Mount Memuro (芽室岳, Memuro-dake)	1,753.7 metres (5,753.6 ft)
Mount Idonmappu (イドンナップ岳, Idonmappu-dake)	1,752 metres (5,748 ft)
Mount Penkenūshi (ペンケヌーシ岳, Penkenūshi-dake)	1,750.1 metres (5,741.8 ft)
Mount Pankenūshi (パンケヌーシ岳, Pankenūshi-dake)	1,746 metres (5,728 ft)
Mount Rubeshibe (ルベシベ山, Rubeshibe-yama)	1,740.0 metres (5,708.7 ft)
Mount Petegari (ペテガリ岳, Petegari-dake)	1,736.2 metres (5,696.2 ft)
Mount Oshiki (妙敷山, Oshiki-san)	1,731.3 metres (5,680.1 ft)
Mount Rubetsune (ルベツネ山, Rubetsune-san)	1,727.3 metres (5,667.0 ft)
Mount Koikakushusatsunai (コイカクシュサツナイ岳, Koikakushusatsunai-dake)	1,721 metres (5,646 ft)
Pirika Nupuri (ピリカヌプリ, Pirika-nupuri)	1,630.8 metres (5,350.4 ft)
Mount Shikashinai (シカシナイ山, Shikashinai-yama)	1,627.9 metres (5,340.9 ft)
Mount Shibichari (シビチャリ山, Shibichari-san)	1,626.9 metres (5,337.6 ft)
Mount Soematsu (ソエマツ岳, Soematsu-dake)	1,625 metres (5,331 ft)
Mount Kamui (Urakawa-Hiroo) (神威岳, Kamui-dake)	1,600.5 metres (5,251.0 ft)
Mount Piratokomi (ピラトコミ山, Piratokomi-san)	1,587.7 metres (5,209.0 ft)
Mount Pekerebetsu (ペケレベ ツ岳, Pekerebetsu-dake)	1,532.0 metres (5,026.2 ft)
Mount Nakano (中ノ岳, Nakano-dake)	1,519 metres (4,984 ft)
Mount Iwanai (岩内岳, Iwanai-dake)	1,497.7 metres (4,913.7 ft)
Mount Nishuomanai (ニシュオマナイ岳, Nishuomanai-dake)	1,493 metres (4,898 ft)
Mount Toyoni (Urakawa-Hiroo) (トヨニ岳, Toyoni-dake)	1,493 metres (4,898 ft)
Mount Shunbetsu (春別岳, Shunbetsu-dake)	1,491.8 metres (4,894.4 ft)
Mount Tomuraushi (Hidaka) (トムラウシ山, Tomuraushi-san)	1,476.7 metres (4,844.8 ft)
Mount Rakko (楽古岳, Rakko-dake)	1,471.9 metres (4,829.1 ft)
Mount Tokachi (Hidaka) (十勝岳, Tokachi-dake)	1,457.2 metres (4,780.8 ft)
Mount Futamata (二股山, Futamata-yama)	1,437.9 metres (4,717.5 ft)
Mount Saru (沙流岳, Saru-dake)	1,422.0 metres (4,665 ft)
Mount Kyusan (久山岳, Kyusan-dake)	1,411.7 metres (4,631.6 ft)
Mount Ponyaoromappu (ポンヤオロマップ岳,, Ponyaoromappu-dake)	1,405.6 metres (4,611.5 ft)
Mount Omusha (双子山, Omusha-nupuri)	1,379 metres (4,524 ft)
Mount Nishikawa (西川岳, Nishikawa-dake)	1,362.0 metres (4,468.5 ft)
Mount Nozuka (野塚岳, Nozuka-dake)	1,353.2 metres (4,439.6 ft)
Mount Rutori (留取岳, Rutori-dake)	1,350.4 metres (4,430.4 ft)
Nakano Summit (中ノ峰, Nakano-hō)	1,341.4 metres (4,400.9 ft)
Mount Kamitaki (上滝山, Kamitaki-yama)	1,331 metres (4,367 ft)
Mount Karifuri (狩振岳, Karifuri-dake)	1,323.2 metres (4,341.2 ft)
Mount Beppirigai (ベッピリガイ山, Beppirigai-san)	1,307.7 metres (4,290.4 ft)
Mount Tomamu (トマム山, Tomamu-san)	1,239.3 metres (4,065.9 ft)
Mount Hiroo (広尾岳, Hiroo-dake)	1,231 metres (4,039 ft)
Mount Tsurugi (Hokkaidō) (剣山, Tsurugi-san)	1,205.1 metres (3,953.7 ft)
Mount Kumami (熊見山, Kumami-yama)	1,175 metres (3,855 ft)
Mount Pirigai (ピリガイ山, Pirigai-yama)	1,166.9 metres (3,828.4 ft)
Mount Toyoni (Erimo) (豊似岳, Toyoni-dake)	1,105.0 metres (3,625.3 ft)
Mount Odasshu (オダッシュ山, Odasshu-yama)	1,097.7 metres (3,601.4 ft)
Mount Obihiro (帯広岳, Obihiro-dake)	1,089.0 metres (3,572.8 ft)
Mount Sahoro (佐幌岳, Sahoro-dake)	1,059.5 metres (3,476.0 ft)
Mount Pisenai (ピセナイ山, Pisenai-yama)	1,027.4 metres (3,370.7 ft)
Mount Uchiichi (ウチイチ山, Uchiichi-yama)	1,021.7 metres (3,352.0 ft)
Pinneshiri (ピンネシリ, Pinneshiri)	958.2 metres (3,144 ft)
Mount Kannon (観音岳, Kannon-dake)	932 metres (3,058 ft)
Mount Okishimappu (オキシマップ山, Okishimappu-yama)	895 metres (2,936 ft)
Mount Hakamagoshi (袴腰山, Hakamagoshi-yama)	872.3 metres (2,861.9 ft)
Mount Apoi (アポイ岳, Apoi-dake)	810.6 metres (2,659.4 ft)
Mount Ruchishi (ルチシ山, Ruchishi-yama)	754 metres (2,474 ft)
Mount Yoko (横山, Yoko-yama)	725.3 metres (2,380 ft)
Mount Tengu (Samani) (天狗岳, Tengu-dake)	666 metres (2,185 ft)
Mount Daimaru (大丸山, Daimaru-yama)	271 metres (889 ft)
Mount Maru (Hiroo) (丸山, Maru-yama)	117.0 metres (383.9 ft)

== Bibliography ==
- Paul Hunt, Hiking in Japan: An Adventurer's Guide to the Mountain Trails, Tokyo, Kodansha International Ltd., 1988. ISBN 0-87011-893-5 and ISBN 4-7700-1393-0 C0075
- Shyun Umezawa, Yasuhiko Sugawara, and Jun Nakagawa, Hokkaidō Natsuyama Gaido 4: Hidaka Sanmyaku no Yamayama (北海道夏山ガイド4日高山脈の山やま), Sapporo, The Hokkaido Shimbun Press, 1991. ISBN 4-89363-605-7
