= Mount Shibichari =

- シビチャリ山

Highest point
- Elevation: 1,626.9 m (5,338 ft)
- Listing: List of mountains and hills of Japan by height
- Coordinates: 42°31′19″N 142°48′8″E

Geography
- Location: Hokkaidō, Japan
- Parent range: Hidaka Mountains
- Topo map(s): Geographical Survey Institute (国土地理院, Kokudochiriin) 25000:1 ヤオロマップ岳, 50000:1 札内川上流

Geology
- Mountain type: Fold

Mount Shibichari (シビチャリ山, Shibichari-san) is located in the Hidaka Mountains, Hokkaidō, Japan.
