= Mount Obihiro =

Mountain in Hokkaido, Japan

- 帯広岳

Highest point
- Elevation: 1,089.0 m (3,572.8 ft)
- Listing: List of mountains and hills of Japan by height
- Coordinates: 42°45′16″N 142°53′39″E

Geography
- Location: Hokkaidō, Japan
- Parent range: Hidaka Mountains
- Topo map(s): Geographical Survey Institute (国土地理院, Kokudochiriin) 25000:1 拓成, 25000:1 上美生, 50000:1 札内岳

Geology
- Mountain type: Fold

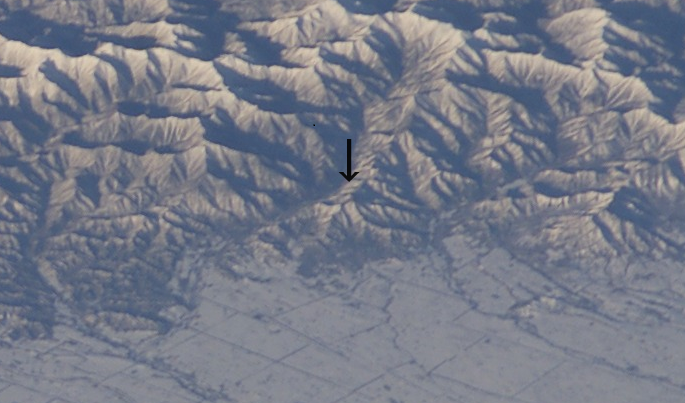
Mt. Obihirodake

Mount Obihiro (帯広岳, Obihiro-dake) is located in the Hidaka Mountains, Hokkaidō, Japan.

== See also ==
- List of mountains and hills of Japan by height
- Geography of Japan
