= Mount Penkenūshi =

- ペンケヌーシ岳

Highest point
- Elevation: 1,750.1 m (5,742 ft)
- Listing: List of mountains and hills of Japan by height
- Coordinates: 42°53′31″N 142°40′45″E

Geography
- Location: Hokkaidō, Japan
- Parent range: Hidaka Mountains
- Topo map(s): Geographical Survey Institute (国土地理院, Kokudochiriin) 50000:1 千栄, 25000:1 ペンケヌーシ岳

Geology
- Mountain type: Fold (geology)

Mount Penkenūshi (ペンケヌーシ岳, Penkenūshi-dake) is located in the Hidaka Mountains, Hokkaidō, Japan. It is the source of the Penkenūshi River (ペンケヌーシ川, Penkenūshi-gawa).

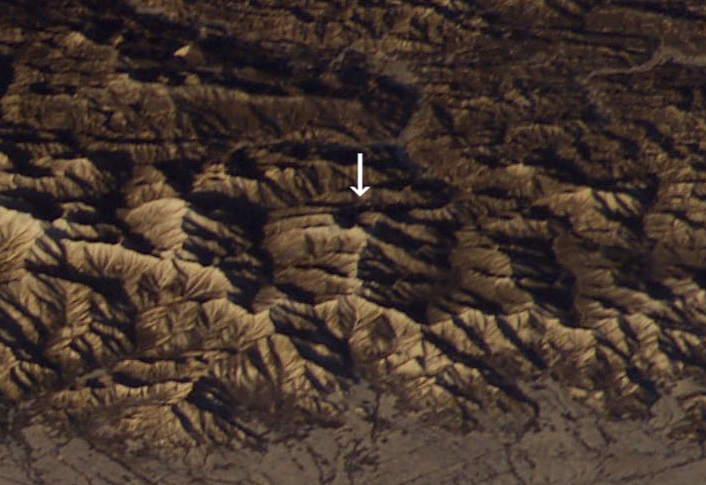
Mt. Penkenushi located on a satellite image
