= Mount Hiroo =

Mountain in Japan

- 広尾岳

Highest point
- Elevation: 1,231 m (4,039 ft)
- Listing: List of mountains and hills of Japan by height
- Coordinates: 42°13′54″N 143°10′53″E

Geography
- Location: Hokkaidō, Japan
- Parent range: Hidaka Mountains
- Topo map(s): Geographical Survey Institute (国土地理院, Kokudochiriin) 25000:1 広尾岳

Geology
- Mountain type: Fold

Mount Hiroo (広尾岳, Hiroo-dake) is located in the Hidaka Mountains, Hokkaidō, Japan.
