= Mount Pekerebetsu =

Mountain in Hokkaido, Japan

- ペケレベ ツ岳

Highest point
- Elevation: 1,532.0 m (5,026.2 ft)
- Listing: List of mountains and hills of Japan by height
- Coordinates: 42°56′33″N 142°45′33″E

Geography
- Location: Hokkaidō, Japan
- Parent range: Hidaka Mountains
- Topo map(s): Geographical Survey Institute (国土地理院, Kokudochiriin) 25000:1 十勝石山

Geology
- Mountain type: Fold (geology)

Mount Pekerebetsu (ペケレベ ツ岳, Pekerebetsu-dake) is located in the Hidaka Mountains, Hokkaidō, Japan. The Nisshō Pass route leads to the peak.
