= Mount Tomamu =

Mountain in Hokkaido, Japan

- トマム山

Highest point
- Elevation: 1,239.3 m (4,066 ft)
- Listing: List of mountains and hills of Japan by height
- Coordinates: 43°4′43″N 142°35′46″E

Geography
- Location: Hokkaidō, Japan
- Parent range: Hidaka Mountains
- Topo map(s): Geographical Survey Institute (国土地理院, Kokudochiriin) 25000:1 下トマム, 50000:1 落合

Geology
- Mountain type: Fold (geology)

Mount Tomamu (トマム山, Tomamu-san)

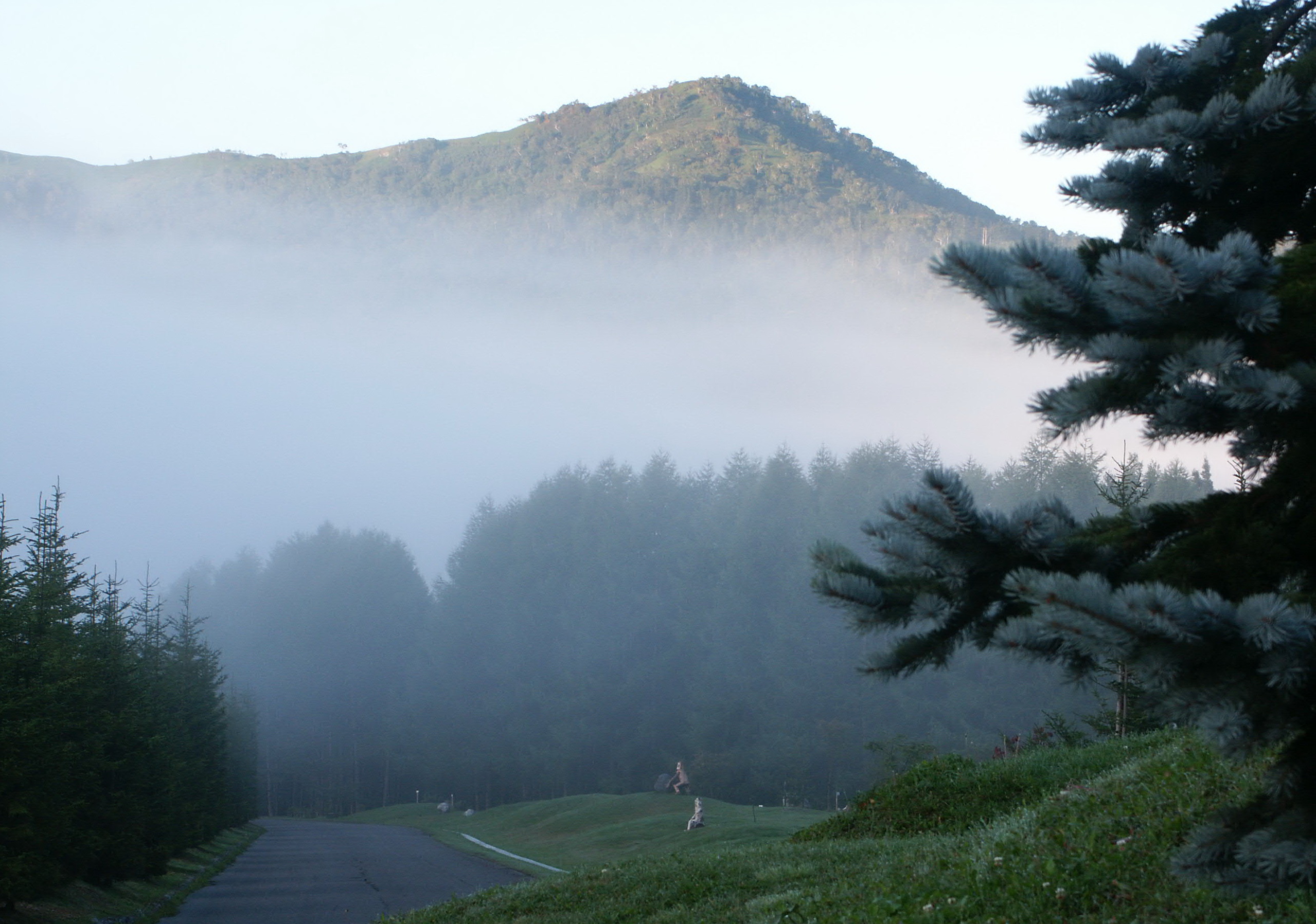
Mount Tomamu

is located in the Hidaka Mountains, Hokkaidō, Japan. It is the site of the Alpha Resort Tomamu, a ski resort.
