= Mount Saru =

Mountain in Japan

- 沙流岳

Highest point
- Elevation: 1,422.0 m (4,665.4 ft)
- Listing: List of mountains and hills of Japan by height
- Coordinates: 42°57′6″N 142°42′56″E

Geography
- Location: Hokkaidō, Japan
- Parent range: Hidaka Mountains
- Topo map(s): Geographical Survey Institute (国土地理院, Kokudochiriin) 25000:1 沙流岳, 50000:1 千栄

Geology
- Mountain type: Fold

Mount Saru (沙流岳, Saru-dake) is located in the Hidaka Mountains, Hokkaidō, Japan.
