= Mount Kamui (Niikappu-Kasai) =

Mountain in Japan

Highest point
- Elevation: 1,756.1 m (5,761 ft)
- Listing: List of mountains and hills of Japan by height
- Coordinates: 42°43′28″N 142°44′55″E

Naming
- Native name: 神威岳 (Ainu)
- English translation: Mountain of the Gods

Geography
- Location: Hokkaidō, Japan
- Parent range: Hidaka Mountains
- Topo map(s): Geographical Survey Institute (国土地理院, Kokudochiriin) 25000:1 札内岳

Geology
- Mountain type: Fold

Mount Kamui (神威岳 (Ainu), kamuidake) is located in the Hidaka Mountains, Hokkaidō, Japan.
