= Mount Uchiichi =

Mountain in Hokkaidō, Japan

- ウチイチ山

Highest point
- Elevation: 1,021.7 m (3,352 ft)
- Listing: List of mountains and hills of Japan by height
- Coordinates: 42°27′52″N 142°47′34″E

Geography
- Location: Hokkaidō, Japan
- Parent range: Hidaka Mountains
- Topo map(s): Geographical Survey Institute (国土地理院, Kokudochiriin) 25000:1 ピリガイ山, 50000:1 神威岳

Geology
- Mountain type: Fold

Mount Uchiichi (ウチイチ山, Uchiichi-yama) is located in the Hidaka Mountains, Hokkaidō, Japan.
