= Mount Rutori =

Mountain in Hokkaidō, Japan

- 留取岳

Highest point
- Elevation: 1,350.4 m (4,430 ft)
- Listing: List of mountains and hills of Japan by height
- Coordinates: 42°28′57″N 142°56′8″E

Geography
- Location: Hokkaidō, Japan
- Parent range: Hidaka Mountains
- Topo map(s): Geographical Survey Institute (国土地理院, Kokudochiriin) 25000:1 神威岳, 50000:1 神威岳

Geology
- Mountain type: Fold

Mount Rutori (留取岳, Rutori-dake) is located in the Hidaka Mountains, Hokkaidō, Japan.
