= Mount Kyusan =

Mountain in Hokkaido, Japan

- 久山岳

Highest point
- Elevation: 1,411.7 m (4,632 ft)
- Listing: List of mountains and hills of Japan by height
- Coordinates: 42°51′47″N 142°49′50″E

Geography
- Location: Hokkaidō, Japan
- Parent range: Hidaka Mountains
- Topo map(s): Geographical Survey Institute (国土地理院, Kokudochiriin) 25000:1 芽室岳

Geology
- Mountain type: Fold

Mount Kyusan (久山岳, Kyusan-dake) is located in the Hidaka Mountains, Hokkaidō, Japan.
