= Mount Satsunai =

- 札内岳
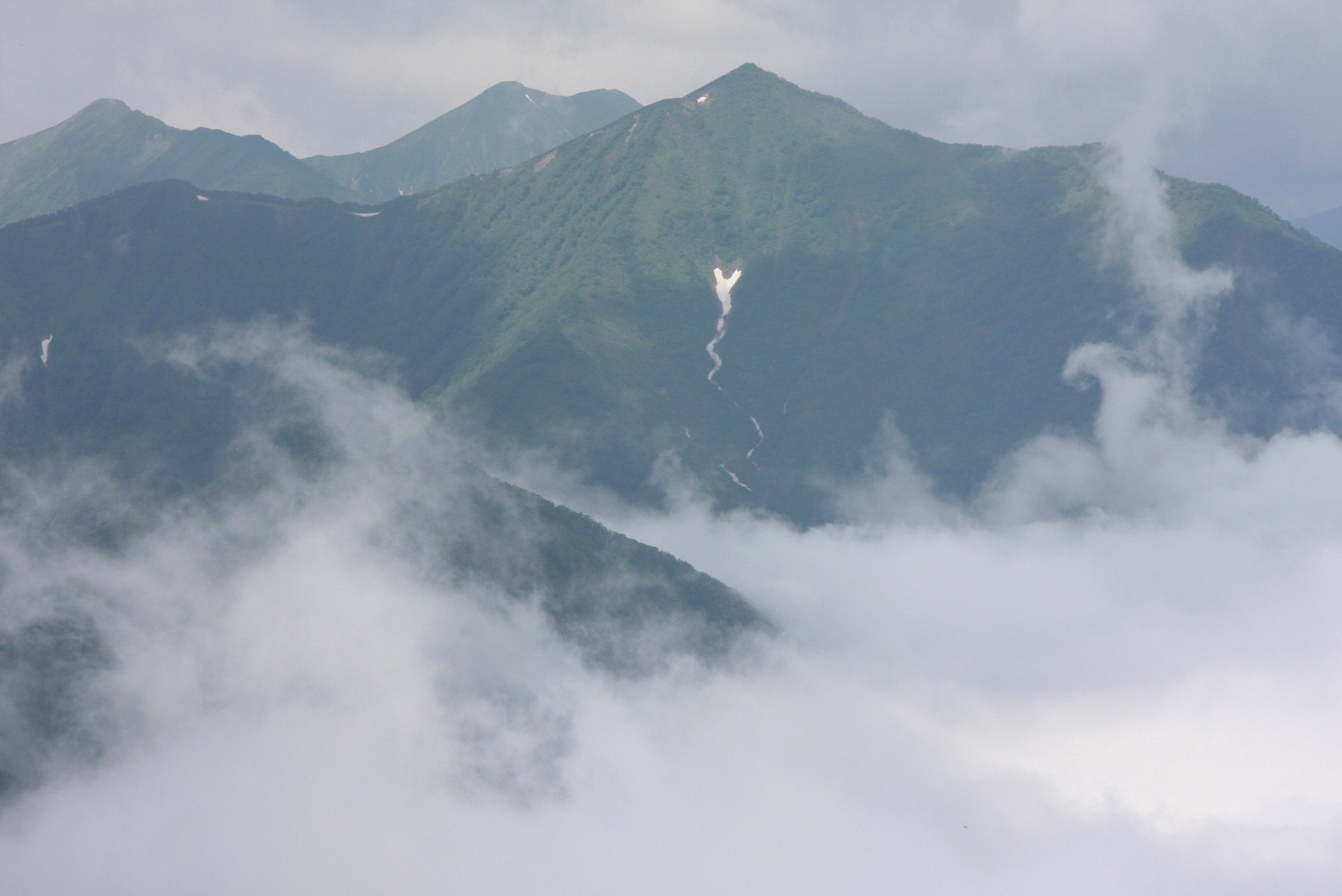
- A view from Mount Tokachiporoshiri

Highest point
- Elevation: 1,895.5 m (6,219 ft)
- Listing: List of mountains and hills of Japan by height
- Coordinates: 42°41′38″N 142°47′48″E

Geography
- Location: Hokkaidō, Japan
- Parent range: Hidaka Mountains
- Topo map(s): Geographical Survey Institute (国土地理院, Kokudochiriin) 25000:1 札内岳, 50000:1 札内岳

Geology
- Mountain type: Fold

Mount Satsunai (札内岳, Satsunai-dake) is located in the Hidaka Mountains, Hokkaidō, Japan.
