= Mount Tengu (Samani) =

- 天狗
- Mount Tengu in 1995.

Highest point
- Elevation: 666 m (2,185 ft)
- Listing: List of mountains and hills of Japan by height
- Coordinates: 42°5′23″N 143°7′34″E

Geography
- Location: Hokkaidō, Japan
- Parent range: Hidaka Mountains
- Topo map(s): Geographical Survey Institute (国土地理院, Kokudochiriin) 25000:1 袴腰山, 25000:1 アポイ岳, 50000:1 えりも

Geology
- Mountain type: Fold

Mount Tengu (天狗岳, Tengu-dake) is located in the Hidaka Mountains, Hokkaidō, Japan.
