= Mount Maru (Hiroo) =

Mountain

- 丸山

Highest point
- Elevation: 117.0 m (383.9 ft)
- Listing: List of mountains and hills of Japan by height
- Coordinates: 42°17′28″N 143°18′16″E

Naming
- English translation: round mountain
- Language of name: Japanese

Geography
- Location: Hokkaidō, Japan
- Parent range: Hidaka Mountains
- Topo map(s): Geographical Survey Institute (国土地理院, Kokudochiriin) 25000:1 広尾, 50000:1 広尾

Geology
- Mountain type: Fold

Mount Maru (丸山, Maru-yama) is located in the Hidaka Mountains, Hokkaidō, Japan. It is part of the Mount Maru Park (丸山公園, Maru-yama Kōen) in Hiroo, Hokkaido.
