= Mount Pirigai =

Mountain in Hokkaido, Japan

- ピリガイ山
- Location within Japan

Highest point
- Elevation: 1,166.9 m (3,828 ft)
- Prominence: 520 m (1,710 ft)
- Parent peak: Mount Nakano
- Listing: List of mountains and hills of Japan by height
- Coordinates: 42°26′9″N 142°47′45″E

Geography
- Location: Hokkaidō, Japan
- Parent range: Hidaka Mountains
- Topo map(s): Geospatial Information Authority (国土地理院, Kokudochiriin) 25000:1 ピリガイ山; 50000:1 浦河

Geology
- Mountain type: Fold

Mount Pirigai (ピリガイ山, Pirigai-yama) is located in the Hidaka Mountains, Hokkaidō, Japan.
