= Mount Sahoro =

Mountain in Hokkaido, Japan

- 佐幌岳
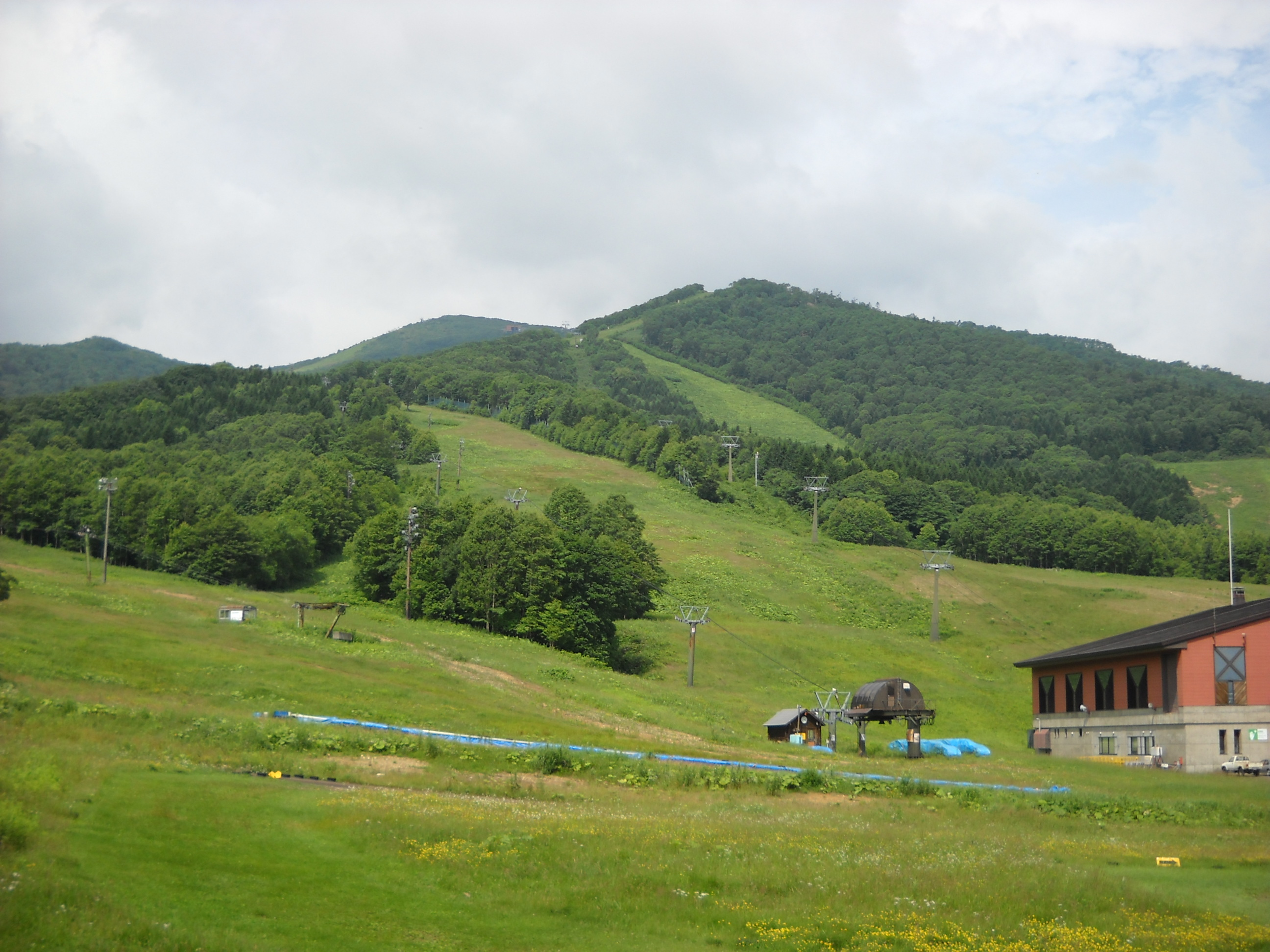

Highest point
- Elevation: 1,059.5 m (3,476 ft)
- Listing: List of mountains and hills of Japan by height
- Coordinates: 43.1733299°N 142.7810765°E

Geography
- Location: Hokkaido, Japan
- Parent range: Hidaka Mountains
- Topo map(s): Geographical Survey Institute (国土地理院, Kokudochiriin) 25000:1 佐幌岳

Geology
- Mountain type: Fold (geology)

Mount Sahoro (佐幌岳, Sahorodake) is located in the Hidaka Mountains, Hokkaido, Japan. It is the site of the Sahoro Ski Resort.

There are two routes up the mountain:

- Karikachi Pass route
- Sahoro Ski Resort route
