= Mount Daimaru =

- 大丸山

Highest point
- Elevation: 271 m (889 ft)
- Listing: List of mountains and hills of Japan by height
- Coordinates: 42°18′8″N 143°17′43″E

Naming
- English translation: big round mountain
- Language of name: Japanese

Geography
- Location: Hokkaidō, Japan
- Parent range: Hidaka Mountains
- Topo map(s): Geographical Survey Institute (国土地理院, Kokudochiriin) 25000:1 広尾, 50000:1 広尾

Geology
- Mountain type: Fold

Mount Daimaru (大丸山, Daimaru-yama) is a Japanese mountain which is located in the Hidaka Mountains, Hokkaidō, Japan. It is part of the Mount Daimaru Forest Park (大丸山森林公園, Daimaru-yama Shinrin Kōen) in Hiroo, Hokkaido.
