= Mount Rakko =

Mountain in the country of Japan

- 楽古岳
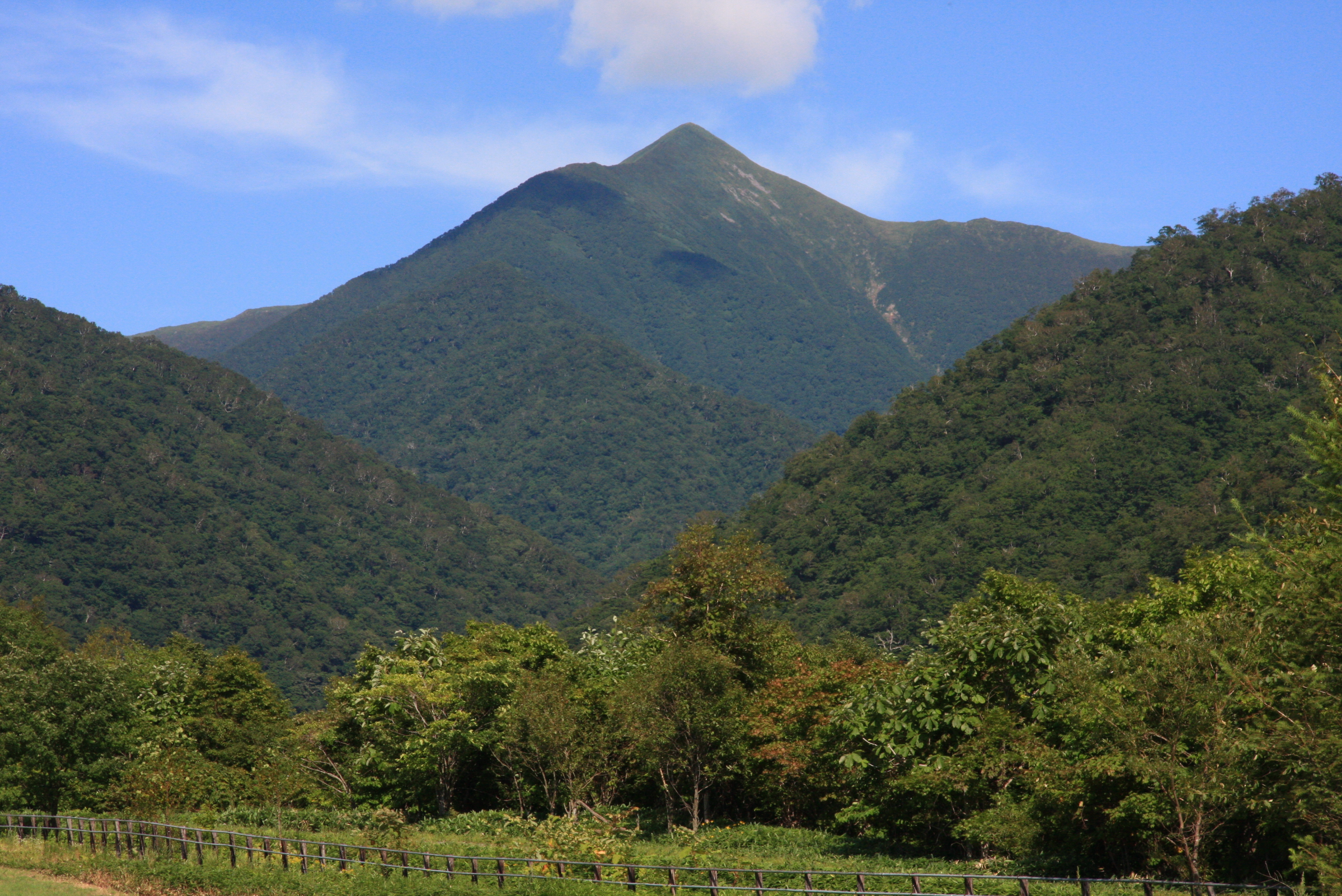
- A view from Menasyunbetsu River

Highest point
- Elevation: 1,471.5 m (4,828 ft)
- Listing: List of mountains and hills of Japan by height
- Coordinates: 42°16′21″N 143°06′40″E

Geography
- Location: Hokkaidō, Japan
- Parent range: Hidaka Mountains
- Topo map(s): Geographical Survey Institute (国土地理院, Kokudochiriin) 25000:1 楽古岳, 50000:1 楽古岳

Geology
- Mountain type: Fold

Mount Rakko (楽古岳, Rakko-dake) is located in the Hidaka Mountains, Hokkaidō, Japan.
