= Mount Hakamagoshi (Samani) =

Mountain

- 袴腰山

Highest point
- Elevation: 872.3 m (2,862 ft)
- Listing: List of mountains and hills of Japan by height
- Coordinates: 42°5′41″N 143°9′21″E

Geography
- Location: Hokkaidō, Japan
- Parent range: Hidaka Mountains
- Topo map(s): Geographical Survey Institute (国土地理院, Kokudochiriin) 25000:1 袴腰山, 50000:1 えりも

Geology
- Mountain type: Fold

Mount Hakamagoshi (袴腰山, Hakamagoshi-yama) is located in the Hidaka Mountains, Hokkaidō, Japan.
