= Mount Chiroro =

- チロロ岳
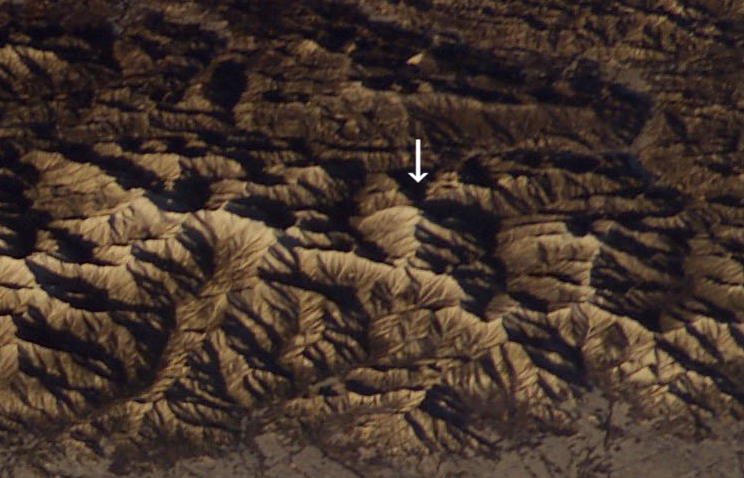
- Mount Chiroro from a satellite photo taken by NASA

Highest point
- Elevation: 1,879.9 m (6,168 ft)
- Listing: List of mountains and hills of Japan by height
- Coordinates: 42°49′32″N 142°40′31″E

Geography
- Location: Hokkaido, Japan
- Parent range: Hidaka Mountains
- Topo map(s): Geographical Survey Institute (国土地理院, Kokudochiriin) 50000:1 幌尻岳, 25000:1 ピパイロ岳

Geology
- Mountain type: Fold

Mount Chiroro (チロロ岳, Chiroro-dake) is located in the Hidaka Mountains, Hokkaido, Japan. Mount Chiroro's western summit (チロロ西峰, Chiroro-nishi-hō) has a height of 1,848 metres (6,063 ft).
