= Mount Petegari =

Mountain in Hokkaido, Japan

- ペテガリ岳
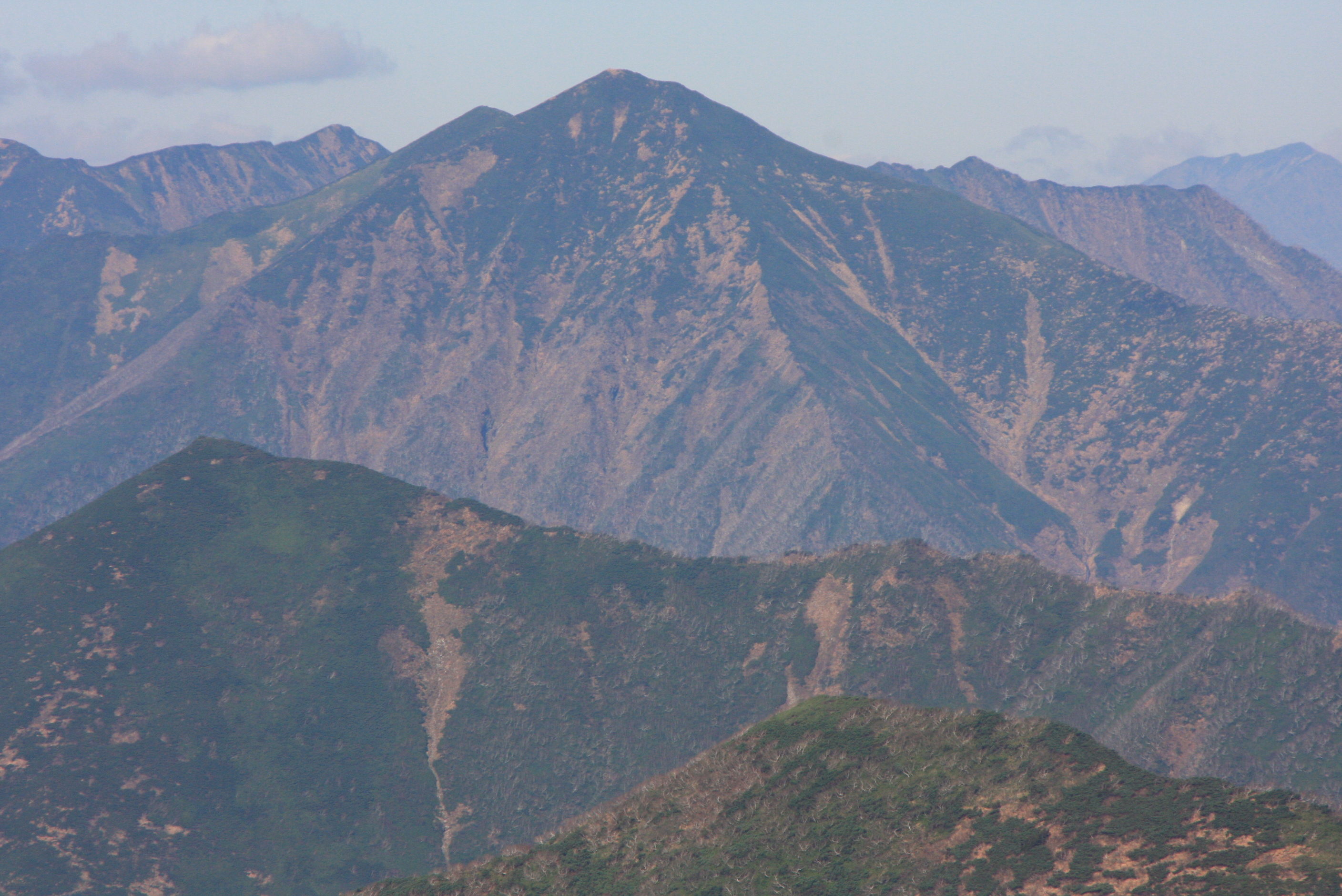
- A view from Mount Kamui

Highest point
- Elevation: 1,736.2 m (5,696 ft)
- Listing: List of mountains and hills of Japan by height
- Coordinates: 42°29′58″N 142°52′16″E

Geography
- Location: Hokkaidō, Japan
- Parent range: Hidaka Mountains
- Topo map(s): Geographical Survey Institute (国土地理院, Kokudochiriin) 25000:1 ビリガイ山, 25000:1 ヤオロマップ岳, 50000:1 神威岳

Geology
- Mountain type: Fold

Mount Petegari (ペテガリ岳, Petegari-dake) is located in the Hidaka Mountains, Hokkaidō, Japan.
