= Mount Okishimappu =

Mountain

- オキシマップ山

Highest point
- Elevation: 895 m (2,936 ft)
- Listing: List of mountains and hills of Japan by height
- Coordinates: 42°3′29″N 143°13′12″E

Geography
- Location: Hokkaidō, Japan
- Parent range: Hidaka Mountains
- Topo map(s): Geographical Survey Institute (国土地理院, Kokudochiriin) 25000:1 えりも, 50000:1 えりも

Geology
- Mountain type: Fold

Mount Okishimappu (オキシマップ山, Okishimappu-yama) is located in the Hidaka Mountains, Hokkaidō, Japan.
