= Karikachi Pass =

Mountain pass in the Hidaka Mountains, Hokkaidō, Japan

- 狩勝峠
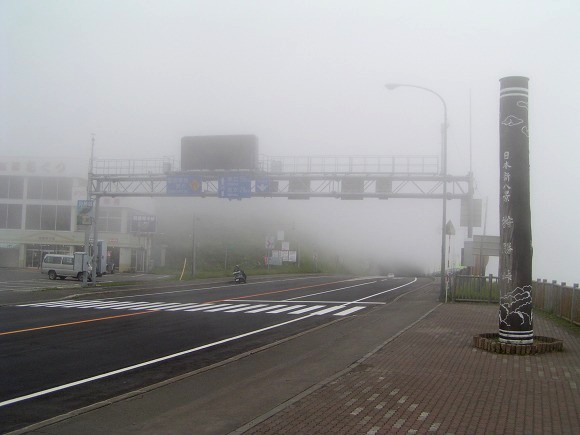

- Location within Japan
- Elevation: 644 metres (2,113 ft)
- Traversed by: Japan National Route 38

Third Approach
- Location: Japan
- Range: Hidaka Mountains
- Coordinates: 43°8′9.6″N 142°45′53.9″E
- Topo map: Geographical Survey Institute; 25000:1 狩勝峠; 25000:1 落合; 50000:1 夕張岳

Karikachi Pass (狩勝峠, Karikachi-tōge) is a mountain pass at the north end of the Hidaka Mountains of Hokkaidō, Japan. The pass traverses the mountains at 644 metres (2,113 ft) and is 21 kilometres (13.0 mi) long. The road is 5.5 metres (18.0 ft) wide with a maximum grade of 5.3%. The minimum curve radius is 90 metres (295 ft). Snow is possible on the pass from October to May. Japan National Route 38 crosses the pass between Minamifurano and Shintoku.

The name of the pass was derived from taking elements from both Ishikari Province as well as Tokachi Province. Its history can be traced back to the Edo period, when it was the first road to pass through the Hidaka Mountains.

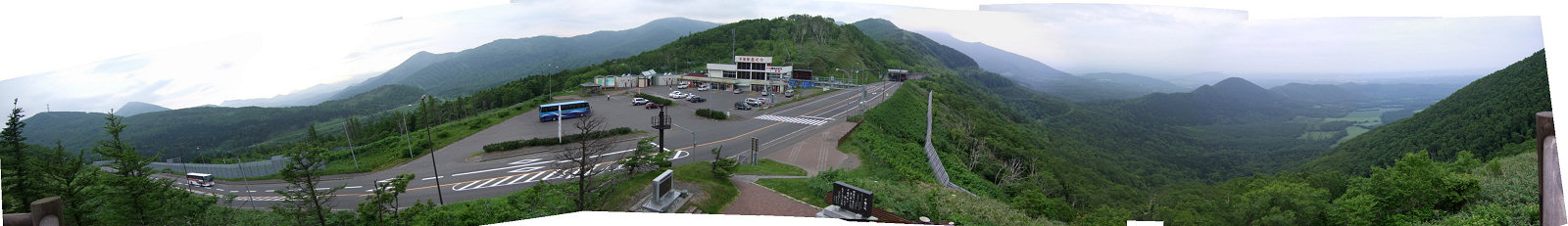
Left is Ishikari and right is Tokachi (July 2007)
