= Mount Iwanai =

Mountain in Hokkaidō, Japan

- 岩内岳
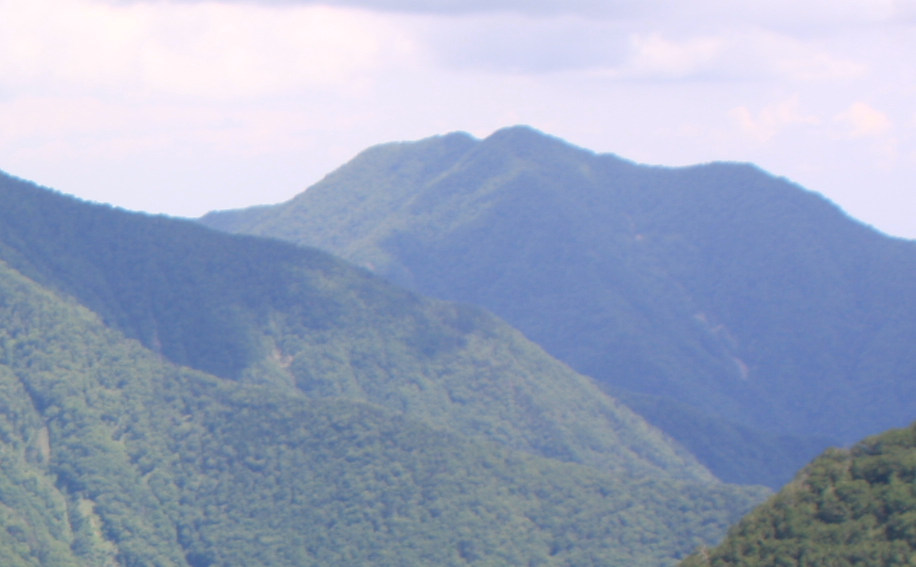
- Seen from Hachinosawa.

Highest point
- Elevation: 1,497.7 m (4,914 ft)
- Listing: List of mountains and hills of Japan by height
- Coordinates: 42°39′29″N 142°51′45″E

Geography
- Location: Hokkaidō, Japan
- Parent range: Hidaka Mountains
- Topo map(s): Geographical Survey Institute (国土地理院, Kokudochiriin) 25000:1 岩内川上流, 25000:1 札内川上流, 50000:1 札内川上流

Geology
- Mountain type: Fold

Mount Iwanai (岩内岳, Iwanai-dake) is located in the Hidaka Mountains, Hokkaidō, Japan.
