= Mount Ponyaoromappu =

Mountain in the country of Japan

- ポンヤオロマップ岳

Highest point
- Elevation: 1,405.6 m (4,612 ft)
- Listing: List of mountains and hills of Japan by height
- Coordinates: 42°30′49″N 142°56′16″E

Geography
- Location: Hokkaidō, Japan
- Parent range: Hidaka Mountains
- Topo map(s): Geographical Survey Institute (国土地理院, Kokudochiriin) 25000:1 歴舟川上流, 50000:1 札内川上流

Geology
- Mountain type: Fold

Mount Ponyaoromappu (ポンヤオロマップ岳, Ponyaoromappu-dake) is located in the Hidaka Mountains, Hokkaidō, Japan.
