= Mount Shikashinai =

Mountain in the Hidaka Mountains, Hokkaidō, Japan

- シカシナイ山

Highest point
- Elevation: 1,627.9 m (5,341 ft)
- Listing: List of mountains and hills of Japan by height
- Coordinates: 42°35′42″N 142°44′3″E

Geography
- Location: Hokkaidō, Japan
- Parent range: Hidaka Mountains
- Topo map(s): Geographical Survey Institute (国土地理院, Kokudochiriin) 25000:1 イドンナップ, 50000:1 イドンナップ

Geology
- Mountain type: Fold

Mount Shikashinai (シカシナイ山, Shikashinai-yama) is located in the Hidaka Mountains, Hokkaidō, Japan.
