= Mount Beppirigai =

Mountain in Japan

- ベッピリガイ山

Highest point
- Elevation: 1,307.7 m (4,290 ft)
- Listing: List of mountains and hills of Japan by height
- Coordinates: 42°28′14″N 142°51′6″E

Naming
- Language of name: Ainu

Geography
- Location: Hokkaidō, Japan
- Parent range: Hidaka Mountains
- Topo map(s): Geographical Survey Institute (国土地理院, Kokudochiriin) 25000:1 ビリガイ山, 50000:1 神威岳

Geology
- Mountain type: Fold

Mount Beppirigai (ベッピリガイ山, Beppirigai-san) is located in the Hidaka Mountains, Hokkaidō, Japan.
