= Mount Pipairo =

Mountain in Hokkaido, Japan

- ピパイロ岳

Highest point
- Elevation: 1,916.5 m (6,288 ft)
- Listing: List of mountains and hills of Japan by height
- Coordinates: 42°46′23″N 142°43′39″E

Geography
- Location: Hokkaidō, Japan
- Parent range: Hidaka Mountains
- Topo map(s): Geographical Survey Institute (国土地理院, Kokudochiriin) 50000:1 幌尻岳, 25000:1 ピパイロ岳

Geology
- Mountain type: Fold

Mount Pipairo (ピパイロ岳, Pipairo-dake) is located in the Hidaka Mountains, Hokkaidō, Japan.
