= Mount Rubeshibe =

Japanese mount

- ルベシベ山

Highest point
- Elevation: 1,740.0 m (5,708.7 ft)
- Listing: List of mountains and hills of Japan by height
- Coordinates: 42°49′41″N 142°43′14″E

Geography
- Location: Hokkaidō, Japan
- Parent range: Hidaka Mountains
- Topo map(s): Geographical Survey Institute (国土地理院, Kokudochiriin) 25000:1 ヤオロマップ岳, 50000:1 神威岳

Geology
- Mountain type: Fold

Mount Rubeshibe (ルベシベ山, Rubeshibe-yama) is located in the Hidaka Mountains, Hokkaidō, Japan.
