= Mount Yaoromappu =

Mountain in Hokkaido, Japan

- ヤオロマップ岳

Highest point
- Elevation: 1,794.3 m (5,887 ft)
- Listing: List of mountains and hills of Japan by height
- Coordinates: 42°32′56″N 142°49′41″E

Geography
- Location: Hokkaidō, Japan
- Parent range: Hidaka Mountains
- Topo map(s): Geographical Survey Institute (国土地理院, Kokudochiriin) 25000:1 ヤオロマップ岳, 50000:1 札内川上流

Geology
- Mountain type: Fold

Mount Yaoromappu (ヤオロマップ岳, Yaoromappu-dake) is located in the Hidaka Mountains, Hokkaidō, Japan.
