= Mount Odasshu =

Mountain in Hokkaido, Japan

- オダッシュ山

Highest point
- Elevation: 1,097.7 m (3,601 ft)
- Listing: List of mountains and hills of Japan by height
- Coordinates: 43°3′6″N 142°44′56″E

Geography
- Location: Hokkaido, Japan
- Parent range: Hidaka Mountains
- Topo map(s): Geographical Survey Institute (国土地理院, Kokudochiriin) 25000:1 新得

Geology
- Mountain type: Fold (geology)

Mount Odasshu (オダッシュ山, Odasshu-yama) is located in the Hidaka Mountains of Hokkaido, Japan. The Yasuda River route leads to the peak.
