= Hidaka Pass =

- 日高峠
- Interactive map of Hidaka Pass
- Elevation: 495 metres (1,624 ft)
- Traversed by: Japan National Route 237

Third Approach
- Location: Japan
- Range: Hidaka Mountains
- Coordinates: 42°54′44″N 142°26′49″E
- Topo map: Geographical Survey Institute; 25000:1 占冠中央; 25000:1 日高; 50000:1 日高

Hidaka Pass (日高峠, Hidaka-tōge) is a mountain pass in the north-end of the Hidaka Mountains of Hokkaidō, Japan. The pass traverses the mountains at 495 metres (1,624 ft) and is 6.9 kilometres (4.3 mi) long. The road is 6 metres (20 ft) wide with a maximum grade of 6%. The minimum curve radius is 160 metres (520 ft). Snow is possible on the pass from October to April. Japan National Route 237 crosses the pass between Hidaka and Shimukappu.
