= Mount Futamata =

Mountain in Japan

- 二股山

Highest point
- Elevation: 1,437.9 m (4,718 ft)
- Listing: List of mountains and hills of Japan by height
- Coordinates: 42°41′16″N 142°43′4″E

Geography
- Location: Hokkaidō, Japan
- Parent range: Hidaka Mountains
- Topo map(s): Geographical Survey Institute (国土地理院, Kokudochiriin) 25000:1 幌尻岳

Geology
- Mountain type: Fold

Mount Futamata (二股山, Futamata-yama) is located in the Hidaka Mountains, Hokkaidō, Japan.
