= Mount Nishikawa =

Mountain in Hokkaido, Japan

- 西川岳

Highest point
- Elevation: 1,362.0 m (4,468.5 ft)
- Listing: List of mountains and hills of Japan by height
- Coordinates: 42°33′55″N 142°46′1″E

Geography
- Location: Hokkaidō, Japan
- Parent range: Hidaka Mountains
- Topo map(s): Geographical Survey Institute (国土地理院, Kokudochiriin) 25000:1 ヤオロマップ岳

Geology
- Mountain type: Fold

Mount Nishikawa (西川岳, Nishikawa-dake)

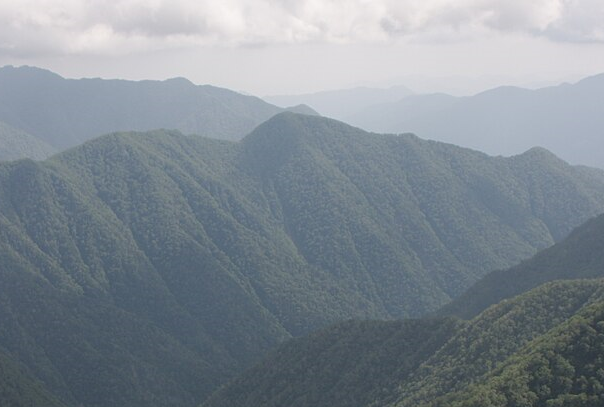
Mountain view

is located in the Hidaka Mountains, Hokkaidō, Japan.
