= Mount Tsurugi (Hokkaido) =

Mountain in Hokkaidō, Japan

- 剣山

Highest point
- Elevation: 1,205.1 m (3,954 ft)
- Listing: List of mountains and hills of Japan by height
- Coordinates: 42°50′55″N 142°53′6″E

Geography
- Location: Hokkaido, Japan
- Parent range: Hidaka Mountains
- Topo map(s): Geographical Survey Institute (国土地理院, Kokudochiriin) 25000:1 渋山

Geology
- Mountain type: Fold (geology)

Mount Tsurugi (剣山, Tsurugi-san) is located in the Hidaka Mountains, Hokkaido, Japan. The Mount Tsurugi Shrine route leads up to the peak.

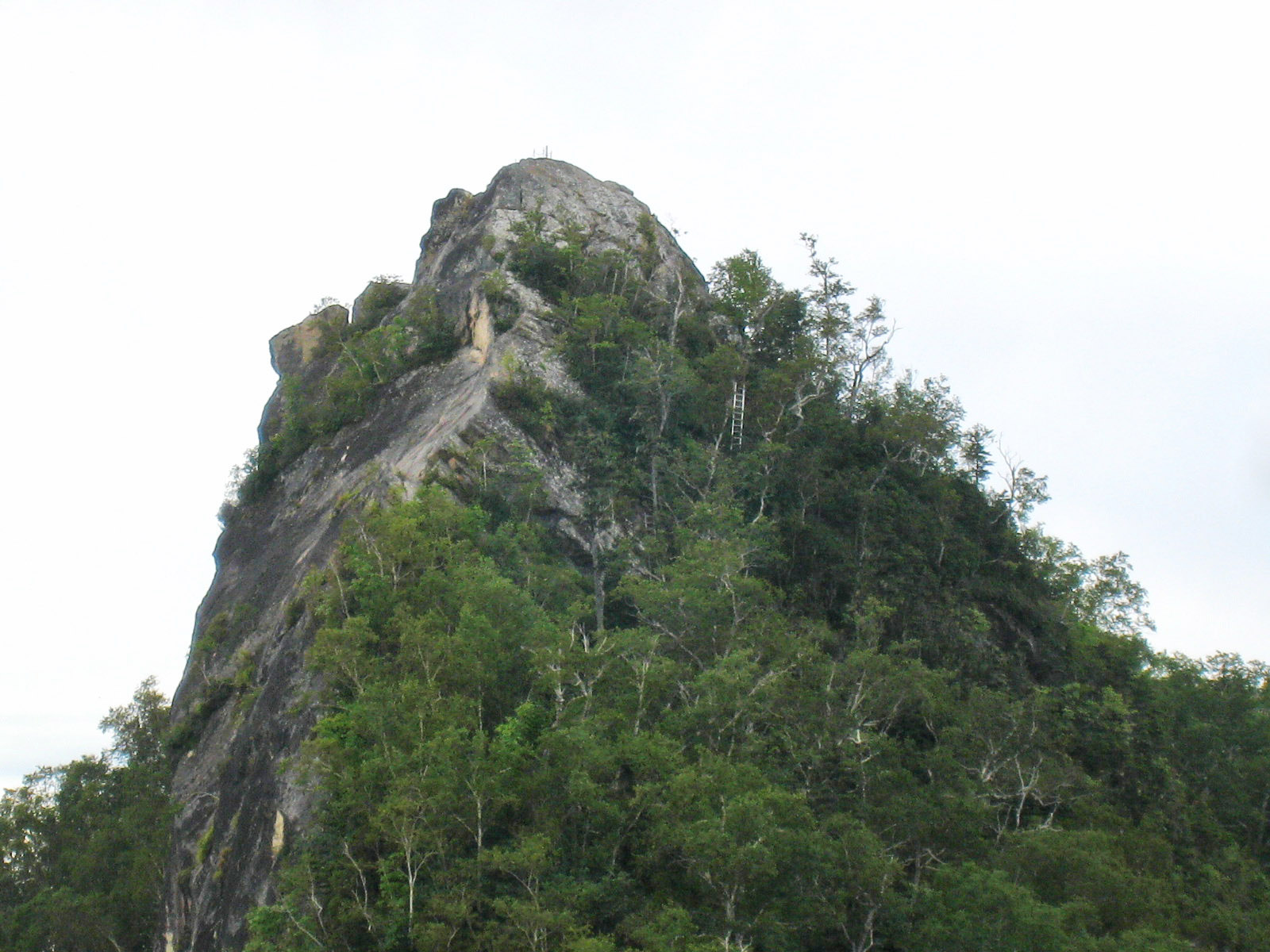
The top of Mount Tsurugi
