= Mount Piratokomi =

Mountain in Hokkaido, Japan

- ピラトコミ山

Highest point
- Elevation: 1,587.7 m (5,209 ft)
- Listing: List of mountains and hills of Japan by height
- Coordinates: 42°36′23″N 142°50′21″E

Geography
- Location: Hokkaidō, Japan
- Parent range: Hidaka Mountains
- Topo map(s): Geographical Survey Institute (国土地理院, Kokudochiriin) 25000:1 札内川上流, 50000:1 札内川上流

Geology
- Mountain type: Fold

Mount Piratokomi (ピラトコミ山, piratokomi-san) is a mountain located in the Hidaka Mountains, Hokkaidō, Japan. On the Geographical Survey Institute map, the mountain is mislabeled Mount Piratomi (ピラトミ山, piratomi-san).
