= Mount Rubetsune =

Mountain in the country of Japan

- ルベツネ山

Highest point
- Elevation: 1,727.3 m (5,667 ft)
- Listing: List of mountains and hills of Japan by height
- Coordinates: 42°31′12″N 142°51′24″E

Geography
- Location: Hokkaidō, Japan
- Parent range: Hidaka Mountains
- Topo map(s): Geographical Survey Institute (国土地理院, Kokudochiriin) 25000:1 ヤオロマップ岳, 50000:1 札内川上流

Geology
- Mountain type: Fold

Mount Rubetsune (ルベツネ山, Rubetsune-san) is located in the Hidaka Mountains, Hokkaidō, Japan.

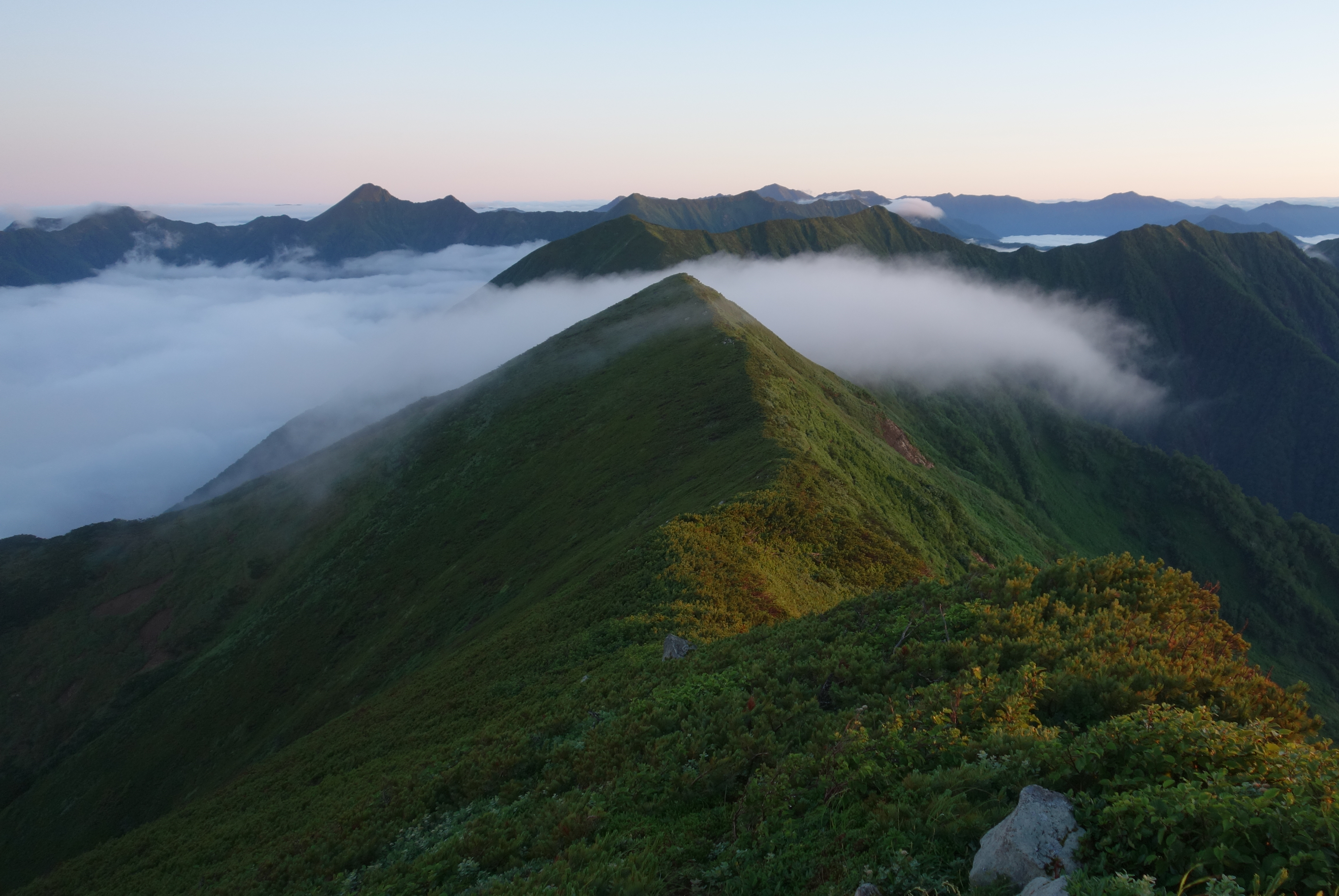
View of Mount Rubetsune from the nearby beach peak of Mt. Petegari.
