= Mount Omusha =

Mountain in Hokkaido, Japan

- Omusha-nupuri (Futago-yama) viewed from Mt. Rakkodake.

Highest point
- Elevation: 1,379 m (4,524 ft)
- Listing: List of mountains and hills of Japan by height
- Coordinates: 42°18′33″N 143°3′17″E

Naming
- Native name: 双子山 (オムシャヌプリ) (Japanese)
- English translation: twin children mountain
- Pronunciation: Japanese: [omɯɕanɯpɯɾi]

Geography
- Location: Hokkaidō, Japan
- Parent range: Hidaka Mountains
- Topo map(s): Geographical Survey Institute (国土地理院, Kokudochiriin) 25000:1 楽古岳

Geology
- Mountain type: Fold

Mount Omusha (双子山, Omusha-nupuri) is located in the Hidaka Mountains, Hokkaidō, Japan. The mountain has two peaks, the higher being 1,379 metres (4,524 ft) and the lower being 1,363 metres (4,472 ft).
