= Mount Kumami =

Mountain in Hokkaido, Japan

- 熊見山

Highest point
- Elevation: 1,175 m (3,855 ft)
- Listing: List of mountains and hills of Japan by height
- Coordinates: 42°59′18″N 142°45′49″E

Geography
- Location: Hokkaidō, Japan
- Parent range: Hidaka Mountains
- Topo map(s): Geographical Survey Institute (国土地理院, Kokudochiriin) 25000:1 十勝石山

Geology
- Mountain type: Fold

Mount Kumami (熊見山, Kumami-yama) is located in the Hidaka Mountains, Hokkaidō, Japan.
