= Mount Namewakka =

Mountain in Hokkaido, Japan

- ナメワッカ岳

Highest point
- Elevation: 1,799.1 m (5,903 ft)
- Listing: List of mountains and hills of Japan by height
- Coordinates: 42°39′52″N 142°43′19″E

Geography
- Location: Hokkaidō, Japan
- Parent range: Hidaka Mountains
- Topo map(s): Geographical Survey Institute (国土地理院, Kokudochiriin) 25000:1 イドンナップ岳

Geology
- Mountain type: Fold

Mount Namewakka (ナメワッカ岳, Namewakka-dake) is located in the Hidaka Mountains, Hokkaidō, Japan.

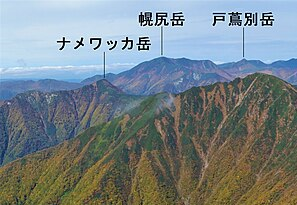
Mt. Namewakka
