= Mount Esaoman-Tottabetsu =

Mountain in the Hidaka Mountains, Hokkaidō, Japan

- エサオマントッタベツ岳
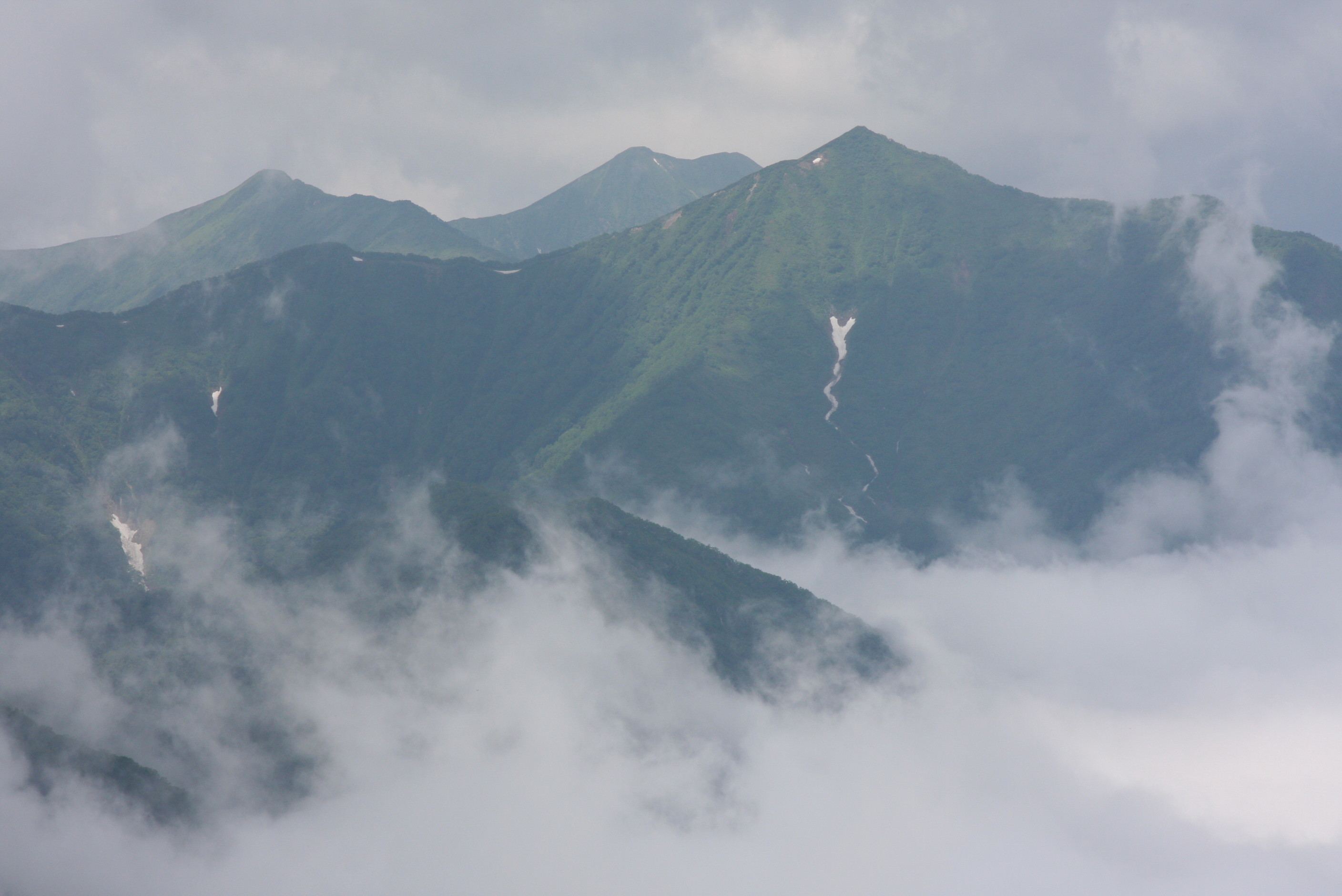
- Mount Esaoman-Tottabetsu, in the center

Highest point
- Elevation: 1,902 m (6,240 ft)
- Listing: List of mountains and hills of Japan by height
- Coordinates: 42°41′21″N 142°45′28″E

Geography
- Location: Hokkaidō, Japan
- Parent range: Hidaka Mountains
- Topo map(s): Geographical Survey Institute (国土地理院, Kokudochiriin) 25000:1 札内岳

Geology
- Mountain type: Fold

Mount Esaoman-Tottabetsu (エサオマントッタベツ岳, Esaoman Tottabetsu-dake) is located in the Hidaka Mountains, Hokkaidō, Japan.
