= Mount Kannon =

- 観音岳

Highest point
- Elevation: 932 m (3,058 ft)
- Listing: List of mountains and hills of Japan by height
- Coordinates: 42°4′49″N 143°15′33″E

Naming
- English translation: named after Kannon
- Language of name: Japanese

Geography
- Location: Hokkaidō, Japan
- Parent range: Hidaka Mountains
- Topo map(s): Geographical Survey Institute (国土地理院, Kokudochiriin) 25000:1 日高目黒, 25000:1 庶野, 25000:1 えりも, 50000:1 庶野

Geology
- Mountain type: Fold

Mount Kannon (観音岳, Kannon-dake) is located in the Hidaka Mountains, Hokkaidō, Japan. It is named after Kannon, the bodhisattva of compassion.
