= Mount Kamitaki =

Mountain in Japan

- 上滝山

Highest point
- Elevation: 1,331 m (4,367 ft)
- Listing: List of mountains and hills of Japan by height
- Coordinates: 42°56′42″N 142°41′2″E

Geography
- Location: Hokkaidō, Japan
- Parent range: Hidaka Mountains
- Topo map(s): Geographical Survey Institute (国土地理院, Kokudochiriin) 25000:1 沙流岳

Geology
- Mountain type: Fold

Mount Kamitaki (上滝山, Kamitaki-yama) is located in the Hidaka Mountains, Hokkaidō, Japan.
