= Mount Idonmappu =

Mountain in Hokkaidō, Japan

- イドンナップ岳

Highest point
- Elevation: 1,752 m (5,748 ft)
- Listing: List of mountains and hills of Japan by height
- Coordinates: 42°37′49″N 142°38′56″E

Geography
- Location: Hokkaidō, Japan
- Parent range: Hidaka Mountains
- Topo map(s): Geographical Survey Institute (国土地理院, Kokudochiriin) 25000:1 イドンナップ岳, 50000:1 イドンナップ岳

Geology
- Mountain type: Fold

Mount Idonmappu (イドンナップ岳, Idonmappu-dake) is located in the Hidaka Mountains, Hokkaidō, Japan.
