= Mount Toyoni (Erimo) =

Mountain in Erimo, Hokkaido, Japan

- 豊似岳
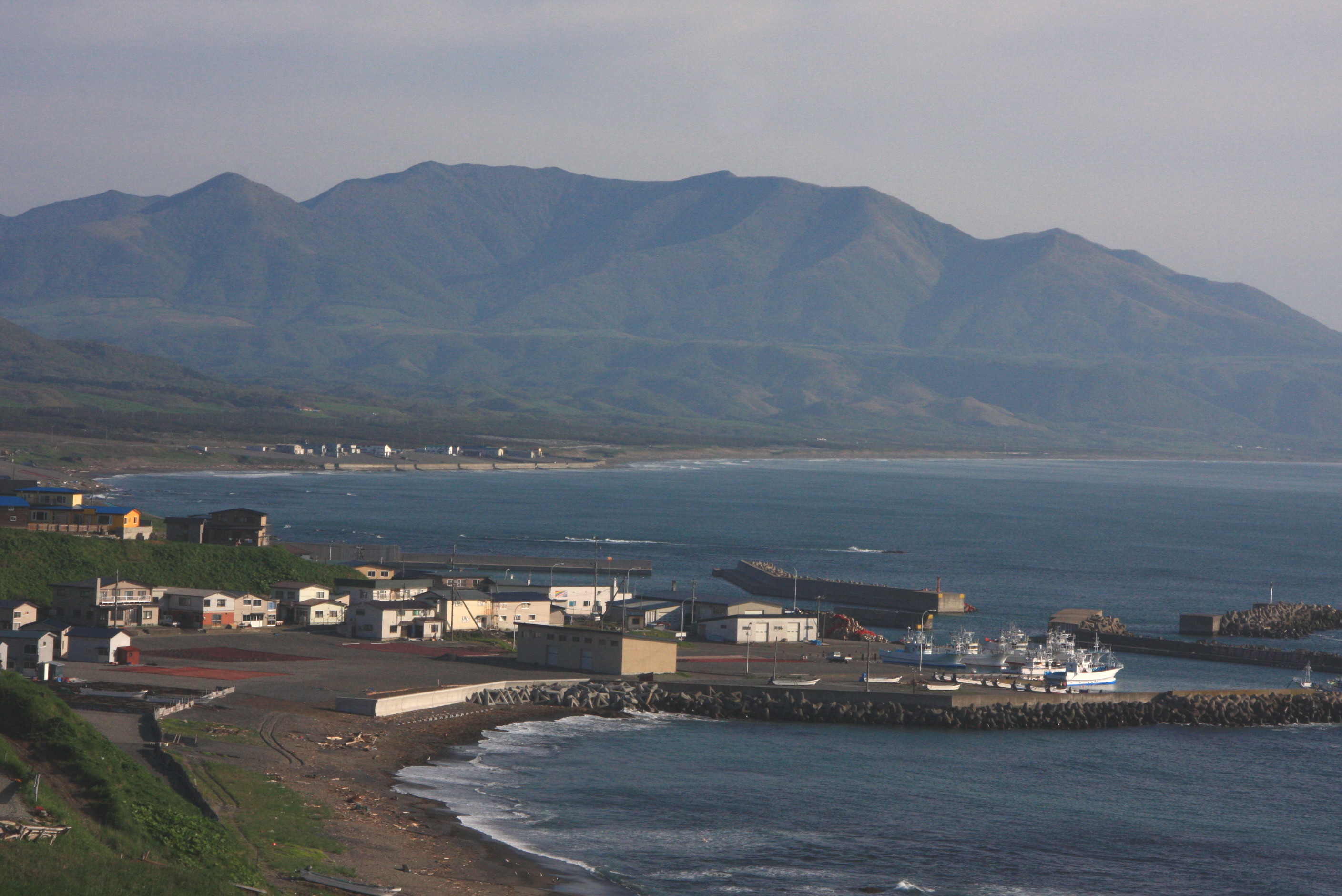
- A view from Cape Erimo

Highest point
- Elevation: 1,105.0 m (3,625.3 ft)
- Listing: List of mountains and hills of Japan by height
- Coordinates: 42°4′37″N 143°13′59″E

Geography
- Location: Hokkaidō, Japan
- Parent range: Hidaka Mountains
- Topo map(s): Geographical Survey Institute (国土地理院, Kokudochiriin); 25000:1 えりも; 50000:1 えりも

Geology
- Mountain type: Fold

Mount Toyoni (豊似岳, Toyoni-dake) is located in the Hidaka Mountains, Hokkaidō, Japan.
