= Mount Yoko (Hidaka) =

Mountain in Hokkaidō, Japan

- 横山

Highest point
- Elevation: 725.3 m (2,380 ft)
- Listing: List of mountains and hills of Japan by height
- Coordinates: 42°20′37″N 142°34′51″E

Geography
- Location: Hokkaidō, Japan
- Parent range: Hidaka Mountains
- Topo map(s): Geographical Survey Institute (国土地理院, Kokudochiriin) 25000:1 ペラリ山, 50000:1 農屋

Geology
- Mountain type: Fold

Mount Yoko (横山, Yoko-yama) is located in the Hidaka Mountains, Hokkaidō, Japan. The mountain has three peaks:

- North Mount Yoko (北横山, Kita-yoko-yama) — 725.3 metres (2,379.6 ft)
- Mount Yoko Middle Peak (横山中岳, Yoko-yama-naka-dake) — 724 metres (2,375 ft)
- South Mount Yoko (南横山, Minami-yoko-yama) — 655.5 metres (2,150.6 ft)
