= Mount Fushimi =

Mountain in Hokkaido, Japan

- 伏美岳
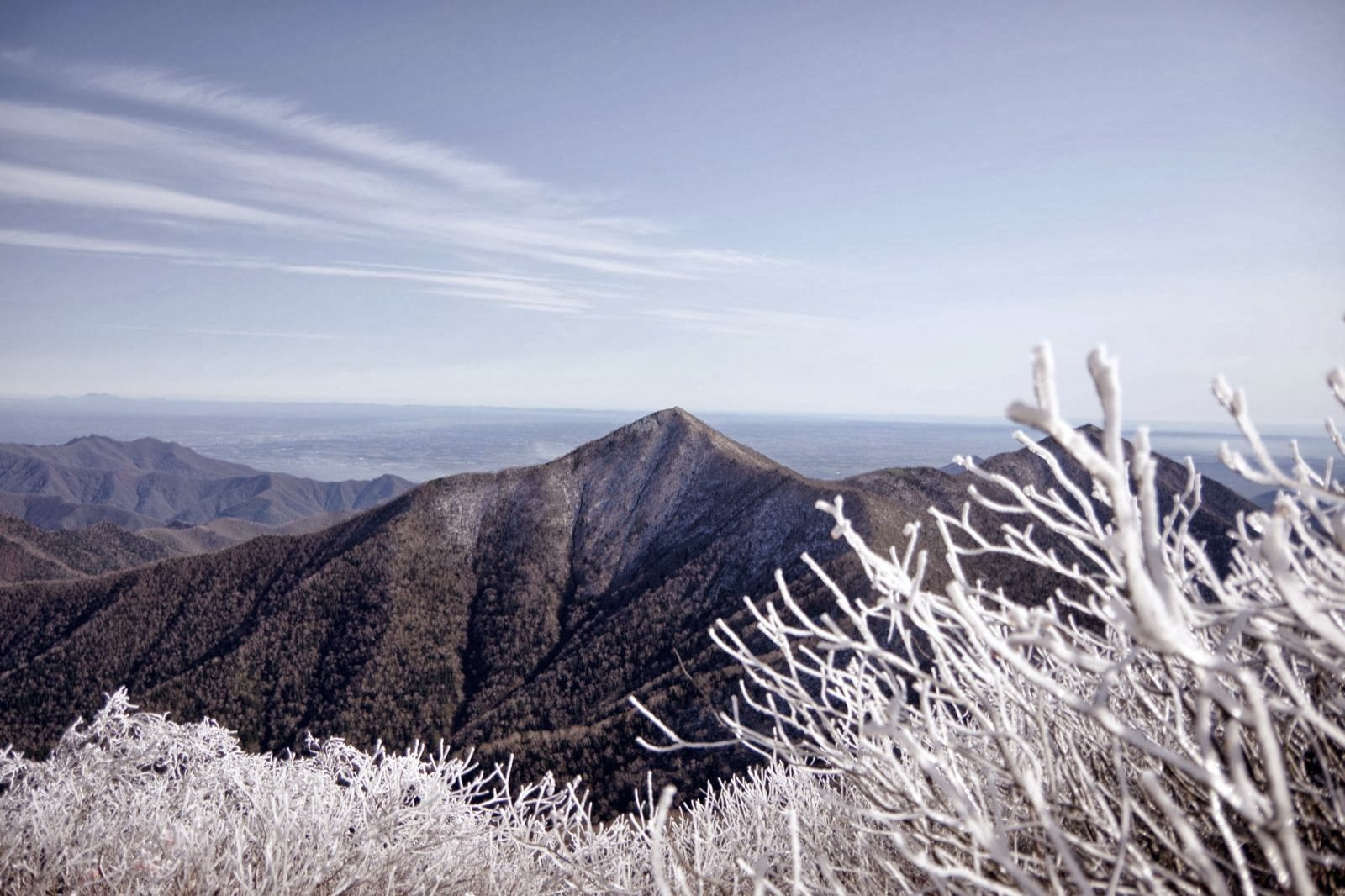

Highest point
- Elevation: 1,792 m (5,879 ft)
- Listing: List of mountains and hills of Japan by height
- Coordinates: 42°46′32″N 142°45′55″E

Geography
- Location: Hokkaidō, Japan
- Parent range: Hidaka Mountains
- Topo map(s): Geographical Survey Institute (国土地理院, Kokudochiriin) 50000:1 札内岳, 25000:1 妙敷山

Geology
- Mountain type: Fold

Mount Fushimi (伏美岳, Fushimi-dake) is located in the Hidaka Mountains, Hokkaidō, Japan.
