= Mount Toyoni (Urakawa-Hiroo) =

- トヨニ岳
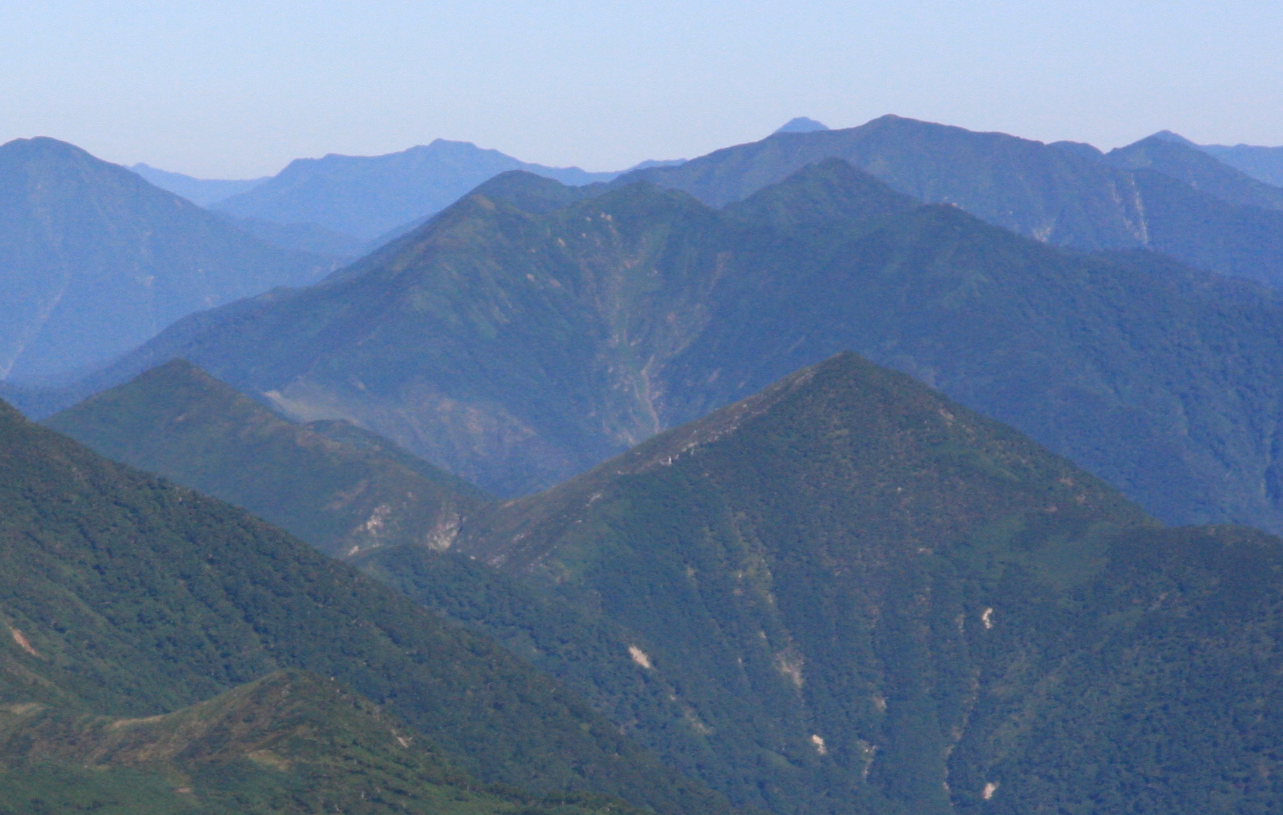
- Mt. Toyoni seen from Mt. Rakuko

Highest point
- Elevation: 1,493 m (4,898 ft)
- Listing: List of mountains and hills of Japan by height
- Coordinates: 42°21′46″N 143°0′22″E

Geography
- Location: Hokkaidō, Japan
- Parent range: Hidaka Mountains
- Topo map(s): Geographical Survey Institute (国土地理院, Kokudochiriin) 25000:1 トヨニ岳, 50000:1 上豊似

Geology
- Mountain type: Fold

Mount Toyoni (トヨニ岳, Toyoni-dake) is located in the Hidaka Mountains, Hokkaidō, Japan.
