= Mount Tokachi (Hidaka) =

- 十勝岳
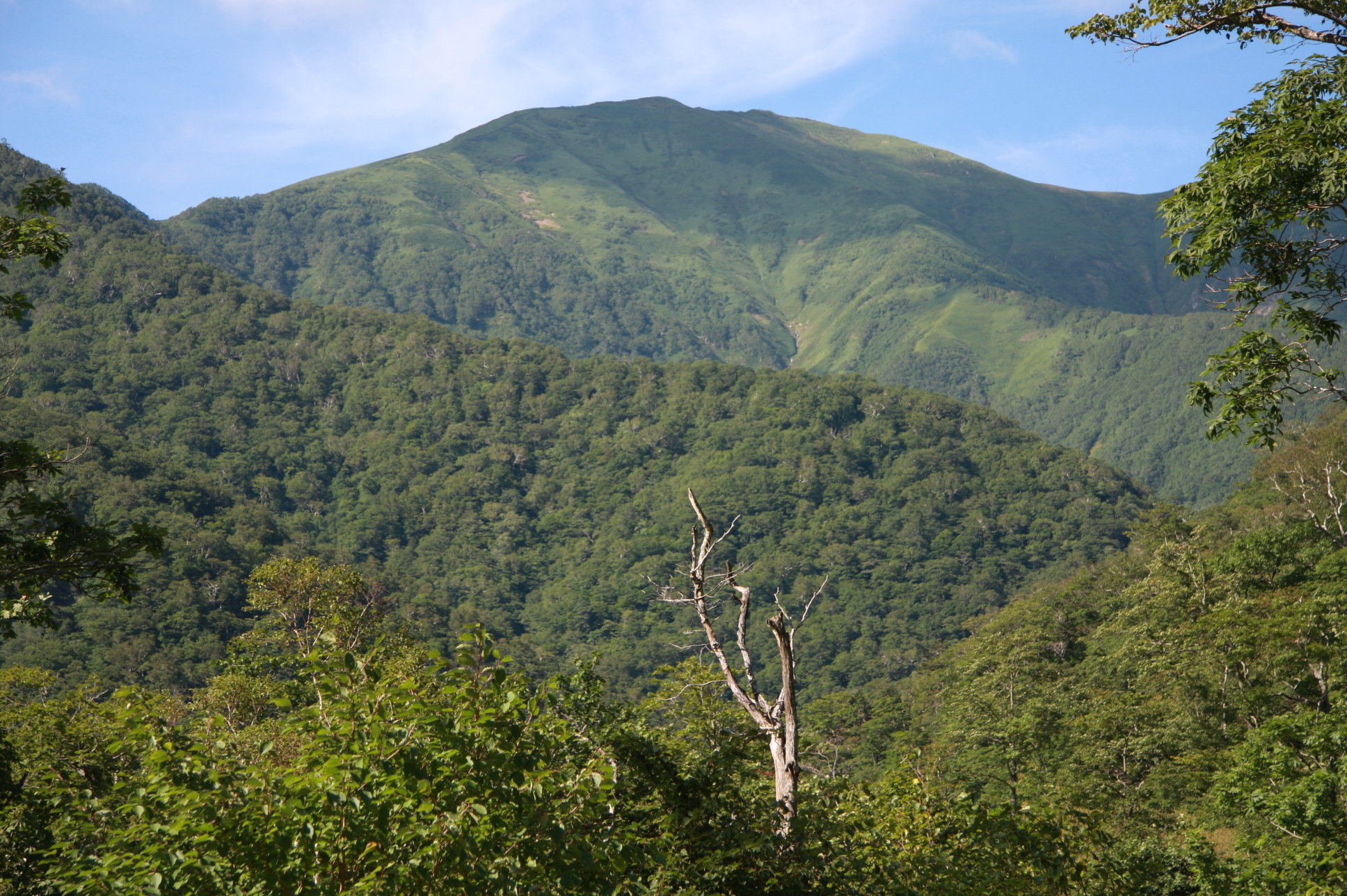

Highest point
- Elevation: 1,457.2 m (4,781 ft)
- Listing: List of mountains and hills of Japan by height
- Coordinates: 42°17′27″N 143°4′34″E

Geography
- Location: Hokkaido, Japan
- Parent range: Hidaka Mountains
- Topo map(s): Geographical Survey Institute (国土地理院, Kokudochiriin) 25000:1 楽古岳, 50000:1 楽古岳

Geology
- Mountain type: Fold

Mount Tokachi (十勝岳, Tokachi-dake) is located in the Hidaka Mountains, Hokkaido, Japan.
