= Pinneshiri (Hidaka) =

Mountain in the country of Japan

- ピンネシリ
- Location within Japan

Highest point
- Elevation: 957.8 m (3,142 ft)
- Listing: List of mountains and hills of Japan by height
- Coordinates: 42°8′16″N 143°2′9″E

Geography
- Location: Hokkaidō, Japan
- Parent range: Hidaka Mountains
- Topo map(s): Geospatial Information Authority of Japan (国土地理院, Kokudochiriin) 25000:1 アポイ岳; 50000:1 広尾

Geology
- Mountain type: Fold

Pinneshiri (ピンネシリ, Pinneshiri) is a mountain located in the Hidaka Mountains, Hokkaidō, Japan. The mountain is made from ultramafic rock of unknown age.
