= Mount Kitatottabetsu =

Mountain in Japan

- 北戸蔦別岳
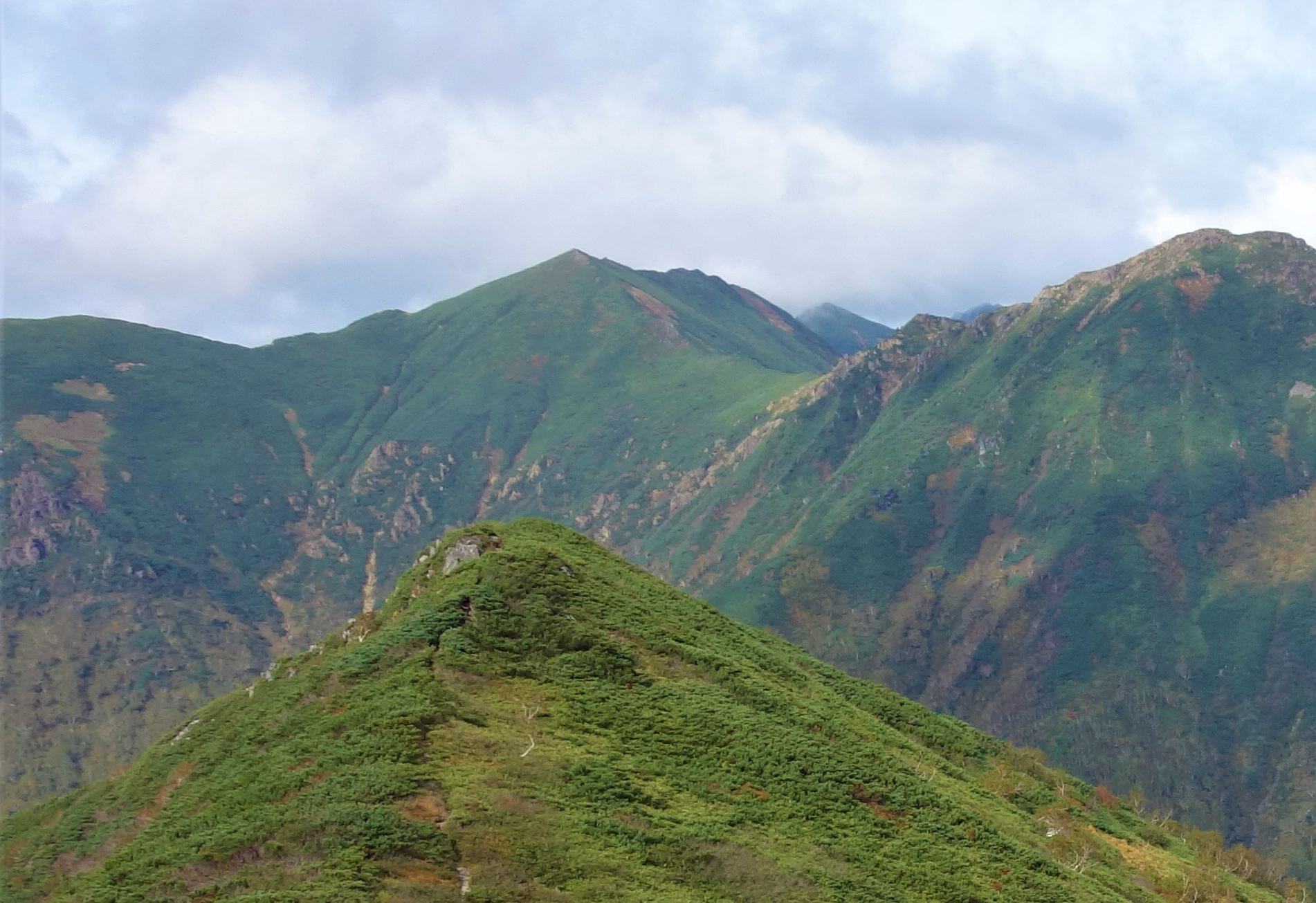
- Mount Kitatottabetsu

Highest point
- Elevation: 1,912 m (6,273 ft)
- Listing: List of mountains and hills of Japan by height
- Coordinates: 42.7504410°N 142.6870780°E

Geography
- Location: Hokkaido, Japan
- Parent range: Hidaka Mountains
- Topo map(s): Geographical Survey Institute (国土地理院, Kokudochiriin) 25000:1 ピパイロ岳

Geology
- Mountain type: Fold

Mount Kitatottabetsu (北戸蔦別岳, Kita-tottabetsu-dake) or Mount North Tottabetsu is located in the Hidaka Mountains, Hokkaido, Japan.
