= Mount Tomuraushi (Hidaka) =

Japanese montain

- トムラウシ山

Highest point
- Elevation: 1,476.7 m (4,845 ft)
- Listing: List of mountains and hills of Japan by height
- Coordinates: 42°48′3″N 142°46′25″E

Geography
- Location: Hokkaidō, Japan
- Parent range: Hidaka Mountains
- Topo map(s): Geographical Survey Institute (国土地理院, Kokudochiriin); 25000:1 妙敷山, 50000:1 札内岳

Geology
- Mountain type: Fold

Mount Tomuraushi (トムラウシ山, Tomuraushi-san) is a dormant volcano located in the Hidaka Mountains, Hokkaidō, Japan. It has not erupted in the last 10,000 years and was active about 1.1-0.1 million years ago. It is at an elevation of 1,476.7 metres (4,845 ft) above sea level.
