= Mount Nakano =

Mountain in Japan

- 中ノ岳

Highest point
- Elevation: 1,519 m (4,984 ft)
- Listing: List of mountains and hills of Japan by height
- Coordinates: 42°28′5″N 142°53′4″E

Naming
- English translation: middle mountain
- Language of name: Japanese

Geography
- Location: Hokkaido, Japan
- Parent range: Hidaka Mountains
- Topo map(s): Geographical Survey Institute (国土地理院, Kokudochiriin) 25000:1 神威岳

Geology
- Mountain type: Fold

Mount Nakano (中ノ岳, Nakano-dake) is a mountain in Hokkaido, Japan. It is located in the Hidaka Mountains range, and its peak is 1,519 meters above sea level.
