= Mount Tokachiporoshiri =

Mountain in Hokkaido, Japan

Mount Tokachiporshiri
- 十勝幌尻岳
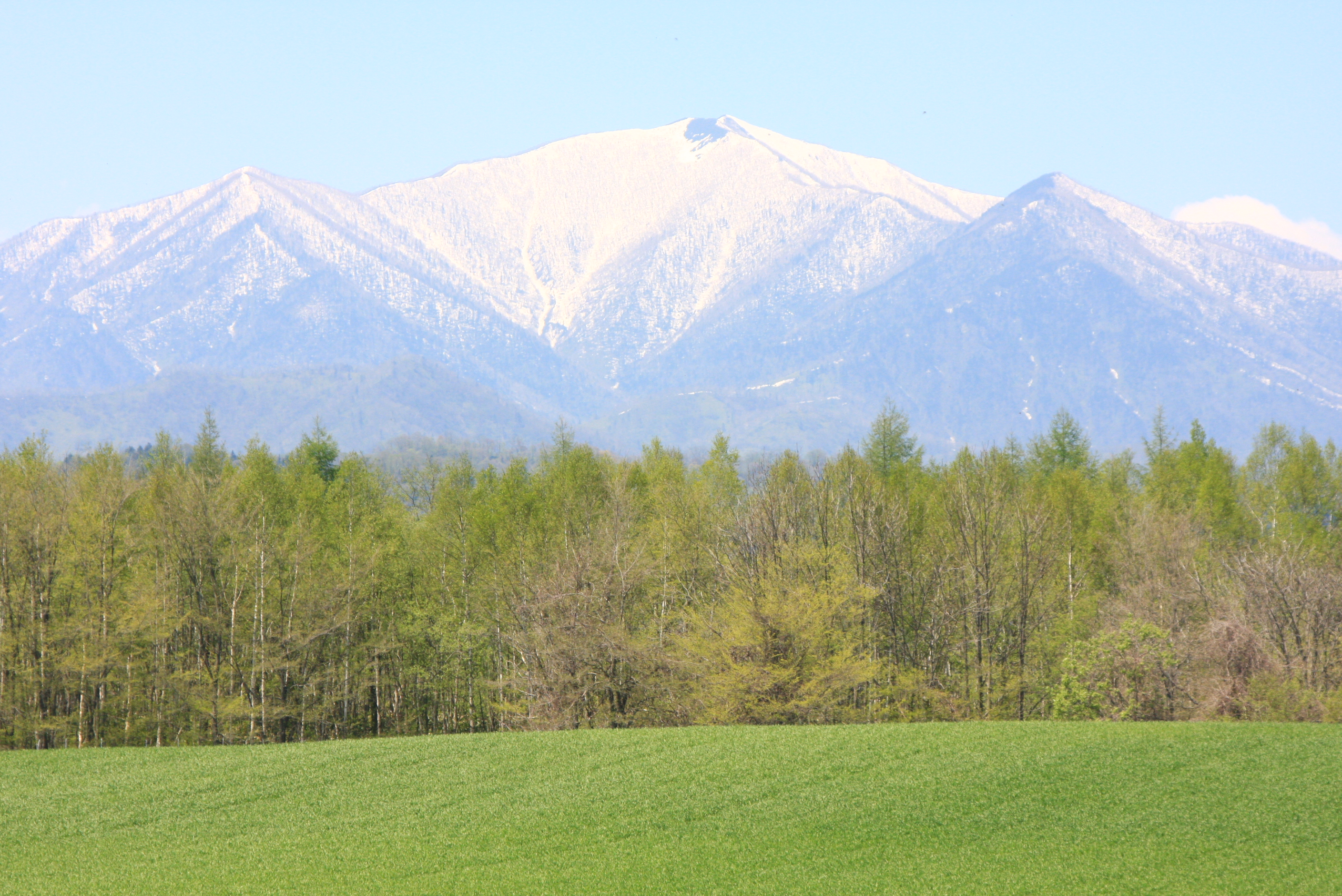
- A view from Nakasatsunai Village

Highest point
- Elevation: 1,846.0 m (6,056.4 ft)
- Listing: List of mountains and hills of Japan by height
- Coordinates: 42°41′44″N 142°51′34″E

Geography
- Location: Hokkaidō, Japan
- Parent range: Hidaka Mountains
- Topo map(s): Geographical Survey Institute (国土地理院, Kokudochiriin) 25000:1 札内岳, 50000:1 札内岳

Geology
- Mountain type: Fold

Mount Tokachiporoshiri (十勝幌尻岳, Tokachiporoshiri-dake) is located in the Hidaka Mountains, Hokkaidō, Japan.
