= Mount Kamui (Urakawa-Hiroo) =

Mountain in Hidaka Mountains, Hokkaido, Japan

- 神威岳
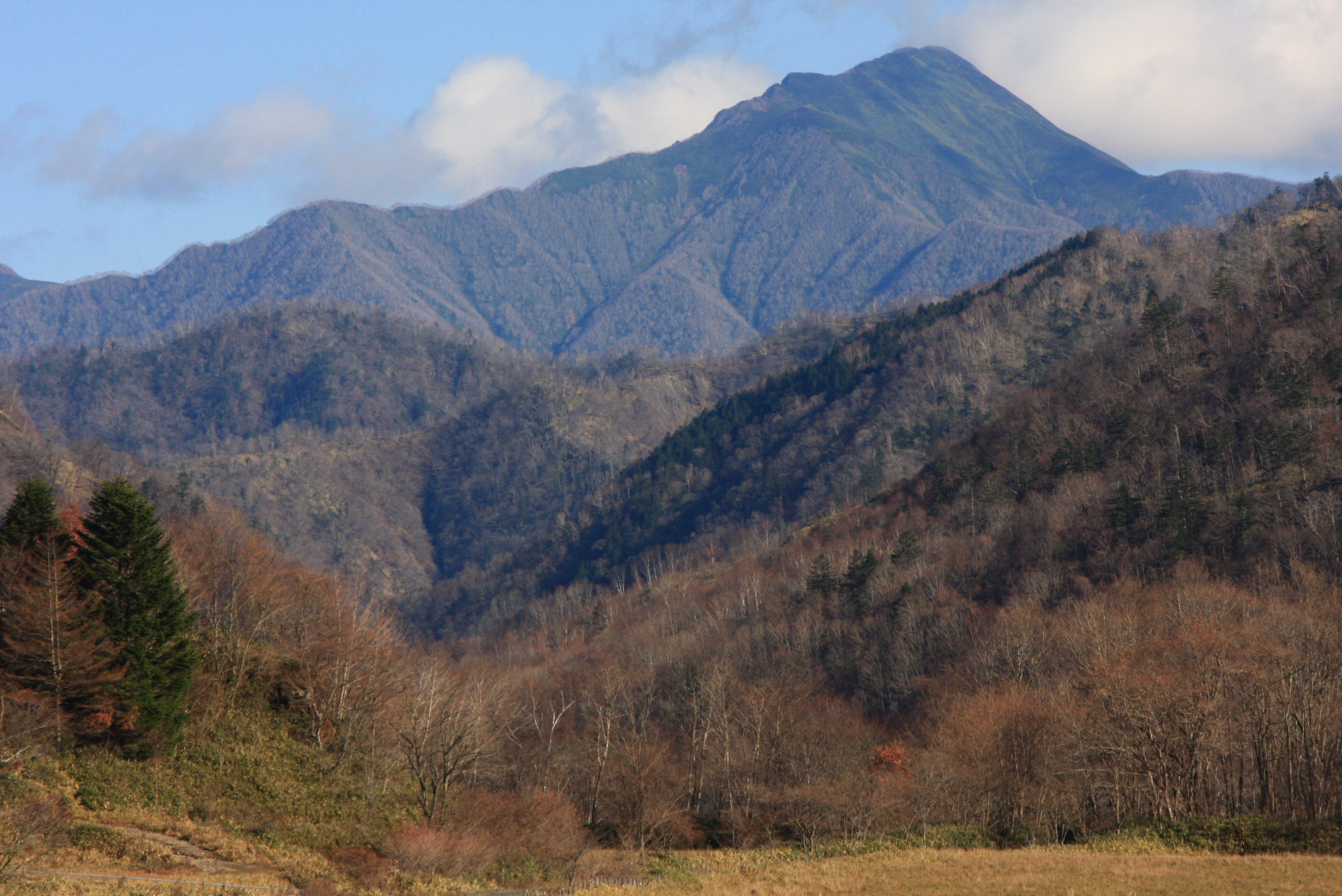
- A view from Motourakawa River

Highest point
- Elevation: 1,600.5 m (5,251 ft)
- Listing: List of mountains and hills of Japan by height
- Coordinates: 42°25′42″N 142°54′24″E

Naming
- English translation: Mountain of the Gods
- Language of name: Ainu

Geography
- Location: Hokkaidō, Japan
- Parent range: Hidaka Mountains
- Topo map(s): Geographical Survey Institute (国土地理院, Kokudochiriin) 25000:1 神威岳, 50000:1 神威岳

Geology
- Mountain type: Fold

Mount Kamui (神威岳, kamuidake) is located in the Hidaka Mountains, Hokkaidō, Japan.
