= Tanjō =

Tanjō may refer to:

- Mount Tanjō, a mountain in Hyōgo, Japan
- Tanjō Mountains, a mountain range in Japan, including Mount Tanjō
- Tanjō-ji, a Buddhist temple in Chiba, Japan
- Renge-in Tanjō-ji, a Buddhist temple in Kumamoto, Japan
- alternative name for tanbō, a short staff weapon
