= Mount Chigogabaka =

- 稚児ヶ墓山
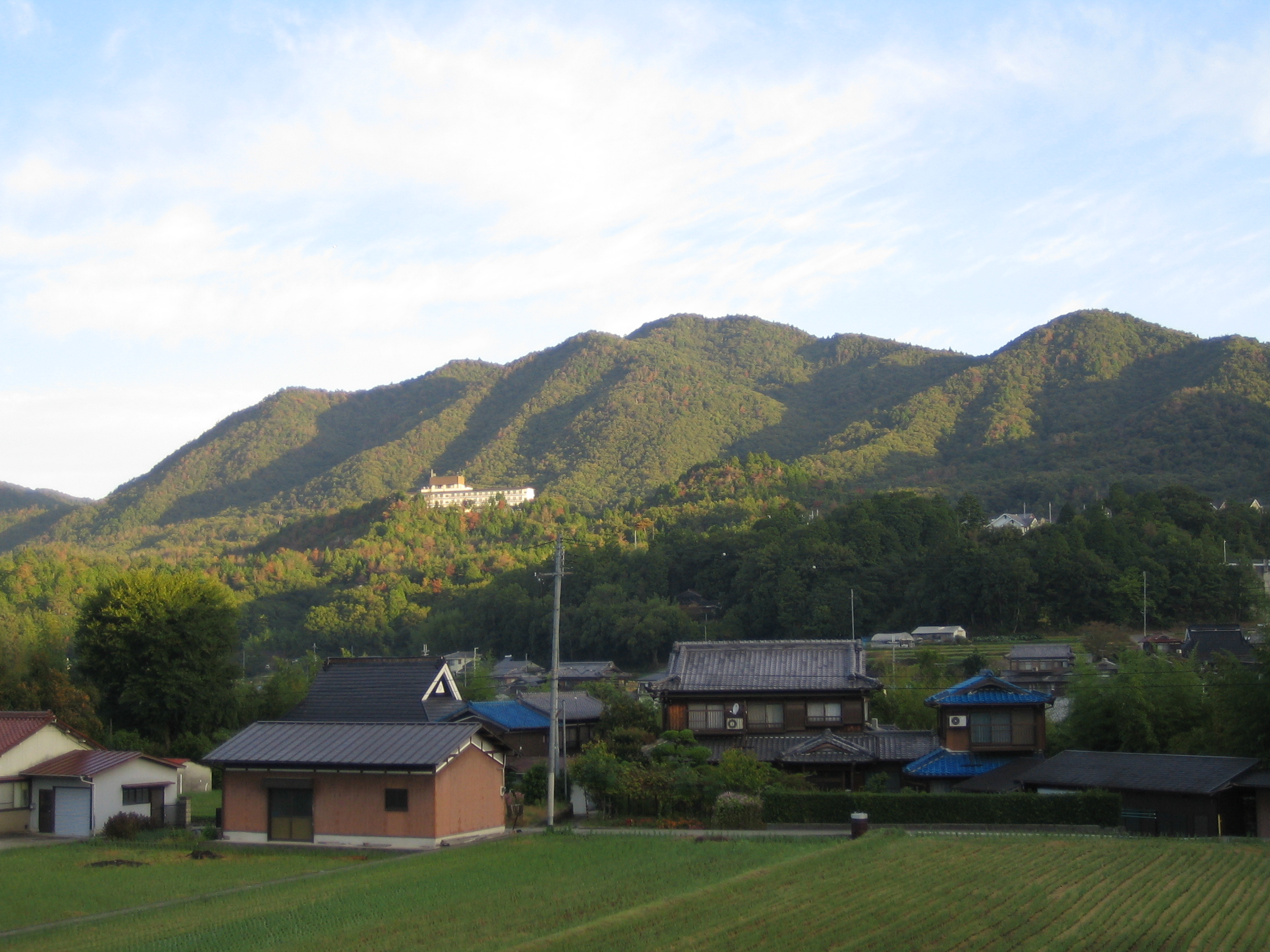
- Mount Chigogabaka from southside

Highest point
- Elevation: 596.3 m (1,956 ft)
- Coordinates: 35°27′N 139°9′E

Naming
- Language of name: Japanese
- Pronunciation: [tɕiɡoɡabakajama]

Geography
- Location: Iwatani, Yamada, Kita-ku, Kobe, Hyōgo, Japan
- Parent range: Tanjō Mountains

Mount Chigogabaka (稚児ヶ墓山, Chigogabaka-yama) is a 596.3 m (1,956 ft) mountain of Tanjō Mountains, located Iwatani, Yamada, Kita-ku, Kobe, Hyōgo, Japan.

== Outline and History ==
Mount Chigogabaka is the tallest mountain of Tanjō Mountains, which itself is a part of Rokkō Mountains. The name ‘Chigogabaka’ literally means ‘a tomb of Children’. Actually there is a tomb of children just near the top of this mountain. These children were said to be killed by soldiers of Toyotomi Hideyoshi, who was under control of Oda Nobunaga around 1580. At the time there is an influential Buddhist temple called Myōyōji, on the top of Mount Tanjō, and the temple was on the side of Bessho Nagaharu in Miki Castle, when Hideyoshi attacked Nagaharu. Hideyoshi burned the temple and killed many monks and their families brutally. The people around the temple pitied the victims and especially the children and made their tomb on the top of this mountain.

== Access ==
- Ōtaki Bus Stop of Kobe City Bus

== Gallery ==
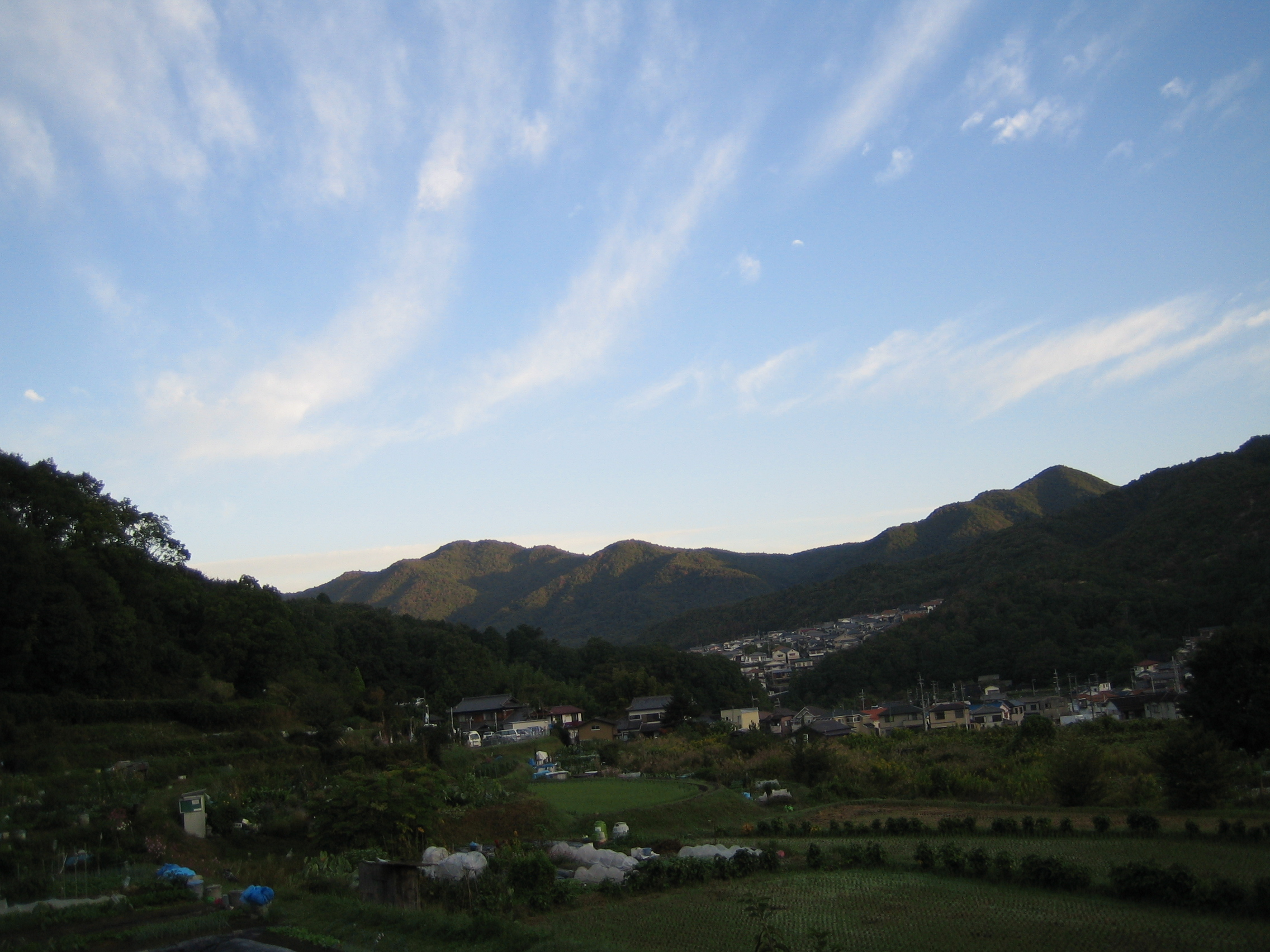
Tanjō Mountains early in the morning (10/2008)

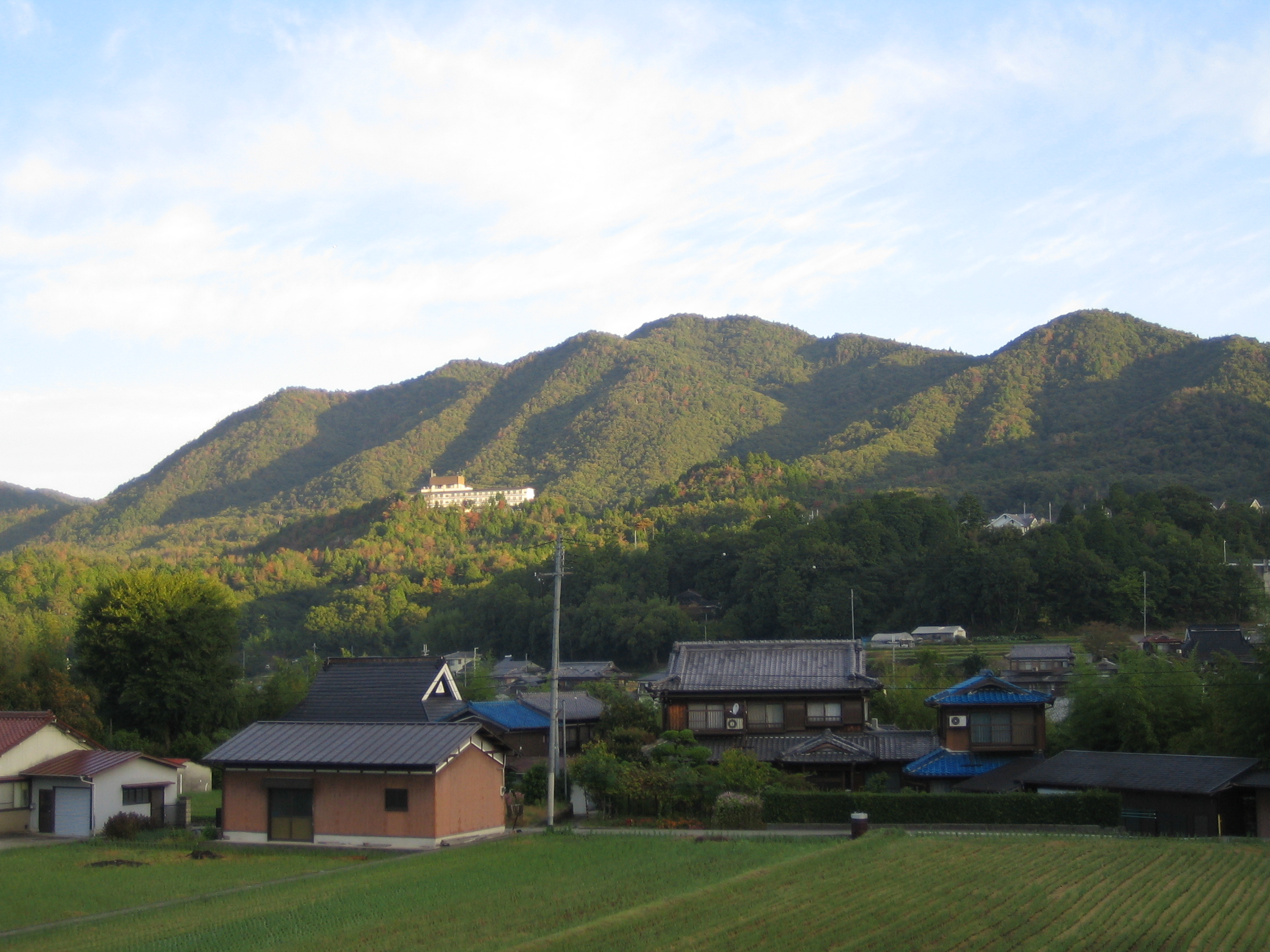
Mount Chigogabaka from south side (10/2008)

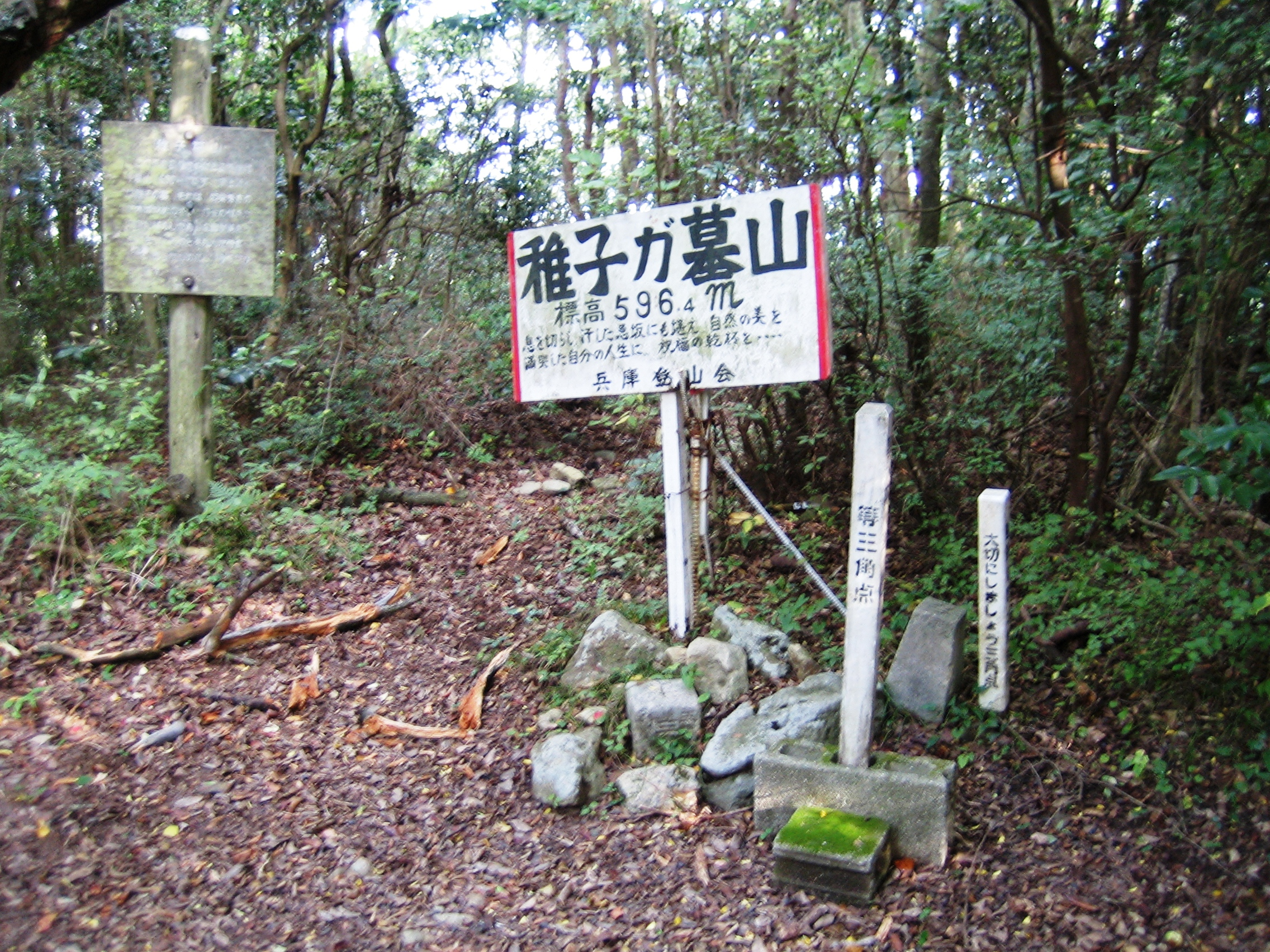
The top of Mount Chigogabaka (10/2008)
