= Mount Taishaku =

Mountain in Kobe, Hyōgo Prefecture, Japan

- 帝釈山
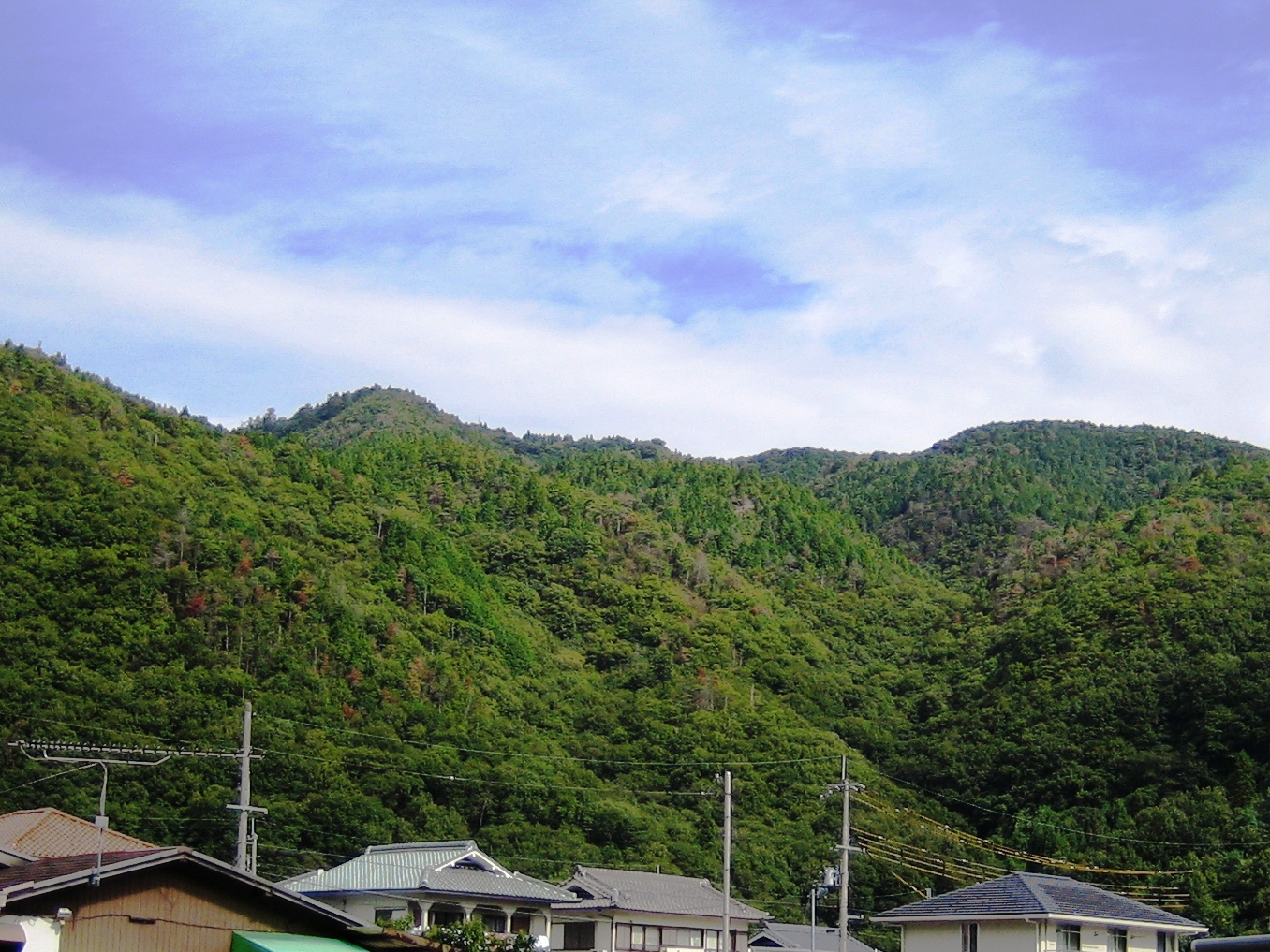
- Mount Tanjō and Mount Taishaku from Tsukihara (10/2008)

Highest point
- Elevation: 585.9 m (1,922 ft)
- Coordinates: 34°47′N 135°7′E

Naming
- Language of name: Japanese
- Pronunciation: [taiɕakɯ̥saɴ]

Geography
- Location: Sakamoto, Yamada, Kita-ku, Kobe, Hyōgo, Japan
- Parent range: Tanjō Mountains

Mount Taishaku (帝釈山, Taishaku-san) is a 585.9 m (1,922 ft) mountain of Tanjō Mountains, located in Sakamoto, Yamada, Kita-ku, Kobe, Hyōgo, Japan.

== Outline and History ==
Mount Taishaku is the second tallest mountain of Tanjō Mountains, which itself is a part of Rokkō Mountains. The name 'Taishaku' comes from Śakra a deity of Budhsim. At the top of this mountain, there was the Okuno-in of the Myōyōji temple and at the Okuno-in it is said that a sculpture of Śakra was set up.

== Access ==
- Tanjō Jinja Mae Bus Stop of Kobe City Bus
- Tsukihara Bus Stop of Kobe City Bus

== Gallery ==
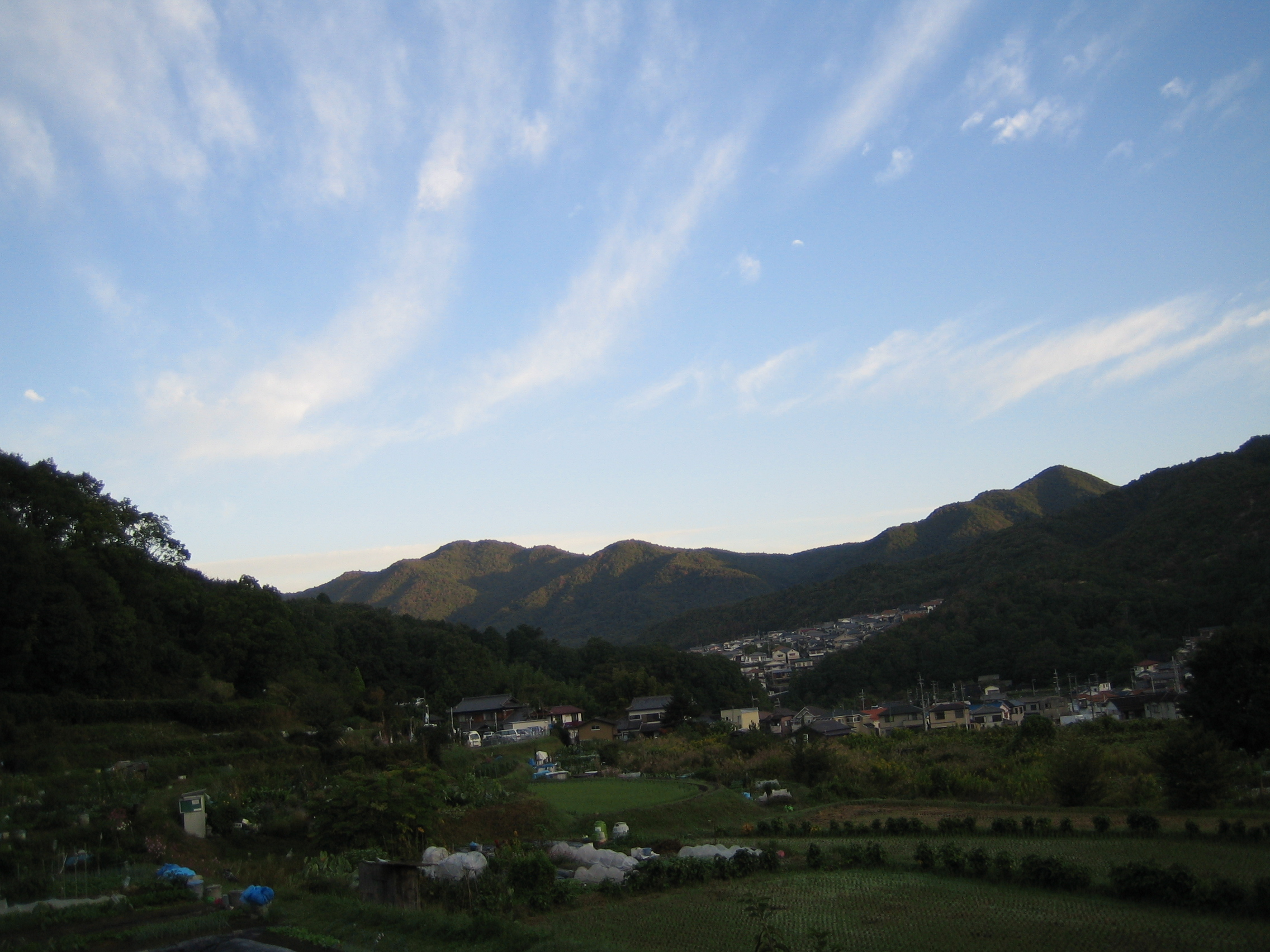
Tanjō Mountains early in the morning (October 2008)

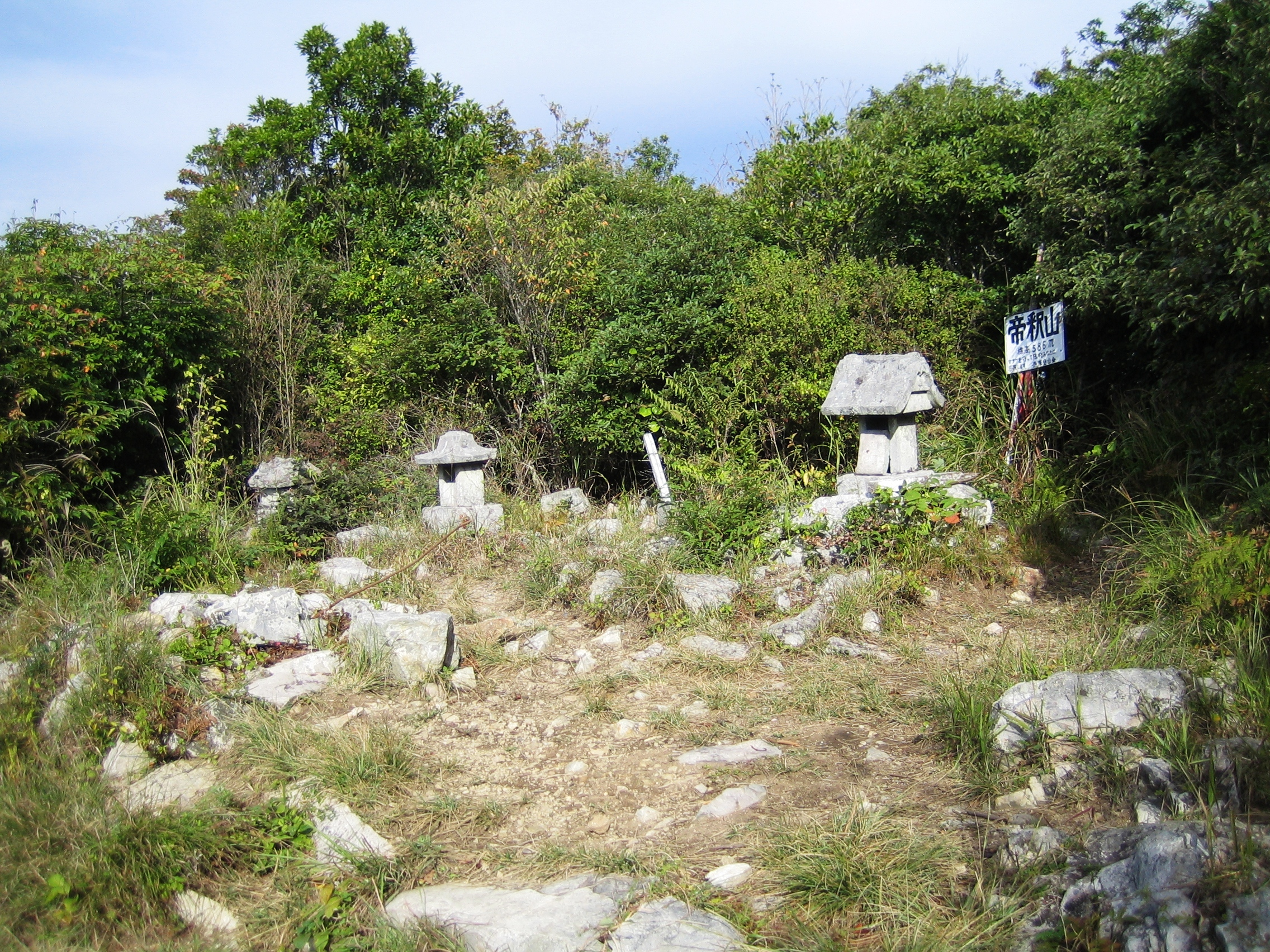
Religious objects at the top of Mount Taishaku (October 2008)

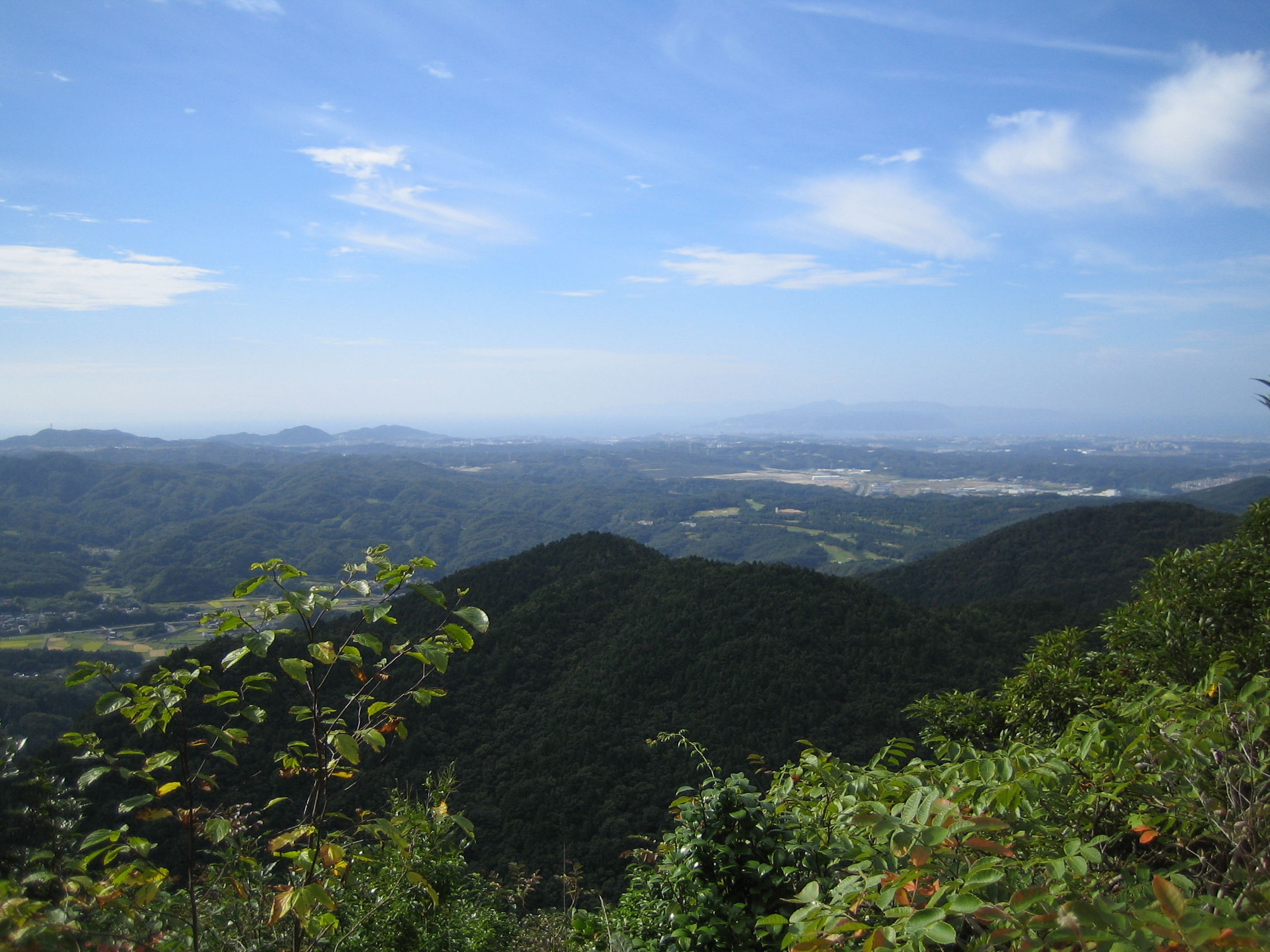
South view from the top of Mount Taishaku (October 2008)

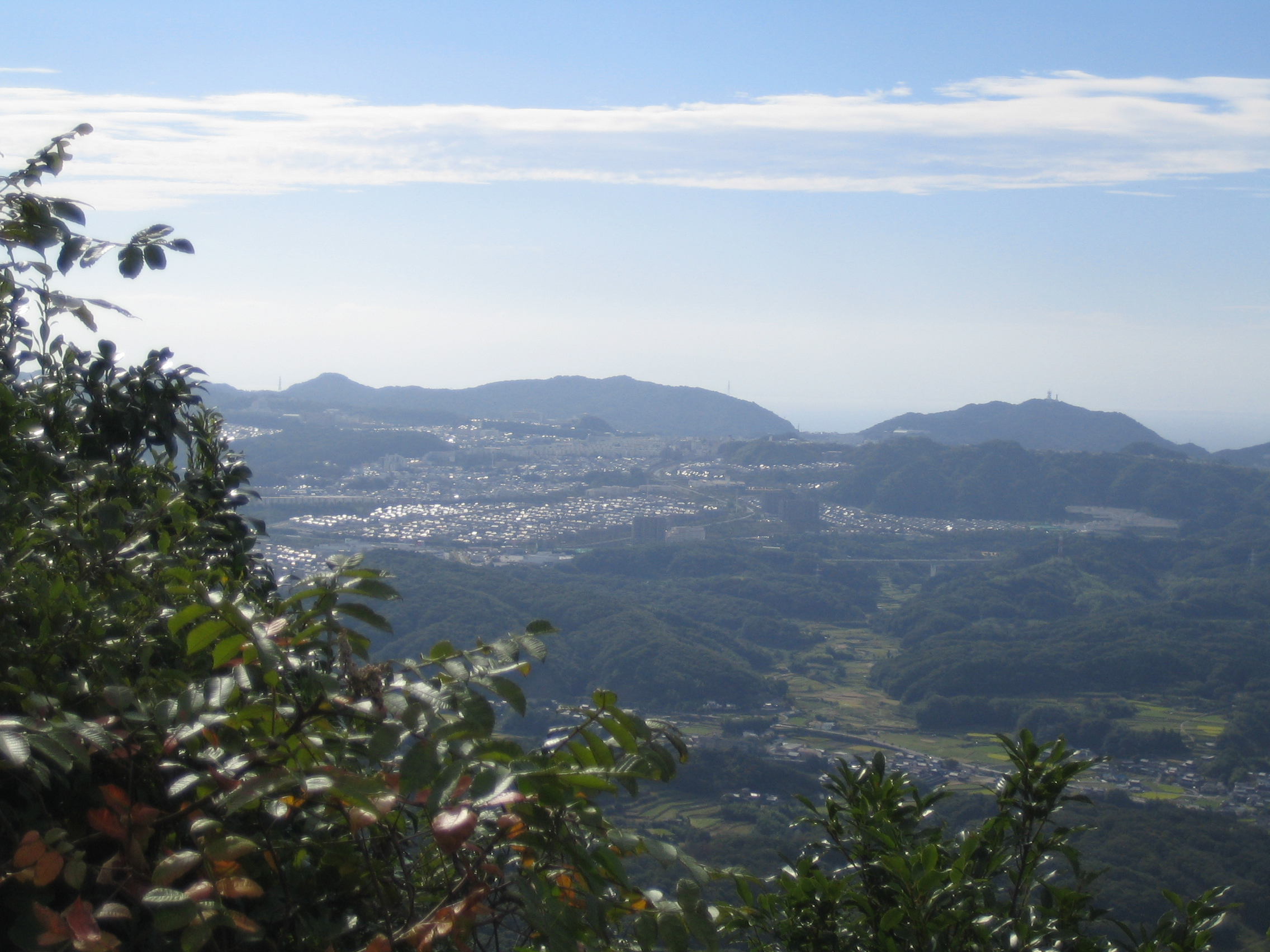
West view from the top of Mount Taishaku (October 2008)
