= Mount Tanjō =

Mountain in Kobe, Hyōgo, Japan

- 丹生山
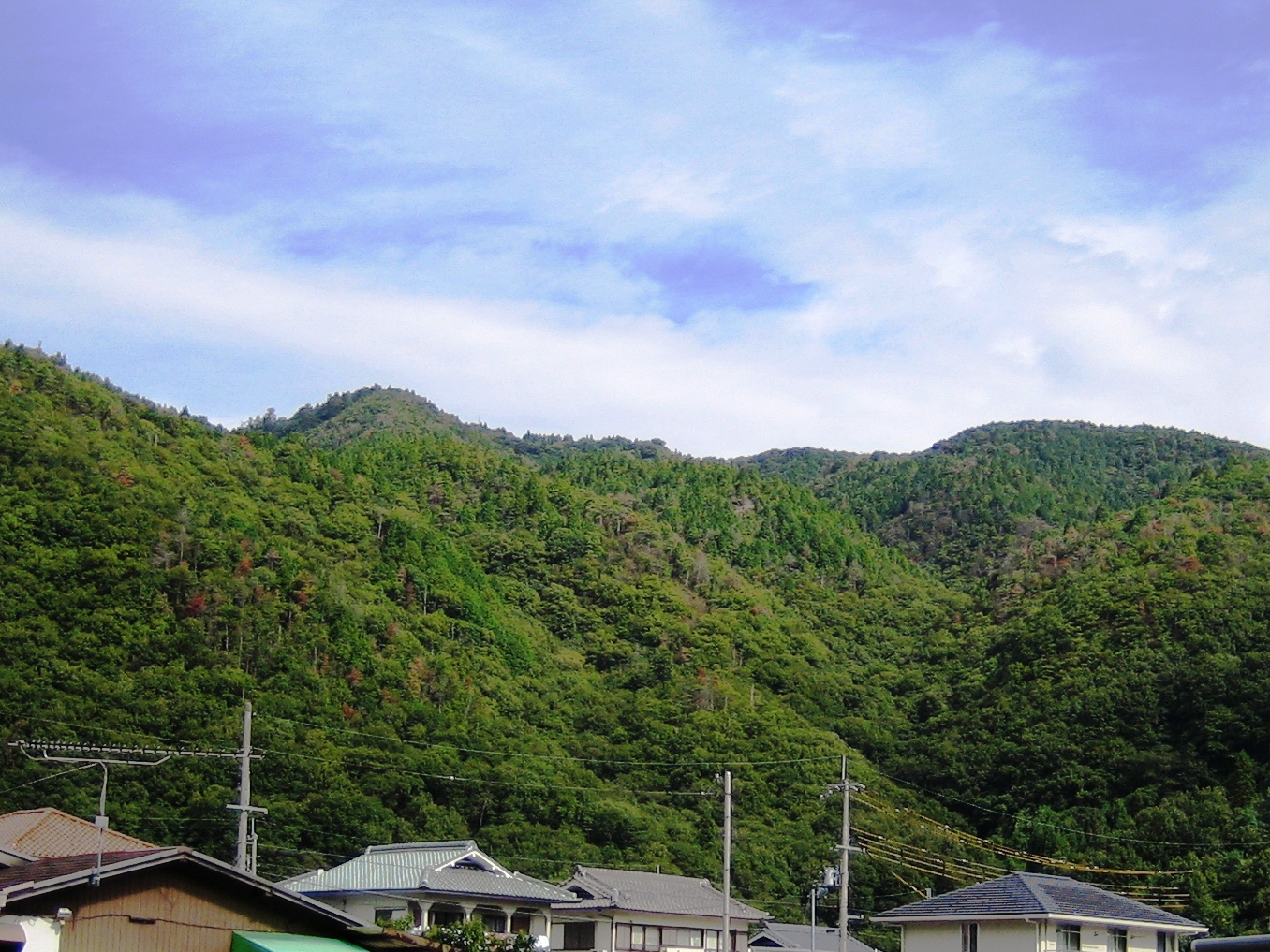
- Mount Tanjō seen from the south

Highest point
- Elevation: 514 m (1,686 ft)
- Coordinates: 34°46′N 135°6′E

Naming
- Language of name: Japanese
- Pronunciation: [tandʑoːsaɴ]

Geography
- Location within Japan
- Location: Sakamoto, Yamada, Kita-ku, Kobe, Hyōgo, Japan
- Parent range: Tanjō Mountains

Mount Tanjō (丹生山, Tanjō-san) is a 514 m (1,686 ft) mountain in the Tanjō Mountains, located in Sakamoto, Yamada, Kita-ku, Kobe, Hyōgo, Japan.

== Outline and History ==
Mount Tanjō is not the tallest mountain of Tanjō Mountains, but it is a symbol of the mountain range. In the middle of the mountain, there was a Buddhist temple Myōyō-ji which was said to be established by Donan-Gyoja, a prince of King Seong of Baekje. Today's Tanjō Shrine is believed to be part of the original temple. Mount Tanjō is also believed to have been old source of mercury, because the name Tanjō, originally means Nyu, mercury. Tanjō Shrine is a place to enshrine a goddess of mercury.

== Access ==
- Tanjō Jinja Mae Bus Stop of Kobe City Bus
- Tsukihara Bus Stop of Kobe City Bus

== Gallery ==
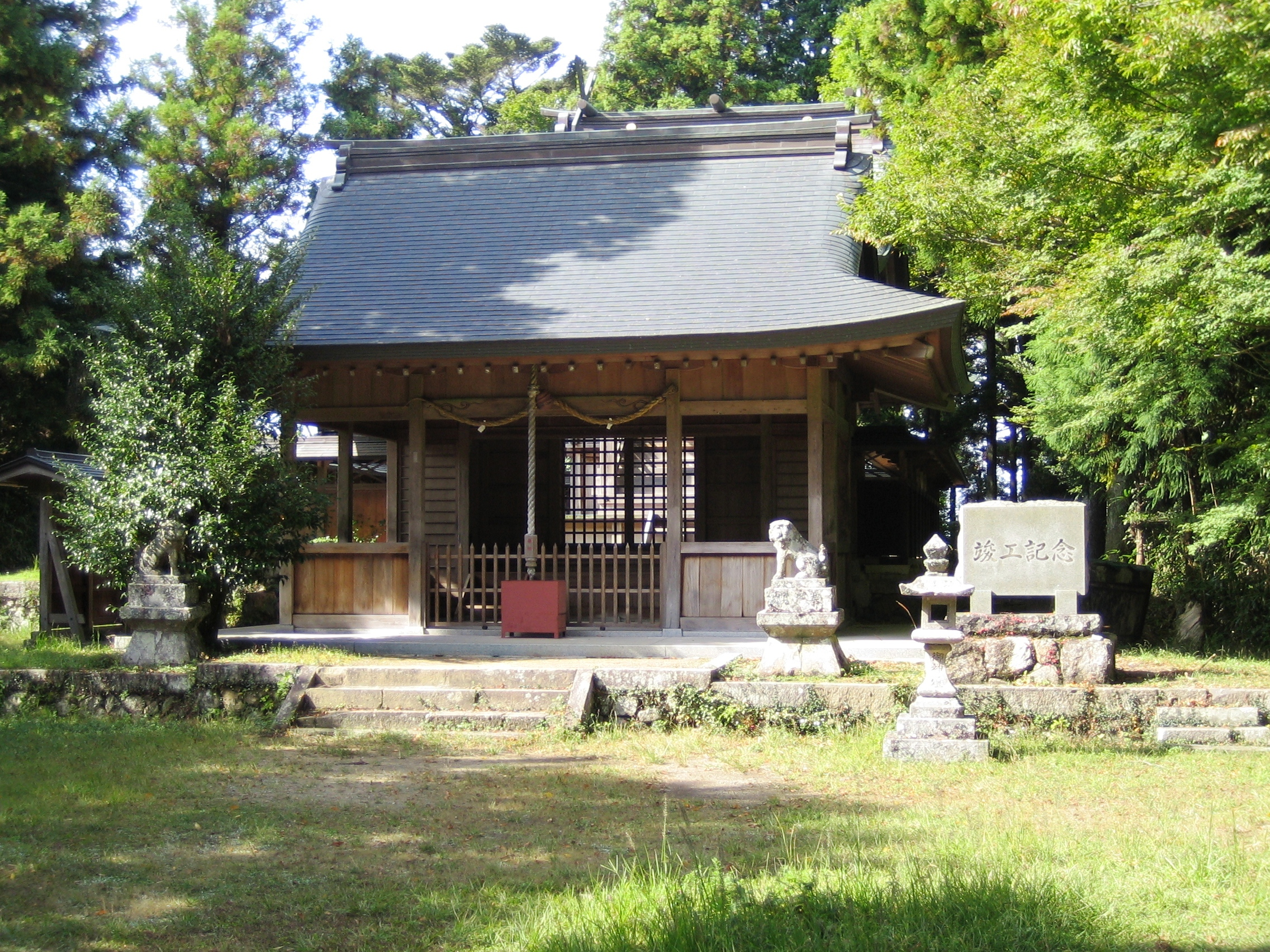
Tanjō Shrine at the top of Mount Tanjo

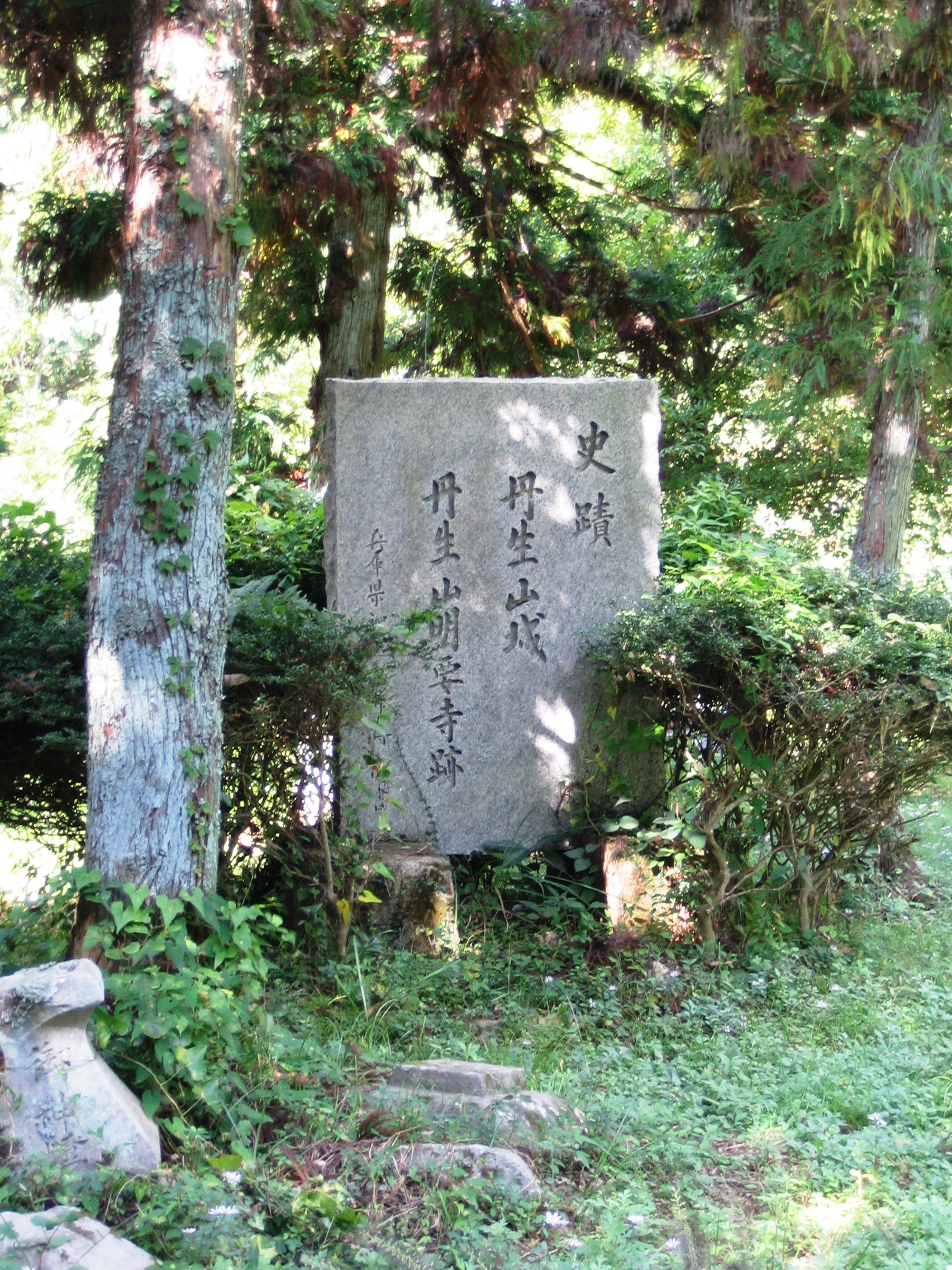
Monument of Mount Tanjo Castle

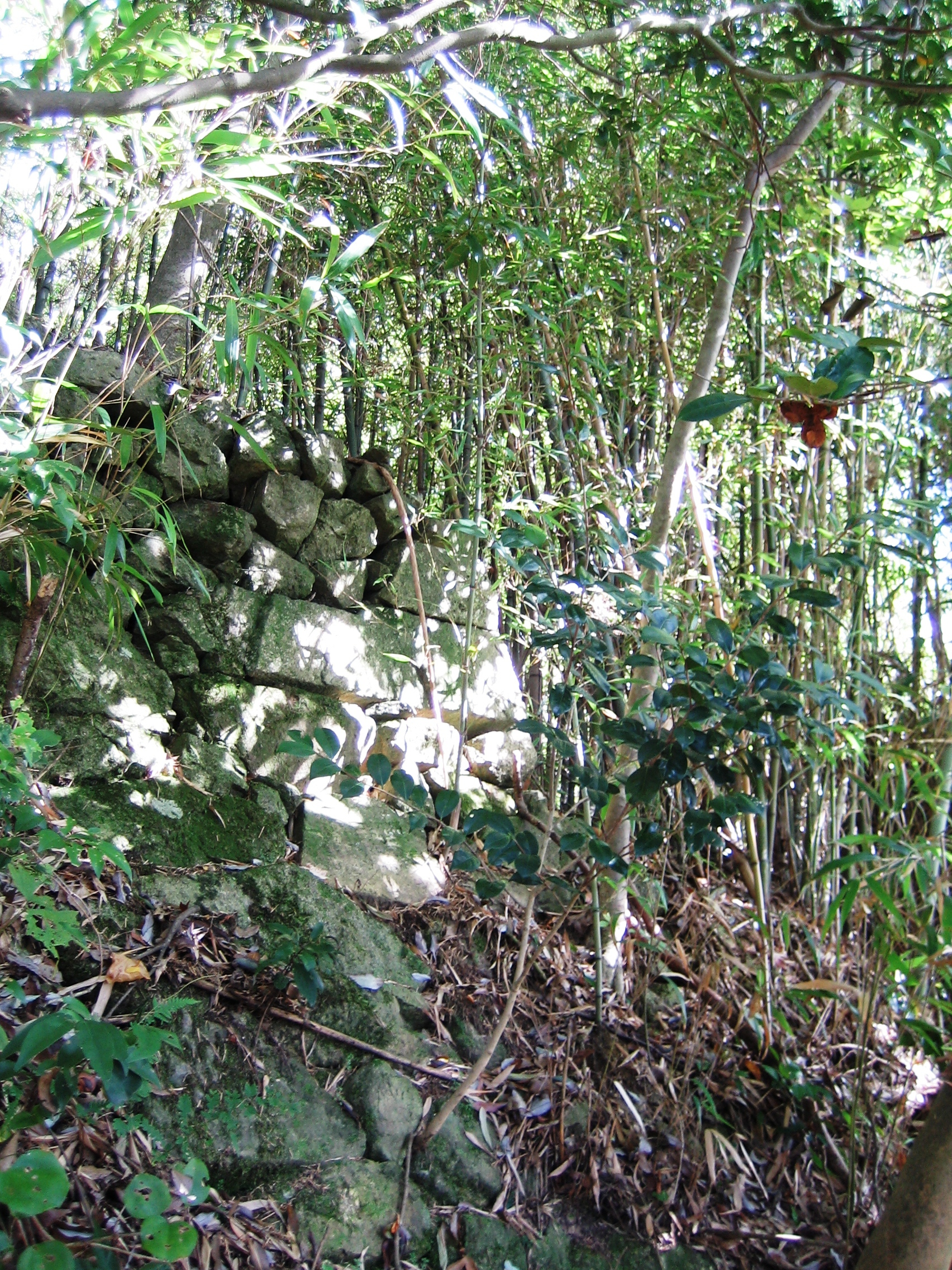
Ruins of Mount Tanjo Castle

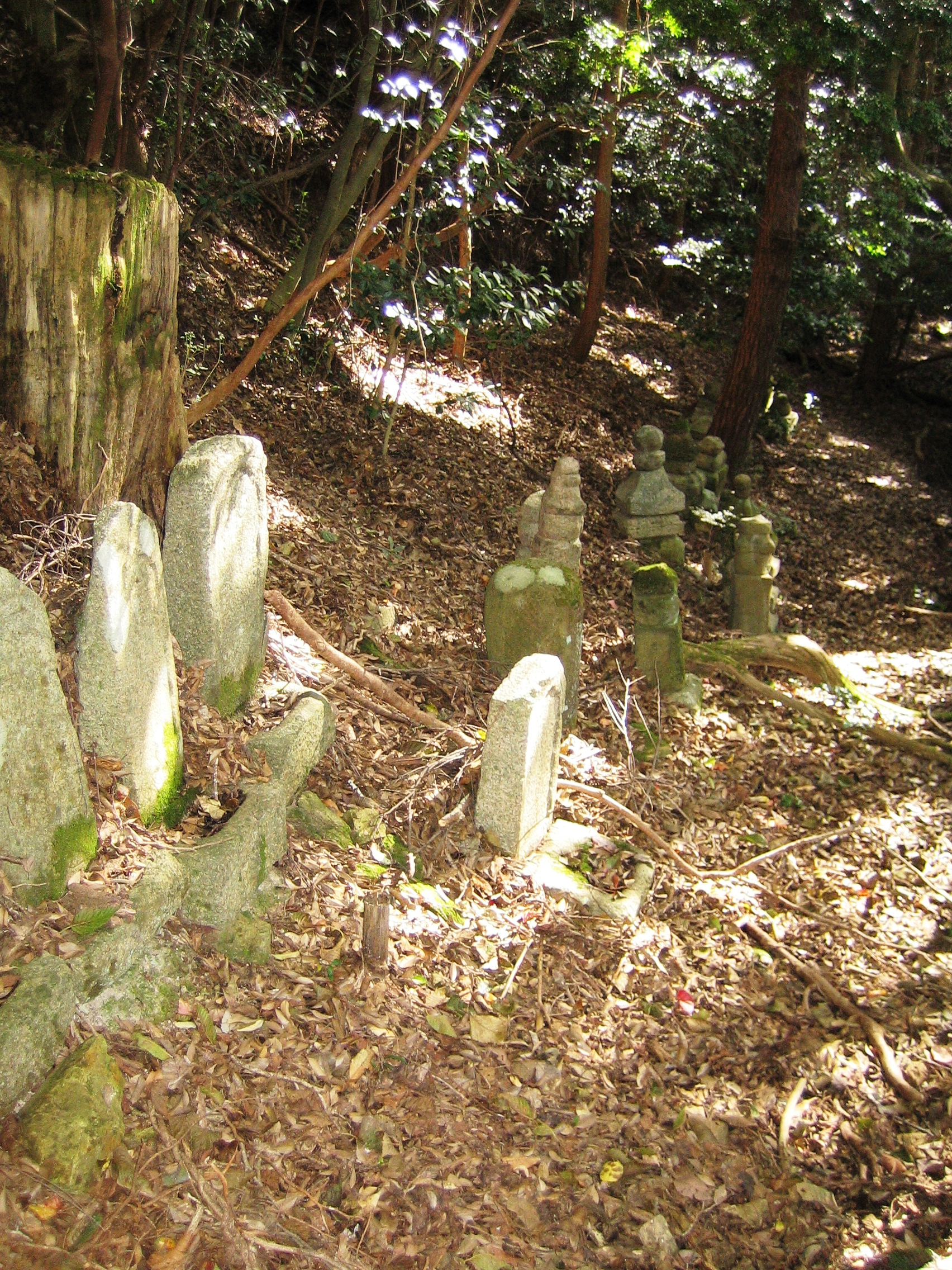
Ruins of Myōyōji Temple

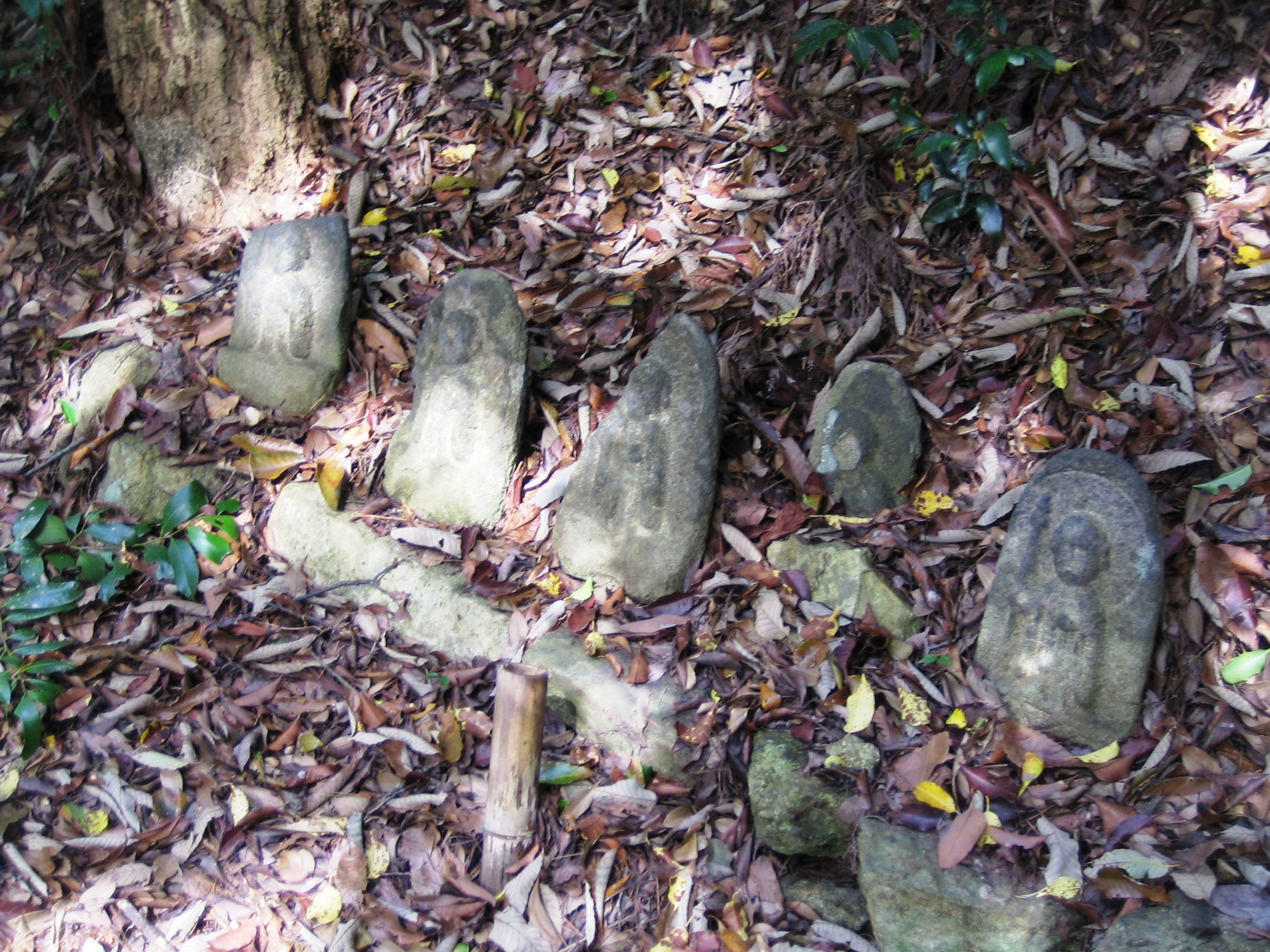
Ruins of Myōyōji Temple
