= Tanjō Mountains =

Mountain range in Hyogo Prefecture, Japan

Coordinates: 34°47′04″N 135°06′29″E

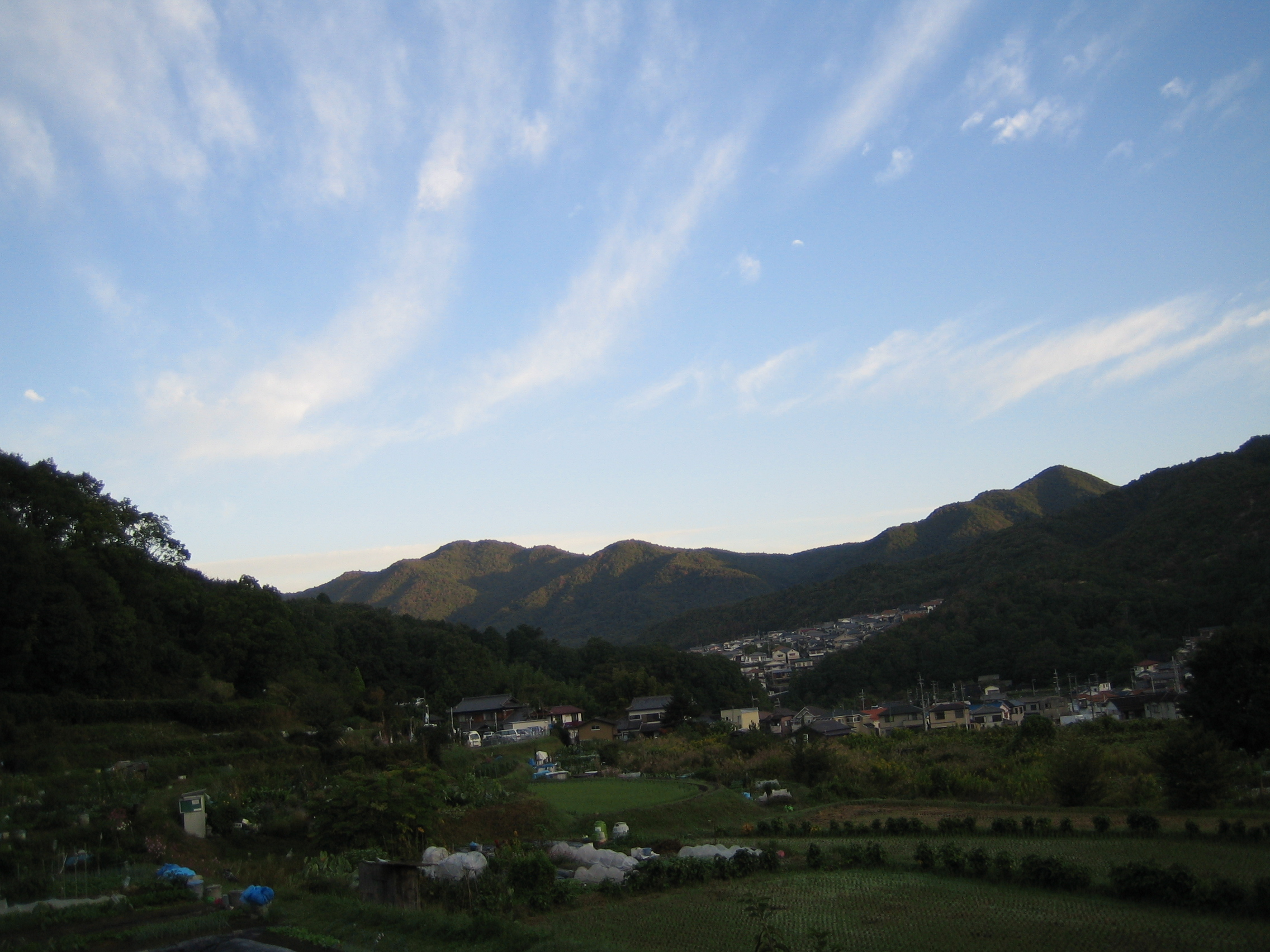
Tanjō Mountains early in the morning (10/2008)

The Tanjō Mountains (丹生山系) or Tanjō-Taishaku Mountains are in Kita-ku, Kobe, Hyōgo, Japan. The length of the mountain range is about 17 km. Tanjō and Taishaku are two major mountains in this mountain range.

== Mountains ==
- Mount Tanjō
- Mount Taishaku
- Mount Chigogabaka
- Mount Shibire
- Mount Kisurashi

== History ==
The Tanjō range is small but rich in history. The history has deep relation with the temple Myōyō-ji (明要寺), on Mount Tanjō. The name Tanjō, and its older names, Nibu and Nyu, refer to a mine of amalgam at this mountain. The Tanjō Shrine on the top of Mount Tanjō is a place to worship the goddess of amalgam which was believed to inhabit the mountain. Even today, many religious objects may be seen in this mountain range.

However, the Buddhist temples were burned by Toyotomi Hideyoshi in 1580 during a war between Oda Nobunaga and Bessho Nagaharu. Hideyoshi was in the service of Nobunaga, and the Myōyō temple was allied with Nagaharu. The temples were rebuilt by Hideyoshi soon afterward, but were heavily damaged in the Haibutsu kishaku movement of the Meiji period, when Buddhism was persecuted in favor of the native Shinto religion.

== Gallery ==
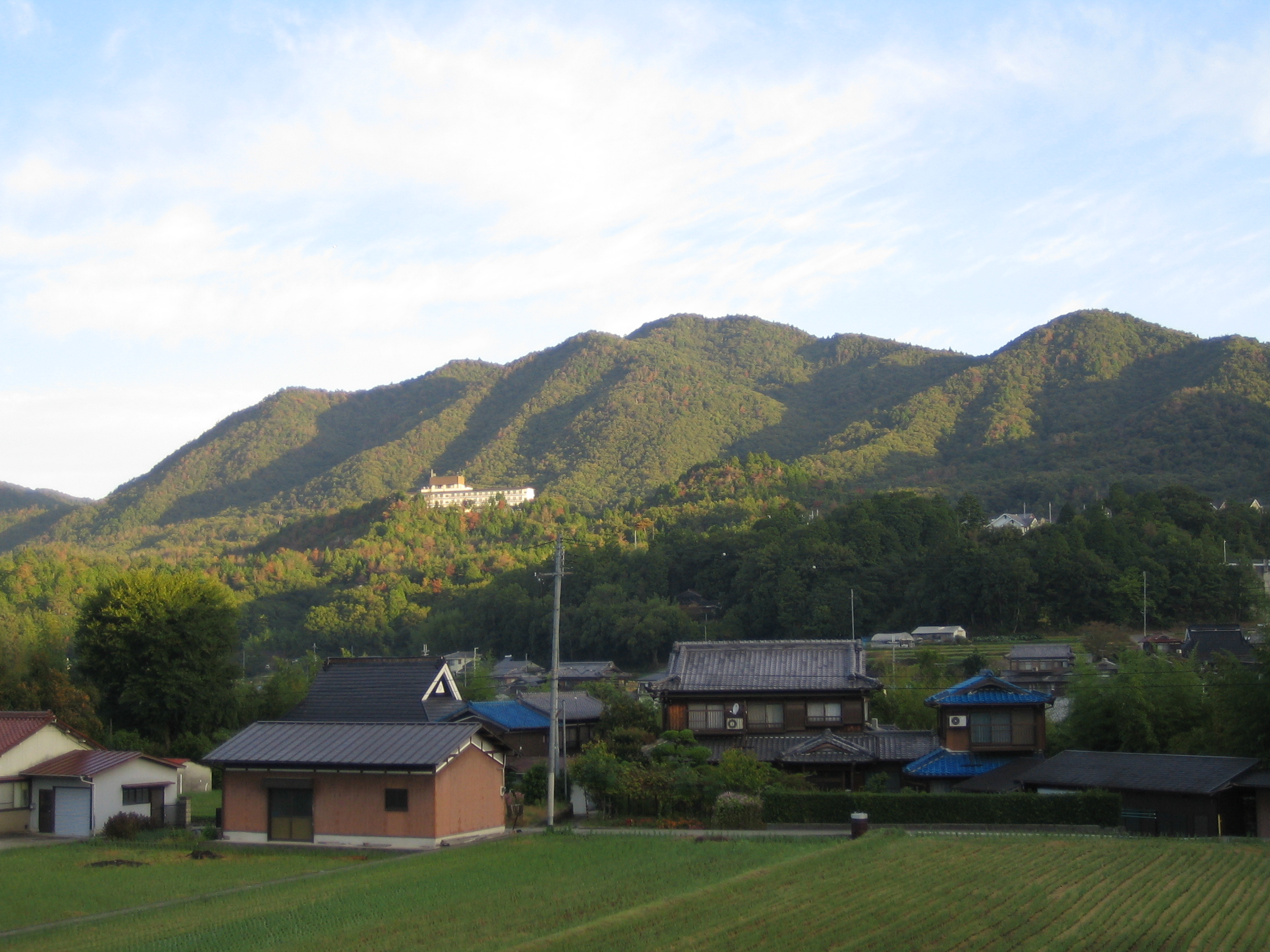
Mount Chigogabaka from south (10/2008)

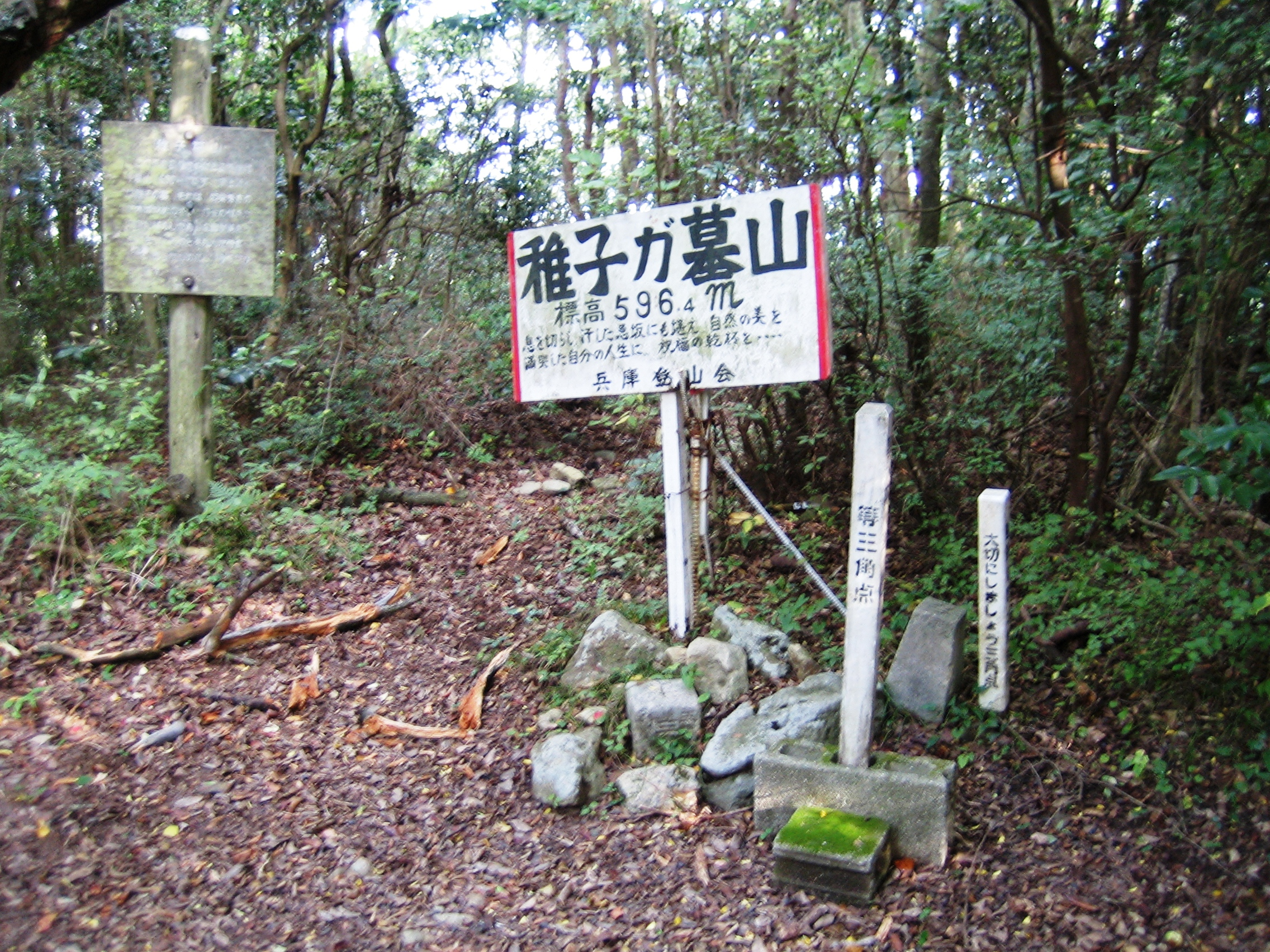
The top of Mount Chigogabaka (10/2008)

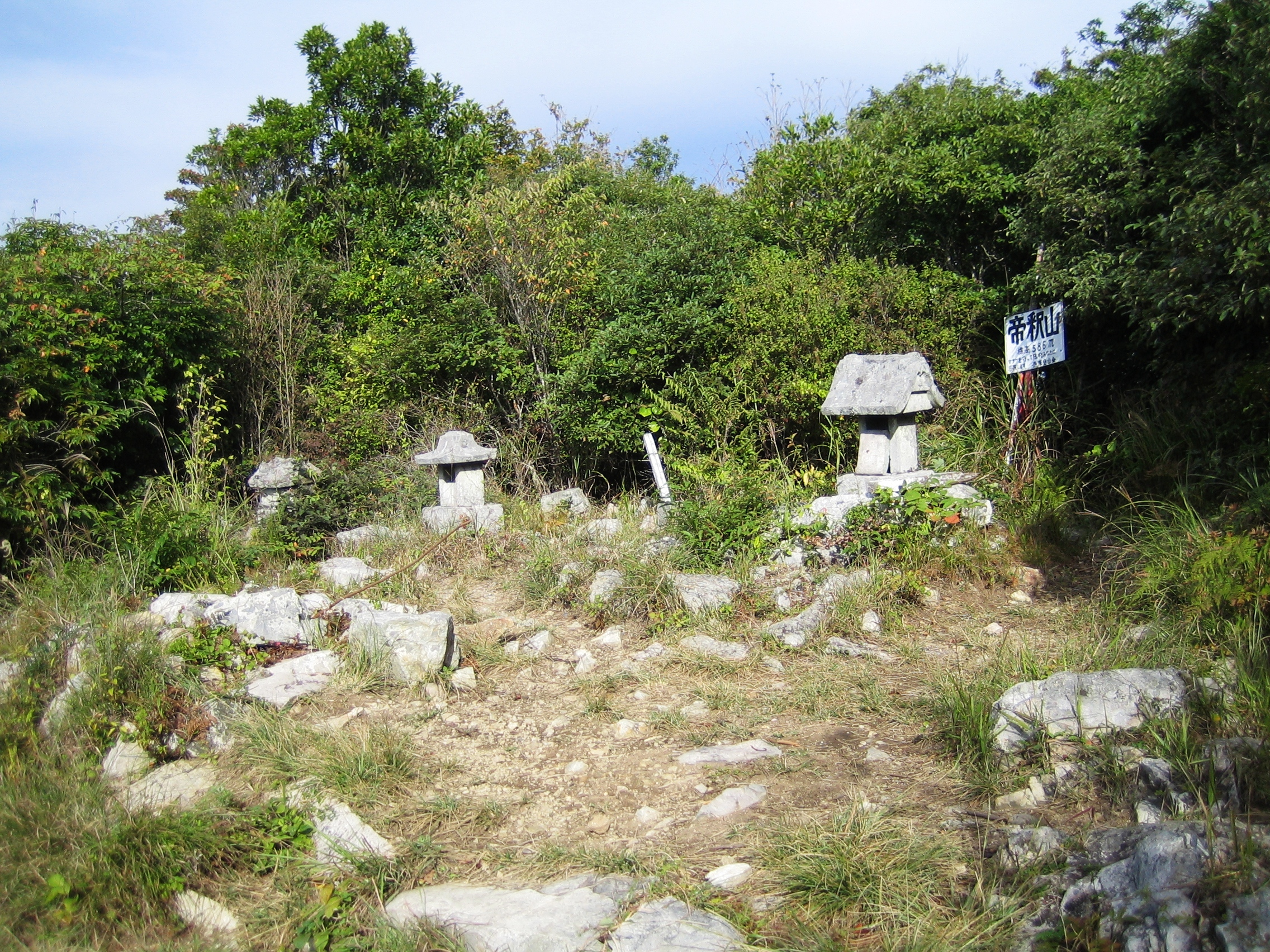
The top of Mount Taishaku (10/2008)

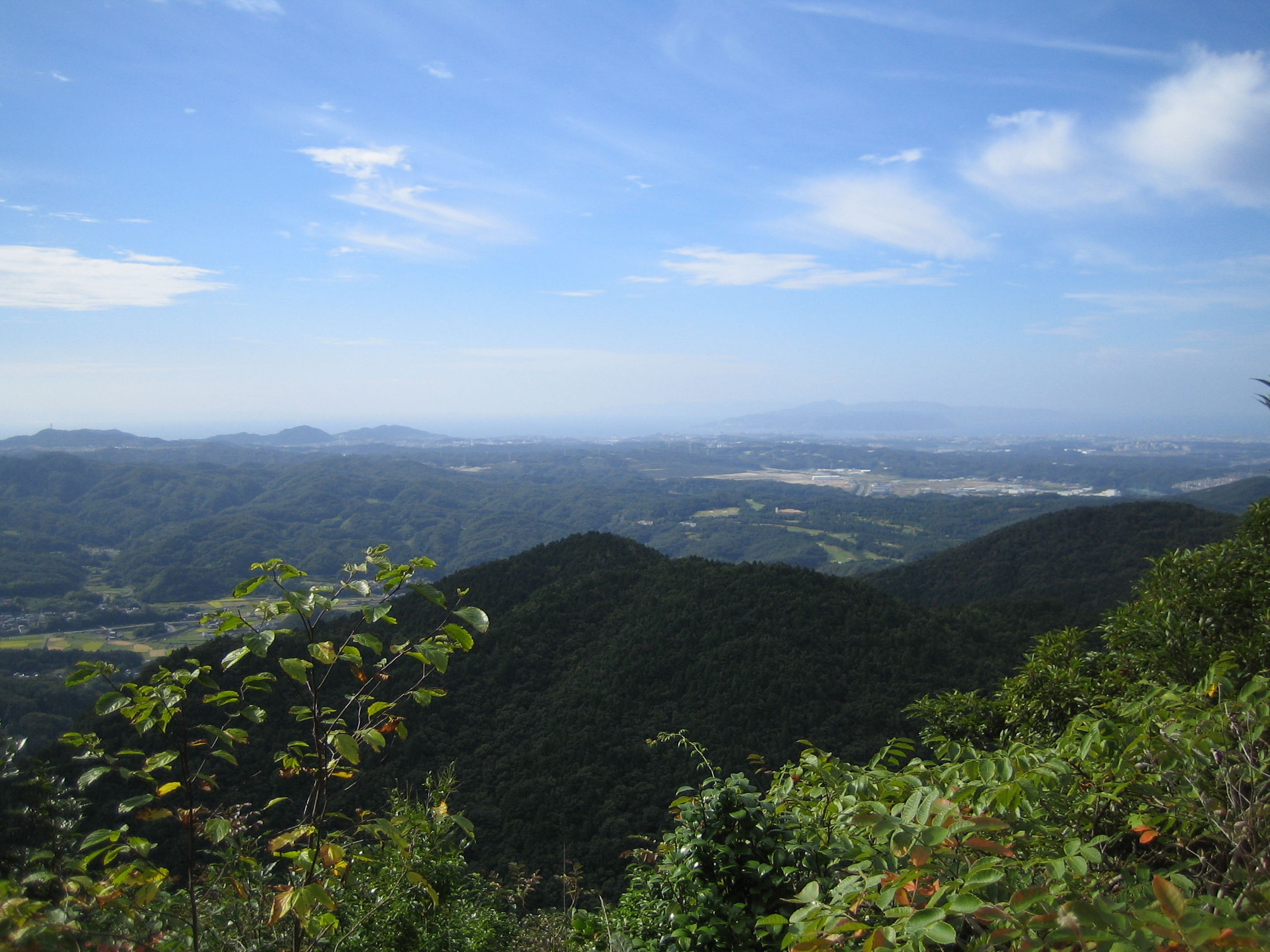
South view from the top of Mount Taishaku (10/2008)

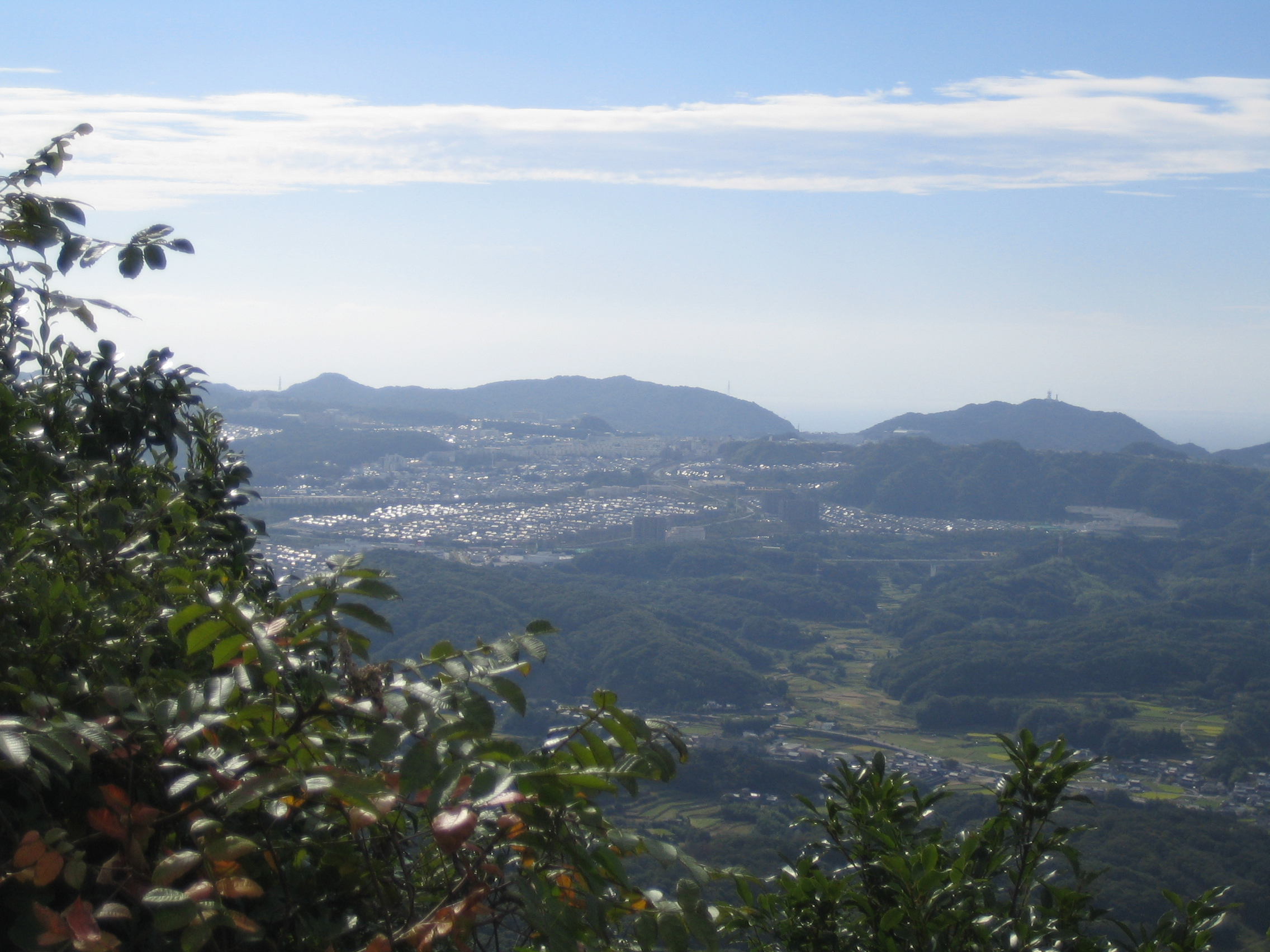
West view from the top of Mount Taishaku(10/2008)

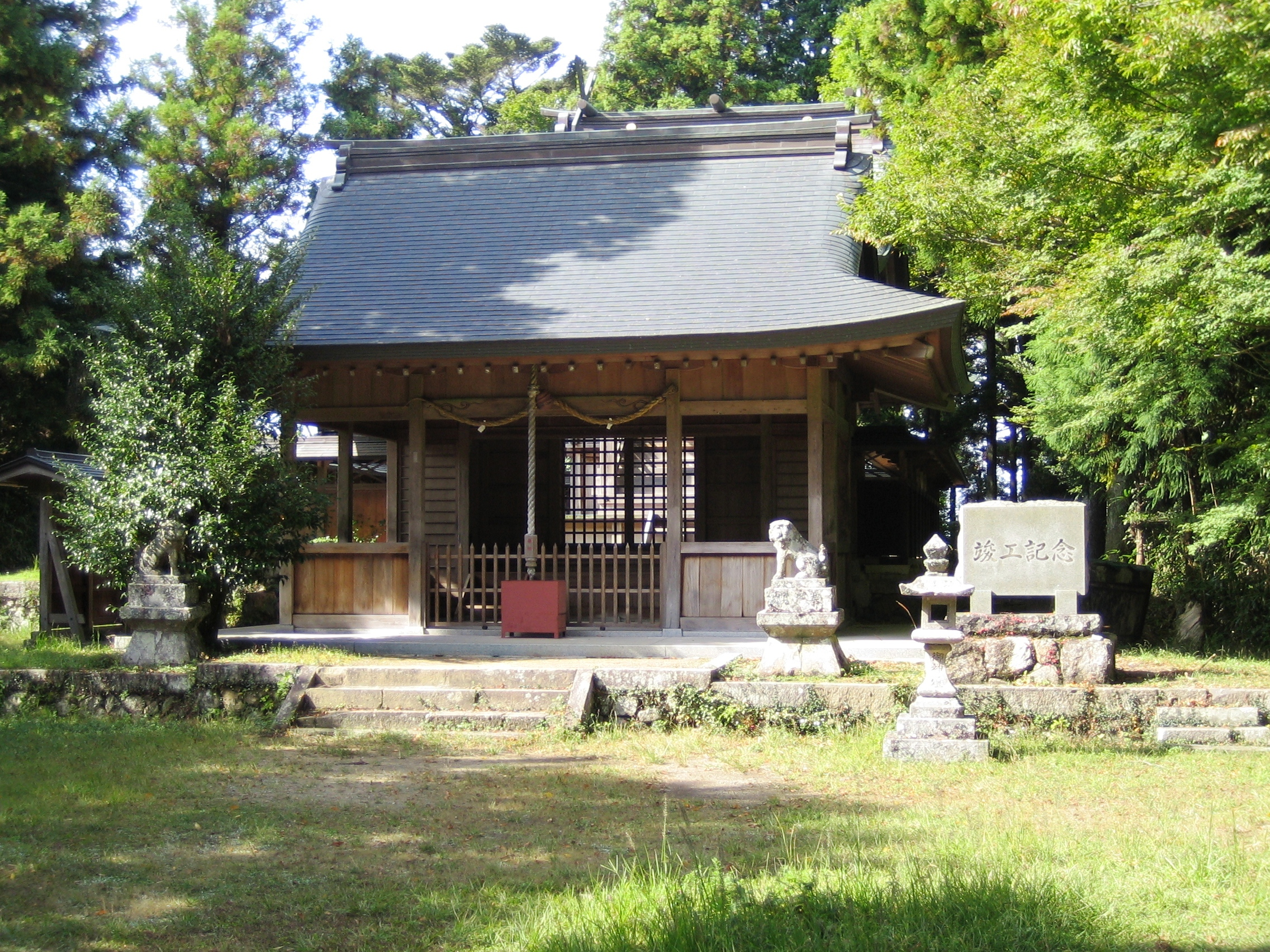
Tanjō Shrine (10/2008)

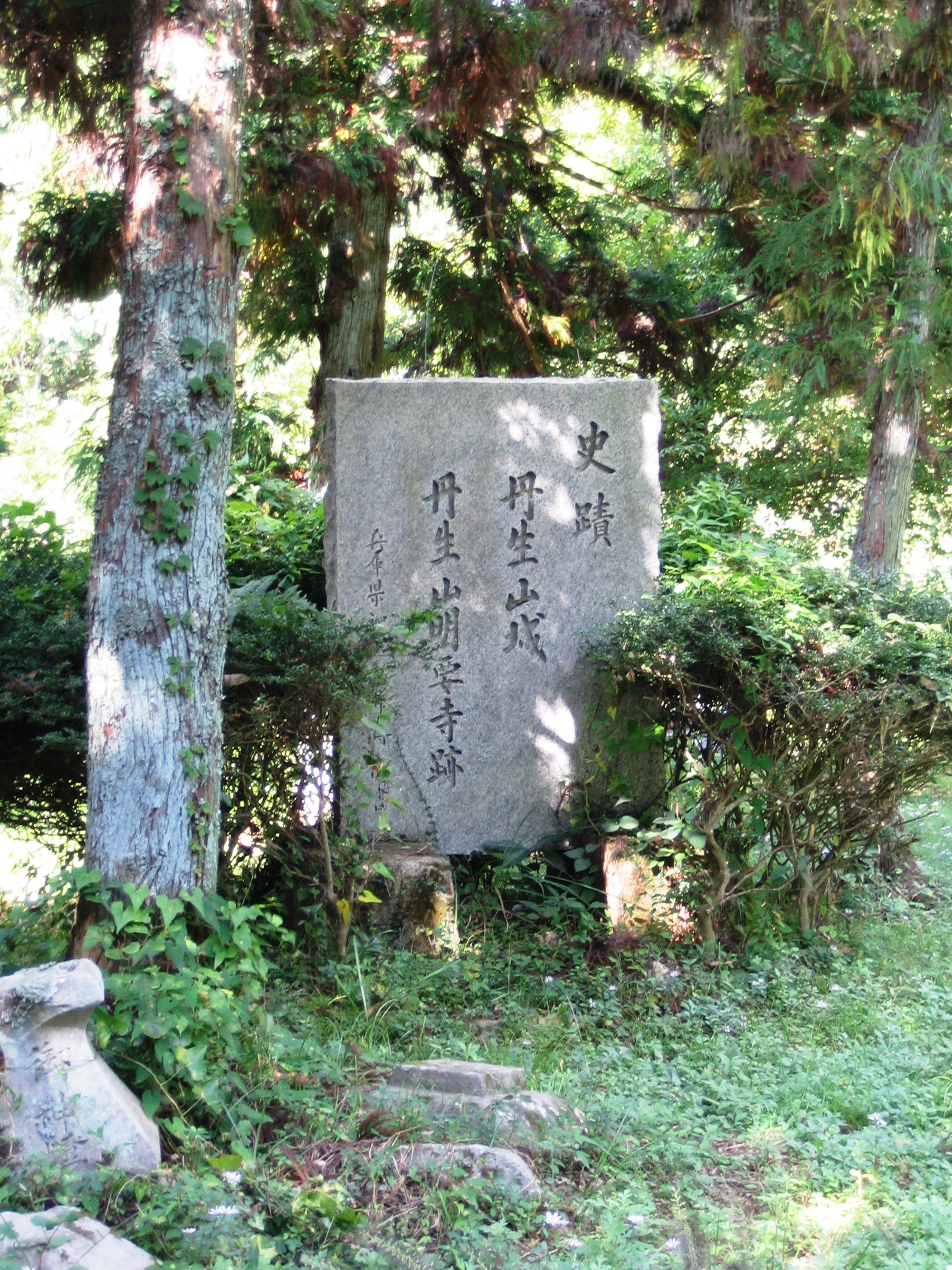
The monument of Tanjō Castle (10/2008)

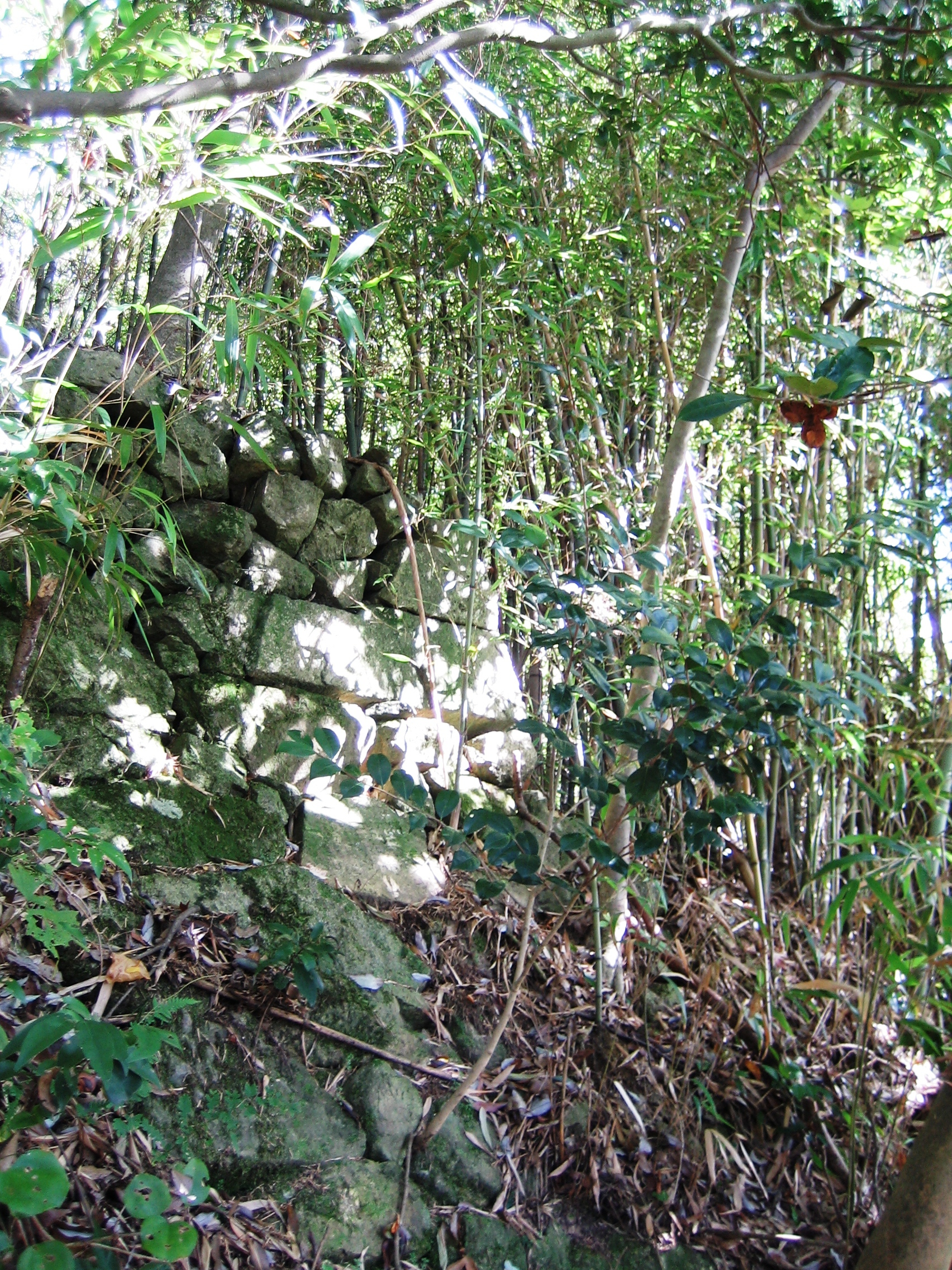
Ruins of Tanjō Castle (10/2008)

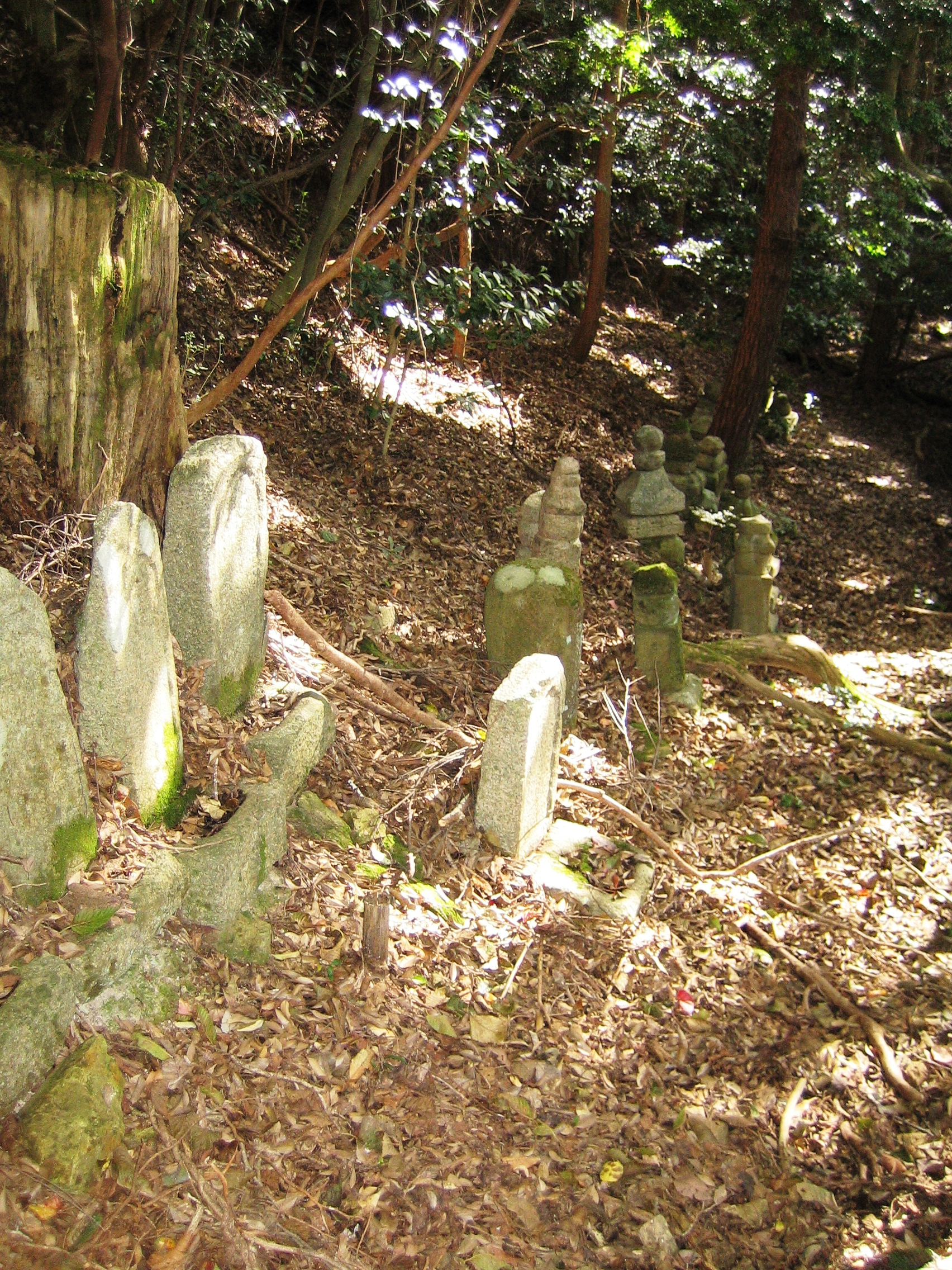
Grave stones at the ruin of Myōyōji Temple (1) (10/2008)

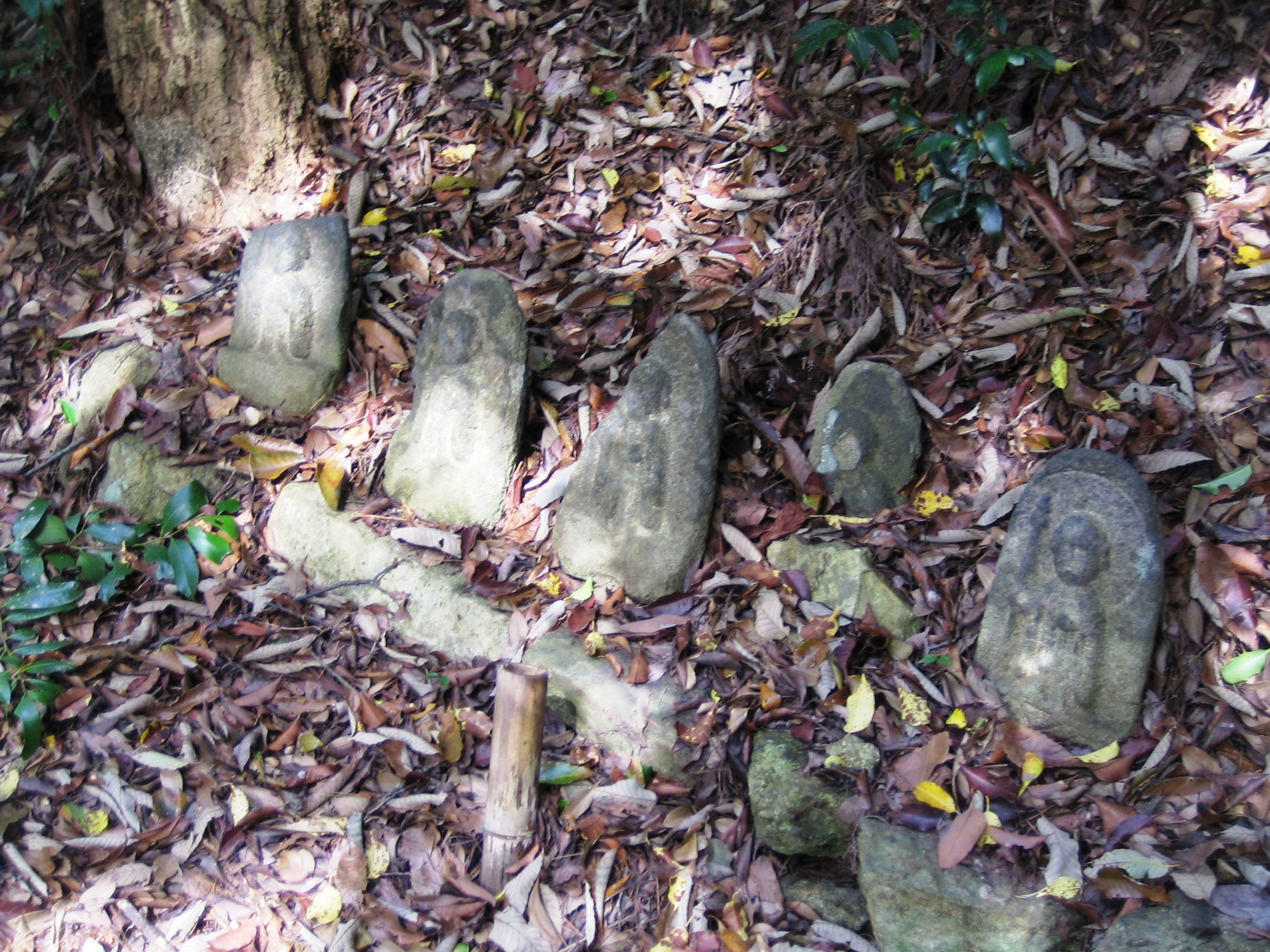
Grave stones at the ruin of Myōyōji Temple (2) (10/2008)

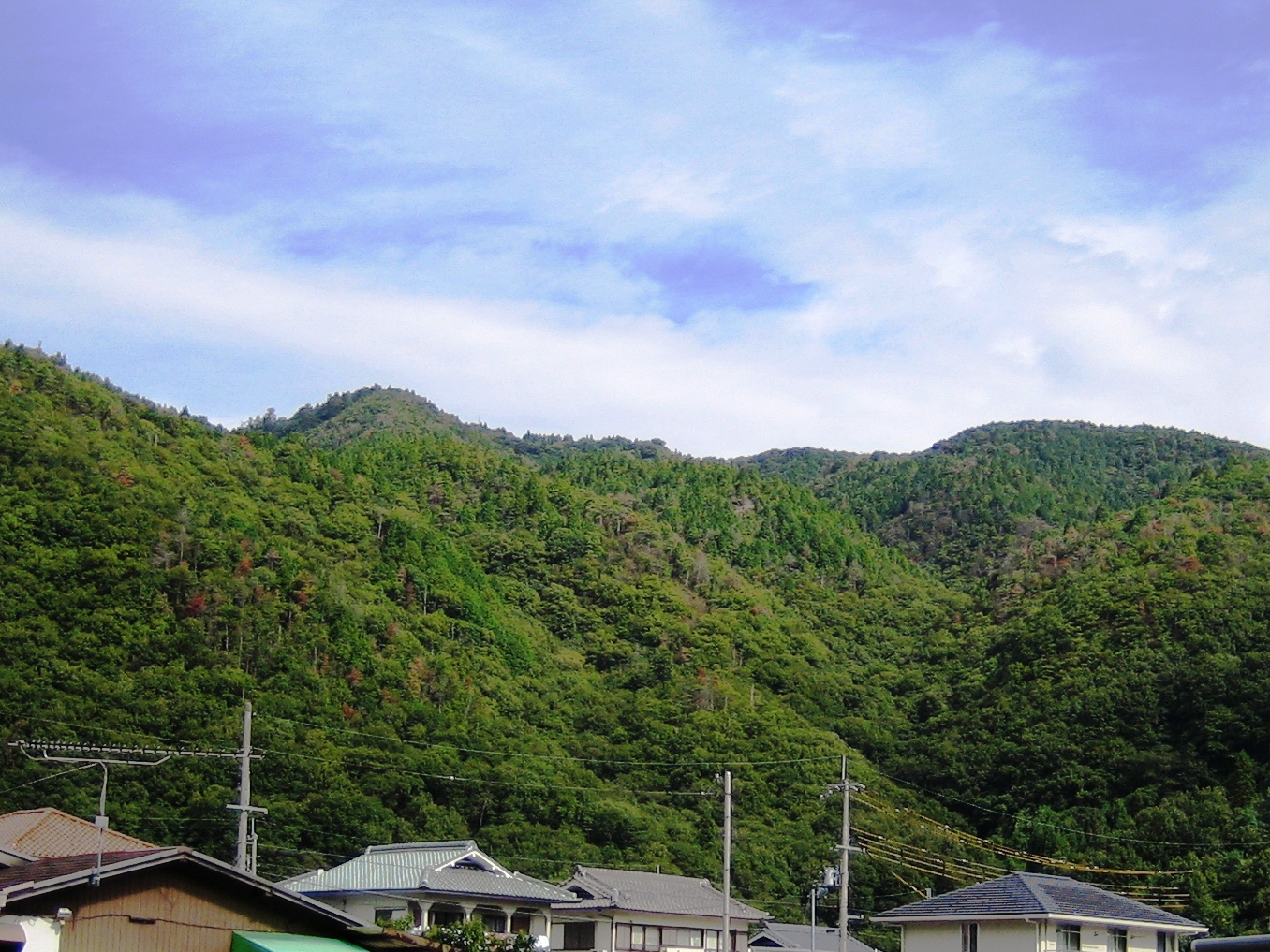
Mount Tanjō and Mount Taishaku from Tsukihara (10/2008)
