= Kitami Fuji =

- 北見富士
- Location within Japan

Highest point
- Elevation: 1,306.2 m (4,285 ft)
- Listing: List of mountains and hills of Japan by height
- Coordinates: 44°0′12″N 143°7′32″E

Geography
- Location: Hokkaido, Japan
- Parent range: Kitami Mountains
- Topo map(s): Geospatial Information Authority (国土地理院, Kokudochiriin) 25000:1 丸立峠; 25000:1 雄柏山; 25000:1 旧白滝; 25000:1 上雄柏; 50000:1 紋別; 50000:1 北見

Geology
- Mountain type: Fold

Kitami Fuji (北見富士) is located in the Kitami Mountains, Hokkaido, Japan. The peak marks the border of Takinoue, Monbetsu, and Engaru. It is the source of the Tatsuushi River.
