= Shokotsu River =

River in Hokkaidō, Japan

Shokutsu River 渚滑川
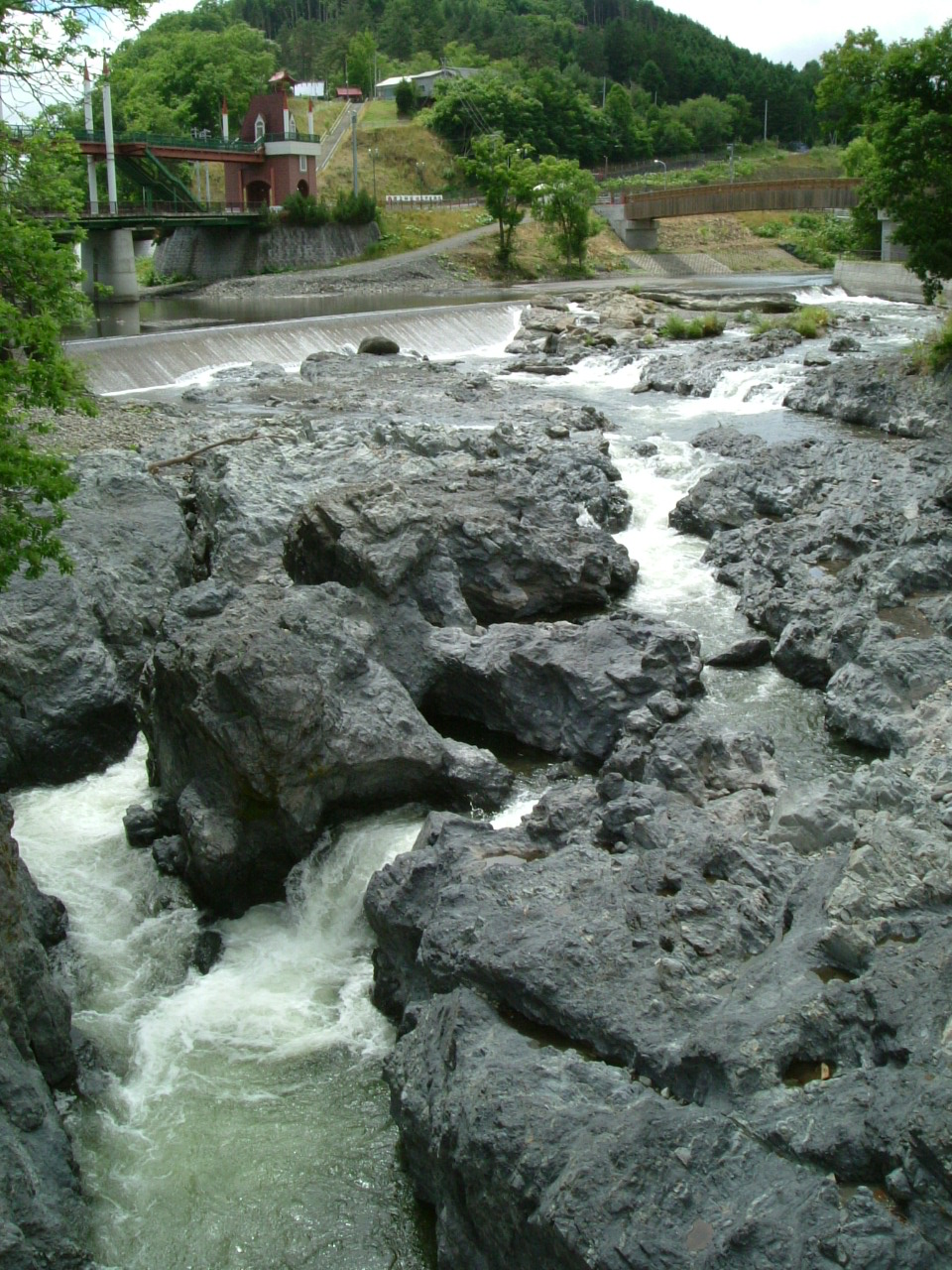

- Location within Japan
- Native name: Shokotsu-gawa (Japanese)

Location
- Country: Japan
- State: Hokkaido
- Region: Okhotsk
- District: Monbetsu
- Municipalities: Monbetsu, Takinoue

Physical characteristics
- Source: Mount Teshio
  - location: Takinoue, Hokkaido, Japan
  - coordinates: 43°57′52″N 142°53′17″E
  - elevation: 1,557.6 m (5,110 ft)
- Mouth: Sea of Okhotsk
  - location: Monbetsu, Hokkaido, Japan
  - coordinates: 44°22′48″N 143°19′22″E
  - elevation: 0 m (0 ft)
- Length: 84 km (52 mi)
- Basin size: 1,240 km^{2} (480 sq mi)
- Discharge
  - average: 33.22 m^{3}/s (1,173 cu ft/s)

The Shokotsu River (渚滑川, Shokotsu-gawa) is a river in Hokkaido, Japan. It is designated a Class A river by the Ministry of Land, Infrastructure, Transport and Tourism.

== Course ==
The river rises on the slopes of Mount Teshio in the Kitami Mountains. After flowing through Takinoue, the river is joined by the Sakurū and Tatsuushi Rivers. At Kamishokotsu in Monbetsu, the river leaves the mountains for the coastal plain. There it is joined by the Utsutsu River before flowing into the Sea of Okhotsk at Shokotsu in Monbetsu.

== Lists ==
=== List of (named) bridges and dams ===
From river mouth to source:

1. Shokotsu Bridge (渚滑橋, shokotsu-bashi) - Route 238 (Japan)
2. Yotsuha Great Bridge (よつ葉大橋, yotsuha-ōhashi)
3. Utsutsu Bridge (宇津々橋, utsutsu-bashi) - Hokkaidō Highway 766, Wakunbe-Shokotsu railway
4. Kine Bridge (記念橋, kinen-bashi) - Hokkaidō Highway 804, Wakunbe Kamishokotsu line
5. Shinki'nen Bridge (新記念橋, shinkinen-bashi) - Route 273 (Japan)
6. Daiyū Bridge (大雄橋, daiyū-bashi) - Hokkaidō Highway 932, Kamishokotsugenya-Kamishokotsu line
7. Chin Bridge (鎮橋, chin-bashi) - Route 273 (Japan)
8. Jūssen Bridge (十線橋, jūssen-bashi)
9. Midori Great Bridge (緑大橋, midori-ōhashi)
10. Takara Bridge (宝橋, takara-hashi)
11. Iwa Bridge (巌橋, iwa-bashi) - Route 273 (Japan)
12. Kiyose Bridge (きよせ橋, kiyose-bashi) - Route 273 (Japan)
13. Seiryū Bridge (清流橋, seiryū-bashi) - Route 273 (Japan)

=== List of (named) tributaries ===
From river mouth to source:

1. Left — Shokotsufuru River (渚滑古川)
2. Right — Shokotsuhachisenzawa River (渚滑八線沢川)
3. Right — Utsutsu River (ウツツ川)
4. Left — Nakashokotsuhōsei River (中渚滑豊盛川)
5. Left — Nakashokotsunijūgosen River (中渚滑二十五線川)
6. Right — Nakashokotsunijūichisen River (中渚滑二十一線川)
7. Right — Nakashokotsunijūsansen River (中渚滑二十三線川)
8. Right — Nakashokotsunijūyonsen River (中渚滑二十四線川)
9. Left — Kōki River (鴻輝川)
10. Left — Kiyose River (清瀬川)
11. Right — Wakunbe River (和訓辺川)
12. Left — Tatsuushinisenzawa River (立牛二線沢川)
13. Left — Tatsuushi River (立牛川)
14. Right — Abukaushinai River (アブカウシナイ川)
15. Left — Menashibetsu River (メナシベツ川)
16. Right — Gojūichi River (五十一川)
17. Left — Oshiraneppu River (オシラネップ川)
18. Right — Pankeochinnai River (パンケオチンナイ川)
19. Right — Gojūsan River (五十三川)
20. Left — Shūtorumappu River (シュウトルマップ川)
21. Right — Sakurū River (サクルー川)
22. Right — Takinouejūssen River (滝上十線川)
23. Right — Nikujūgosen River (二区十五線川)
24. Right — Mosekarushunai River (モセカルシュナイ川)
25. Right — Kumadesawa River (熊出沢川)
26. Left — Yonkusanjūssen River (四区三十線川)
27. Right — Battanosawa River (バッタノ沢川)
28. Right — Gokusanjūssen River (五区三十線川)
29. Right — Tsukimi River (月見川)
30. Right — Osatsunai River (オサツナイ川)
31. Right — Gakeno River (崖ノ沢)
32. Right — Shitasunagawakane River (下砂金川)
33. Right — Yonjūkyūssen River (四十九線川)
34. Left — Minamino River (南の川)
35. Left — Gojūrokusen River (五十六線沢)
36. Left — Gojūkyūsen River (五十九線沢)
37. Left — Takino River (滝ノ沢)
38. Left — Nino River (二ノ沢)
39. Left — Ichino River (一ノ沢)
