= Mount Shōkotsu =

Mountain in Hokkaido, Japan

Coordinates: 44°2′25″N 142°55′2″E

Mount Shokotsu
- 渚滑岳

Highest point
- Elevation: 1,345.4 m (4,414 ft)
- Prominence: 250 m (820 ft)
- Parent peak: Mount Teshio
- Listing: List of mountains and hills of Japan by height

Geography
- Location: Takinoue, Hokkaidō, Japan
- Parent range: Kitami Mountains
- Topo map(s): Geographical Survey Institute 25000:1 渚滑岳; 50000:1 名寄

Geology
- Volcanic arc: Kurile Arc

Mount Shokotsu (渚滑岳, Shokotsu-dake)

is a mountain in the Kitami Mountains. It is located in Takinoue, Hokkaidō, Japan.
