= Tatsuushi River =

River in Hokkaidō, Japan

Tatsuushi River 立牛川
- Location within Japan
- Native name: Tatsuushi-gawa (Japanese)

Location
- Country: Japan
- State: Hokkaido
- Region: Abashiri
- District: Monbetsu
- Municipality: Monbetsu

Physical characteristics
- Source: Kitami Fuji
  - location: Monbetsu, Hokkaido, Japan
  - coordinates: 44°1′0″N 143°8′41″E
  - elevation: 1,306 m (4,285 ft)
- Mouth: Shokotsu River
  - location: Monbetsu, Hokkaido, Japan
  - coordinates: 44°12′51″N 143°13′52″E
- Length: 33.3 km (20.7 mi)

Basin features
- River system: Shokotsu River

The Tatsuushi (立牛川, Tatsuushi-gawa) is a river in Hokkaido, Japan.

== Course ==
The river rises on the slopes of Kitami Fuji in the Kitami Mountains. It flows 33 km in a northerly direction until it flows into the Shokotsu River.
