= Mount Uenshiri =

Mountain in Hokkaidō, Japan

- ウエンシリ岳
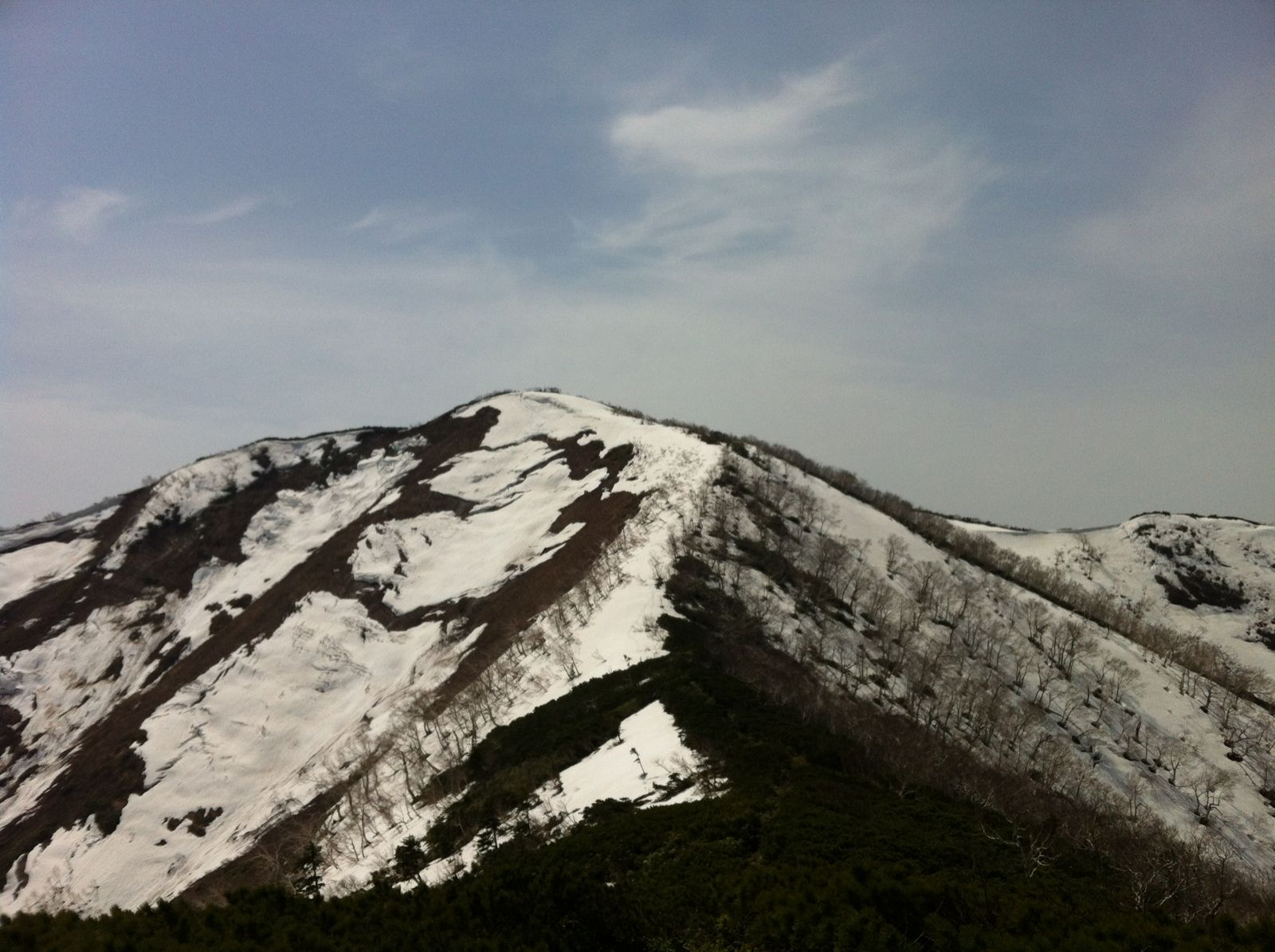

Highest point
- Elevation: 1,142.3 m (3,748 ft)
- Listing: List of mountains and hills of Japan by height
- Coordinates: 44°13′44″N 142°52′35″E

Geography
- Location: Hokkaidō, Japan
- Parent range: Kitami Mountains
- Topo map(s): Geographical Survey Institute 25000:1 上札久留; 25000:1 名寄川上流; 50000:1 名寄

Geology
- Volcanic arc: Kurile Arc

Mount Uenshiri (ウエンシリ岳, Uenshiri-dake) is a mountain in the Kitami Mountains. It is located on the border of Nishiokoppe, Shimokawa, and Takinoue, Hokkaidō, Japan.
