= Takinoue, Hokkaido =

Town in Japan

Takinoue 滝上町
- Town
- Flag Seal

- Location of Takinoue in Hokkaido (Okhotsk Subprefecture)

- Location in Japan
- Coordinates: 44°12′N 143°5′E
- Country: Japan
- Region: Hokkaido
- Prefecture: Hokkaido (Okhotsk Subprefecture)
- District: Monbetsu

Area
  - Total: 766.89 km^{2} (296.10 sq mi)

Population (September 30, 2016)
  - Total: 2,757
  - Density: 3.595/km^{2} (9.311/sq mi)
- Time zone: UTC+09:00 (JST)
- City hall address: 4-2-1 Asahi-machi, Takinoue-cho, Monbetsu-gun, Hokkaido; 099-5692
- Climate: Dfb
- Website: www.town.takinoue.hokkaido.jp
- Symbols
- Flower: Shibazakura
- Mascot: Pikoro (ピコロ)
- Tree: Sakura

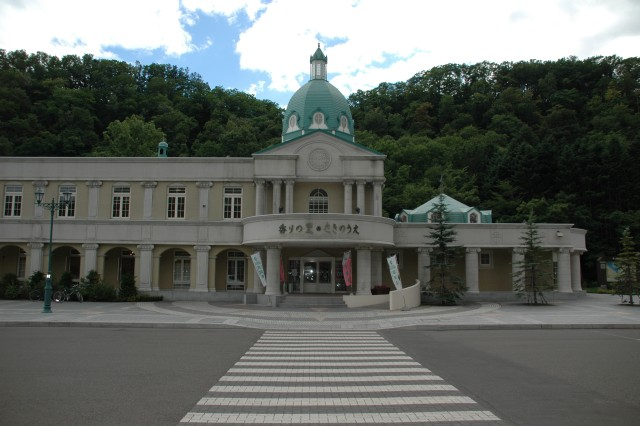
The Karinosato Michinoeki in Takinoue

Takinoue (滝上町, Takinoue-chō) is a town located in Okhotsk Subprefecture, Hokkaido, Japan. As of August 31, 2026, the town has an estimated population of 2,131 and a population density of 3.6 persons per km^{²}. The total area is 766.89 km^{²}.

== Etymology ==
In the Ainu language, the Takinoue area is called Ponkamuikotan which roughly translates to "Village of the Small Gods." The name Takinoue, which literally means "Above the Waterfall," originates from the first Japanese settlers who founded the city upstream from a waterfall.

== Economy ==
Takinoue's key industries are forestry, dairy farming, and dry-crop farming.

Takinoue is famous for its mint production and produces 95% of the mint available in Japan. Currently there is about 10 hectares (25 acres) of land dedicated to mint farming.

=== Agriculture ===
- Okhotsk Hamanasu Agricultural Cooperative, Takinoue Branch

=== Banking institutions ===
- Kitami Credit Union, Takinoue Branch

=== Postal services ===
- Takinoue Post Office (Japan Postal Service Center distribution point)
- Nigorikawa Post Office
- Takinishi Post Office

=== Police ===
- Takinoue Police Department (a sub-station of Monbetsu Police Department)

== Geography ==
Takinoue is surrounded on three sides by mountains. It shares the fourth side with Monbetsu City.

- Mountains: Mt. Wenshiri (1,142m / 0.71 mi); Mt. Kitami-Fuji (1,306m / 0.81 mi); Mt. Teshio (1,558m / 0.97 mi)
- Major Rivers: Shokotsu River; Sakuru River; Oshiraneppu River

=== Climate ===
Climate data for Takinoue (1991−2020 normals, extremes 1977−present)
Month	Jan	Feb	Mar	Apr	May	Jun	Jul	Aug	Sep	Oct	Nov	Dec	Year
Record high °C (°F)	7.7 (45.9)	14.2 (57.6)	16.8 (62.2)	28.5 (83.3)	34.0 (93.2)	34.8 (94.6)	36.5 (97.7)	37.7 (99.9)	32.1 (89.8)	27.2 (81.0)	22.1 (71.8)	14.6 (58.3)	37.7 (99.9)
Mean daily maximum °C (°F)	−3.2 (26.2)	−2.3 (27.9)	2.3 (36.1)	10.0 (50.0)	17.3 (63.1)	21.1 (70.0)	24.5 (76.1)	25.0 (77.0)	21.2 (70.2)	14.4 (57.9)	6.0 (42.8)	−1.0 (30.2)	11.3 (52.3)
Daily mean °C (°F)	−8.3 (17.1)	−7.7 (18.1)	−2.9 (26.8)	4.0 (39.2)	10.3 (50.5)	14.4 (57.9)	18.3 (64.9)	19.1 (66.4)	14.8 (58.6)	8.2 (46.8)	1.7 (35.1)	−5.1 (22.8)	5.6 (42.0)
Mean daily minimum °C (°F)	−15.0 (5.0)	−15.2 (4.6)	−9.4 (15.1)	−2.2 (28.0)	3.4 (38.1)	8.4 (47.1)	13.3 (55.9)	14.4 (57.9)	9.2 (48.6)	2.4 (36.3)	−2.8 (27.0)	−10.4 (13.3)	−0.3 (31.4)
Record low °C (°F)	−32.2 (−26.0)	−35.2 (−31.4)	−31.4 (−24.5)	−16.7 (1.9)	−6.5 (20.3)	−2.3 (27.9)	2.3 (36.1)	2.9 (37.2)	−1.2 (29.8)	−7.6 (18.3)	−20.1 (−4.2)	−28.7 (−19.7)	−35.2 (−31.4)
Average precipitation mm (inches)	55.4 (2.18)	38.2 (1.50)	42.2 (1.66)	42.4 (1.67)	55.2 (2.17)	67.8 (2.67)	114.7 (4.52)	136.0 (5.35)	135.3 (5.33)	95.6 (3.76)	79.0 (3.11)	66.8 (2.63)	926.7 (36.48)
Average snowfall cm (inches)	153 (60)	128 (50)	117 (46)	30 (12)	2 (0.8)	0 (0)	0 (0)	0 (0)	0 (0)	2 (0.8)	53 (21)	148 (58)	630 (248)
Average precipitation days (≥ 1.0 mm)	13.3	12.2	12.3	10.3	9.6	10.3	10.6	11.6	12.6	13.3	15.7	15.7	147.5
Average snowy days (≥ 3 cm)	16.5	16.0	14.1	4.1	0.2	0	0	0	0	0.2	5.7	16.0	72.8
Mean monthly sunshine hours	68.8	78.7	123.1	156.5	171.6	149.2	141.5	135.0	142.4	132.3	72.2	52.3	1,423.4
Source: JMA

== History ==
- 1907 - Takinoue first appears as a place name on regional maps.
- 1918 - Takinoue Village splits from Shokotsu Village and becomes a second-class municipality under the Monbetsu District.
- 1947 - Takinoue Village becomes Takinoue Town.
- The National Land Agency awards Takinoue 2nd place in the nation for quality of farmed products.

== Sister cities ==
Takinoue is twinned with Ochi Town in Kōchi Prefecture.

== Education ==
=== High schools ===
- Hokkaido Takinoue High School - closed 2019

=== Junior high schools ===
- Takinoue Junior High School

=== Elementary schools ===
- Nigorikawa Elementary School
- Shiratori Elementary School- closed 2013
- Takinishi Elementary School- closed 2014
- Takinoue Elementary School

== Transportation ==
=== Airports ===
- Asahikawa Airport
- Monbetsu Airport

=== Rail ===
Takinoue has no rail services.

=== Bus ===
- Hokkaido Chuo Bus, JR Hokkaido Bus, and Dohoku Bus lines run from Takinoue to Asahikawa and Sapporo
- Hokumon Bus - Local routes run from Takinoue to Monbetsu

=== Roads ===
==== National Highways ====
- National Route 273

==== Prefectural Highways ====
- Hokkaidō Route 61 (Shibetsu - Takinoue)
- Hokkaidō Route 137 (Engaru - Takinoue)
- Hokkaidō Route 617 (Oshiraneppu - Nigorikawa)
- Hokkaidō Route 828 (Shiratori - Takinoue)
- Hokkaidō Route 932 (Kamishokotsu - Takinoue)
- Hokkaidō Route 996 (Kamishokotsu - Takinoue)

== Sightseeing ==
- Karinosato Herb Garden
- Kinsenkyo Gorge Walking Path
- Takinoue Park (Shibazakura)
- Ukushima Wetlands
- Yoshokuen Botanical Garden

== Attractions ==
Takinoue Park is famous for Shibazakura or Pink Moss. The 10,000 m^{²} park attracts thousands of visitors every year between May and June when the flowers are in full bloom.

== Festivals ==
- Shibazakura Festival (May - June)
- Summer Festival of Love (mid August)

== Mascot ==
Pikoro, the town's mascot

Takinoue's mascot is Pikoro (ピコロ). She is a sakura fairy. Using her sakura wand, she can grant anyone wishes. She is also known to make music. She is unveiled in 1991.
