= Mount Chitokaniushi =

Mountain in Hokkaido, Japan

- チトカニウシ山

Highest point
- Elevation: 1,445.6 m (4,743 ft)
- Listing: List of mountains and hills of Japan by height
- Coordinates: 43°54′25″N 143°2′55″E

Geography
- Location: Hokkaidō, Japan
- Parent range: Kitami Mountains
- Topo map(s): Geographical Survey Institute 25000:1 北見峠; 50000:1 北見

Geology
- Volcanic arc: Kurile Arc

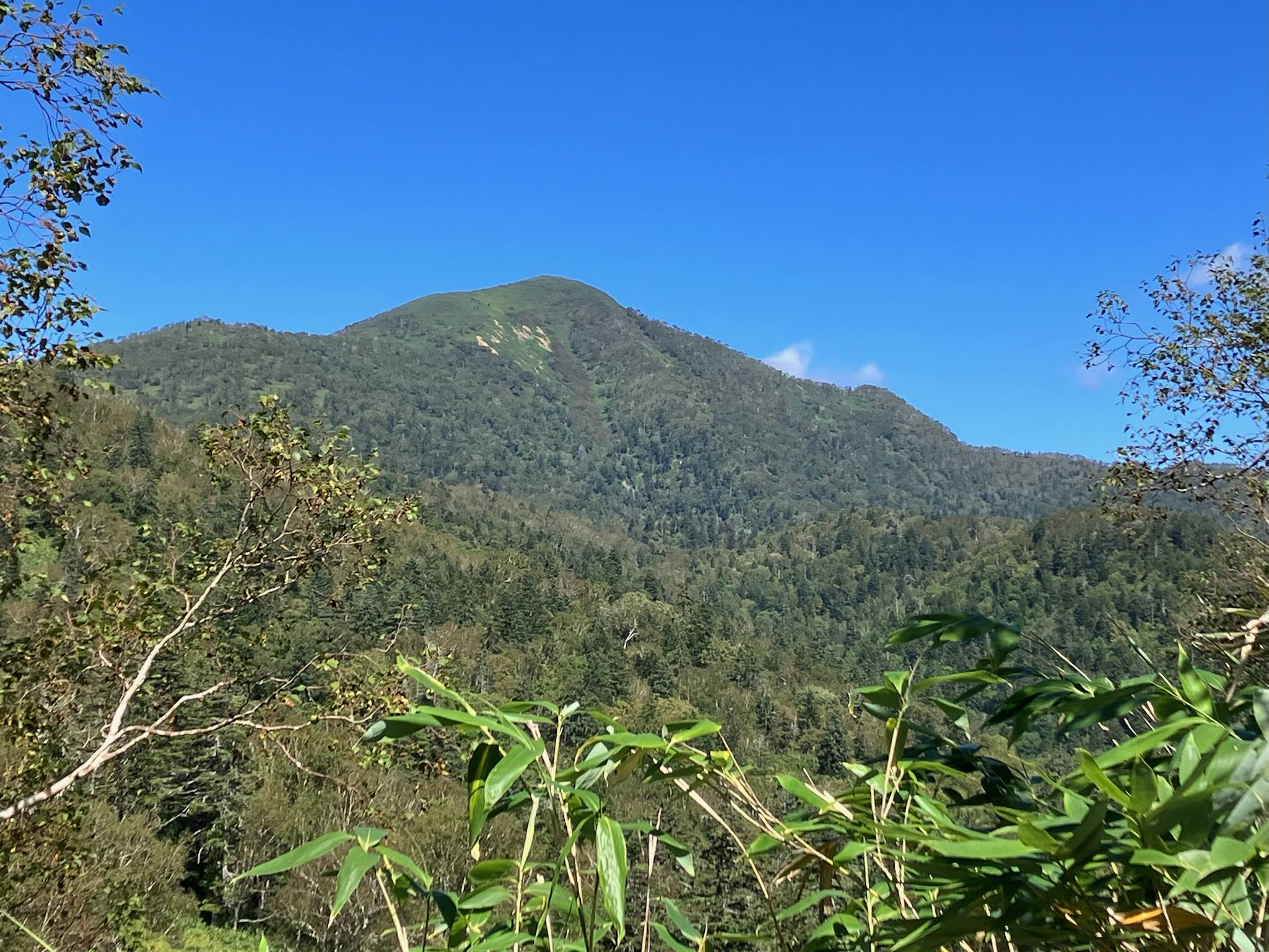
Mount Chitokaniushi

Mount Chitokaniushi (チトカニウシ山, Chitokaniushi-san) is the second tallest mountain in the Kitami Mountains. It is located on the border of Kamikawa and Engaru, Hokkaidō, Japan.

== Bibliography ==
- Geographical Survey Institute
