= Mount Piyashiri =

- ピヤシリ山
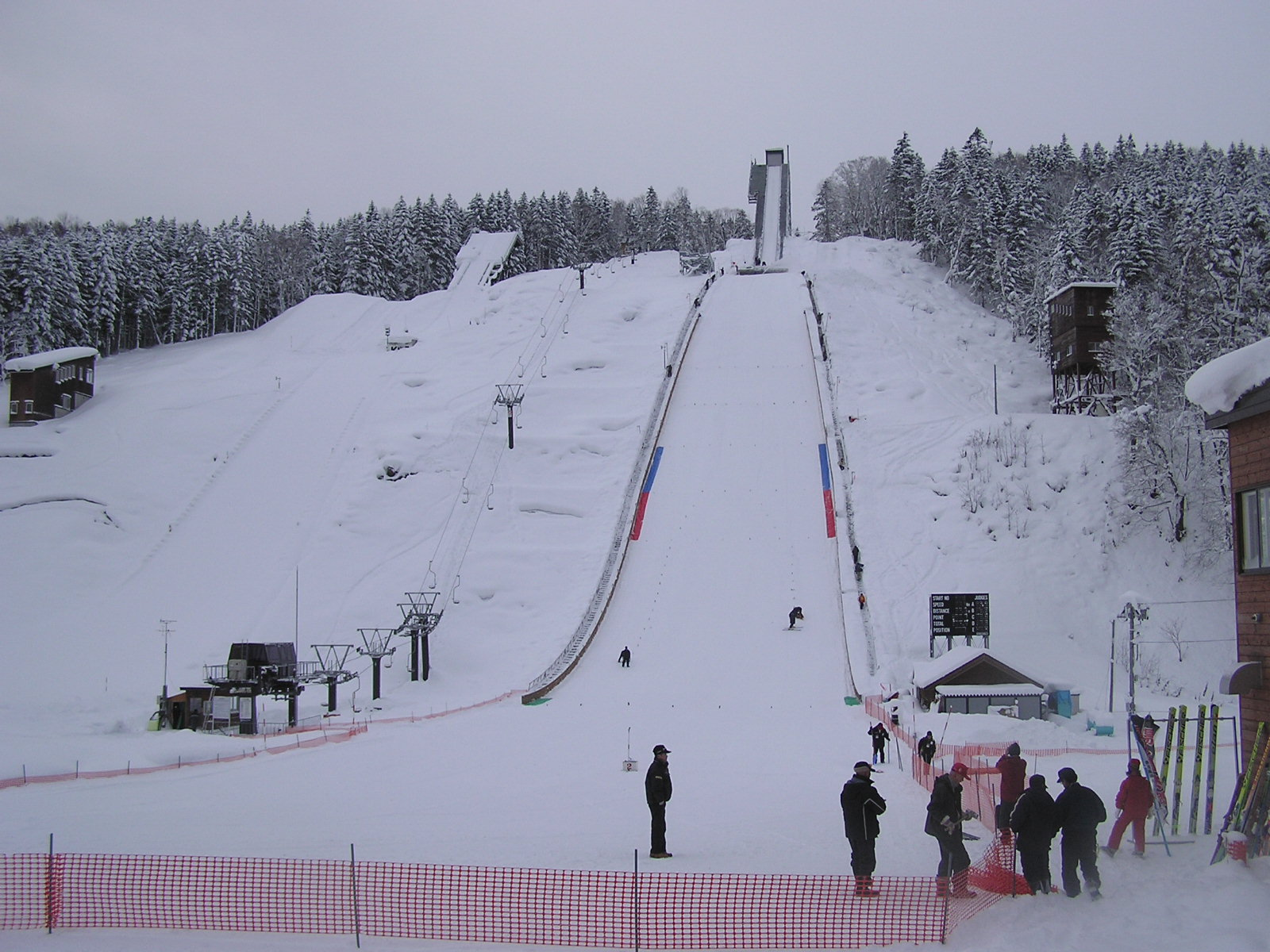
- Ski jump on Mount Piyashiri (December 2007)

Highest point
- Elevation: 987 m (3,238 ft)
- Listing: List of mountains and hills of Japan by height
- Coordinates: 44°26′1″N 142°35′3″E

Geography
- Location: Hokkaidō, Japan
- Parent range: Kitami Mountains
- Topo map(s): Geographical Survey Institute 25000:1 ピヤシリ山; 50000:1 名寄

Geology
- Volcanic arc: Kurile Arc

Mount Piyashiri (ピヤシリ山, Piyashiri-san) is a mountain in the Kitami Mountains. It is located on the border of Nayoro, Ōmu and Shimokawa, Hokkaidō, Japan.
