= Mount Hako =

Mountain in Hokkaido, Japan

- 函岳
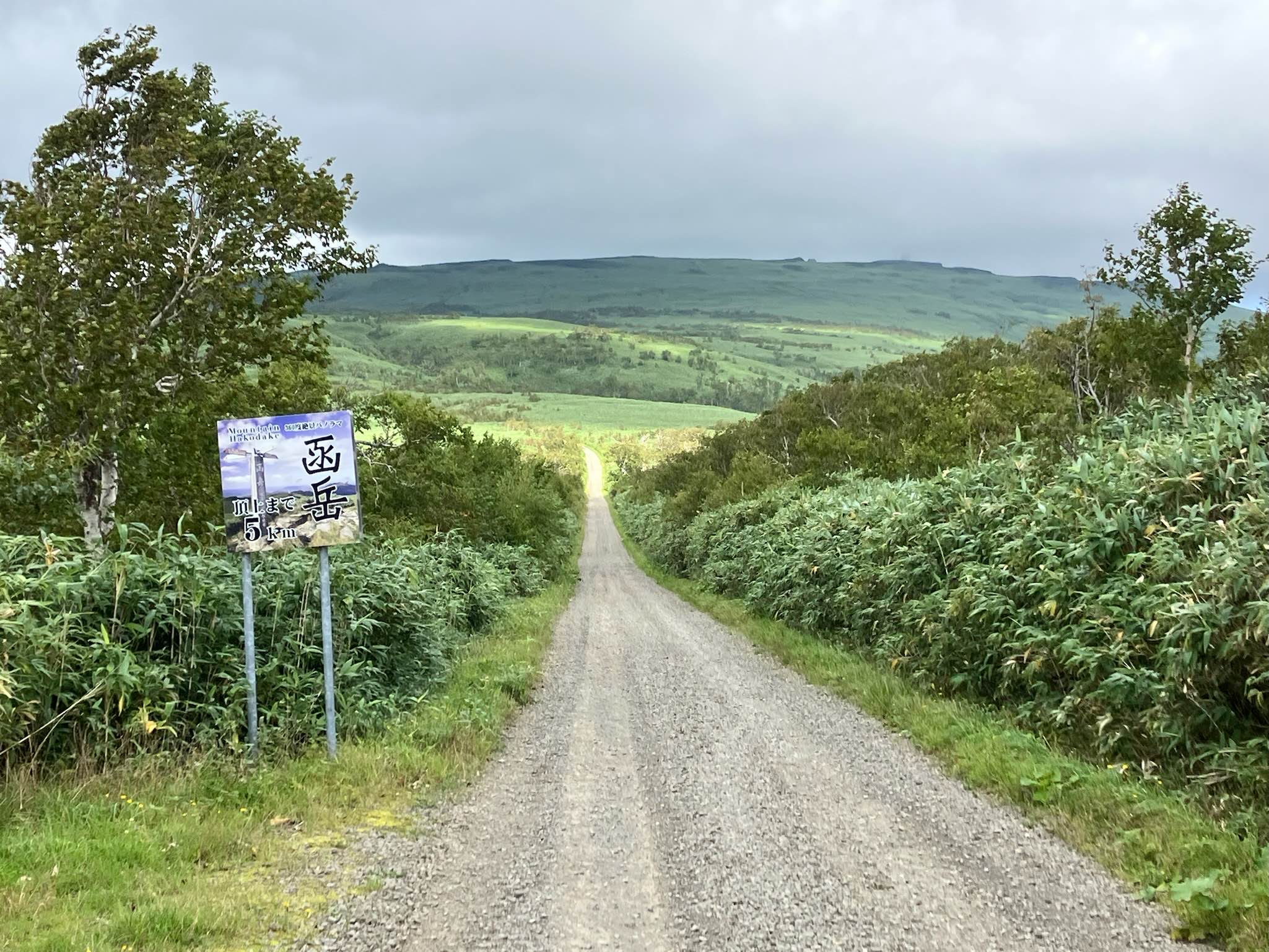
- Mount Hako from Dohoku Super Rindo

Highest point
- Elevation: 1,129.4 m (3,705 ft)
- Listing: List of mountains and hills of Japan by height
- Coordinates: 44°39′57″N 142°24′44″E

Geography
- Location: Hokkaido, Japan
- Parent range: Kitami Mountains
- Topo map(s): Geographical Survey Institute 25000:1 函岳; 25000:1 屋根棟山; 50000:1 名寄; 50000:1 枝幸

Geology
- Rock age: Middle Miocene–Late Miocene
- Mountain type: volcanic
- Volcanic arc: Kurile Arc

Mount Hako (函岳, Hako-dake) is a mountain in the Kitami Mountains. It is located on the border of Bifuka, Otoineppu and Esashi in Hokkaido, Japan.

Mount Hako is made from mafic non-alkali rock from 15 to 7 million years old.
