= Okhotsk Tokkari Center =

Seal rehabilitation center in Japan

Coordinates: 44.3339°N 143.3732°E

Okhotsk Tokkari Center – Seal Land
- オホーツクとっかりセンター（アザラシランド）
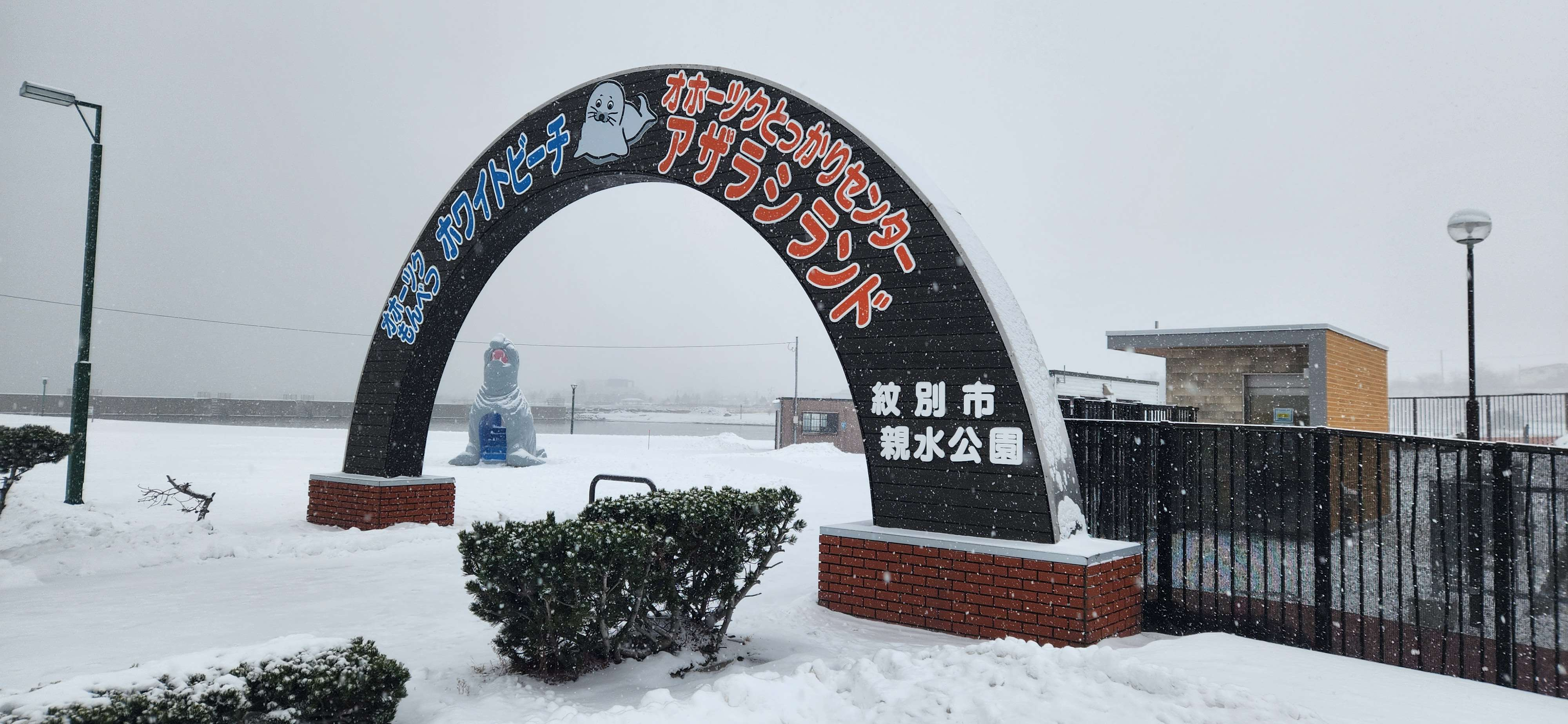
- The entrance to Okhotsk Tokkari Center in winter
- Interactive map of Okhotsk Tokkari Center – Seal Land
- Location: 2 Kaiyokoen, Mombetsu, Hokkaido 094-0031, Japan
- No. of animals: 27
- No. of species: 3
- Website: https://o-tower.co.jp/tokkaricenter.html

Okhotsk Tokkari Center – Seal Land (Japanese: オホーツクとっかりセンター（アザラシランド）) is a seal rescue center and sanctuary located in Monbetsu, Hokkaido, Japan. It is currently the only dedicated marine mammal rescue and rehabilitation facility in Japan, with a focus on caring for seals native to the Sea of Okhotsk.

== Overview ==
The name "Tokkari" is derived from the Ainu word for seal, tukar. As of 2022, Okhotsk Tokkari Center is managed and operated by Garinko Tower Co., Ltd. (オホーツク・ガリンコタワー株式会社). The park is funded through a combination of ticket sales, crowdfunding, merchandise sales, and hometown tax credits.

== History ==
Okhotsk Tokkari Center was established in 1987, when four seals were taken in for protection. The facility has since grown to house more than 20 seals.

== Facilities ==
The center comprises two main visitor areas: Azarashi Land (アザラシランド) and Azarashi Sea Paradise (アザラシシーパラダイス). It is located within Monbetsu Marine Park (海洋公園), at the address 2 Kaiyokoen, Monbetsu.

=== Animal care ===
Each morning, staff review the previous day's records before beginning cleaning of the indoor and outdoor pools. Each seal's droppings are checked during cleaning as part of routine health monitoring. Seals are weighed twice a month, with food and medication amounts calculated based on body weight.

All resident seals are fed and trained individually at least three times a day. Food intake is logged in increments of 10 grams per individual. The primary food is Atka mackerel (ホッケ), supplemented with other fresh seasonal fish.

=== Feeding times ===
Feeding is typically held five times daily. During the spring breeding season (March–April), sessions are reduced to three times daily.

== Animals ==
The facility cares exclusively for seals. The majority are spotted seals (Phoca largha) and ringed seals (Pusa hispida). In addition to its resident population, Tokkari Center rescues and rehabilitates wild seals; once treatment is complete, they are released off the coast of Monbetsu.

=== Resident seals ===
All information sourced from the official seal profiles.

Name	Japanese	Species	Sex	Age	Notes				
Biku	ビク	Spotted seal	Female	37	Rescued at approximately three weeks old inside Monbetsu Harbor. Her name derives from the Japanese onomatopoeia bikubiku (ビクビク), meaning "timid" or "flinchy."				
Kite	キテ	Spotted seal	Female	37	Rescued at approximately two weeks old inside Monbetsu Harbor. When rescued, her flippers were painted yellow to distinguish her, giving rise to her name (黄手, kite, meaning "yellow hand").				
Agu	アグ	Spotted seal	Male	37	Rescued by a fisherman in Saruru, a town neighboring Monbetsu.				
Hanajiro	ハナジロ	Spotted seal	Female	37	Mother of Shinobu and Kazuki.				
Komuke	コムケ	Spotted seal	Female	36	Rescued from Lake Komuke, south of Monbetsu.				
Daikichimaru	大吉丸	Spotted seal	Male	35	Named after the fishing vessel Daikichimaru whose crew rescued him.				
Takuma	タクマ	Spotted seal	Male	35	Rescued off the coast of Monbetsu. Named after the fisherman who rescued him.				
Hanako	ハナコ	Spotted seal	Female	34	Named after the wife of the person who rescued her.				
Naomi	ナオミ	Spotted seal	Female	33	Named after the granddaughter of the fisherman who rescued her.				
Hiro	ヒロ	Spotted seal	Female	34					
Kenji	ケンジ	Spotted seal	Male	32					
Magao	マガオ	Spotted seal	Male	31	Named for his perpetually serious expression (真顔, magao, meaning "straight face")				
Kazuki	カズキ	Spotted seal	Male	30	Born 29 March 1995. Son of Hanajiro and Gugu.				
Meme	めめ	Spotted seal	Female	15	Rescued from a beach in Oumu after being attacked by birds. She does not have her right eye.				
Kai	海	Spotted seal	Male	13	Son of Kazuki and Komuke.				
Yo	よう	Ringed seal	Female	14	She was rescued in Rausu-cho.				
Katsunori	かつのり	Ringed seal	Male	14	Rescued by a fisherman from rocks inside Monbetsu Harbor, who also gave him his name. During breeding season, he emits a gasoline-like scent, characteristic of male ringed seals during this time.				
Kyoro	キョロ	Spotted seal	Female	12	Resident of Azarashi Sea Paradise. Rescued from Lake Notoro in Abashiri. Her name derives from kyorokyoro (キョロキョロ), meaning to look around restlessly, reflecting her large, darting eyes.				
Hiyori	日和	Spotted seal	Female	11	Resident of Azarashi Sea Paradise. Rescued inside Monbetsu Harbor on a clear, fine day; her name means "fine weather."				
Harumi	はるみ	Spotted seal	Female	10	Rescued from a beach in Monbetsu.				
Risa	りさ	Spotted seal	Female	10	Rescued from a breakwater in front of the Okhotsk Tower.				
Gariko	がり子	Spotted seal	Female	9	Rescued in Esashi-cho in very thin condition, but now fully rounded out. She was named after the icebreaking vessel Garinko-go II.				
Mina	みな	Spotted seal	Female	7	Rescued from a beach in Oumu with injuries to both eyes. She is blind and understands the staff via vocal cues.				
Yuuta	ゆうた	Spotted seal	Male	6	Rescued in Oumu. He acts as a "big-brother" figure to Neruo, as they were rescued in the same year.				
Neruo	ねるお	Spotted seal	Male	6	Rescued from Omusaro beach.				
Sol	ソル	Spotted seal	Male	2	Rescued from Lake Saroma.				
Mashiro	ましろ	Ringed seal	Male	1	Rescued in Oumu-cho, found on snow-covered ground.	pukumaru	ぷくまる	2	the only ribbon seal in there
Tsuki	月	Ringed seal	Female	1	Born 21 March 2025. Daughter of Katsunori and Yo.				

== Sources ==
- Garinko Tower Co., Ltd. "アザラシ紹介". o-tower.co.jp (in Japanese).
- Makuake (2019). "【寄附控除あり】日本で唯一のアザラシ保護施設「とっかりセンター」を応援しよう!". makuake.com (in Japanese).
- Yomiuri Shimbun (2022). "ふるさと納税、北海道が突出…巣ごもりで「お取り寄せ」感が人気". yomiuri.co.jp (in Japanese).
- "Okhotsk Tokkari Center (Seal Land)". visit-hokkaido.jp. Hokkaido Tourism Organization.
