= Monbetsu Airport =

Airport in Monbetsu, Hokkaido, Japan

Okhotsk Monbetsu Airport
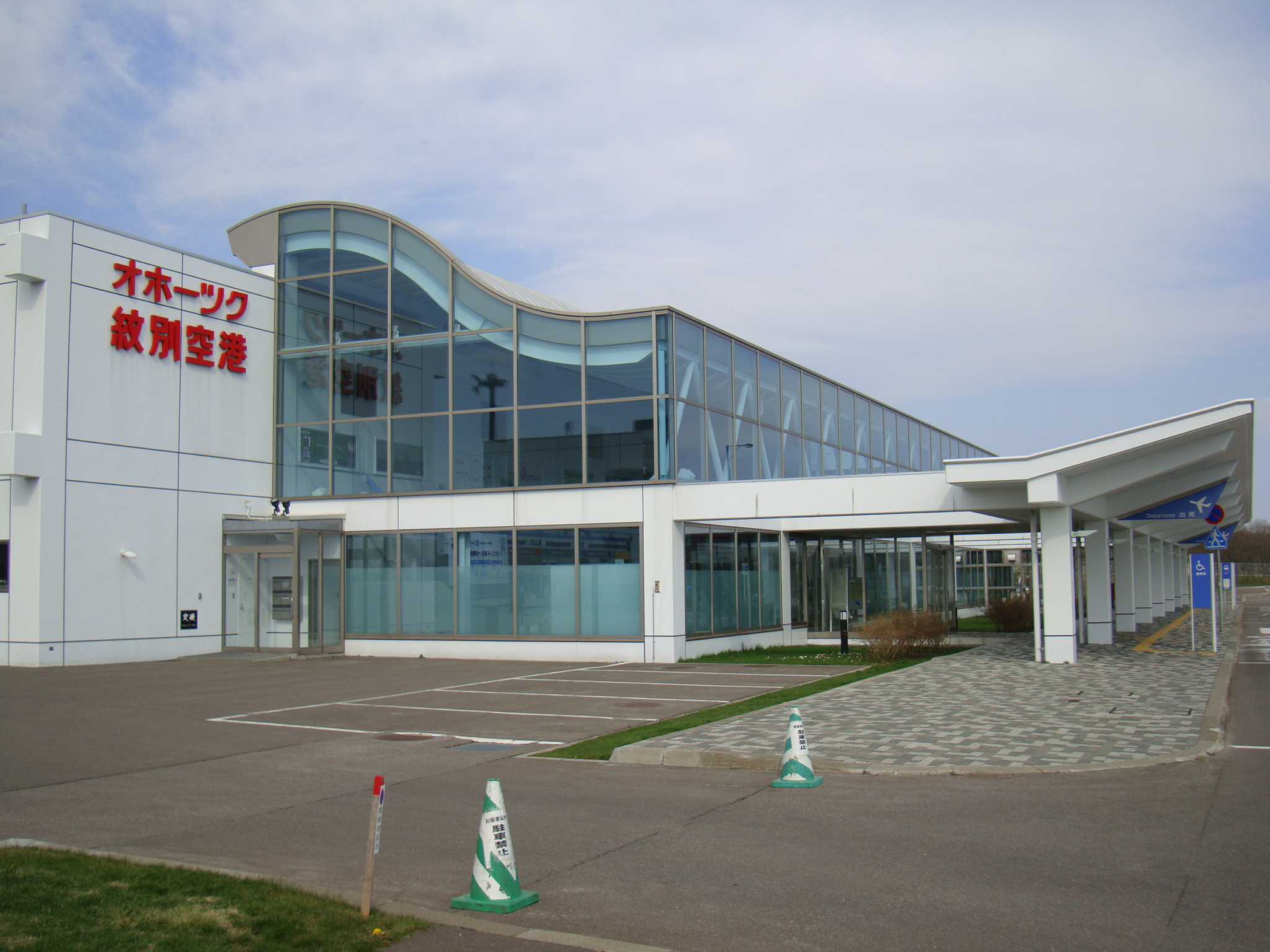
- IATA: MBE; ICAO: RJEB

Summary
- Airport type: Public
- Operator: Hokkaido Government
- Location: 8 km southeast of Monbetsu, Hokkaido
- Elevation AMSL: 58 ft (18 m)
- Coordinates: 44°18′15″N 143°24′15″E

Map
- Location in Hokkaidō Location in Japan

Runways
Direction	Length		Surface
Direction	m	ft	Surface
14/32	2,000	6,562	Asphalt concrete

Statistics (2015)
- Passengers: 71,802
- Cargo (metric tonnes): 0
- Aircraft movement: 783
- Source: Japanese Ministry of Land, Infrastructure, Transport and Tourism

Monbetsu Airport (紋別空港, Monbetsu Kūkō) or Okhotsk Monbetsu Airport (オホーツク紋別空港, Ohōtsuku Monbetsu Kūkō) (IATA: MBE, ICAO: RJEB), is a third class airport located 3.8 NM (7.0 km; 4.4 mi) southeast of Monbetsu, a city on the Sea of Okhotsk in Hokkaido, Japan. The airport is 15 minutes from the city center and accessible by bus from the Monbetsu Bus Terminal.

== History ==
MBE is the newest airport in Hokkaidō: it opened in November 1999. The airport was originally used for general aviation flights. It replaced the former Monbetsu Airport, which was located further from the city. Air Nippon inaugurated daily service to New Chitose Airport outside Sapporo that year, and added flights to Tokyo International Airport in 2000. The Sapporo service was moved to Okadama Airport in 2001 and discontinued entirely in 2003. For a short period between July and November 2011, Hokkaido Air System offered one daily service to Okadama Airport.

In fiscal year 2008, Monbetsu Airport recorded an operating loss of 273 million yen on total revenues (chiefly landing fees received from ANA) of only 26 million yen, making its operating losses the highest among the six airports operated by the Hokkaido government. In 2011, the Hokkaido government announced that landing fees would be waived for international charter flights using the airport in an attempt to lure more overseas tourists to the region.

In the winter of 2013, ANA again started services to Sapporo, flying a daily 737-700 flight to New Chitose Airport. By 2015, the flights from MBE to New Chitose Airport had ceased.

== Airlines and destinations ==
The airport has a two-story, 1,993 m^{2} terminal building which is open daily from 8:30 a.m. to 5:00 p.m.

Airlines	Destinations
All Nippon Airways	Tokyo–Haneda

=== Flights ===
MBE has one daily inbound flight, and one daily outbound flight serviced by ANA.

Daily Flights
Flight Number	Origin	Destination
ANA 375	Tokyo-Haneda	Monbetsu
ANA 376	Monbetsu	Tokyo-Haneda

== Amenities ==
=== Parking ===
The parking lot can hold 226 personal vehicles and 6 buses. In winter, due to the snow clearing, the parking availability is reduced to 99 personal vehicles and 3 buses. The parking lot is open from 7:30 a.m. to 6:00 p.m.

=== Rental Car ===
The airport is home to a Toyota Rent a Car location.

=== Taxi ===
The airport has a taxi stand with two taxi companies.

=== Buses ===
The airport has two free shuttle buses for both arriving and departing passengers. The first, on the Monbetsu Line, has numerous stops at places such as the bus terminal and hotels. The second, on the Engaru Line, terminates at the Engaru bus terminal with stops in Yūbetsu, Naka-Yūbetsu, and Kami-Yūbetsu.

=== Restaurant ===
The airport is home to a small Japanese style coffee shop.

Gift Shop

There is a small gift shop features omiyage, snacks and other goods from Monbetsu, Okhotsk Subprefecture, and Hokkaido.

=== Observation Deck ===
On the second floor is a free observation deck with a full view of runway and apron.
