= Japan National Route 273 =

Road in Hokkaido, Japan

National Route 273
- 国道273号

Route information
- Length: 235.2 km (146.1 mi)

Location
- Country: Japan

Highway system
- National highways of Japan; Expressways of Japan
← National Route 272	→ National Route 274

National Route 273 is a national highway of Japan connecting Obihiro, Hokkaidō and Monbetsu, Hokkaidō in Japan, with a total length of 235.2 km (146.15 mi).
