= Mount Teshio =

Mountain in the country of Japan

- 天塩岳
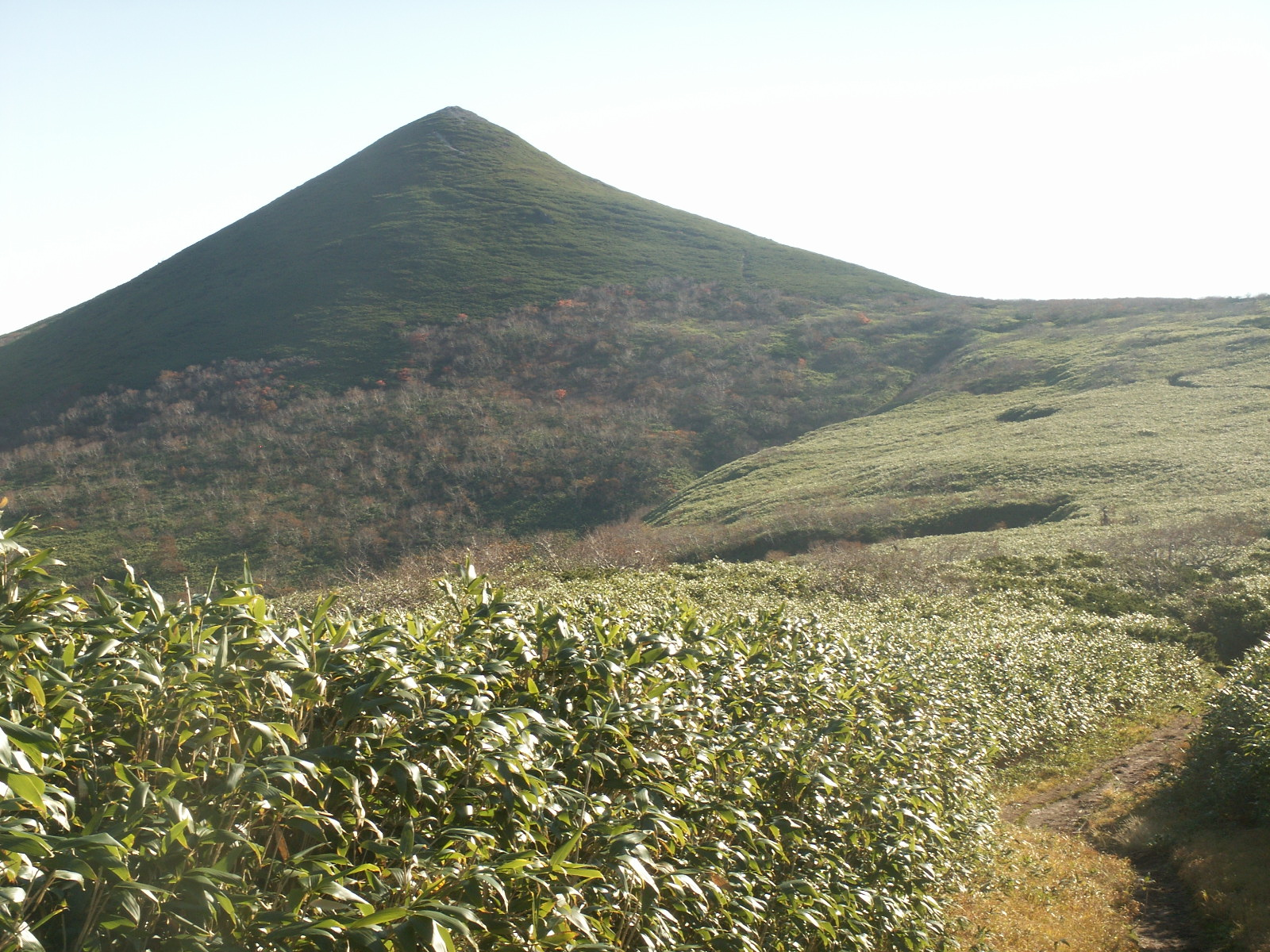
- Mount Teshio (October 2007)

Highest point
- Elevation: 1,557.6 m (5,110 ft)
- Listing: List of mountains and hills of Japan by height
- Coordinates: 43°57′52″N 142°53′17″E

Geography
- Location: On the border of Shibetsu and Takinoue, Hokkaidō, Japan
- Parent range: Kitami Mountains
- Topo map(s): Geographical Survey Institute 25000:1 天塩岳; 25000:1 宇江内山; 50000:1 旭川

Geology
- Rock age: Middle Miocene–Late Miocene
- Mountain type: volcanic
- Volcanic arc: Kurile Arc

Climbing
- Easiest route: Hike New Trail (新道コース, Shindō Course)

Mount Teshio (天塩岳, Teshio-dake) is the tallest mountain in the Kitami Mountains. It is located on the border of Shibetsu and Takinoue, Hokkaidō, Japan. It is the source of the Teshio River.

== History ==
On January 6, 1978, Mount Teshio and the surrounding region was designated the Mount Teshio Prefectural Natural Park (天塩岳道立自然公園, Teshio-dake Dōritsu Shizenkōen).

== Geology ==
Mount Teshio is composed of felsic non-alkali rock from 15 to 7 million years old.

== Flora and fauna ==
At the base of the mountain there are abundant black woodpeckers as well as Japanese red foxes and Hokkaidō brown bears. Near the summit, pika can be found.

Prominent alpine plants on the mountain are Rhododendron aureum and Diapensia lapponica.

== Popular Culture ==
Mount Teshio has been used to inspire the fictional location Teshio Ridge in the 2025 action-adventure video game Ghost of Yōtei. In the game, it serves as the primary location where the player hunts the Kitsune, a member of the Yōtei Six, the main antagonists of the game.

== Climbing routes ==
There are three climbing routes up the mountain:

- New Trail (新道コース) is 5.4 kilometres (3.4 mi) and 3.5 hours to the top.
- Mount Mae Teshio Trail (前天塩コース) is 9.1 kilometres (5.7 mi) and a 4-hour climb over Mount Mae Teshio.
- Historic Trail (旧道（沢）コース) starts on the Mount Mae Teshio trail and branches off. It is 4 kilometres (2.5 mi) and 3.5 hours to the top. This trail is only for experienced climbers.

There is a connecting path between the new trail and the other two trails.
