= Kitami Mountains =

Mountain range in Japan

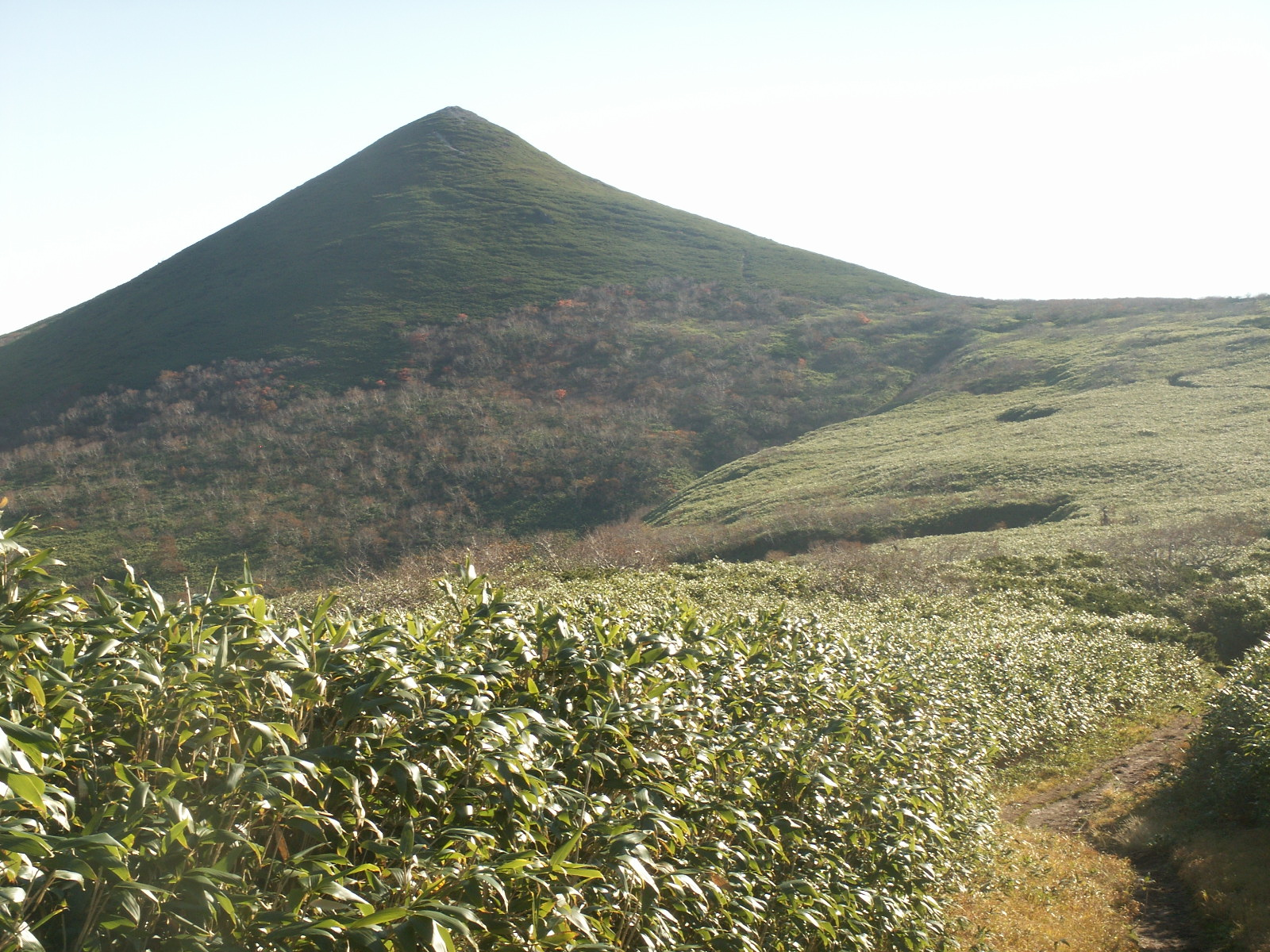
- Mount Teshio, the highest peak in the Kitami Mountains

Highest point
- Peak: Mount Teshio, Hokkaido, Japan
- Elevation: 1,558 m (5,112 ft)
- Coordinates: 43°57′52″N 142°53′17″E

Dimensions
- Length: 180 km (110 mi) Southeast-Northwest

Naming
- Native name: 北見山地 (Japanese); Kitami-sanchi (Japanese)

Geography
- Country: Japan
- State: Hokkaidō

Kitami Mountains (北見山地, Kitami-sanchi) is a mountain range of Hokkaidō, Japan. Unlike much of the rest of Japan, the Kitami Mountains are not very seismically active.

The Kitami Mountains are north of the Ishikari Mountains and east of the Teshio Mountains. A depression separates the Kitami Mountains from the Yūbari Mountains. The highest point in the Kitami Mountains is Mount Teshio. Mount Teshio sits atop the Wenshiri horst.

== Geology ==
Rocks from the Kitami mountains are mostly sedimentary from the Cretaceous-Paleogene periods. Volcanic rock was placed down on top of this from volcanoes that erupted in the Miocene or later.

The Kitami Mountains formed in the inner arc of the Kurile Arc.

== Mountains ==
- Mount Teshio (天塩岳) (1,558m)
- Mount Chitokaniushi (チトカニウシ山) (1,446m)
- Mount Shōkotsu (渚滑岳) (1,345m)
- Mount Uenshiri (ウエンシリ岳) (1,142m)
- Mount Hako (函岳) (1,129m)
- Mount Piyashiri (ピヤシリ山) (987m)
- Mount Utsu (鬱岳) (818m)
