= Monbetsu, Hokkaido =

Monbetsu 紋別市
- City
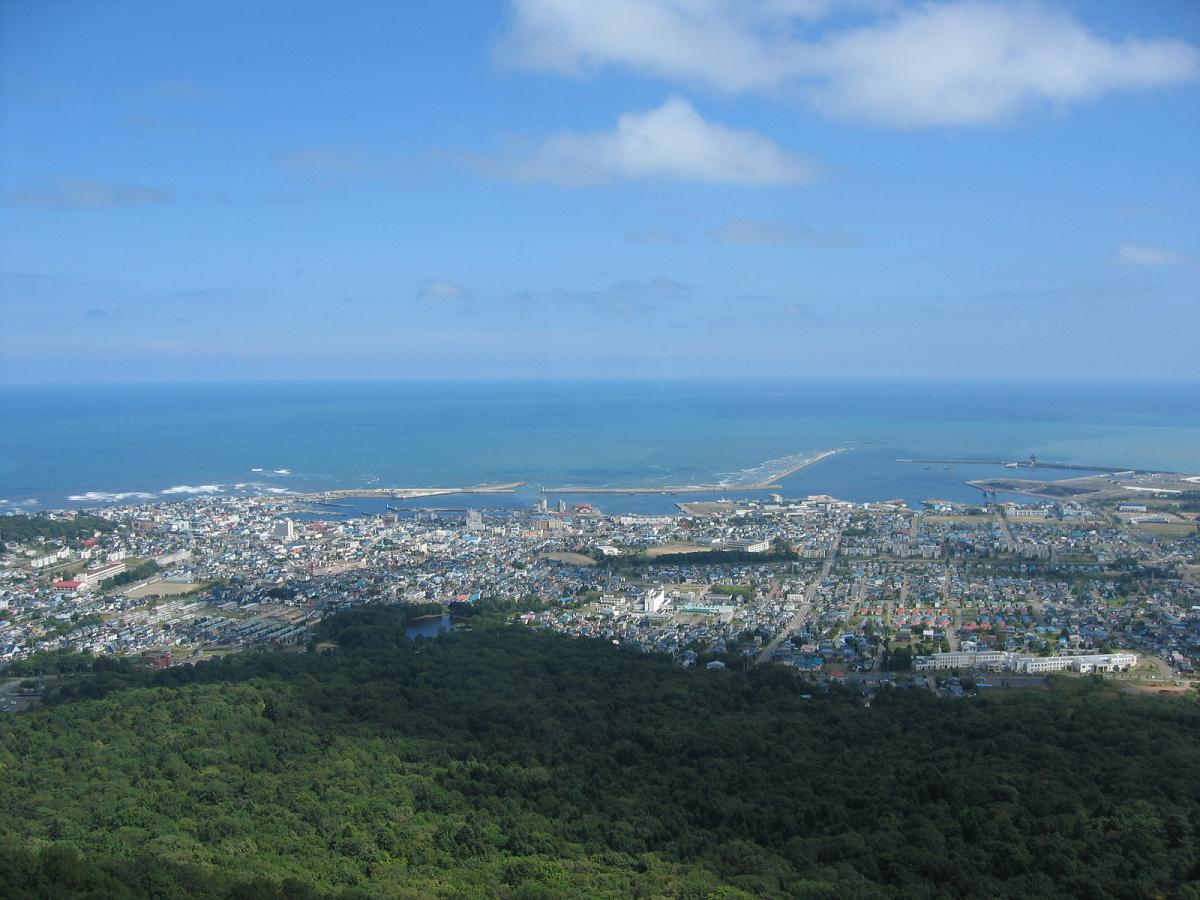
- The city viewed from Mount Monbetsu

- Flag Emblem

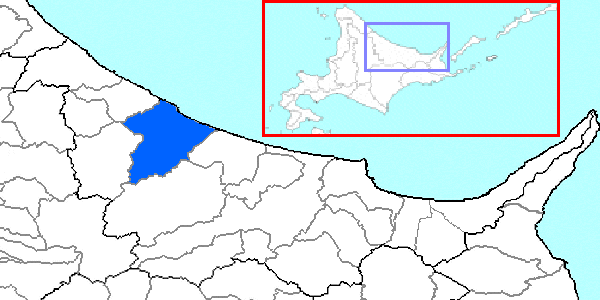
- Location of Monbetsu in Hokkaido (Okhotsk Subprefecture)

- Location in Japan
- Coordinates: 44°21′N 143°21′E
- Country: Japan
- Region: Hokkaido
- Prefecture: Hokkaido (Okhotsk Subprefecture)

Government
  - Mayor: Yoshikazu Miyakawa

Area
  - Total: 830.70 km^{2} (320.74 sq mi)

Population (June 30, 2026)
  - Total: 19,280
  - Density: 23.2/km^{2} (60/sq mi)
- Time zone: UTC+09:00 (JST)
- City hall address: 2-1-18, Saiwaichō, Mombetsu-shi, Hokkaidō; 094-8707
- Climate: Dfb
- Website: mombetsu.jp
- Symbols
- Flower: Rugosa Rose
- Tree: Japanese Rowan

Monbetsu (紋別市, Monbetsu-shi) is a city located in Okhotsk Subprefecture, Hokkaido, Japan; on the Sea of Okhotsk. The name comes from Ainu Mopet (Quiet River), Ainu "-pet" would be interpreted "-betsu" in Japanese as well of other city names in Hokkaido.

As of June 30, 2026, the city has an estimated population of 19,280 and a population density of 23.2 persons per km^{2}. The total area is 830.70 km^{2} (320.74 sq mi).

Most of Monbetsu's economy is dedicated to fishing for cold-water species such as crab. The crab from Monbetsu is reputedly the best in Japan, and is such a source of town pride that a sculpture of a crab claw nearly 10 meter tall was built on the waterfront. Famous for its horse racing track in which Andrew Musgrove, a local vice principal often frequents.

== History ==
- 1889: Village office established in Monbetsu
- 1909: Mobetsu Village (藻鼈村) and Monbetsu Village merge to form Monbetsu Village
- 1919: Monbetsu Village becomes Monbetsu Town
- July 1, 1954: Shokotsu Village (渚滑村) and Kamishokotsu Village (上渚滑村) merge with Monbetsu to form the city of Monbetsu

== Geography ==
The Shokotsu River flows through the city.

== Climate ==
Monbetsu has a humid continental climate (Köppen climate classification Dfb) with warm summers and cold winters. Precipitation falls throughout the year, but is heaviest from July to September.

Climate data for Monbetsu (elevation 15.8 m, 1991–2020 normals, extremes 1956–present)
Month	Jan	Feb	Mar	Apr	May	Jun	Jul	Aug	Sep	Oct	Nov	Dec	Year
Record high °C (°F)	9.5 (49.1)	17.1 (62.8)	18.7 (65.7)	30.8 (87.4)	37.0 (98.6)	32.7 (90.9)	36.5 (97.7)	35.2 (95.4)	34.2 (93.6)	29.4 (84.9)	22.5 (72.5)	16.5 (61.7)	37.0 (98.6)
Mean maximum °C (°F)	4.5 (40.1)	6.7 (44.1)	12.7 (54.9)	21.1 (70.0)	26.7 (80.1)	27.8 (82.0)	30.3 (86.5)	31.4 (88.5)	28.3 (82.9)	22.6 (72.7)	17.3 (63.1)	7.8 (46.0)	32.8 (91.0)
Mean daily maximum °C (°F)	−2.3 (27.9)	−2.0 (28.4)	2.3 (36.1)	9.0 (48.2)	14.2 (57.6)	16.7 (62.1)	20.6 (69.1)	22.9 (73.2)	20.7 (69.3)	14.9 (58.8)	7.2 (45.0)	0.3 (32.5)	10.4 (50.7)
Daily mean °C (°F)	−5.2 (22.6)	−5.3 (22.5)	−1.2 (29.8)	4.6 (40.3)	9.6 (49.3)	13.0 (55.4)	17.1 (62.8)	19.3 (66.7)	16.6 (61.9)	10.5 (50.9)	3.6 (38.5)	−2.6 (27.3)	6.7 (44.1)
Mean daily minimum °C (°F)	−8.7 (16.3)	−9.4 (15.1)	−5.0 (23.0)	0.7 (33.3)	5.6 (42.1)	9.9 (49.8)	14.4 (57.9)	16.4 (61.5)	12.8 (55.0)	6.2 (43.2)	0.0 (32.0)	−6.0 (21.2)	3.1 (37.6)
Mean minimum °C (°F)	−14.8 (5.4)	−15.7 (3.7)	−11.5 (11.3)	−4.6 (23.7)	0.4 (32.7)	4.7 (40.5)	9.8 (49.6)	12.1 (53.8)	7.1 (44.8)	0.9 (33.6)	−6.4 (20.5)	−11.6 (11.1)	−16.5 (2.3)
Record low °C (°F)	−21.8 (−7.2)	−24.7 (−12.5)	−22.7 (−8.9)	−11.2 (11.8)	−3.3 (26.1)	−0.3 (31.5)	4.3 (39.7)	5.6 (42.1)	1.6 (34.9)	−2.2 (28.0)	−11.8 (10.8)	−17.0 (1.4)	−24.7 (−12.5)
Average precipitation mm (inches)	44.4 (1.75)	33.2 (1.31)	35.4 (1.39)	45.7 (1.80)	58.4 (2.30)	69.8 (2.75)	108.6 (4.28)	122.0 (4.80)	127.6 (5.02)	88.1 (3.47)	64.6 (2.54)	59.3 (2.33)	860.8 (33.89)
Average snowfall cm (inches)	87 (34)	77 (30)	62 (24)	16 (6.3)	1 (0.4)	0 (0)	0 (0)	0 (0)	0 (0)	0 (0)	21 (8.3)	75 (30)	338 (133)
Average precipitation days (≥ 0.5 mm)	16.3	14.4	13.1	11.6	11.0	11.8	12.3	12.2	12.4	12.5	15.6	16.7	160.0
Average snowy days (≥ 1 cm)	18.7	16.3	14.5	3.8	0.3	0.0	0.0	0.0	0.0	0.1	5.3	15.8	74.6
Average relative humidity (%)	73	73	70	67	73	83	85	83	77	71	70	71	75
Mean monthly sunshine hours	98.7	114.2	160.1	174.7	179.3	154.7	143.2	145.0	157.3	149.3	103.5	95.2	1,675.2
Source: Japan Meteorological Agency (1991–2020 normals, extremes 1956–present)

Climate data for Monbetsu Komukai, Monbetsu (elevation 18 m, 2003–2020 normals, snowfall 2008–2020, extremes 2003–present)
Month	Jan	Feb	Mar	Apr	May	Jun	Jul	Aug	Sep	Oct	Nov	Dec	Year
Record high °C (°F)	9.1 (48.4)	16.4 (61.5)	18.0 (64.4)	26.8 (80.2)	37.2 (99.0)	35.2 (95.4)	34.9 (94.8)	34.6 (94.3)	33.1 (91.6)	29.3 (84.7)	22.7 (72.9)	15.6 (60.1)	37.2 (99.0)
Mean daily maximum °C (°F)	−2.5 (27.5)	−2.2 (28.0)	2.3 (36.1)	9.0 (48.2)	14.6 (58.3)	17.3 (63.1)	21.0 (69.8)	23.4 (74.1)	21.2 (70.2)	15.1 (59.2)	7.5 (45.5)	0.6 (33.1)	10.6 (51.1)
Daily mean °C (°F)	−5.8 (21.6)	−5.9 (21.4)	−1.3 (29.7)	4.3 (39.7)	9.5 (49.1)	13.1 (55.6)	17.1 (62.8)	19.5 (67.1)	16.5 (61.7)	10.1 (50.2)	3.4 (38.1)	−2.8 (27.0)	6.5 (43.7)
Mean daily minimum °C (°F)	−10.6 (12.9)	−11.3 (11.7)	−5.7 (21.7)	−0.5 (31.1)	4.3 (39.7)	9.2 (48.6)	13.8 (56.8)	15.9 (60.6)	12.1 (53.8)	4.9 (40.8)	−1.1 (30.0)	−7.4 (18.7)	2.0 (35.6)
Record low °C (°F)	−22.5 (−8.5)	−23.9 (−11.0)	−17.3 (0.9)	−14.5 (5.9)	−3.7 (25.3)	0.2 (32.4)	6.5 (43.7)	7.8 (46.0)	2.5 (36.5)	−4.8 (23.4)	−10.9 (12.4)	−19.8 (−3.6)	−23.9 (−11.0)
Average precipitation mm (inches)	—	—	—	—	—	67.8 (2.67)	97.0 (3.82)	130.3 (5.13)	91.9 (3.62)	—	—	—	—
Average snowfall cm (inches)	104 (41)	96 (38)	68 (27)	24 (9.4)	1 (0.4)	0 (0)	0 (0)	0 (0)	0 (0)	1 (0.4)	32 (13)	95 (37)	424 (167)
Average precipitation days (≥ 1.0 mm)	—	—	—	—	—	9.4	8.8	10.1	9.9	—	—	—	—
Source: Japan Meteorological Agency (2003–2020 normals, snowfall 2008–2020, extremes 2003–present)

== Transportation ==
Monbetsu does not have passenger rail service. There are buses to Sapporo and Asahikawa.

Monbetsu Airport offers a daily ANA flight to Tokyo. The other nearest airport is Memanbetsu Airport located 109 km away from the city which also offers flights to Sapporo and other Japanese cities in addition to Tokyo.

Shokotsu Line and Nayoro Main Line used to run in the city.

== Education ==
=== High school ===
- Hokkaido Monbetsu High School

== Sightseeing ==
Monbetsu is famous for drift ice, a yearly phenomenon which reaches the city every January or February from the northern Sea of Okhotsk. As such, the city has taken on the drift ice as its symbol and has become a center for research on sea ice generally, with an international conference held in February (usually the time of peak sea ice) each year. There is also a yearly Drift Ice Festival that coincides with the Sapporo Snow Festival. The festival features impressive sculptures built out of drift ice along with a large ice maze. Additionally, the Okhotsk Tower is a facility where one can observe sea ice from both high above, and from below the ocean. It is complete with an information center and aquarium. An icebreaker, the Garinko II, departs from nearby and makes regular sightseeing cruises through the drift ice during the winter. Monbetsu is also home to the Okhotsk Sea Ice Museum of Hokkaido, which covers all aspects of sea ice and features a sub-zero room and "frozen aquarium" of various fish preserved in ice.

Monbetsu is also home to Japan's only seal rescue and rehabilitation facility, the Okhotsk Tokkari Center. Here, visitors can observe seals swim and complete tricks in outdoor pools. A separate facility, Seal Sea Paradise, is located a few minutes walk from the Okhotsk Tokkari Center. Both house mainly spotted and ringed seals.

During the summertime, when the sea ice melts, sailors from Russia are a common sight in the city. Some local businesses have banned Russian visitors for their supposed "unruly" behavior, which has led some activists to criticize Monbetsu as a hotbed of racial discrimination.

== Mascot ==
Monta, the town's mascot

Monbetsu's mascot is Monta (紋太). He is a curious, festive and exciting 53-year-old harbor seal. He usually wears a happi coat with an iceberg motif, a belly band (which is his charm point as it helps him give extra warmth during the winter and extra coolness during the summer) and a scallop as a wig. As a seal, he can resist the extreme weather (both cold and hot). He sometimes wear salmon roes, crab claws and salmon as wigs. Despite his old age, he can go scuba diving. He lives in the Hokkaidoritsu Okhotsk Ryuhyo Park (which is also his workplace). He usually goes to festivals and the Port of Monbetsu. His hobbies are fishing, studying the sea and taking naps on drift ice (during the winter) and at the Okhotsk White Beach (during the summer). He likes all kinds of seafood but try to offer him some sweets and vegetables and he will refuse them for health reasons. His goal is to be a good elder when it comes to promoting the city. Whenever anyone sees him, he brings smiles.

== Sister cities ==
Monbetsu's sister cities are

- Newport, Oregon, United States (1966)
- Korsakov, Russia (1991)
- Fairbanks, Alaska, United States (1991)
