= Mount Myōjin =

Mountain in the country of Japan

- 明神岳
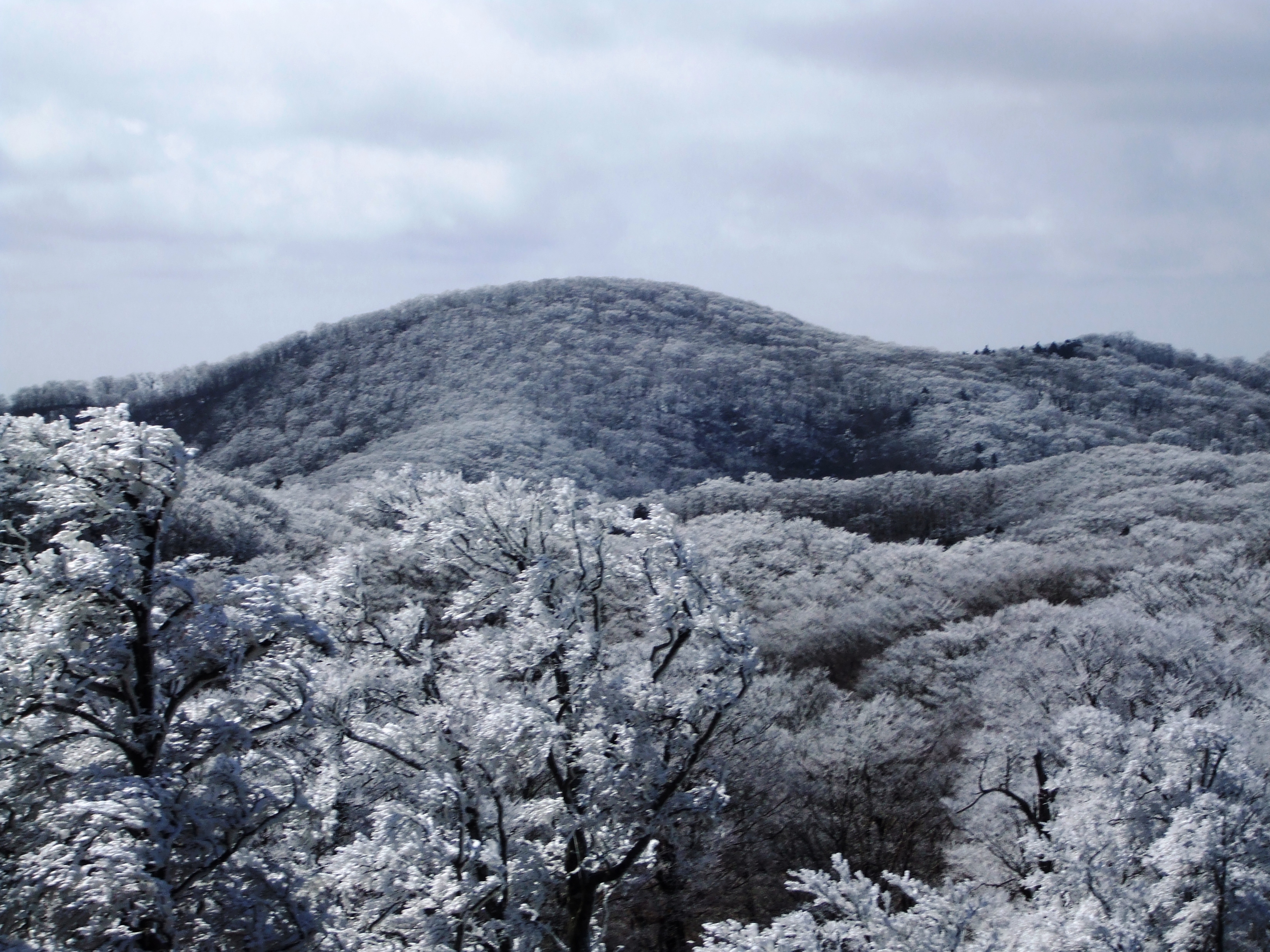
- Mount Myōjin from east

Highest point
- Elevation: 1,432 m (4,698 ft)
- Listing: List of mountains and hills of Japan by height
- Coordinates: 34°21′39″N 136°5′42″E

Naming
- Language of name: Japanese
- Pronunciation: [mjoːdʑindake]

Geography
- Location: Matsusaka, Mie and Kawakami, Nara, Japan
- Parent range: Daikō Mountains

Mount Myōjin (明神岳, Myōjin-dake) is a 1,432 m (4,698 ft) mountain, on the border of Matsusaka, Mie and Kawakami, Nara, Japan. This mountain is one of Daikō Mountains.

== Routes ==
There are two major routes to the top of Mount Myōjin. The route from Maakodani Tozanguchi takes about three hours. The other route is via Myōjindaira from Ōmata Bus Stop of Nara Kōtsu. It takes about three and half hours.

== Access ==
- Ōmata Bus Stop of Nara Kōtsu

== Gallery ==
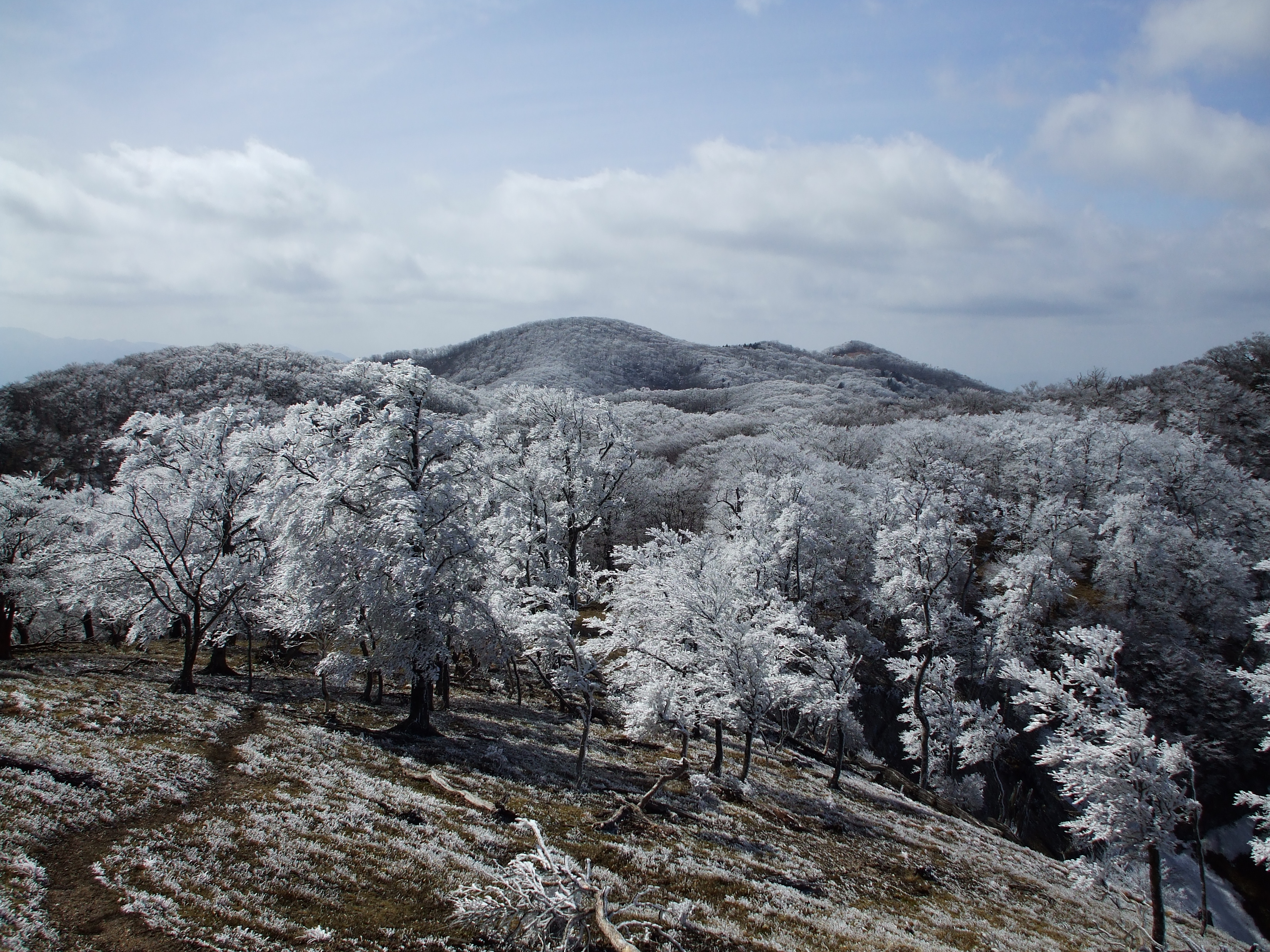
Mount Myōjin from Mount Hinokizuka Okumine (03/2009)

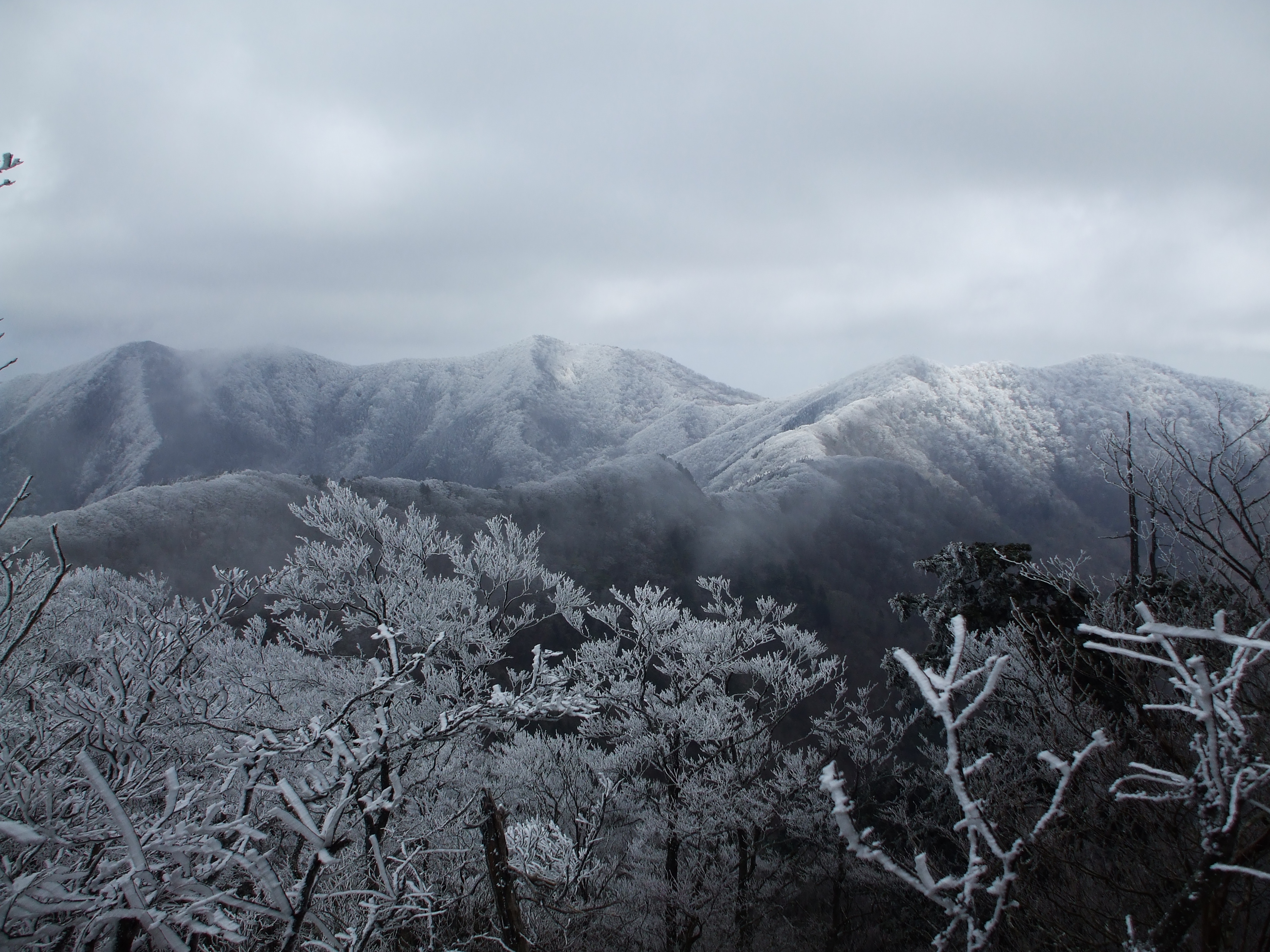
Mount Myōjin from Mount Azami (03/2009)

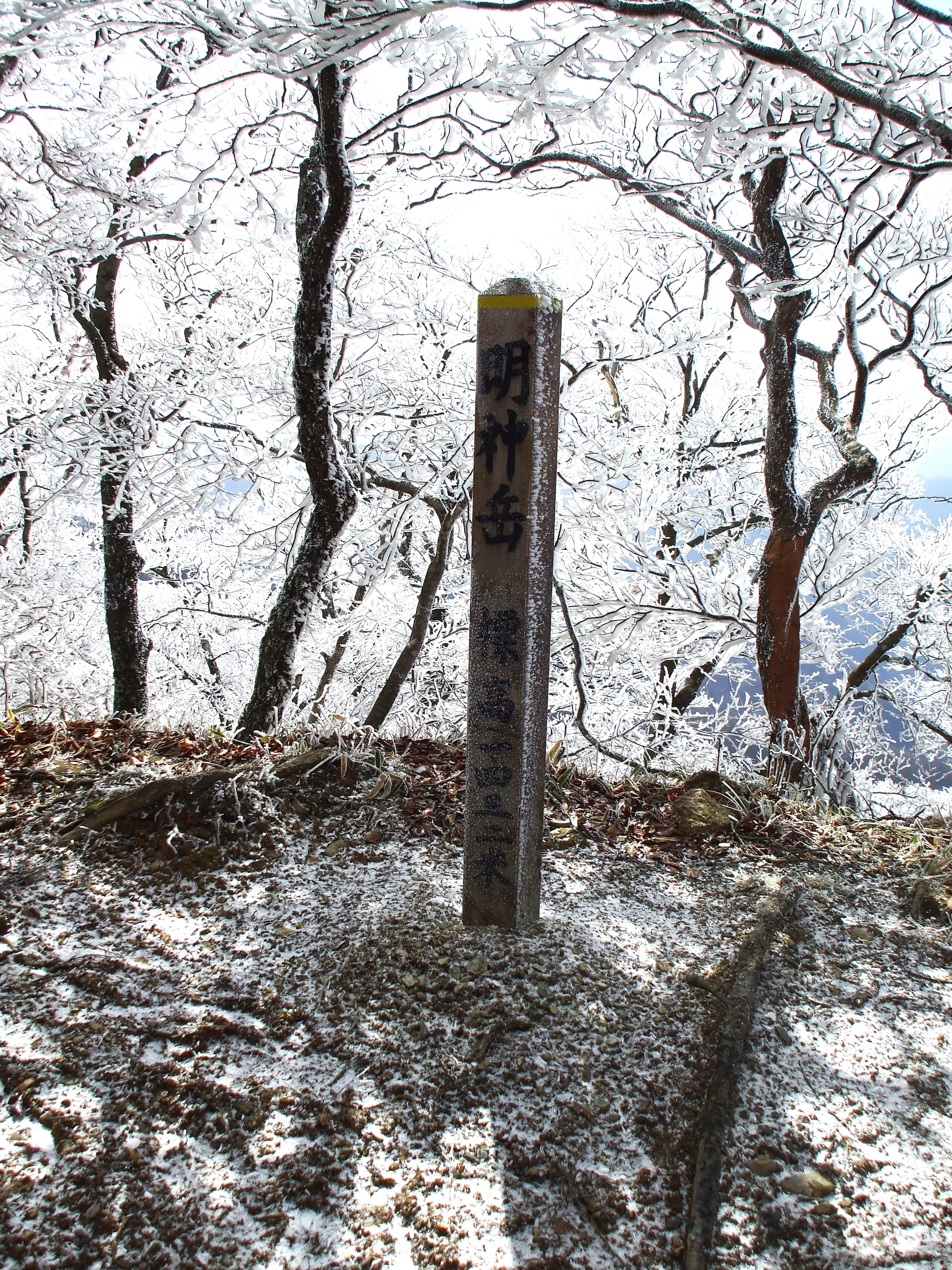
The top of Mount Myōjin (03/2009)

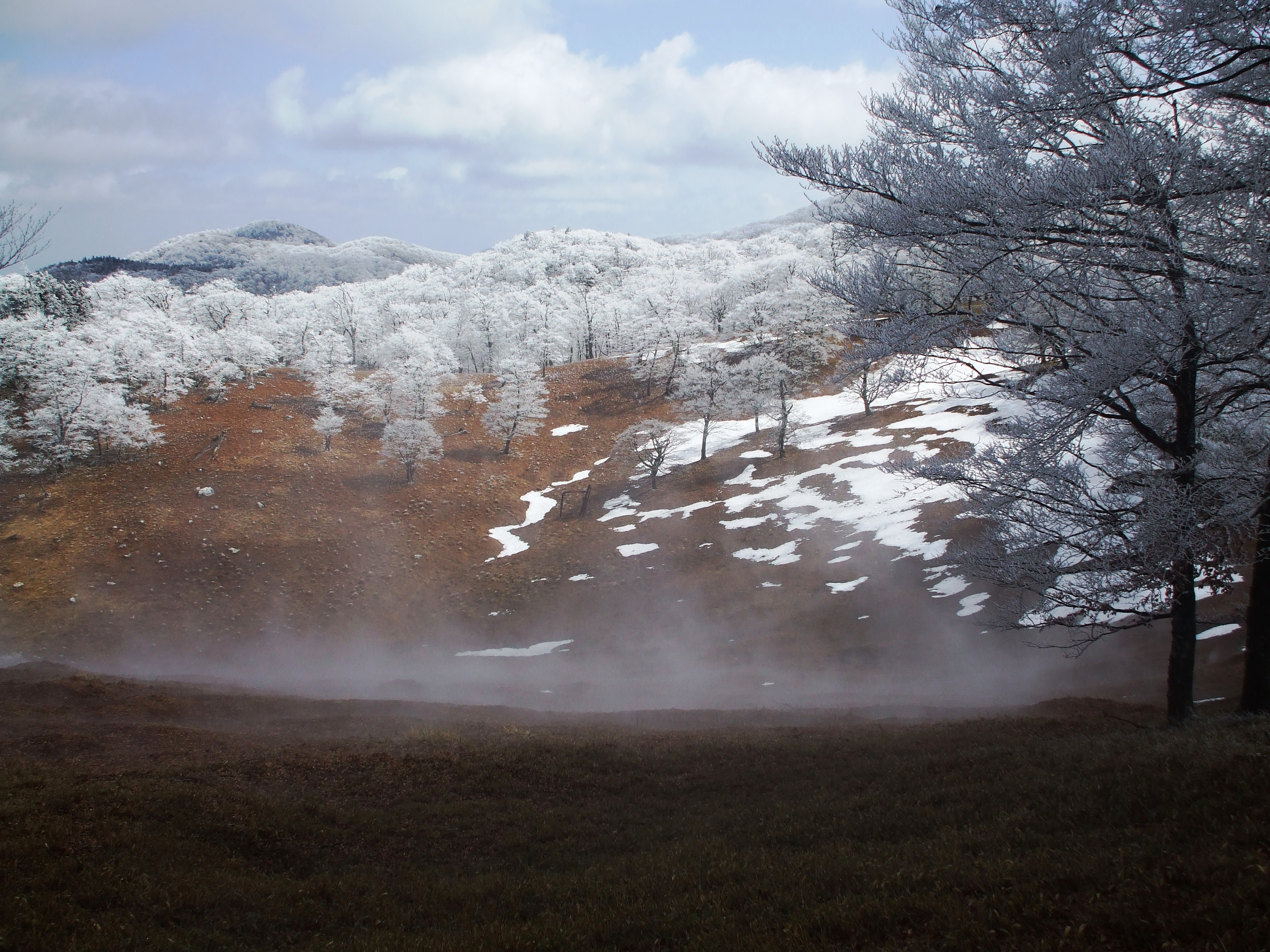
Myojindaira on the way to Mount Myōjin (03/2009)

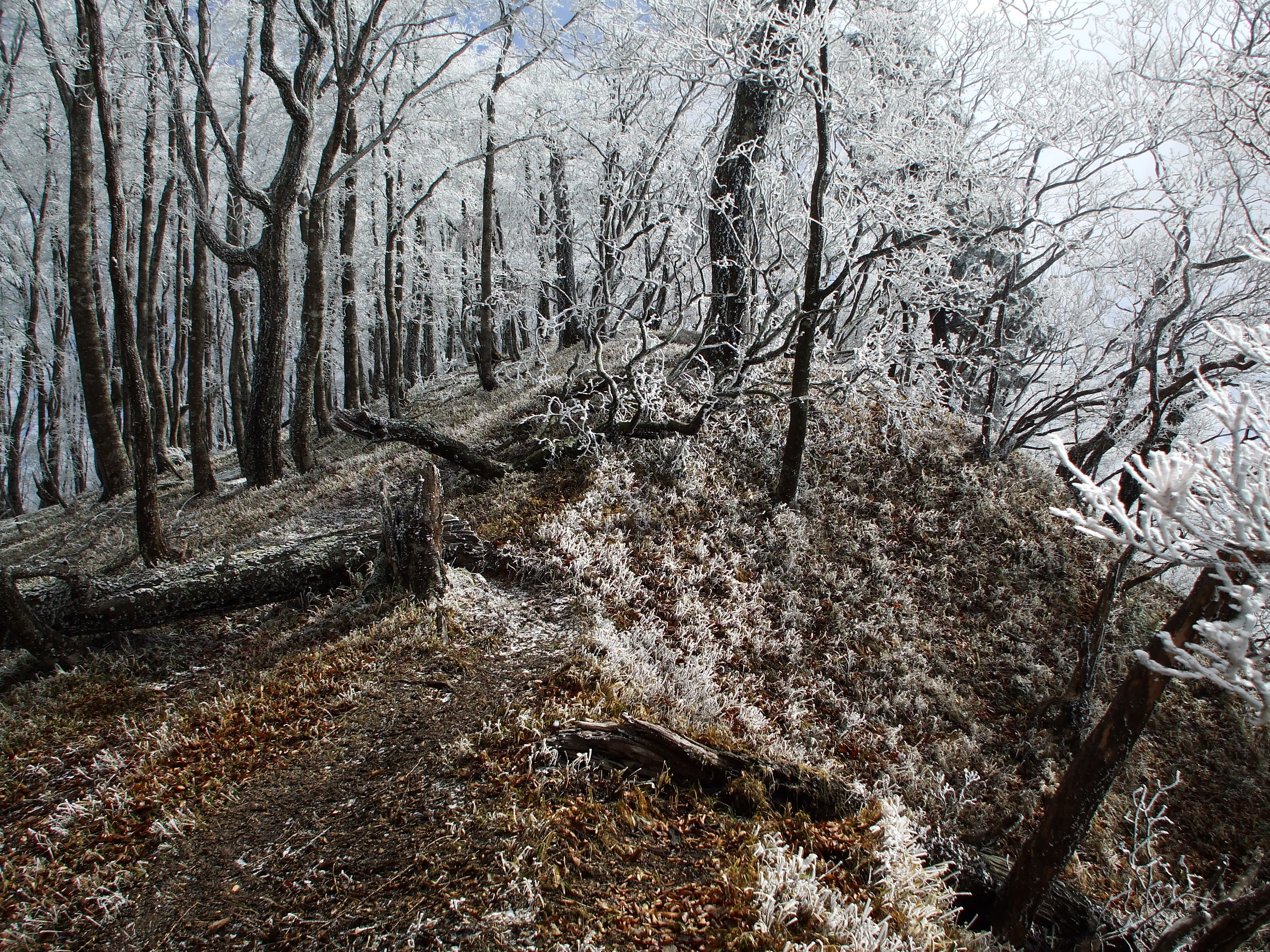
On the way to Mount Myōjin (03/2009)

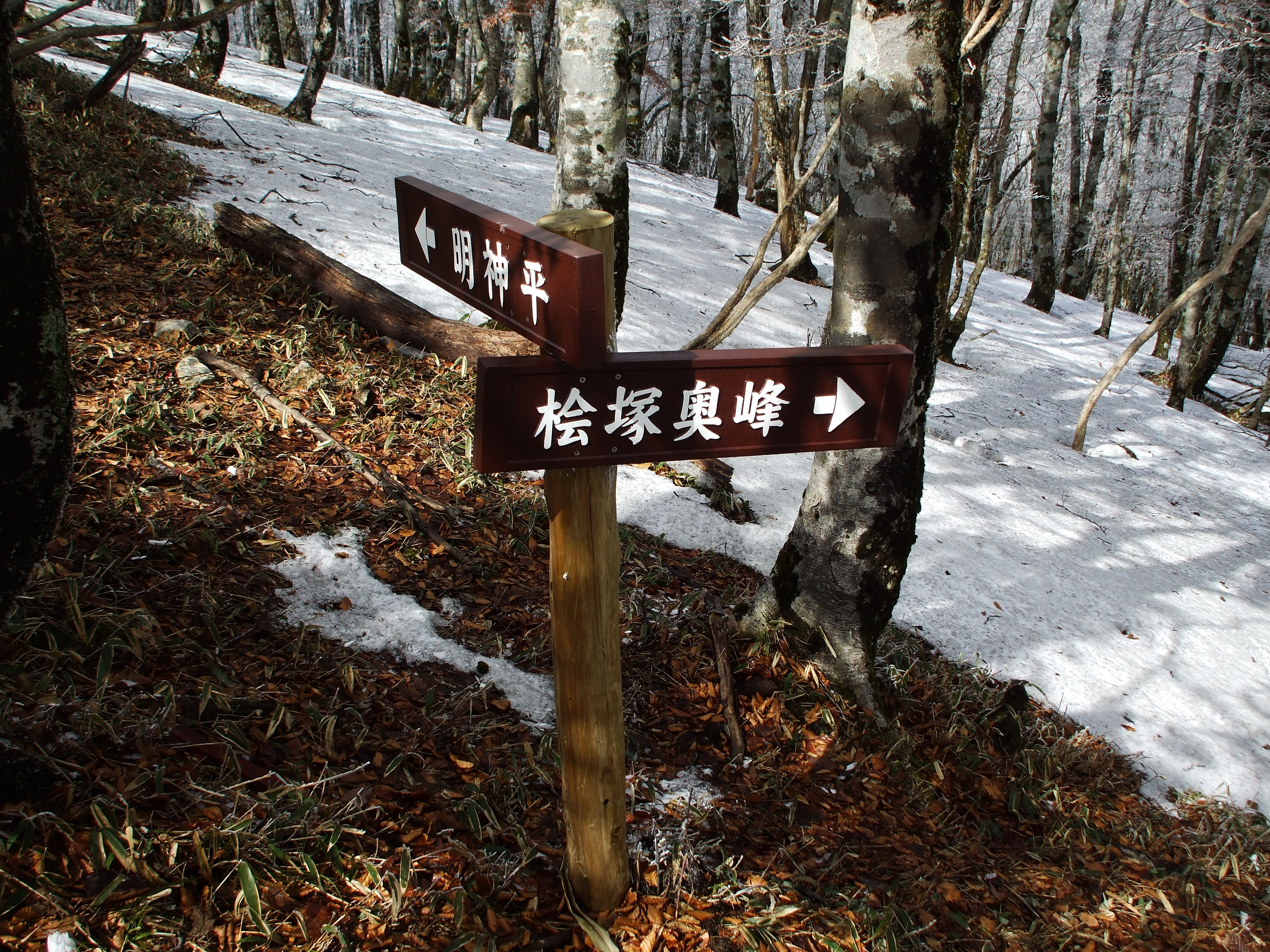
A view at Mount Myōjin (03/2009)

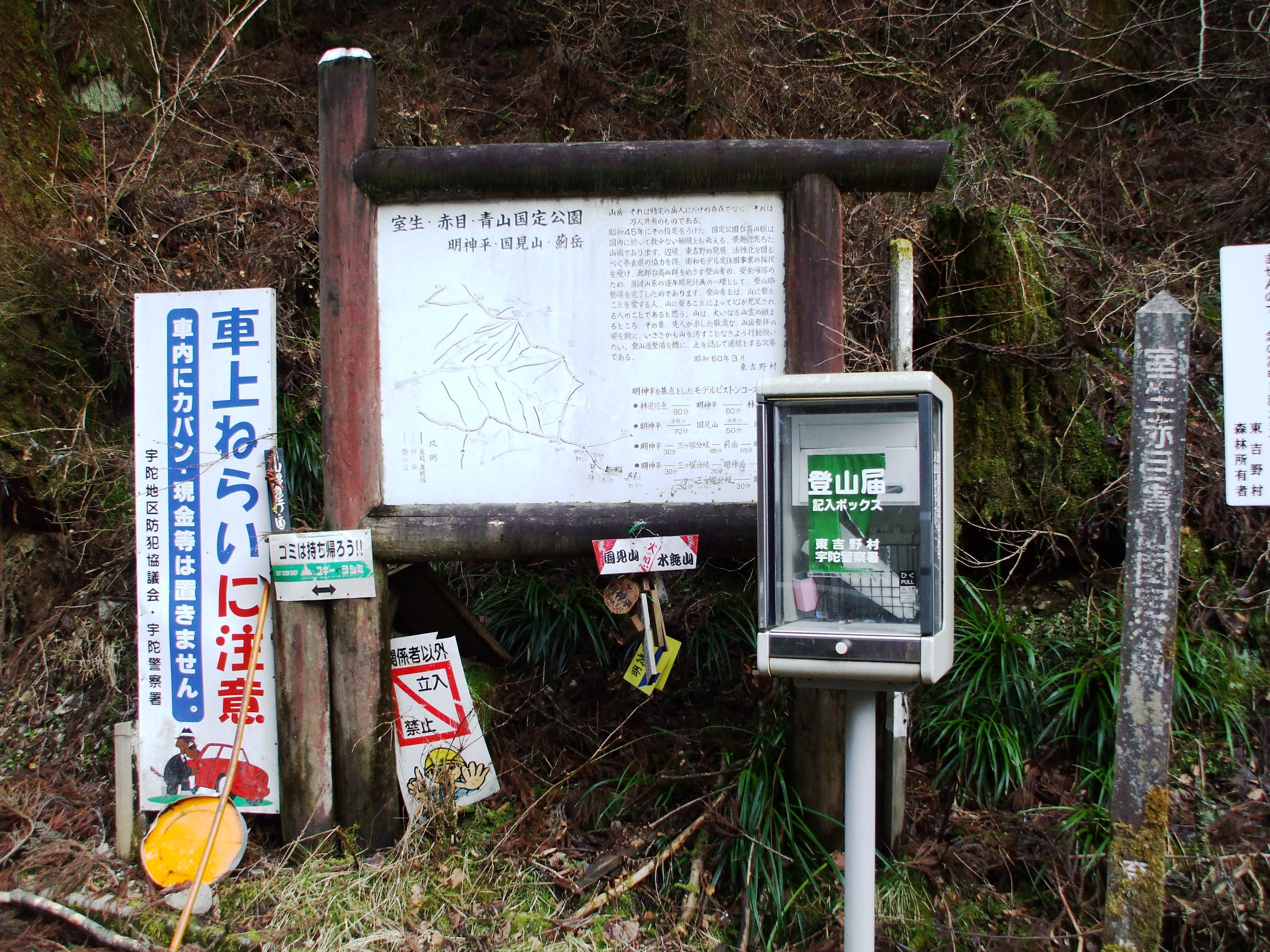
The entrance of a climbing route to Mount Myōjin (03/2009)

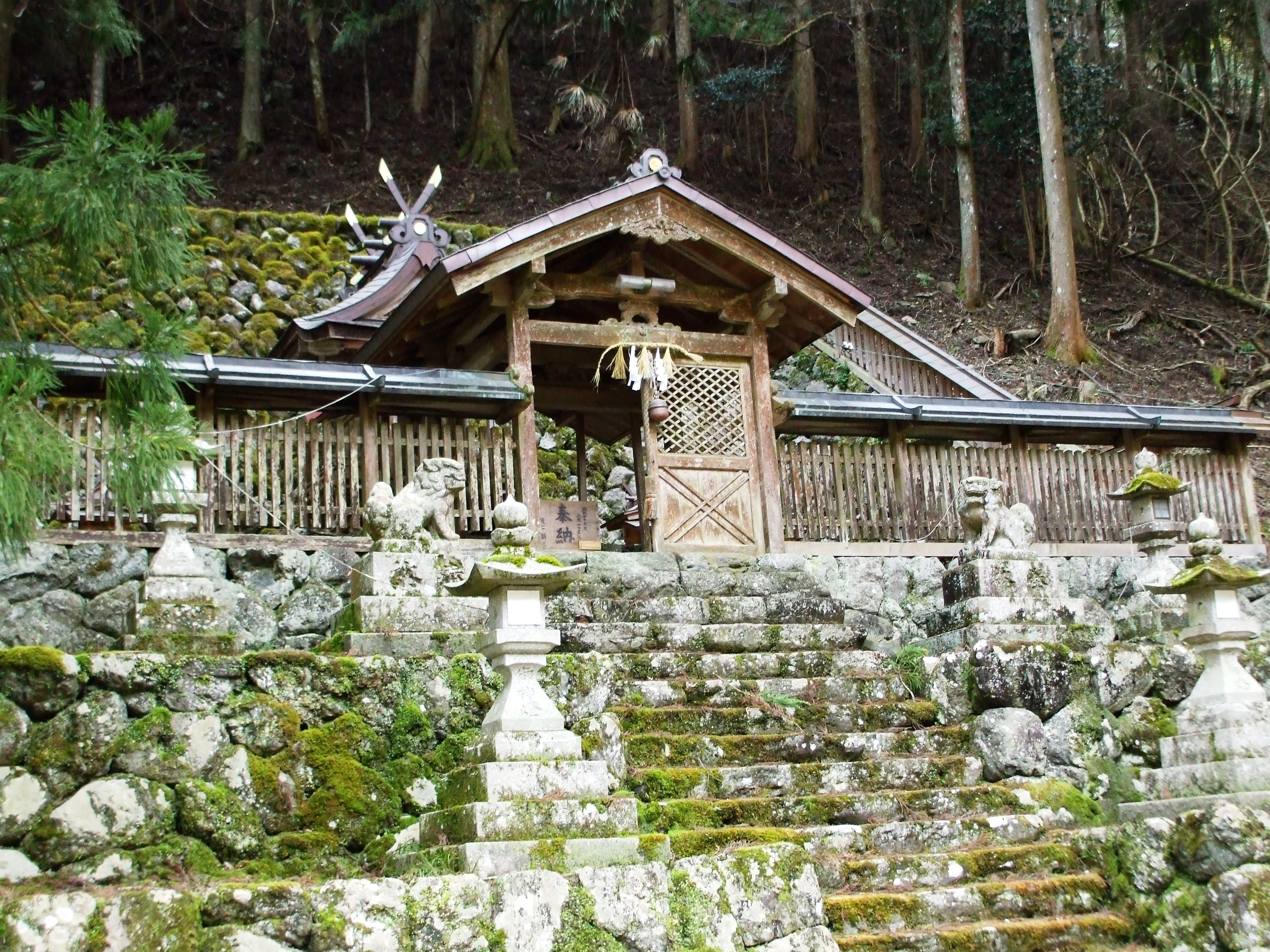
Sasano Shrine at Ōmata (03/2009)
