= Mount Hinokizuka Okumine =

Mountain in Japan

- 桧塚奥峰
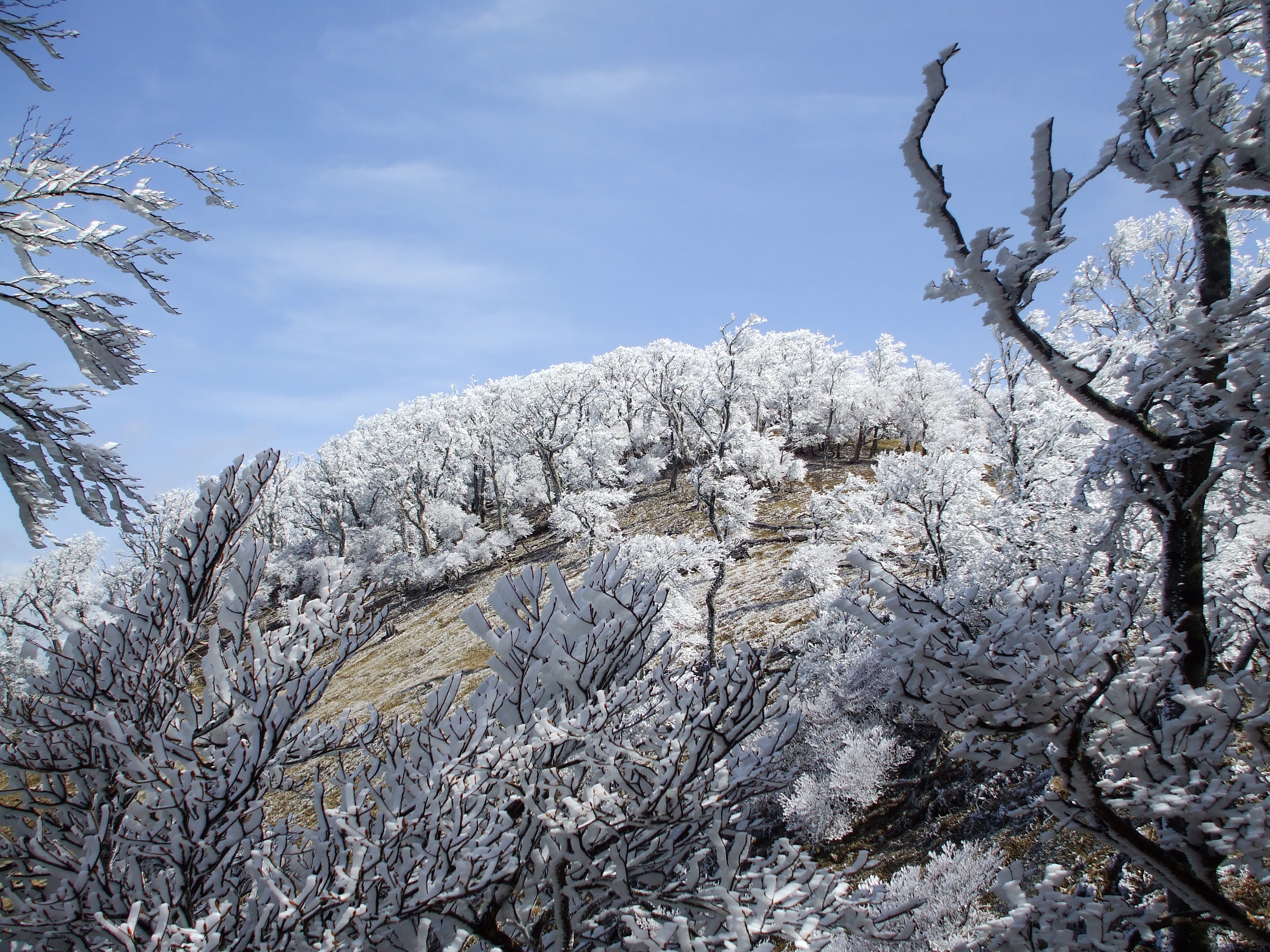
- Mount Hinokizuka Okumine from west

Highest point
- Elevation: 1,420 m (4,660 ft)
- Listing: List of mountains and hills of Japan by height
- Coordinates: 34°21′50″N 136°6′43″E

Naming
- Language of name: Japanese
- Pronunciation: [çinokizukaokumine]

Geography
- Location: Matsusaka, Mie, Japan
- Parent range: Daikō Mountains

Mount Hinokizukia Okumine (桧塚奥峰, Hinokizuka-okumine) is a 1,420 m (4,659 ft) mountain, in Matsusaka, Mie, Japan.

== Outline ==
Mount Hinokizuka Okumine is one of Daikō Mountains. It is the tallest mountain of mountains in Mie Prefecture, which are not on the border with other prefectures.

== Route ==
To the top of Mount Hinokizuka Okumine, there are two major routes. One is from Maakodani Tozanguchi, it takes two hours and 15 minutes. The other is via Myōjindaira and Mount Myōjin. It takes two hours and 40 minutes from the nearest parking space. If public transportation is used, it takes another 70 minutes from Ōmata Bus Stop of Nara Kōtsu.

== Access ==
- Ōmata Bus Stop of Nara Kōtsu

== Gallery ==
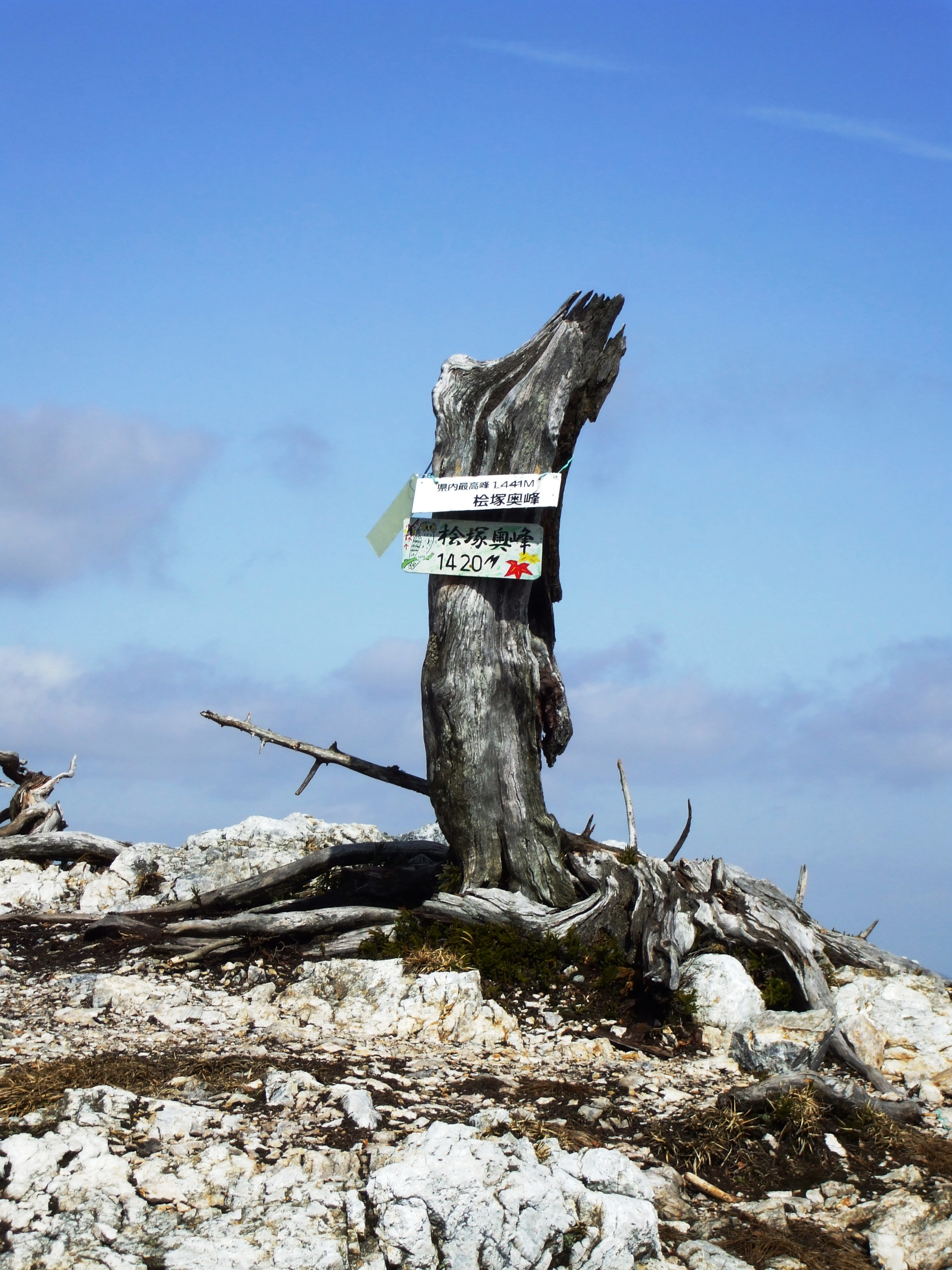
The top of Mount Hinokizuka Okumine (03/2009)

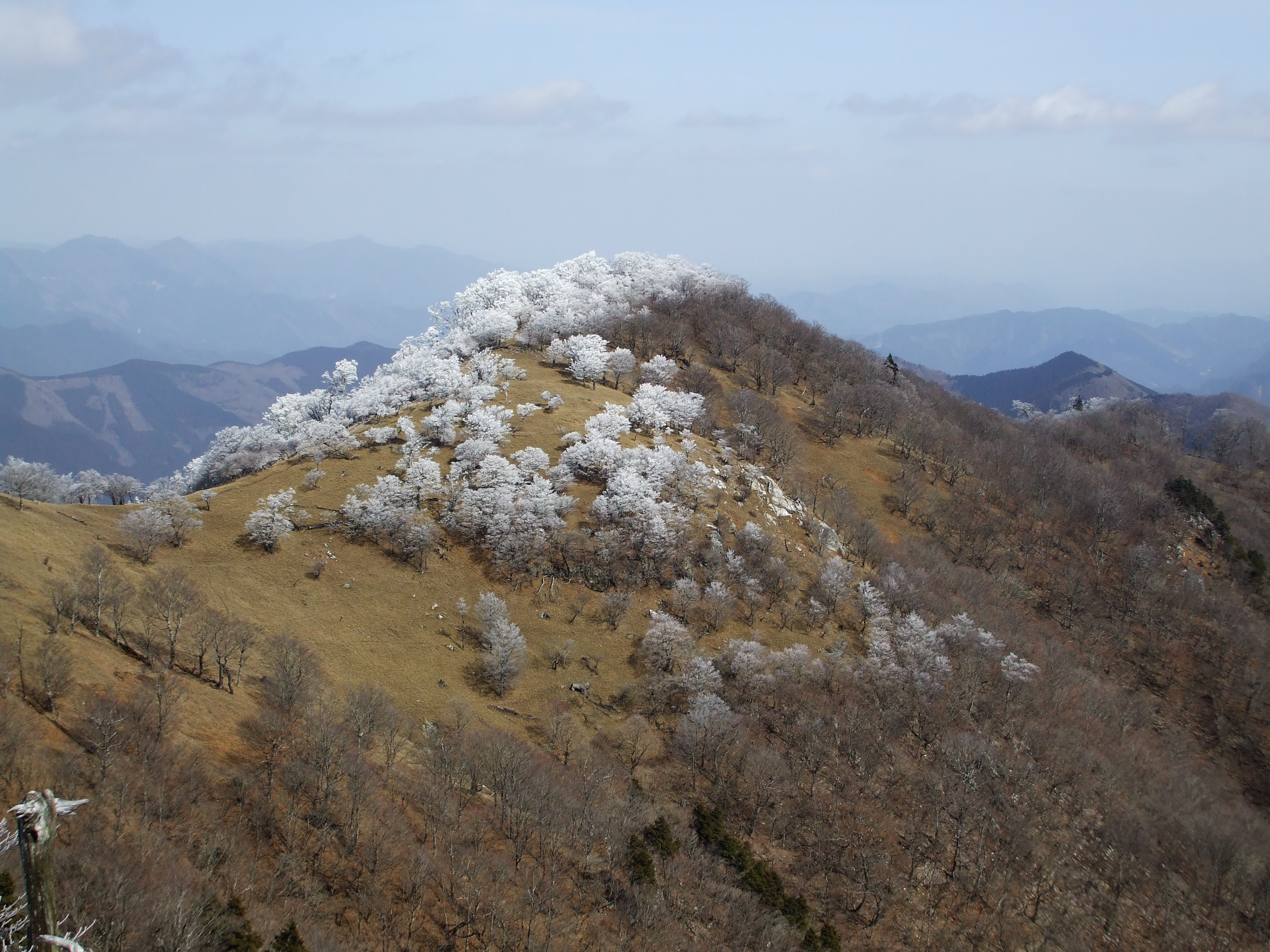
Mount Hinokizuka from the top of Mount Hinokizuka Okumine (03/2009)

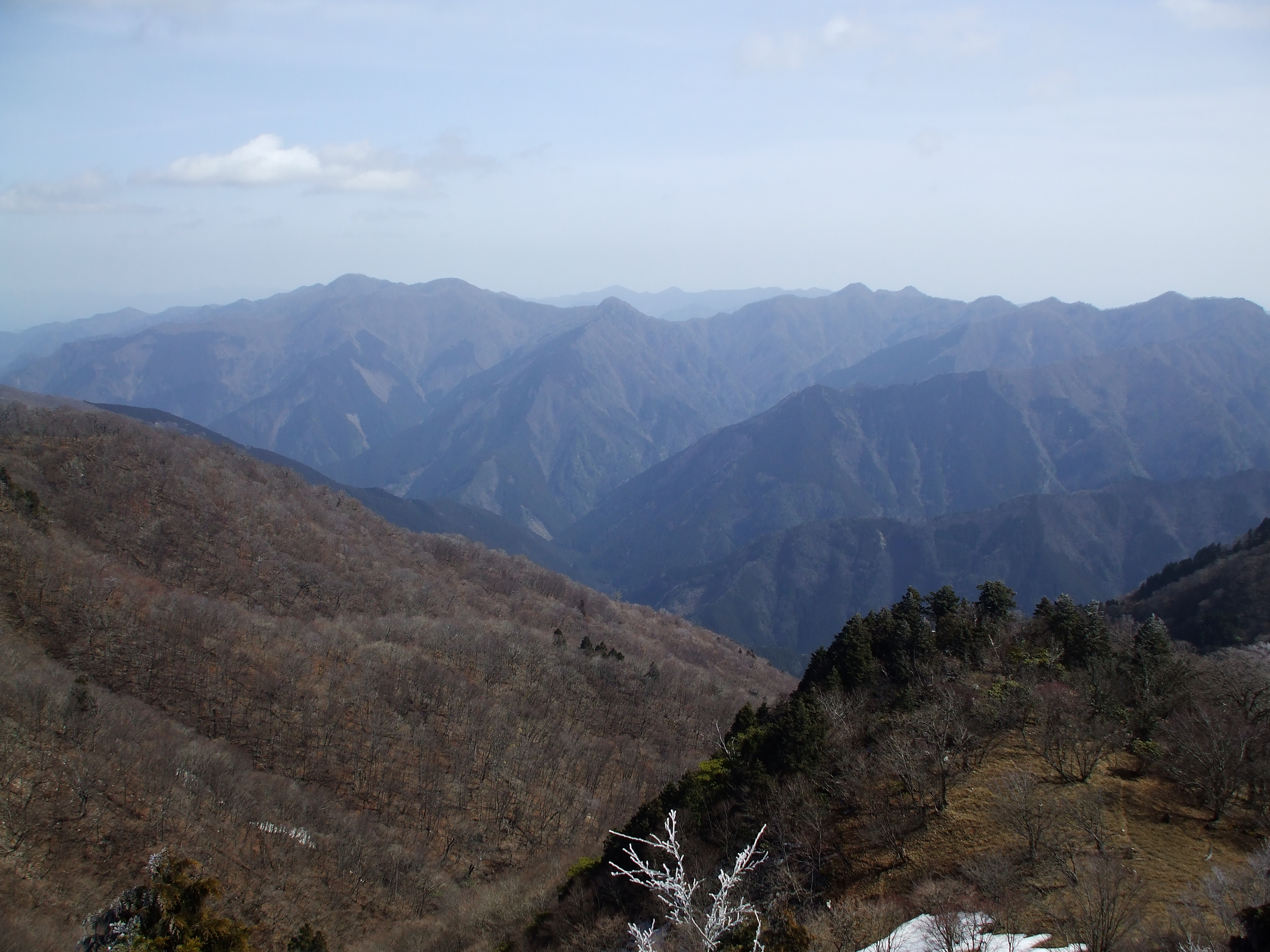
Mount Ōdaigahara and Mount Ikegoya from the top of Mount Hinokizuka Okumine (03/2009)

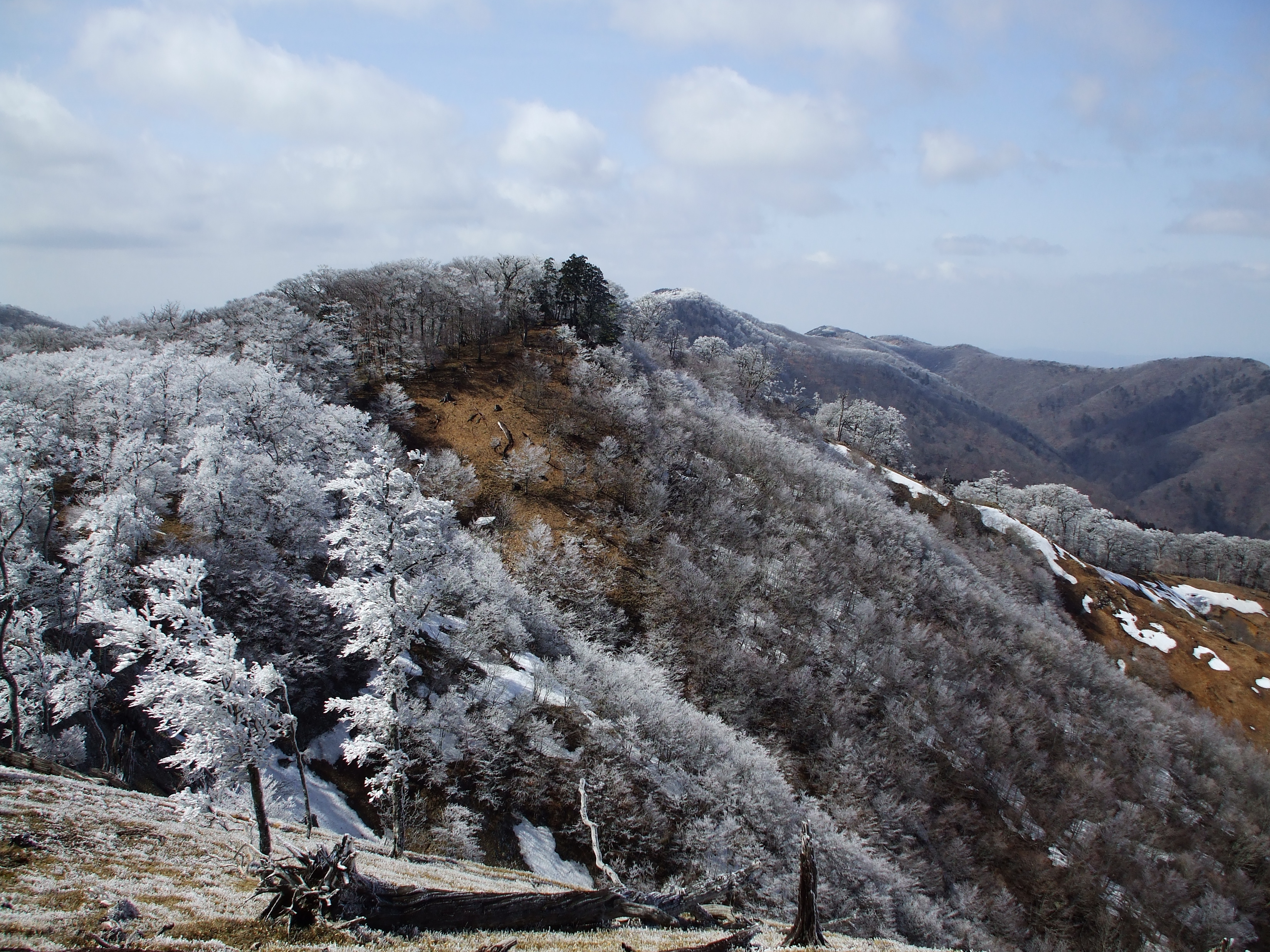
Eastside view from the top of Mount Hinokizuka Okumine (03/2009)

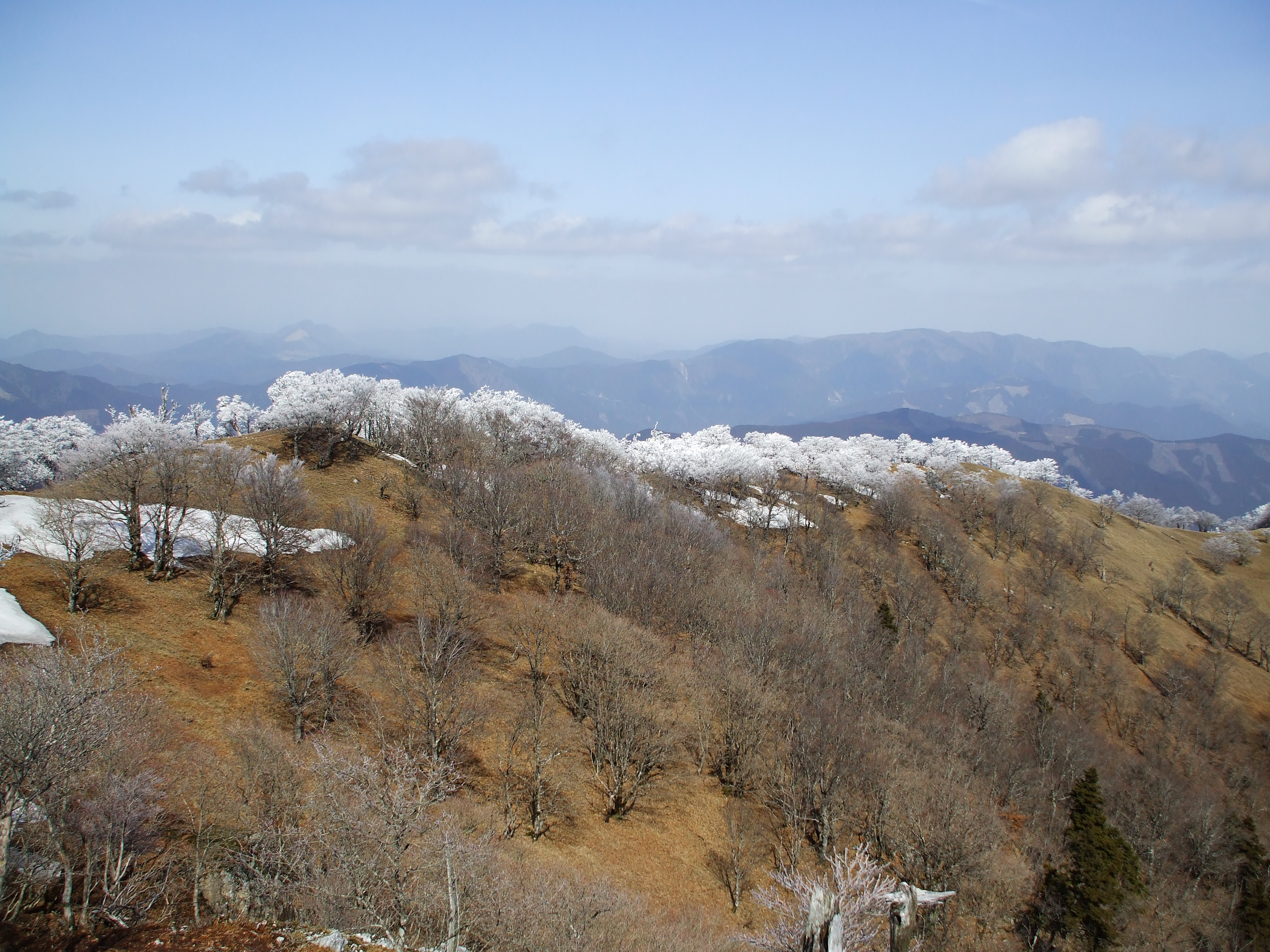
Northside view from the top of Mount Hinokizuka Okumine (03/2009)

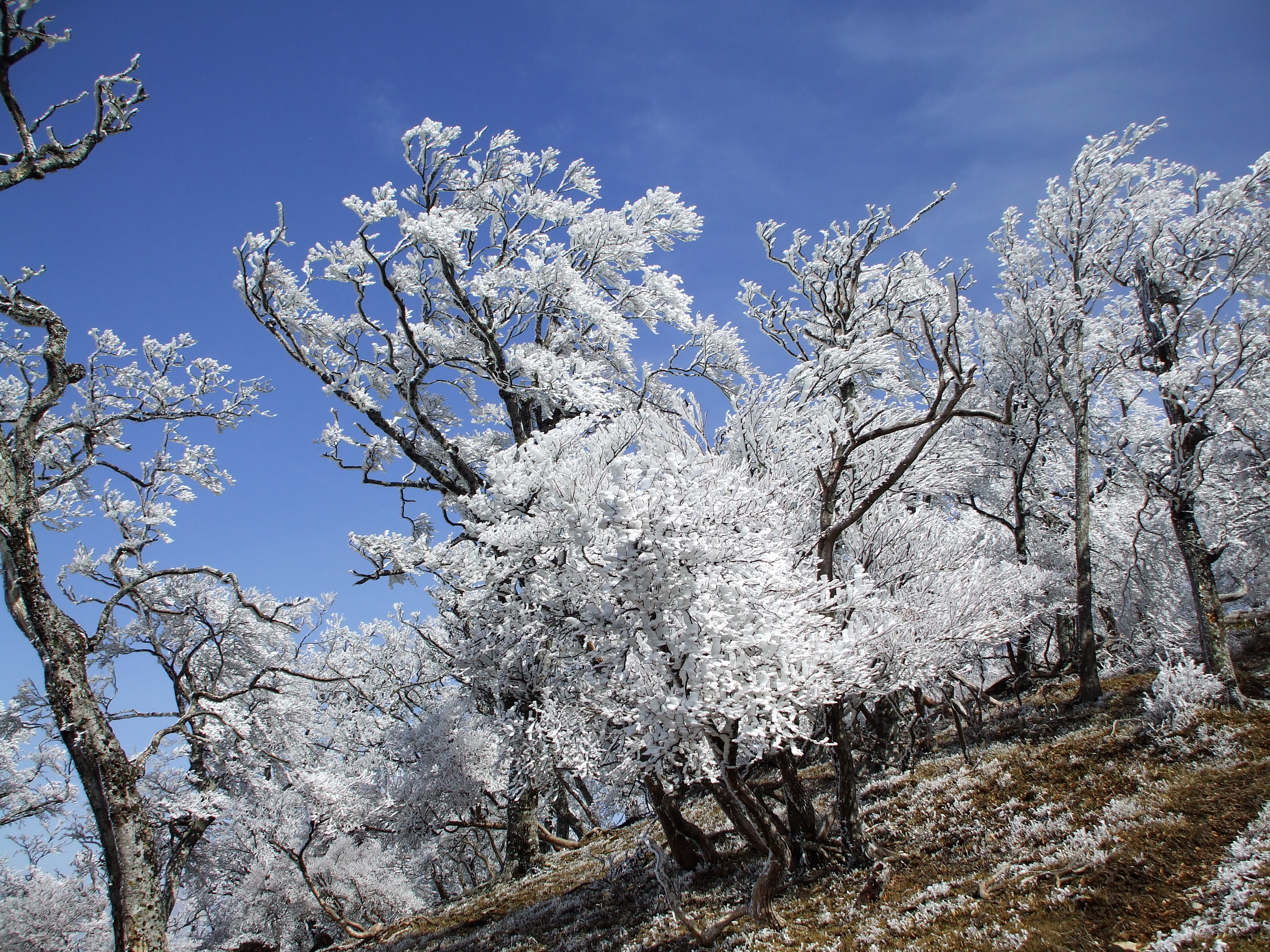
A view at Mount Hinokizuka Okumine (03/2009)

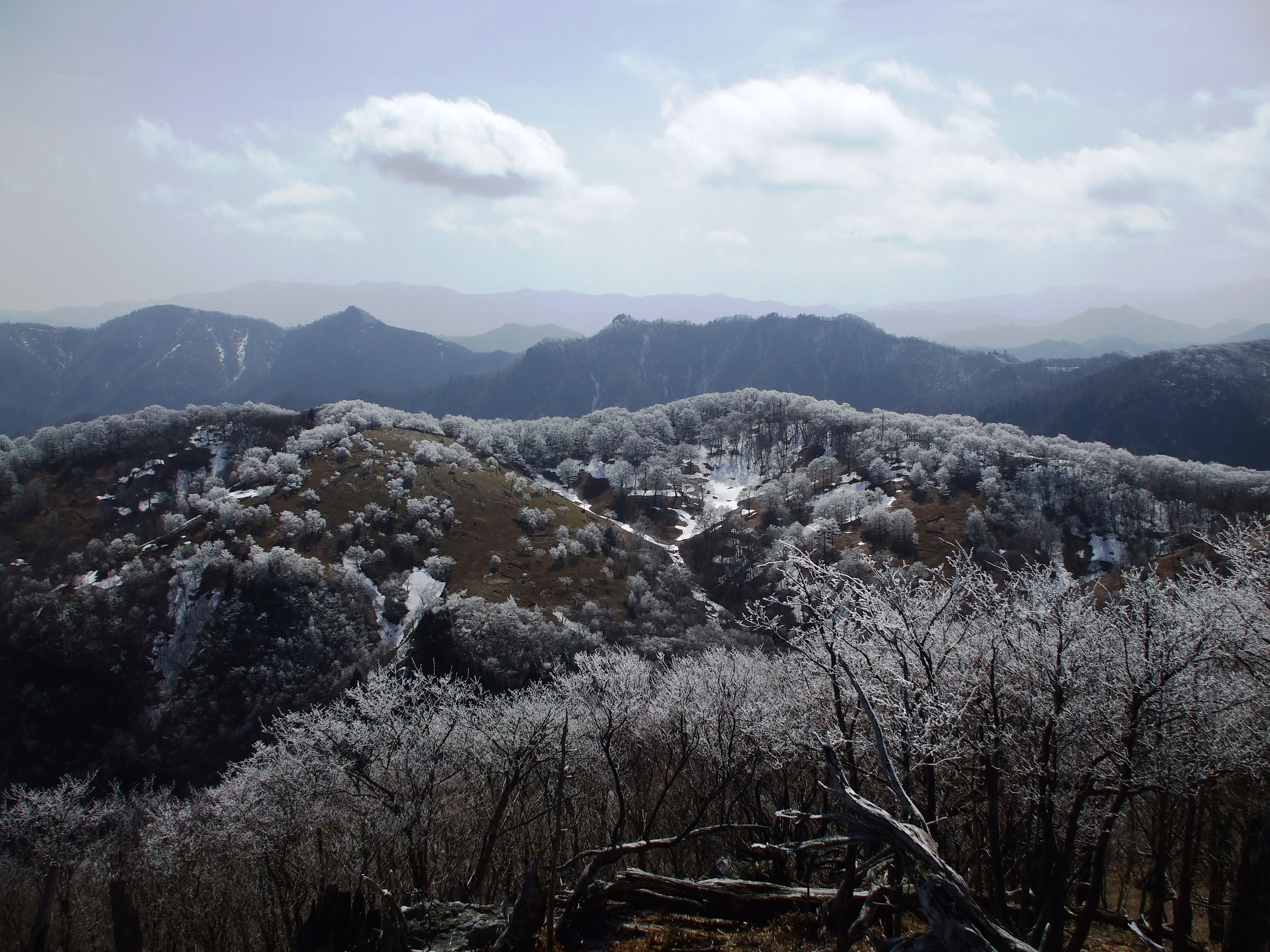
Trees with frosts from the top of Mount Hinokizuka Okumine (03/2009)

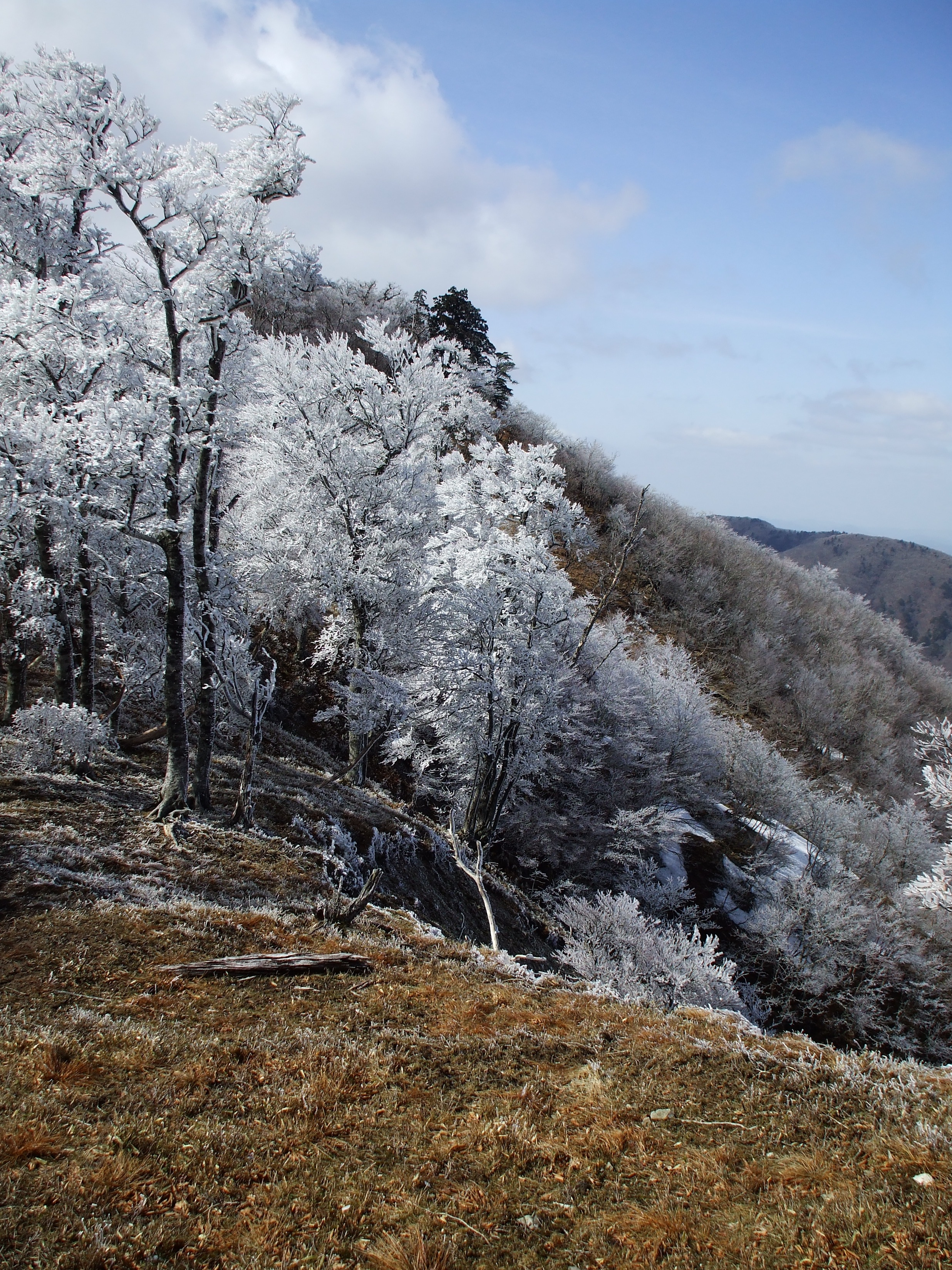
Trees with frosts at the top of Mount Hinokizuka Okumine (03/2009)
