= Anbō, Yakushima =

Anbō 安房
- Neighbourhood
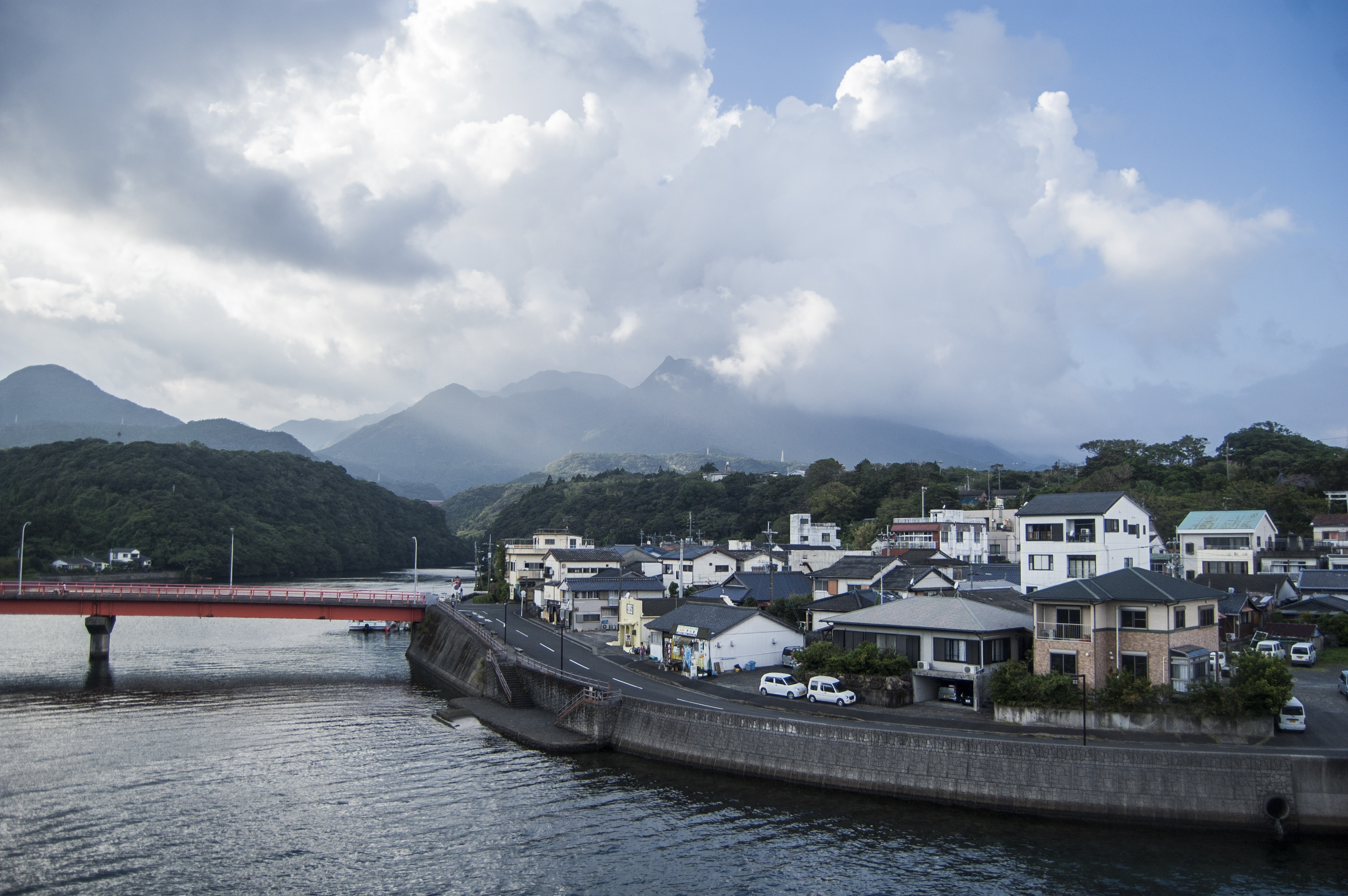
- Red Bridge across the Anbō River

- Location in Japan
- Coordinates: 30°18′54″N 130°39′14.4″E
- Country: Japan
- Region: Kyushu (Ōsumi)
- Prefecture: Kagoshima Prefecture
- District: Kumage
- Town (municipality): Yakushima
- First official recorded: ?
- Kamiyaku town settled: April 1, 1958

Population (2008)
  - Total: 8,000
- Time zone: UTC+09:00 (JST)

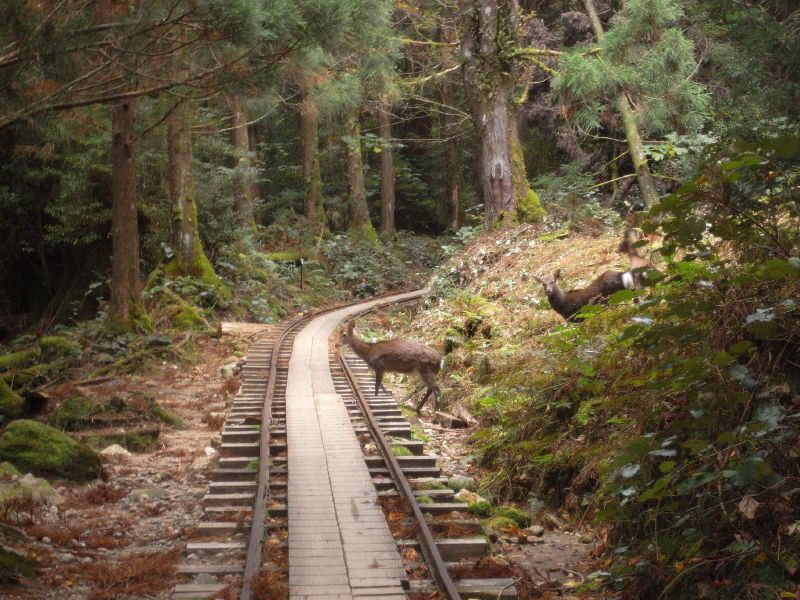
A view of Anbō Forest Railway

Anbō (安房), also spelled Ambō, is a port town and the major settlement of the island of Yakushima, in Japan. It is part of the municipality (with town status) of Yakushima, Kagoshima Prefecture.

== History ==
Originally part of the municipality of Kamiyaku, on October 1, 2007, it merged the municipality of Yaku (including Miyanoura) to create the current municipality of Yakushima.

== Geography ==
Anbō is a coastal town on the Pacific Ocean, east of the island of Yakushima, below the mountains and crossed in the middle by Anbō River. It is 19 km southeast of the town of Miyanoura, and 13 km northeast of the village of Hiranai. A 13 km mountain road links it to the touristic natural areas Arakawa Waterfalls and Yakusugi Land.

== Transport ==
The port of Anbō has passenger services to Kuchinoerabu, Nishinoomote (on Tanegashima island), Miyanoura and Kagoshima. The town is crossed by the main island road and is served by a bus network. Nearest airport is Yakushima Airport, located 8,5 km north.

=== Anbō Forest Railway ===
Anbō Forest Railway (安房森林軌道), also known as Yakushima Forest Railway, is one of the last forest railways still operating in Japan. It has a length of 11.2 km, plus a branch of 7.1 km. The railway has a gauge of 762 mm (2 ft 6 in) and starts north of Anbō town, reaching the Arakawa Waterfalls, the ghost village of Kosugidani, and a forest area below Mount Miyanoura and close to the Jōmon Sugi tree. Some sections of the railway tracks are used as hiking trails. However, a section of the route is not open to the public. Since 2013, attempts have been made to use a section of the route as a tourist railway.

== See also ==
- Jōmon Sugi
- Mount Miyanoura

== See also ==
Media related to Anbō at Wikimedia Commons
