= Yakushima National Park =

National park in Kyushu, Japan

- 霧島屋久国立公園
- IUCN category II (national park)
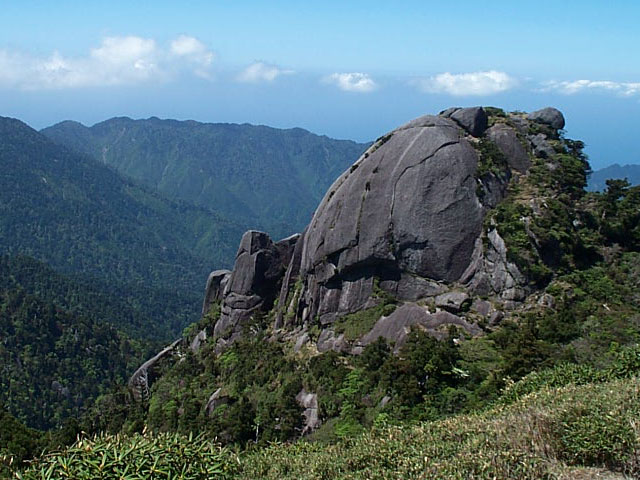
- View of the Bōzuiwa in the national park

- Location within Kagoshima Prefecture Location within Japan
- Location: Yakushima island, Kagoshima Prefecture, Kyushu, Japan
- Coordinates: 30.33°N 130.53°E
- Area: 325.53 km^{2} (125.69 sq mi)
- Established: 16 March 2012
- Governing body: Ministry of the Environment (Japan)

Yakushima National Park (屋久島国立公園, Yakushima Kokuritsu Kōen) is a protected area located in Kagoshima Prefecture, Kyushu. It includes parts of the Ōsumi Islands with Yakushima, the entire island Kuchinoerabu-jima and some surrounding marine areas. The total size is 325.53 square kilometres (125.69 sq mi).

The national park was established on March 16, 1964 and assigned to the Kirishima National Park, which became Kirishima-Yaku National Park. On March 16, 2012 Yakushima was split of as the separate Yakushima National Park. Kirishima-Yaku National Park was renamed to Kirishima-Kinkōwan National Park with an area of 365.86 km².

== Geography ==
The National Park covers over 20,989 hectares (51,860 acres) on Yakushima. This is 42% of the island's land area and 3,943.4 hectares (9,744 acres) of adjacent marine area. It is mainly on the west coast of the island. Kuchinoerabu-jima has 3,577 hectares (8,840 acres) and belongs entirely to the National Park plus 4,043.5 hectares (9,992 acres) of coastal waters. The national park thus covers 24,566 hectares (60,700 acres) and 7,986.9 hectares (19,736 acres) of sea.

The core area of the National Park is formed by the Okudake mountains. The highest point is Mount Miyanoura with a height of 1,936 metres (6,352 ft). Some of the mountains are considered sacred places by the population, others can be climbed. Parts of the area are accessible by hiking trails. The island has a humid subtropical climate zone with humid and hot summers and mild winters. Depending on the location, the precipitation is between 4,000 and 8,000 millimetres (160 and 310 in) per year.

=== Yakushima ===
- Ōkawa Falls
- Oku-dake
- Mae-dake
- Nagata-hama
- Jōmon Sugi
- Kuchinoerabu-jima
- Mount Miyanoura

== Nature and landscape ==
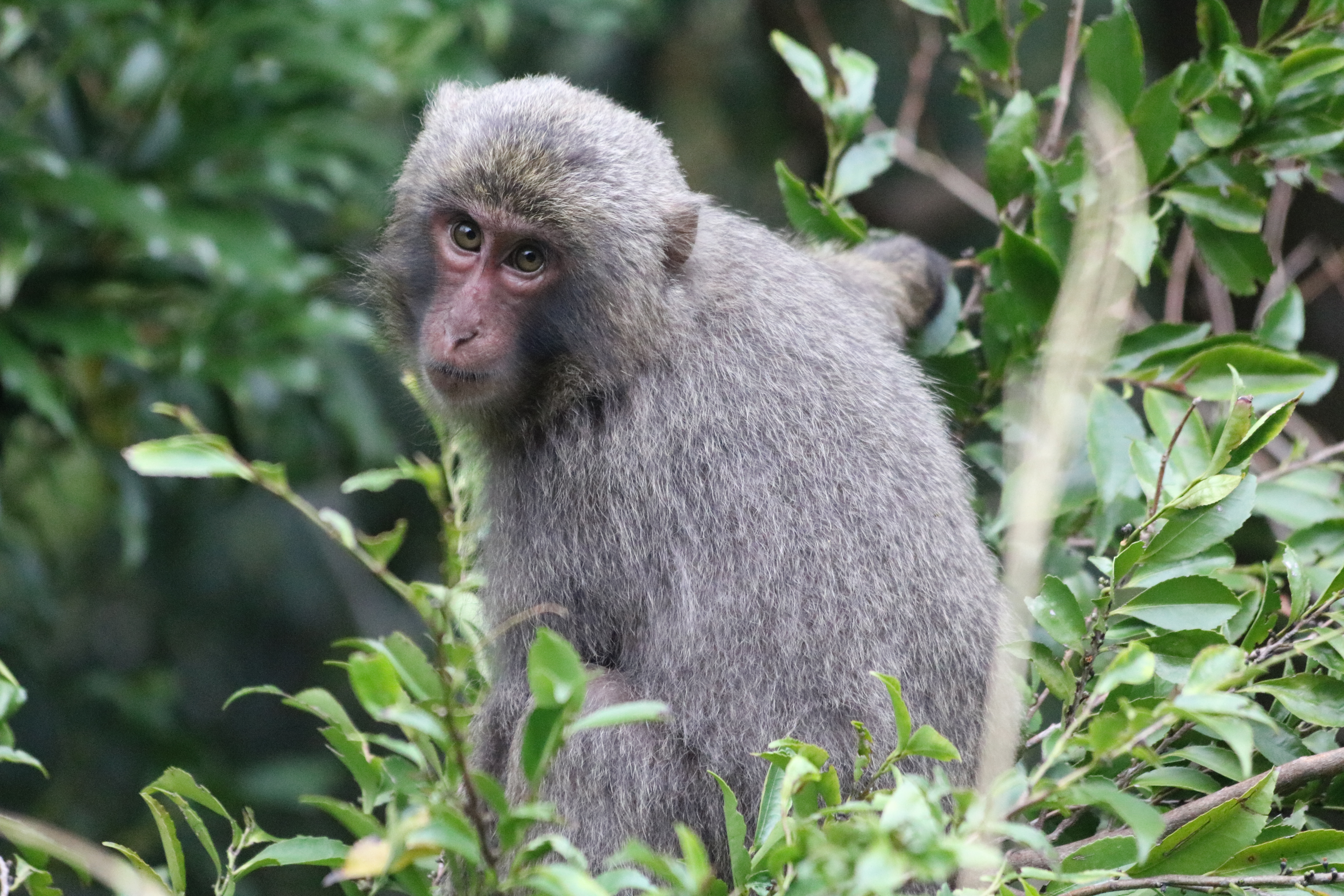
Japanese macaque (Macaca fuscata)

In the national park are extensive stocks of cryptomeria and rhododendron. A 1,219-hectare (3,010-acre) area with the oldest cedar trees, Yakusugi, whose age is estimated to be more than 2000 years, is not part of the national park. On 17 May 1975, the Hanayama district in the Yakushima mountains was designated as the Yakushima Wilderness Area (屋久島原生自然環境保全地域) under special protection.

Parts of the national park, as well as the Yakushima Natural Reserve (107.47 km²), were declared by UNESCO World Heritage in 1993.

The national park has its own subspecies of the Japanese macaque (Macaca fuscata). The beach of Nagata-hama is visited by Hawksbill sea turtles to lay eggs.

At the southwestern end of the island is the Kurio Marine Park. It has coral reefs and correspondingly exotic wildlife. The landscape of the island Kuchinoerabu-jima is characterized by different volcanoes and dense forests. The endangered species of Ryukyu flying fox lives there.

Altogether, 1900 plant species, 16 mammal species and 150 bird species have been detected in the National Park thus far.
