= List of ultra-prominent peaks of Japan =

This is a list of all the ultra-prominent peaks (with topographic prominence greater than 1,500 metres) in Japan.

Ultra-prominent peaks in Japan
Mount Fuji

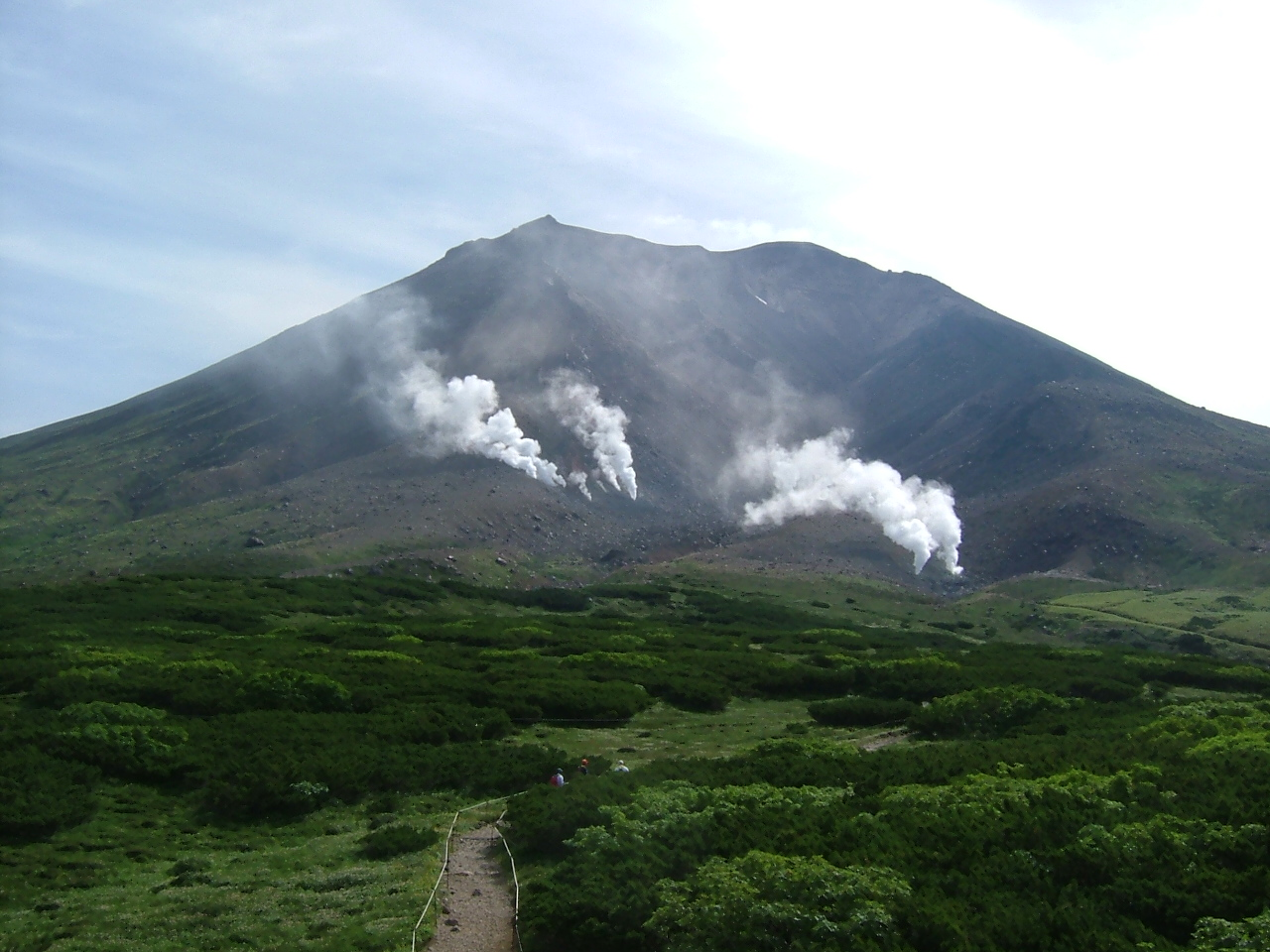
Asahidake

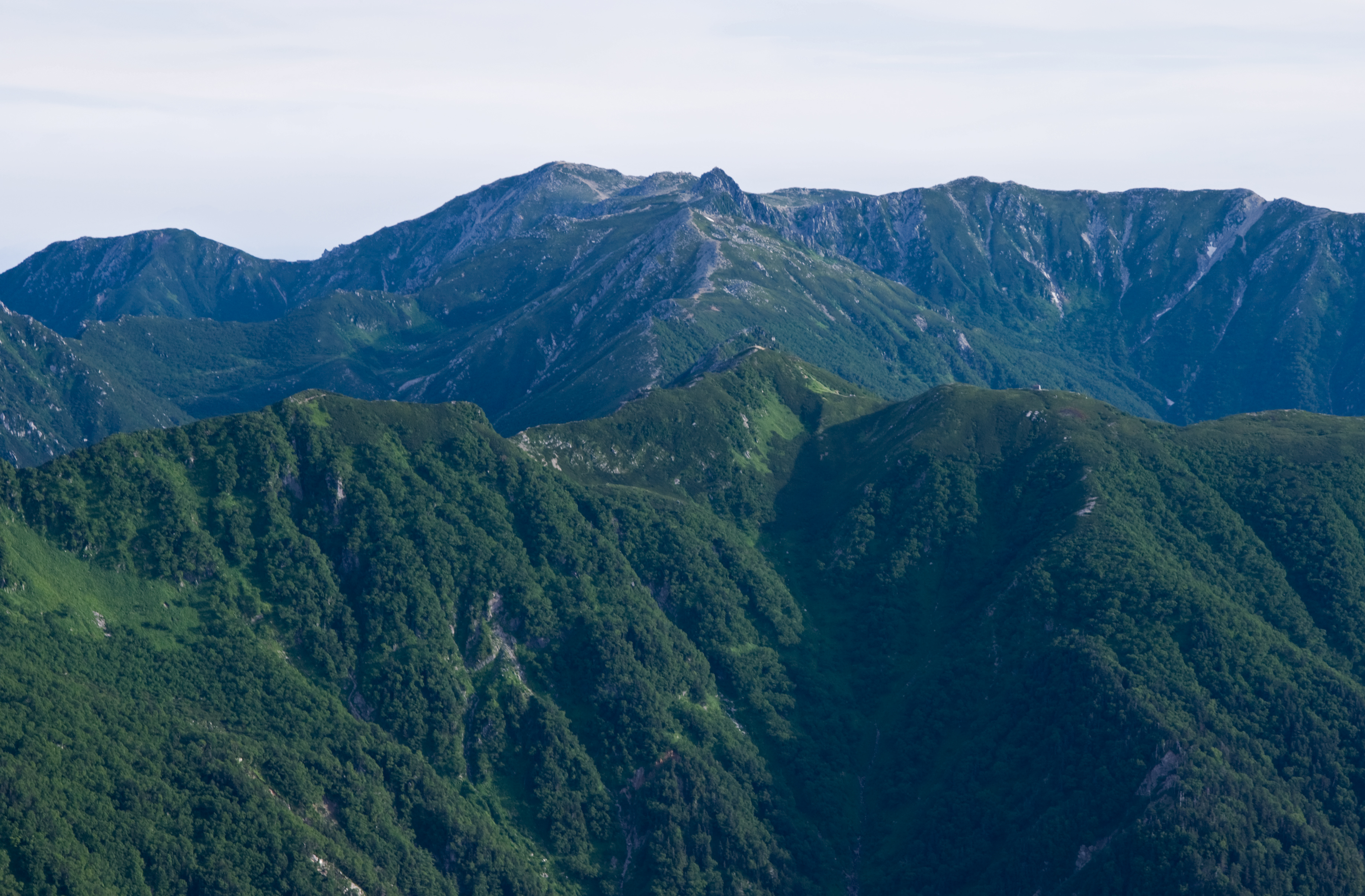
Mount Kisokoma

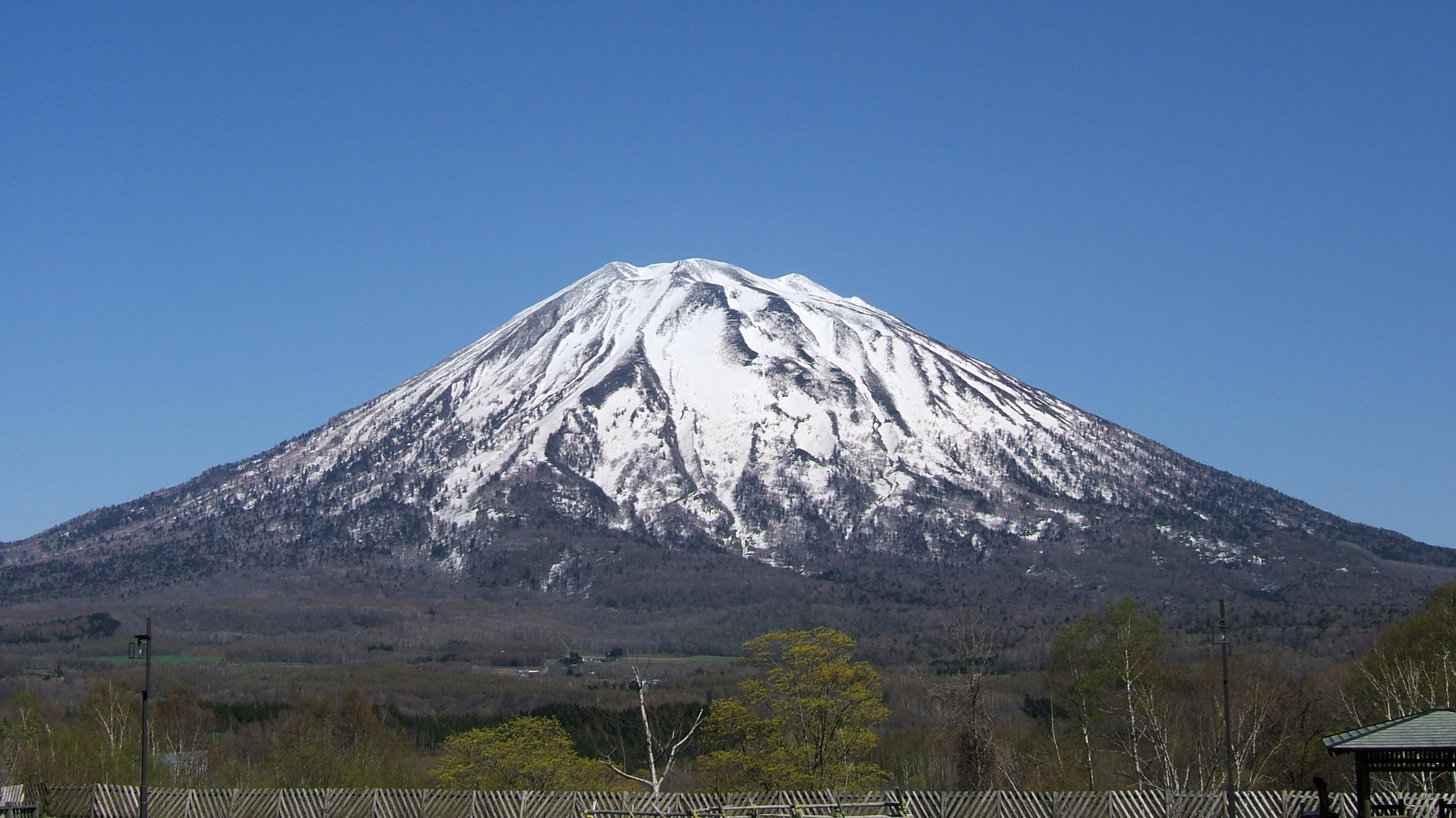
Mount Yōtei

No	Peak	Island	Elevation (m)	Prominence (m)	Col (m)
1	Mount Fuji	Honshū	3,776	3,776	0
2	Mount Hotaka	Honshū	3,190	2,307	883
3	Asahidake	Hokkaidō	2,290	2,290	0
4	Mount Kita	Honshū	3,192	2,239	953
5	Mount Ishizuchi	Shikoku	1,982	1,982	0
6	Mount Miyanoura	Yakushima	1,936	1,936	0
7	Mount Aka	Honshū	2,899	1,916	883
8	Mount Haku	Honshū	2,702	1,897	805
9	Mount Chōkai	Honshū	2,236	1,891	345
10	Mount Yōtei	Hokkaidō	1,898	1,878	20
11	Mount Kujū	Kyūshū	1,791	1,791	0
12	Mount Kisokoma	Honshū	2,956	1,751	1205
13	Mount Iwate	Honshū	2,038	1,745	293
14	Mount Hakkyō	Honshū	1,915	1,732	183
15	Mount Rishiri	Rishiri Island	1,721	1,721	0
16	Mount Ontake	Honshū	3,067	1,712	1355
17	Mount Hiuchi	Honshū	2,462	1,637	825
18	Daisen	Honshū	1,729	1,634	95
19	Mount Nikkō-Shirane	Honshū	2,578	1,613	965
20	Mount Dainichi	Honshū	2,128	1,593	535
21	Mount Tsurugi	Shikoku	1,955	1,540	415

== See also ==
- List of mountains in Japan

== Sources ==
- List
- Map
