= Typhoon Ruth (1951) =

Pacific typhoon in 1951

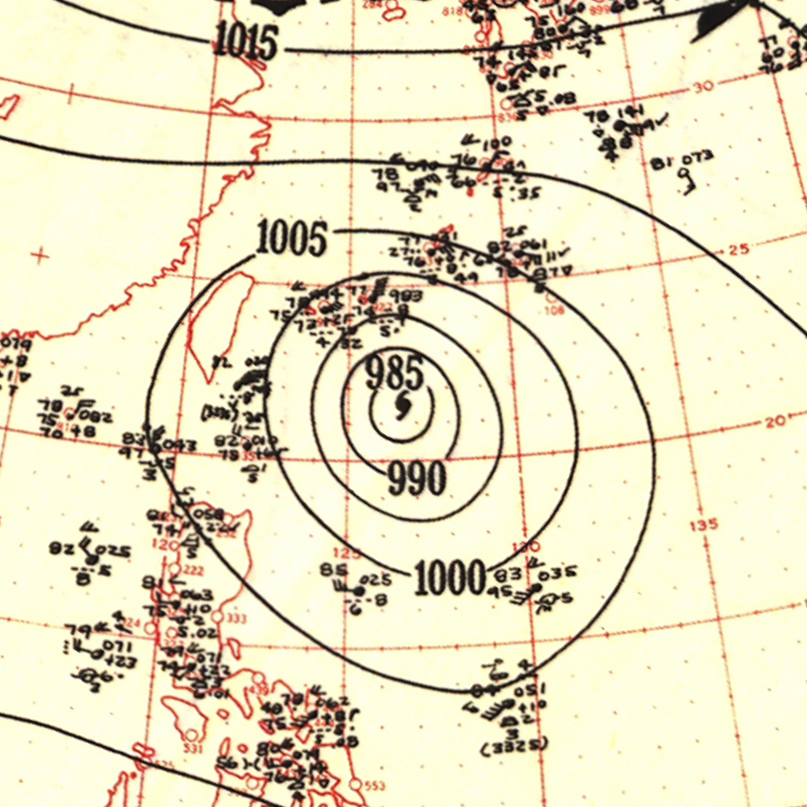
- Analysis of Typhoon Ruth on October 12

Meteorological history
- Formed: October 8, 1951
- Dissipated: October 15, 1951

Category 4-equivalent typhoon
- 1-minute sustained (SSHWS/JTWC)
- Highest winds: 220 km/h (140 mph)
- Lowest pressure: 924 hPa (mbar); 27.29 inHg

Overall effects
- Fatalities: 572
- Injuries: 2,644
- Missing: 371
- Areas affected: Guam, Northern Mariana Islands, Yap, Japan
- IBTrACS
- Part of the 1951 Pacific typhoon season

Typhoon Ruth was a large, Category 4 equivalent typhoon that hit Japan in October 1951.

== Meteorological history ==
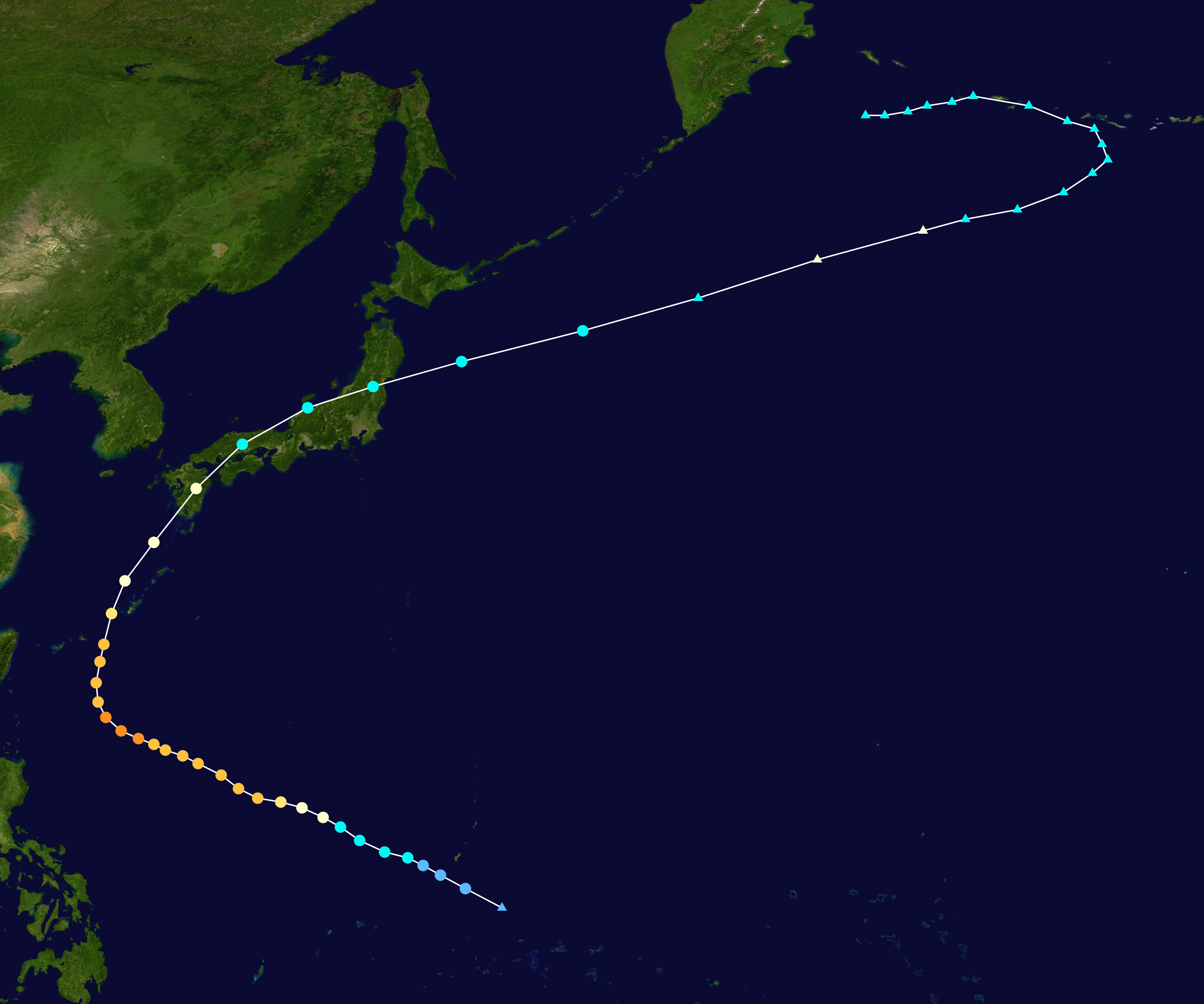
Map plotting the storm's track and intensity, according to the Saffir–Simpson scale Map key Saffir–Simpson scale Tropical depression (≤38 mph, ≤62 km/h) Tropical storm (39–73 mph, 63–118 km/h) Category 1 (74–95 mph, 119–153 km/h) Category 2 (96–110 mph, 154–177 km/h) Category 3 (111–129 mph, 178–208 km/h) Category 4 (130–156 mph, 209–251 km/h) Category 5 (≥157 mph, ≥252 km/h) Unknown Storm type Tropical cyclone Subtropical cyclone Extratropical cyclone, remnant low, tropical disturbance, or monsoon depression

== Preparations ==
On early October 13th, Storm warnings were issued for southern Japan to alert the surrounding areas of the imminent typhoon. Planes in Tokyo were grounded and courier service to Korea was suspended. Ships in harbours were also stationed.

== Impact ==
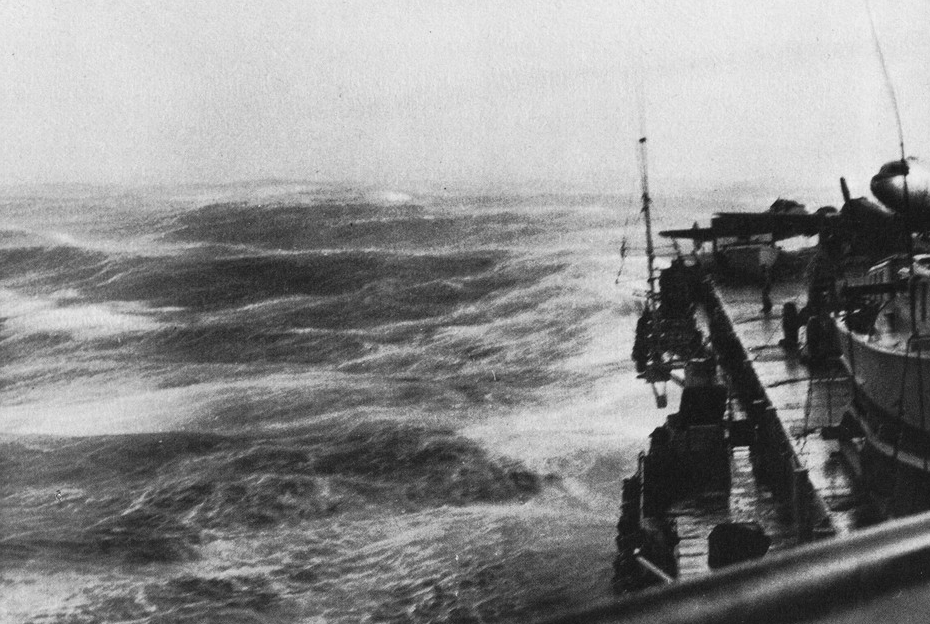
USS Badoeng Strait in Typhoon Ruth

Ruth impacted Japan between October 13–15, killing 572 people and injuring another 2,644; 371 people were left unaccounted for. Many of these deaths arose from river flooding triggered by Ruth. The storm damaged 221,118 homes and 9,596 ships, as well as some 3.5 million bushels of rice. Due to Ruth's large size, much of the country was affected by the typhoon's winds and rains. A peak wind gust of 195 km/h (121 mph) and a rainfall total of 639.3 mm (25.17 in) was recorded at Kamiyaku, Kagoshima; both of these values were the highest recorded in Japan from Ruth. Yamaguchi Prefecture was most severely impacted by the typhoon. Coastal areas were inundated and communications were disrupted. Winds reaching 150 km/h (95 mph) and waves 13.5 m (44 ft) high struck Sasebo, Nagasaki, sinking ships and damaging others in the harbor; among them were warships deployed for the Korean War. American military installations throughout Japan incurred over US$1 million in damage. Overall property damage in Japan was estimated at US$25 million, affecting an estimated 123,773 people; total damage to property, crops, and forests reached US$55 million.

== See also ==
- 1951 Pacific typhoon season
