= Catocala tokui =

Scientific classification
- Kingdom: Animalia
- Phylum: Arthropoda
- Clade: Pancrustacea
- Class: Insecta
- Order: Lepidoptera
- Superfamily: Noctuoidea
- Family: Erebidae
- Genus: Catocala
- Species: C. tokui

Binomial name
- Catocala tokui Sugi, 1976

Species of moth

Catocala tokui is a moth of the family Erebidae, that was first described in 1976 by Shigero Sugi. It is found in Japan (Honshu, Kyushu, Tsushima, Yakushima) and Taiwan.

The wingspan is about 47 mm.
