= Naoshima Pavilion =

Installation on Naoshima, Japan

- 直島パヴィリオン
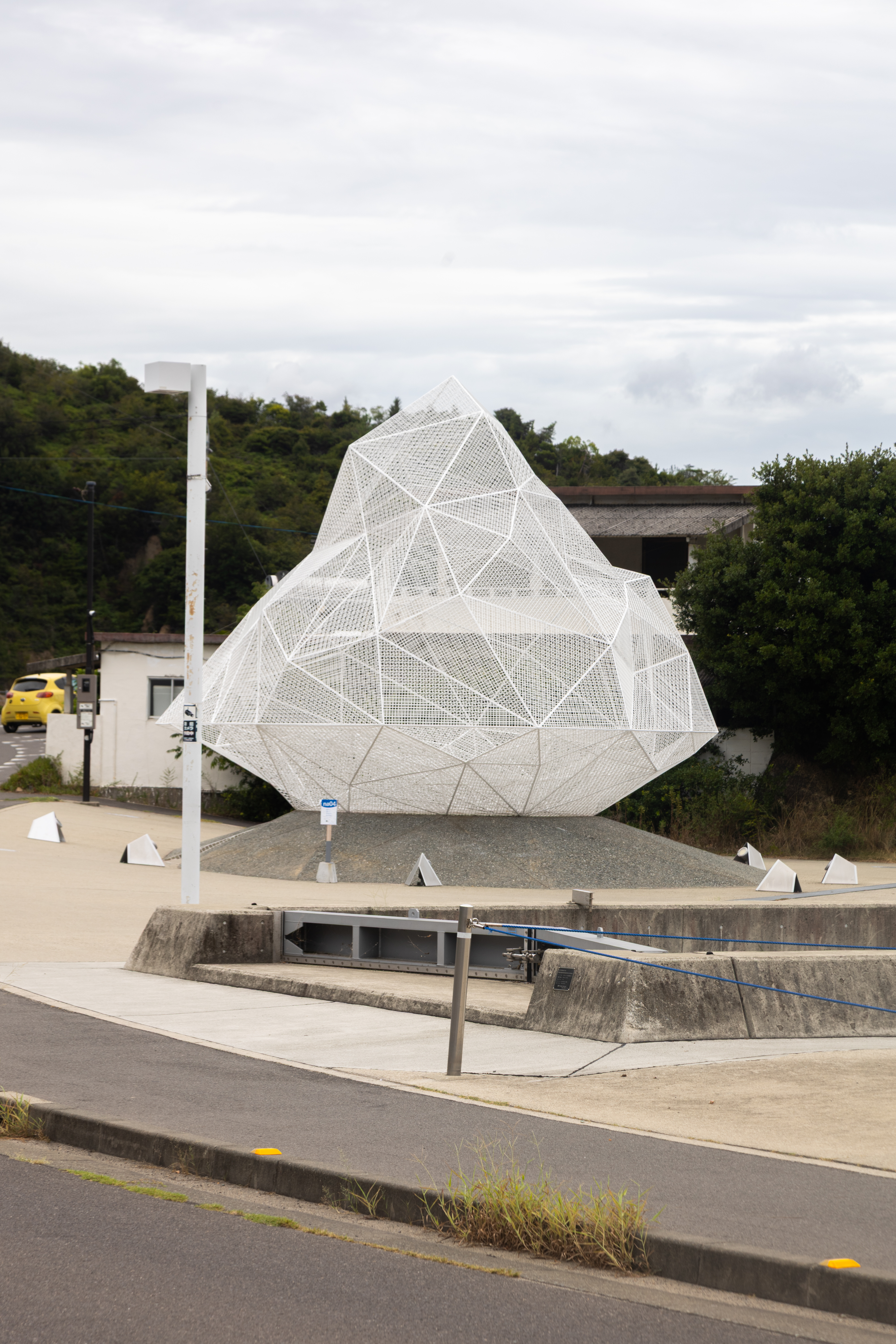
- The Naoshima Pavilion in 2025
- Interactive map of the Naoshima Pavilion area

General information
- Location: Naoshima, Kagawa, Japan
- Coordinates: 34.45597471842972°N 133.97541569619335°E
- Opened: 2015

Design and construction
- Architect: Sou Fujimoto

The Naoshima Pavilion (直島パヴィリオン) is a 2015 installation on the coast of Naoshima, in Japan, designed by Japanese architect Sou Fujimoto. Made of a white metal mesh material in an irregular polyhedron shape, it was constructed for and unveiled ahead of the 2016 Setouchi Triennale. The installation stands at seven meters tall and is located near Miyanoura's port.

== History ==
Fujimoto created the space as a public accommodation where residents and tourists alike can relax and come together. In anticipation of the Setouchi Triennale for 2016, it was installed near Miyanoura's port, intended as a landmark to welcome those arriving to the island via ferry. Its opening, in 2015, was filmed by French architect and filmmaker Vincent Hecht.

In 2016, Akris' creative director Albert Kriemler designed an SS16 womenswear collection based on the architecture of Fujimoto, which included an inspiring visit to the Naoshima Pavilion that then spurred Kriemler to meet with him.
