= Miyanoura =

Miyanoura 宮之浦
- Neighbourhood
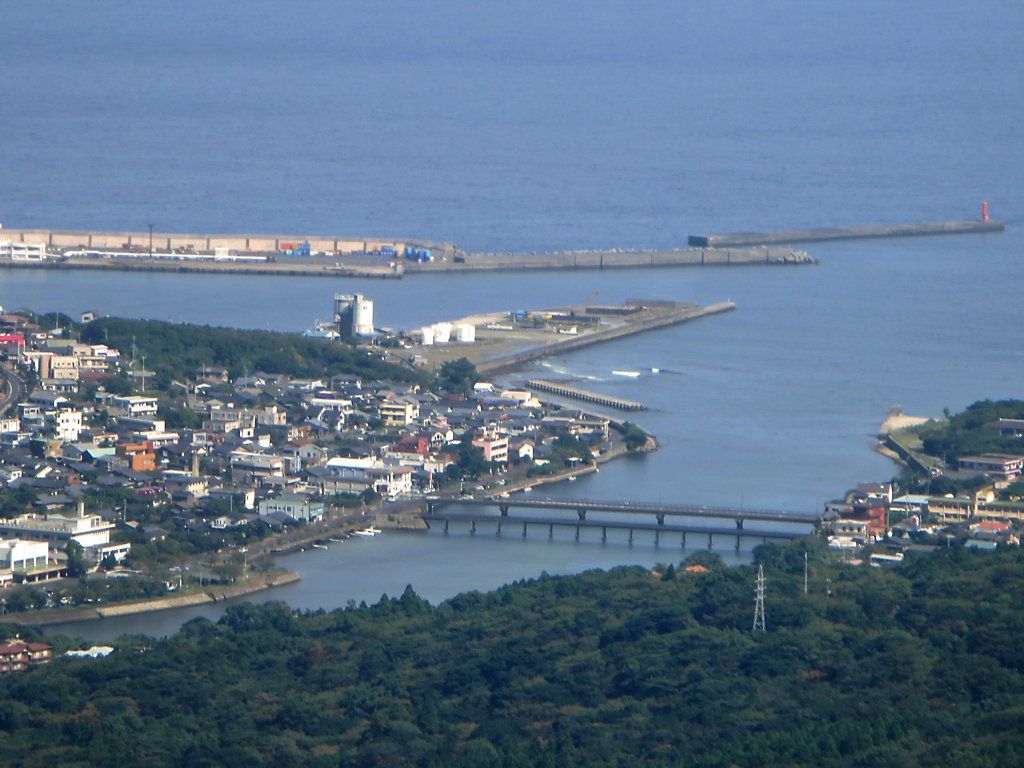
- The port of Miyanoura

- Location in Japan
- Coordinates: 30°25′37″N 130°34′17″E
- Country: Japan
- Region: Kyushu (Ōsumi)
- Prefecture: Kagoshima Prefecture
- District: Kumage
- Town (municipality): Yakushima
- First official recorded: ?
- Yaku town settled: April 1, 1959

Population (2017)
  - Total: 6,544
- Time zone: UTC+09:00 (JST)

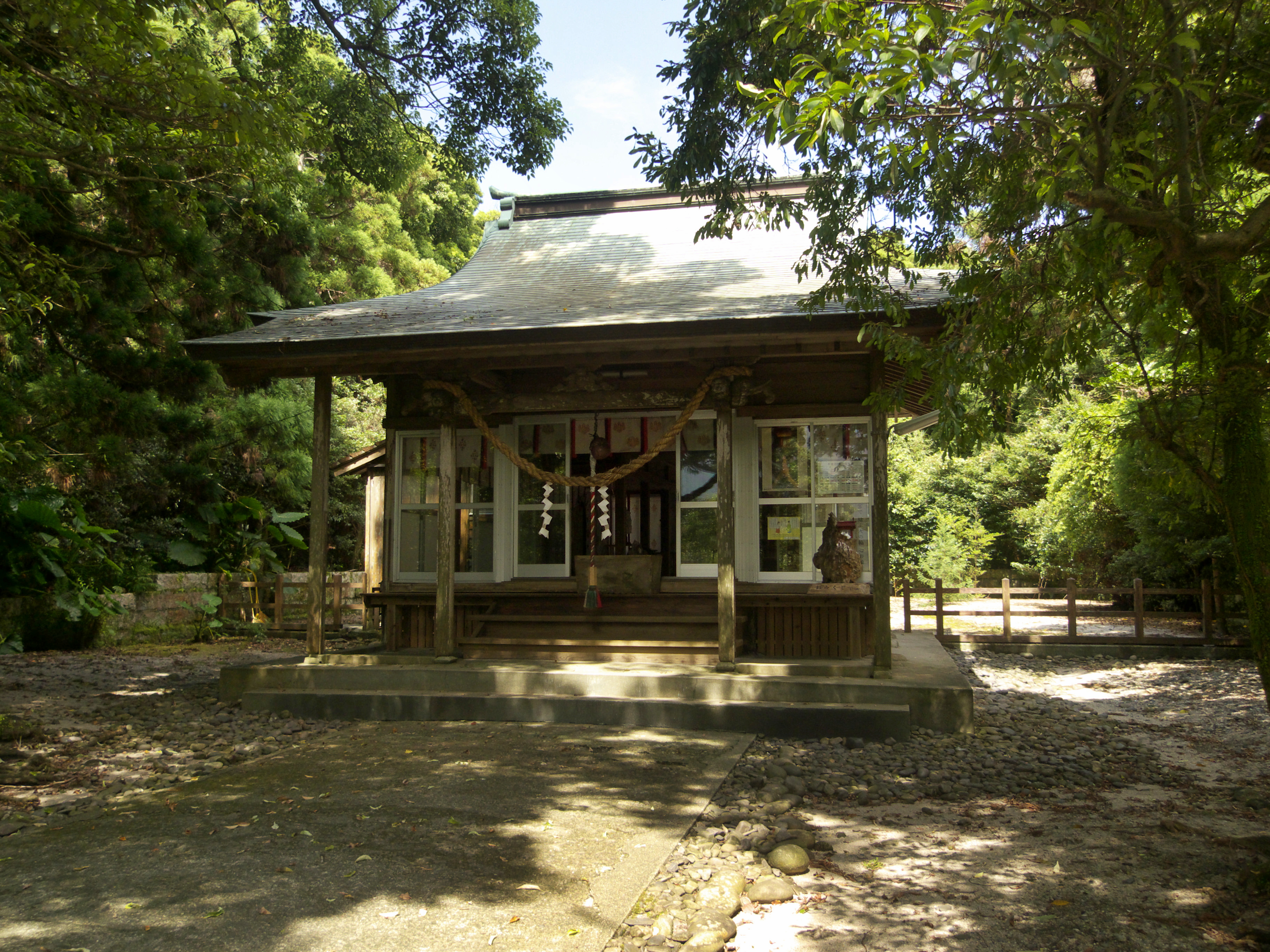
Yakujinja Shrine

Miyanoura (宮之浦) is a port town and the second major settlement of the island of Yakushima, in Japan. It is part of the municipality (with town status) of Yakushima, Kagoshima Prefecture.

== History ==
Originally part of the municipality of Yaku, on October 1, 2007, it merged the municipality of Kamiyaku (including Anbō) to create the current municipality of Yakushima.

== Geography ==
Miyanoura is a coastal town on the Pacific Ocean, north of the island of Yakushima, below the Mount Miyanoura and crossed in the middle by Miyanoura River. It is 19 km northwest of the town of Anbō, and 9 km east of the village of Nakata. A 10 km mountain road links it to the touristic gorges of Shiratani Unsui.

== Transport ==
The port of Miyanoura has passenger services to Nishinoomote, Minamitane (both on Tanegashima island), Anbō, Kuchinoerabu and Kagoshima. The town is crossd by the main island road and is served by a bus network. Nearest airport is Yakushima Airport, located 10 km east.

== See also ==
- Jōmon Sugi
- Anbō Forest Railway

== See also ==
Media related to Miyanoura at Wikimedia Commons
