= Yakushima, Kagoshima =

Yakushima 屋久島町
- Town
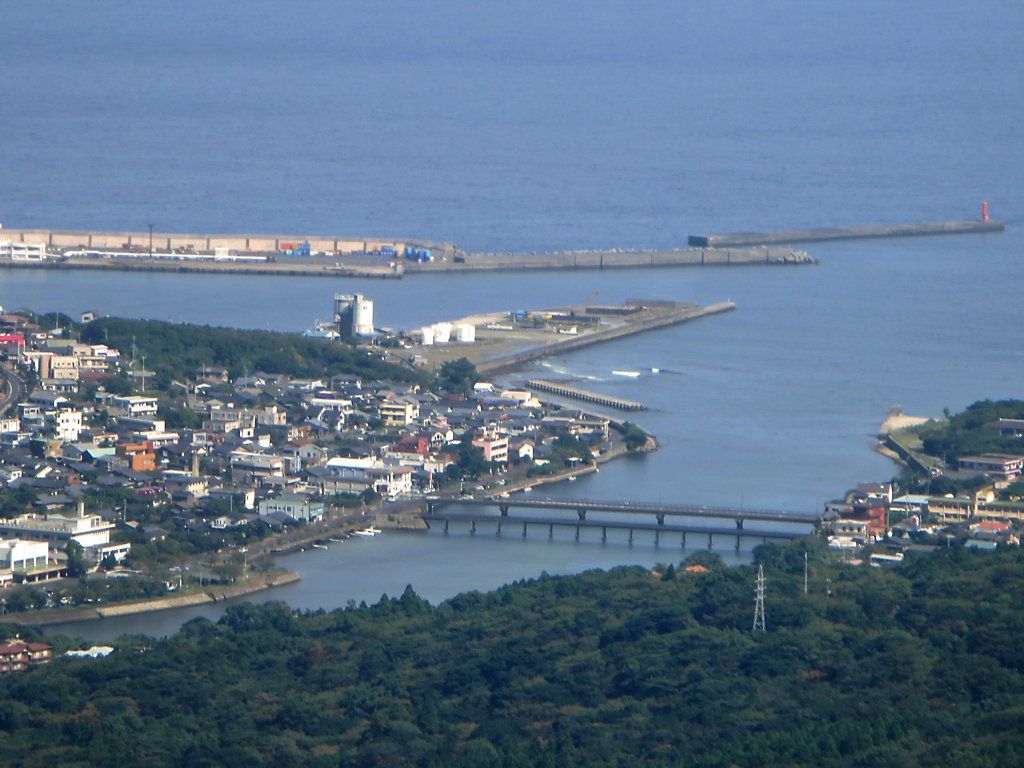
- View of Miyanoura and Yaku wetland area

- Flag Emblem

- Location of Yakushima in Kagoshima Prefecture

- Location in Japan
- Coordinates: 30°23′24″N 130°39′4″E
- Country: Japan
- Region: Kyushu (Ōsumi)
- Prefecture: Kagoshima Prefecture
- District: Kumage
- First official recorded: 607 AD
- Kami-yaku town settled: April 1, 1958
- Yaku town settled: April 1, 1959
- Merged with two towns and current town name changed: October 1, 2007

Government
  - Mayor: Tonao Hidaka

Area
  - Total: 540.98 km^{2} (208.87 sq mi)

Population (January 2008)
  - Total: 13,486
  - Density: 24.9/km^{2} (64/sq mi)
- Time zone: UTC+09:00 (JST)
- City hall address: 469-45 Koseda, Yakushima-chō, Kumage-gun, Kagoshima-ken; 891-4207
- Website: www.town.yakushima.kagoshima.jp
- Symbols
- Bird: Yaku komadori (Erithacus akahige tanensis Kuroda)
- Flower: Yakushima shakunage (Rhododendron metternichii Sieb. et Zucc. var. yakushimanum (Nakai) Ohwi)
- Tree: Yakusugi

Yakushima (屋久島町, Yakushima-chō) is a town located in Kumage District, Kagoshima, Japan. The town is on the island of Yakushima and Kuchinoerabujima.

== History ==
On October 1, 2007, the town was formed by the merger of the towns of Kamiyaku and Yaku, both from Kumage District.

== Geography ==
Major settlements of the island are the port towns of Anbō and Miyanoura. Other settlements are the coastal villages of Hiranai, Kuriobashi, Nagata, Okonotaki and the abandoned forest village of Kosugidani. Among the localities, there are the gorges of Shiratani Unsui, Arakawa, Yakushima Airport, Kigensugi and Yakusugi.

== Demographics ==
As of 2008, the town has an estimated population of 13,486 and the density of 24.9 persons per km^{2}. The total area is 540.98 km^{2}.

== Transport ==
Yakushima Airport serves Yakushima. There are also hydrofoils and ferries serving the island. Kuchinoerabujima is accessible by a municipal ferry. Inside the island there is a forest railway, the Anbō Forest Railway.

== Education ==
High schools

- Kagoshima Prefectural Yakushima High School
- Yakushima Ōzora High School (correspondence course high school)

Junior high schools

- Anbō Junior High School
- Gakunan Junior High School
- Issō Junior High School
- Kanadake Junior High School
- Koseda Junior High School
- Miyaura Junior High School
- Nagata Junior High School

Elementary schools

- Anbō Elementary School
- Hachiman Elementary School
- Issō Elementary School
- Kamiyama Elementary School
- Kanadake Elementary School
- Koseda Elementary School
- Kurio Elementary School
- Miyaura Elementary School
- Nagata Elementary School

== Climate ==
Climate data for Yakushima (1991−2020 normals, extremes 1937−present)
Month	Jan	Feb	Mar	Apr	May	Jun	Jul	Aug	Sep	Oct	Nov	Dec	Year
Record high °C (°F)	25.3 (77.5)	26.1 (79.0)	29.6 (85.3)	29.8 (85.6)	31.9 (89.4)	34.8 (94.6)	35.2 (95.4)	36.0 (96.8)	34.7 (94.5)	31.3 (88.3)	30.7 (87.3)	26.6 (79.9)	36.0 (96.8)
Mean daily maximum °C (°F)	14.7 (58.5)	15.5 (59.9)	18.0 (64.4)	21.4 (70.5)	24.5 (76.1)	26.9 (80.4)	30.5 (86.9)	30.9 (87.6)	28.9 (84.0)	25.2 (77.4)	21.2 (70.2)	16.8 (62.2)	22.9 (73.2)
Daily mean °C (°F)	11.8 (53.2)	12.3 (54.1)	14.6 (58.3)	17.8 (64.0)	21.0 (69.8)	23.7 (74.7)	27.0 (80.6)	27.5 (81.5)	25.7 (78.3)	22.2 (72.0)	18.2 (64.8)	13.9 (57.0)	19.6 (67.3)
Mean daily minimum °C (°F)	8.9 (48.0)	9.2 (48.6)	11.3 (52.3)	14.2 (57.6)	17.5 (63.5)	21.0 (69.8)	23.9 (75.0)	24.6 (76.3)	22.8 (73.0)	19.4 (66.9)	15.2 (59.4)	11.0 (51.8)	16.6 (61.9)
Record low °C (°F)	1.0 (33.8)	0.7 (33.3)	1.5 (34.7)	4.5 (40.1)	10.1 (50.2)	13.7 (56.7)	18.3 (64.9)	19.6 (67.3)	15.2 (59.4)	9.1 (48.4)	5.6 (42.1)	2.2 (36.0)	0.7 (33.3)
Average precipitation mm (inches)	294.6 (11.60)	289.2 (11.39)	387.0 (15.24)	405.5 (15.96)	444.1 (17.48)	860.3 (33.87)	362.4 (14.27)	256.5 (10.10)	450.7 (17.74)	309.9 (12.20)	309.6 (12.19)	281.8 (11.09)	4,651.7 (183.14)
Average snowfall cm (inches)	0 (0)	0 (0)	0 (0)	0 (0)	0 (0)	0 (0)	0 (0)	0 (0)	0 (0)	0 (0)	0 (0)	0 (0)	0 (0)
Average precipitation days (≥ 0.5 mm)	17.2	15.2	16.2	13.5	13.7	19.6	12.5	14.6	15.5	12.8	12.8	15.8	179.3
Average relative humidity (%)	68	68	69	71	76	85	83	82	81	74	71	69	75
Mean monthly sunshine hours	74.9	83.2	117.9	146.2	152.7	100.0	209.9	201.3	139.8	115.9	97.3	78.8	1,515.8
Source: Japan Meteorological Agency

== Image ==
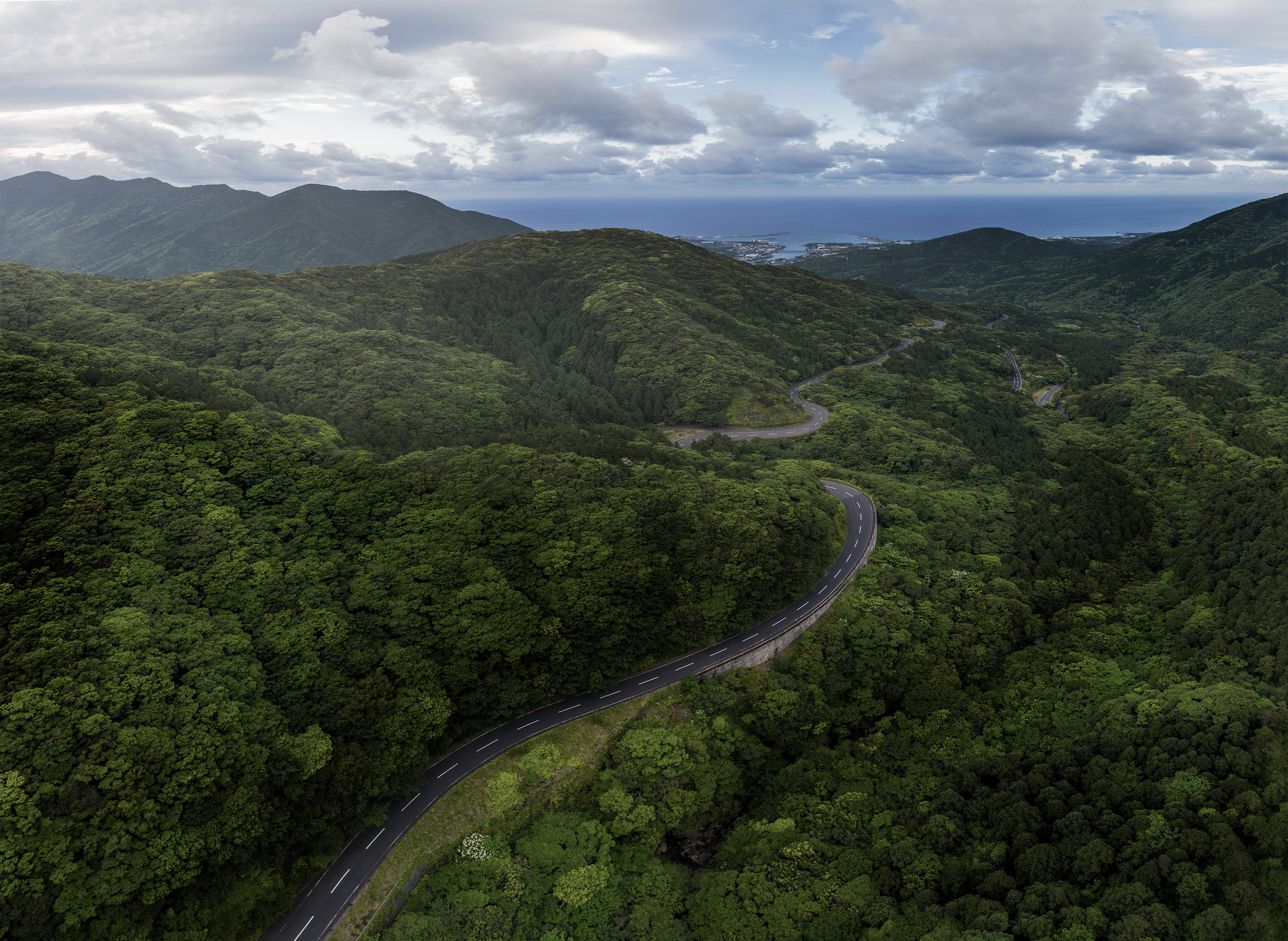
Forest of Yakushima

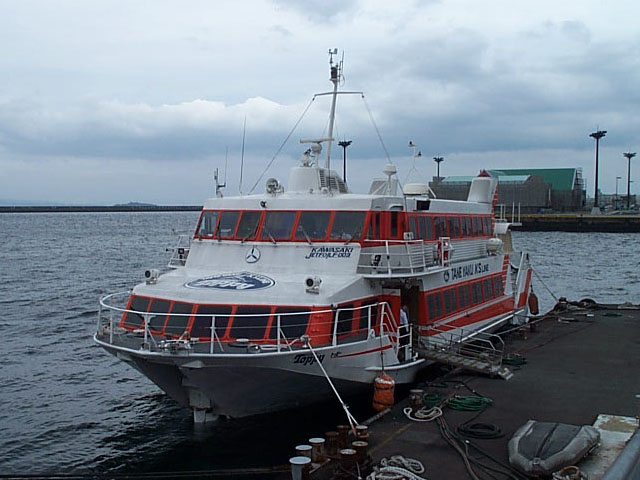
Hydrofoil serving the island
