= Yaku, Kagoshima =

Dissolved municipality in Kagoshima prefecture, Japan

Coordinates: 30°16′48″N 130°34′38″E

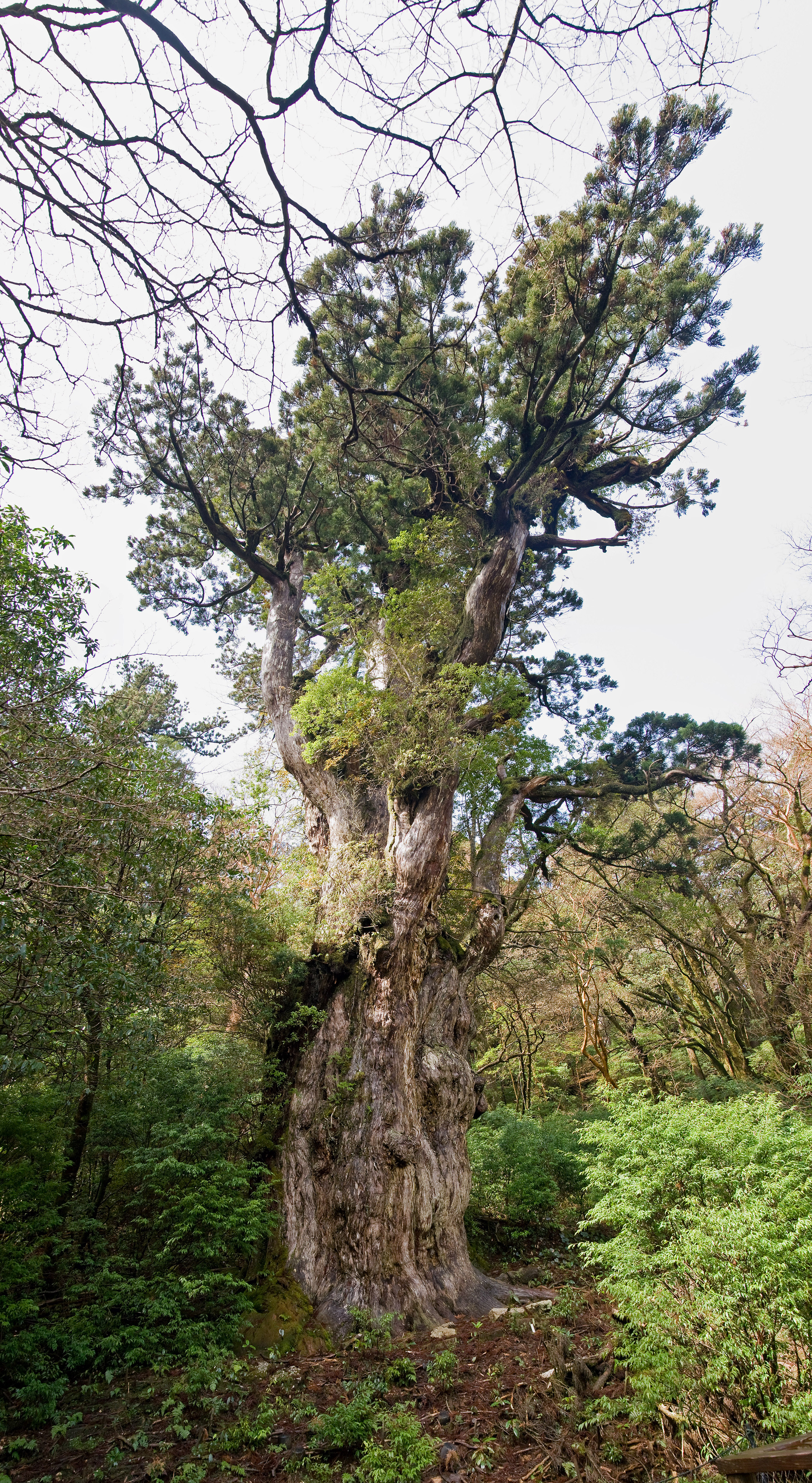
Jōmon Sugi in Yaku Island Japan

Yaku (屋久町, Yaku-chō) was a town located on the southern half of Yakushima (Yaku Island) in Kumage District, Kagoshima Prefecture, Japan. Its major settlement is the port town of Miyanoura.

== History ==
As of 2003, the town had an estimated population of 7,008 and a population density of 28.96 persons per km^{2}. The total area was 242.03 km^{2}.

On October 1, 2007, Yaku, along with the town of Kamiyaku (also from Kumage District), was merged to create the town of Yakushima.
