= Yakushima Airport =

Yakushima Airport 屋久島空港
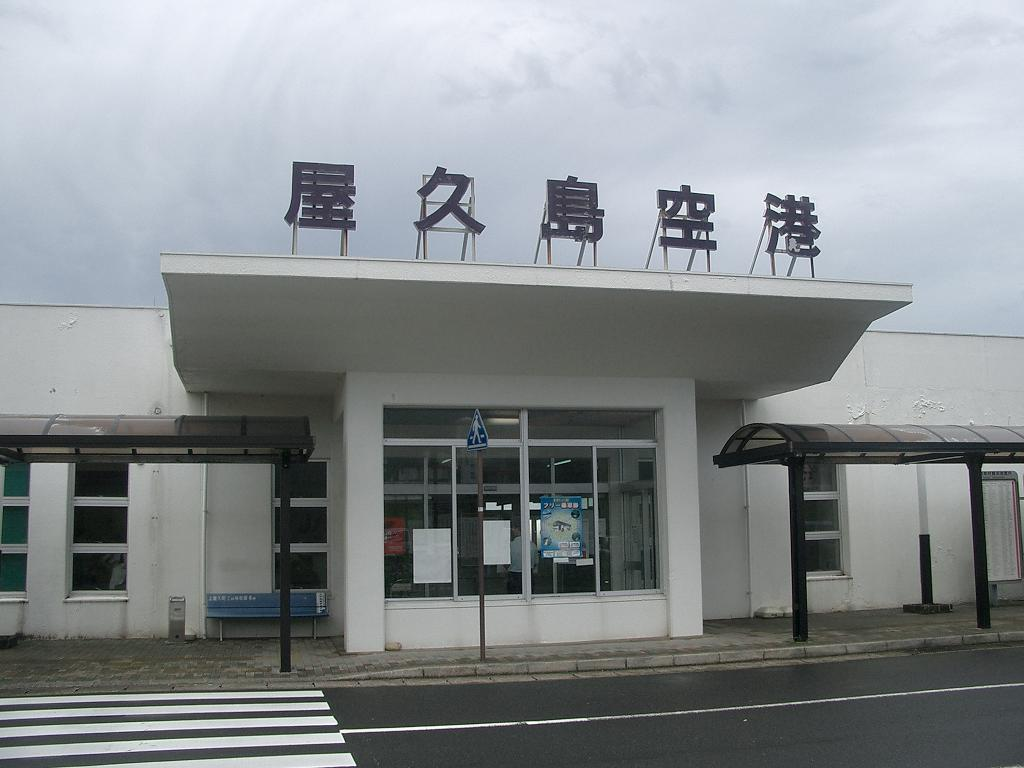
- IATA: KUM; ICAO: RJFC

Summary
- Airport type: Public
- Operator: Kagoshima Prefecture
- Serves: Yakushima, Japan
- Location: Yakushima
- Elevation AMSL: 37 m (121 ft)
- Coordinates: 30°23′08″N 130°39′33″E

Map
- Location in Japan RJFC (Japan)

Runways
Direction	Length		Surface
Direction	m	ft	Surface
14/32	1,500	4,921	Asphalt

Statistics (2015)
- Passengers: 164,980
- Cargo (metric tonnes): 135
- Aircraft movement: 4,752
- Source: Japanese Ministry of Land, Infrastructure, Transport and Tourism

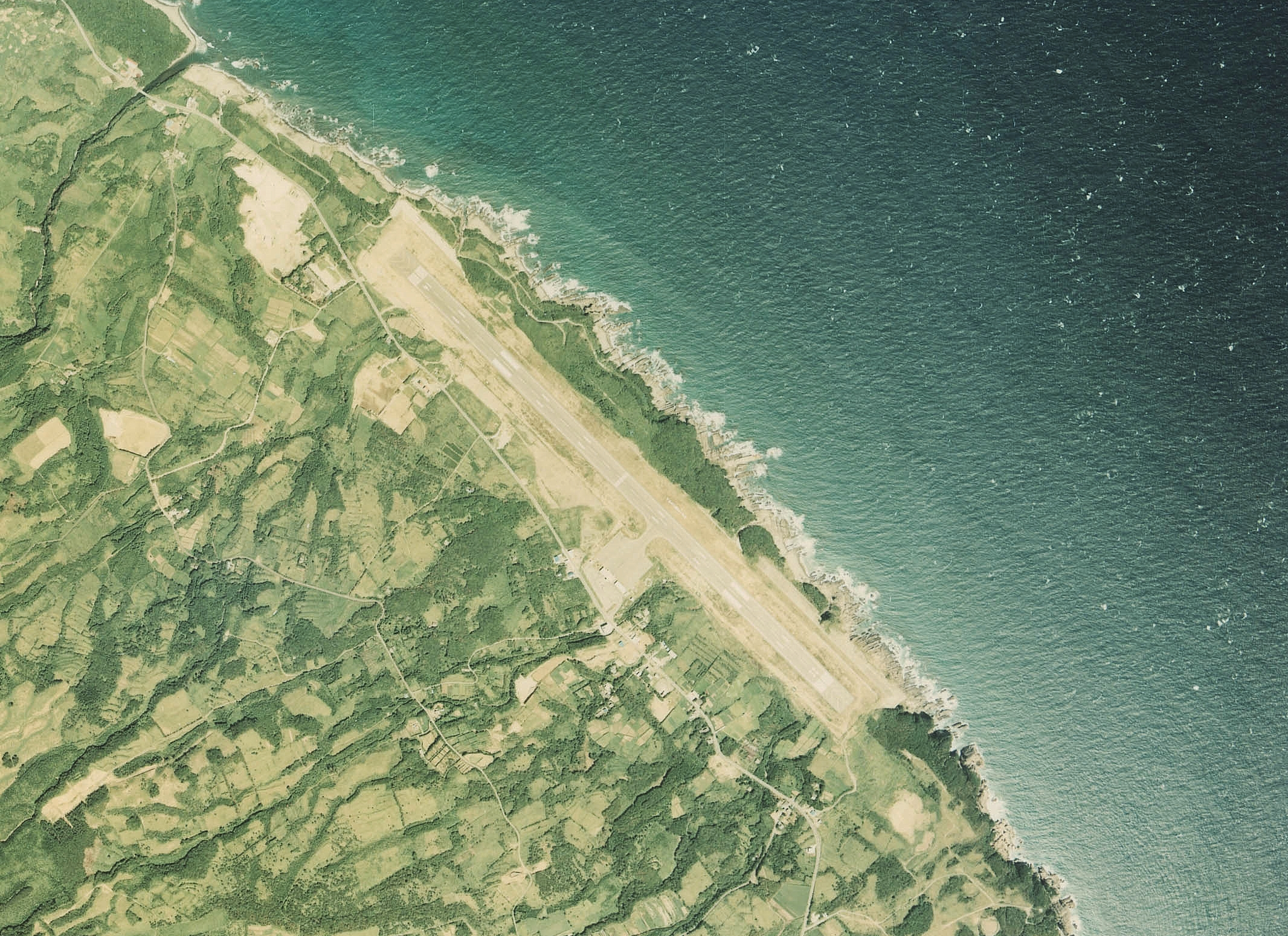
Aerial view near Yakushima Airport (1977)

Yakushima Airport (屋久島空港, Yakushima Kūkō) (IATA: KUM, ICAO: RJFC) is an airport located on the island of Yakushima in Kumage District, Kagoshima Prefecture, Japan. It lies by the coast, between the towns of Anbō and Miyanoura.

== History ==
The airport was opened in 1963 with an 1100-meter runway. The runway was extended to 1200 meters in 1975 and to 1500 meters in 1976. The runway was hardened in 2004 so as to allow DHC-8-400 aircraft to operate.

A further extension to 2000m has been approved, which will allow jet aircraft to operate. The master plan and environmental assessment for the extension are to be prepared in 2023. Ministry of Land, Infrastructure, Transport and Tourism announced in April 2024 that it had adopted the project to extend the runway to 2,000m starting this fiscal year.

== Facilities ==
The airport has a single terminal building with apron parking for two propeller aircraft. It is operational from 8:30 to 19:30 daily.

== Airlines and destinations ==
Airlines	Destinations
Japan Air Commuter	Fukuoka, Kagoshima, Osaka–Itami

== See also ==
- List of airports in Japan
