= Kamiyaku, Kagoshima =

Dissolved municipality in Kagoshima prefecture, Japan

Coordinates: 30°24′42″N 130°29′48″E

Kamiyaku (上屋久町, Kamiyaku-chō) was a town located on the northern half of Yakushima (Yaku Island) in Kumage District, Kagoshima Prefecture, Japan. Its major settlement is the port town of Anbō.

== History ==
As of 2003, the town had an estimated population of 6,903 and the density of 23.09 persons per km^{2}. The total area was 298.95 km^{2}.

On October 1, 2007, Kamiyaku, along with the town of Yaku (also from Kumage District), was merged to create the town of Yakushima.
