= Mount Miyanoura =

Mountain in Yakushima, Japan

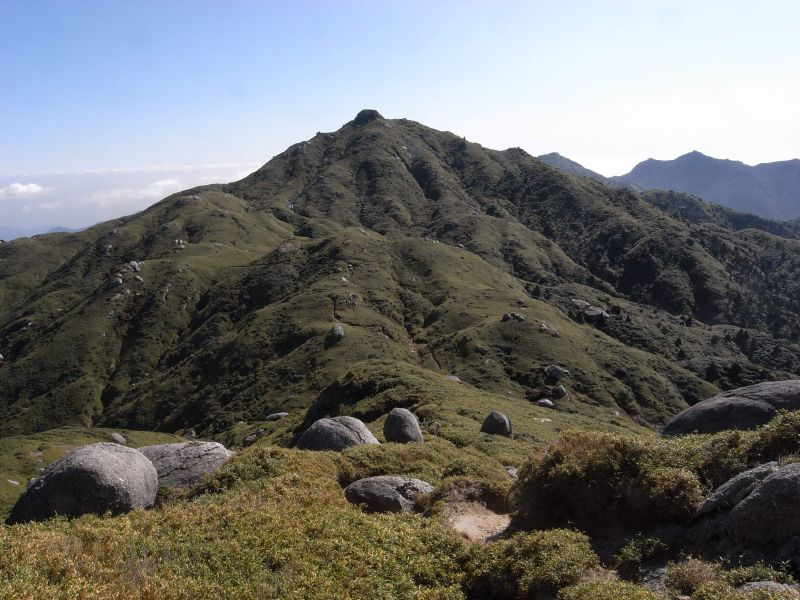

Highest point
- Elevation: 1,936 m (6,352 ft)
- Prominence: 1,936 m (6,352 ft)
- Listing: List of mountains and hills of Japan by height Ultra, Ribu
- Coordinates: 30°20′9.9″N 130°30′15″E

Naming
- Native name: 宮之浦岳 (Japanese)

Geography
- Location: Kagoshima Prefecture, Japan
- Topo map(s): Geographical Survey Institute 25000:1 苗場山, 50000:1 高田

Climbing
- Easiest route: Hike

Mount Miyanoura (宮之浦岳, Miyanoura-dake) is a mountain in central Yakushima in Kagoshima Prefecture. At an altitude of 1,936 m (6,352 ft), it is the highest peak of Yakushima and also the highest peak of the Kyushu region. It is one of the 100 Famous Japanese Mountains.

The mountains are registered in UNESCO World Heritage Site as "Yakushima".

== See also ==
- Miyanoura
- List of ultras of Japan
