= Kuchinoerabu-jima =

Volcanic island within the Satsunan Islands

Native name: Japanese: 口永良部島
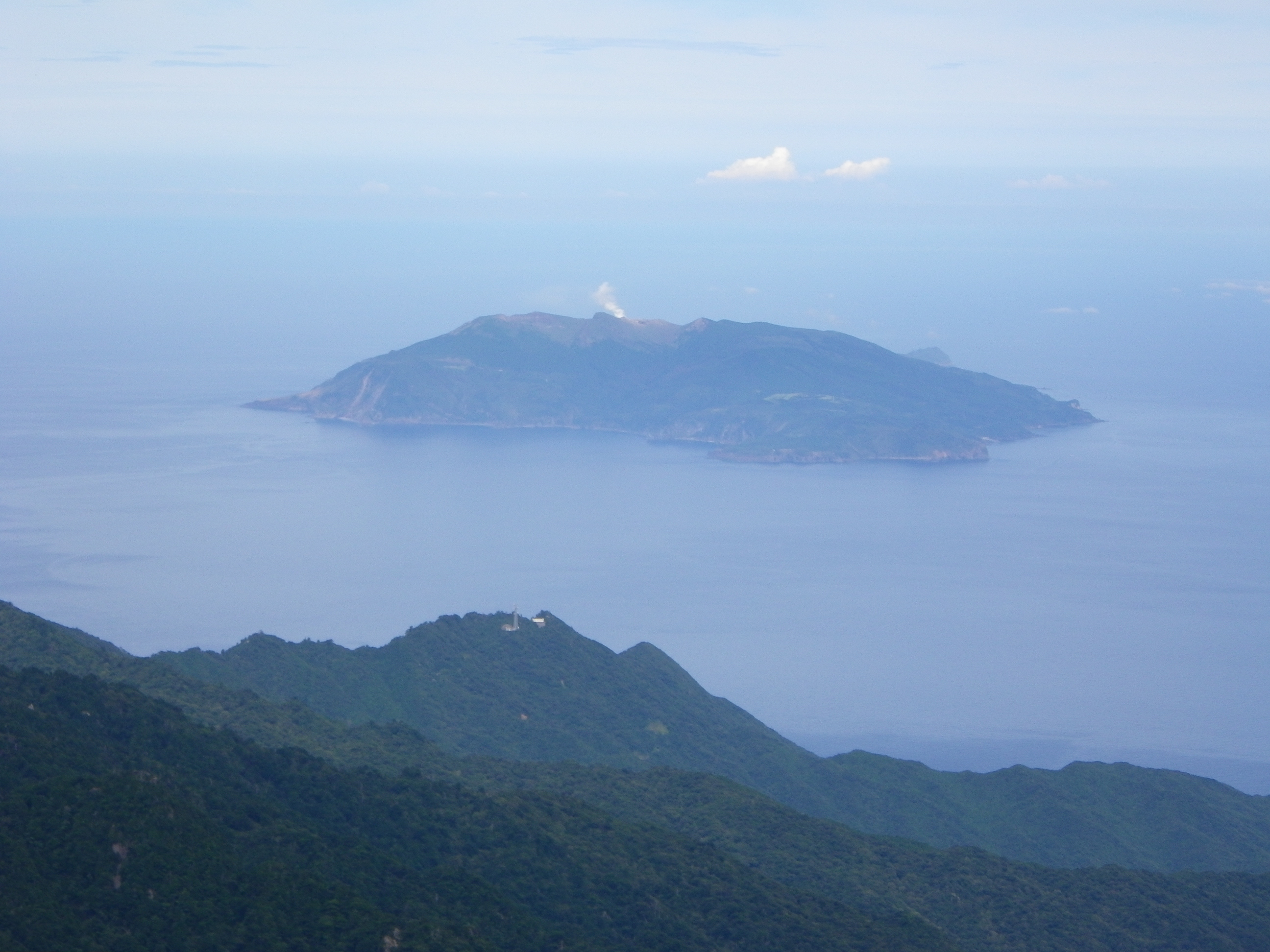
- Kuchinoerabu-jima from Nagatadake on Yakushima

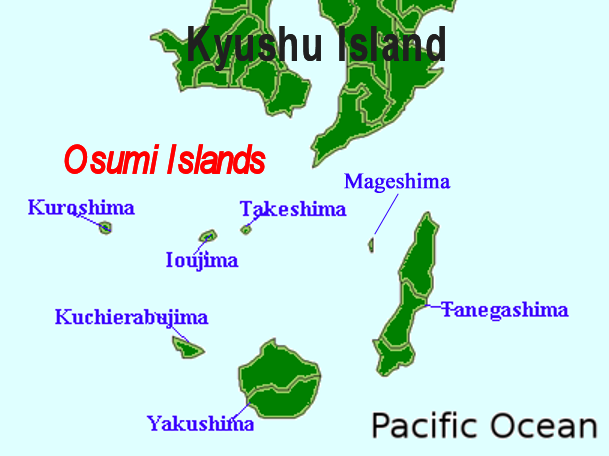

Geography
- Location: East China Sea
- Coordinates: 30°28′N 130°11′E
- Archipelago: Ōsumi Islands
- Area: 38.04 km^{2} (14.69 sq mi)
- Length: 12 km (7.5 mi)
- Width: 5 km (3.1 mi)
- Coastline: 49.67 km (30.864 mi)
- Highest elevation: 657 m (2156 ft)
- Highest point: Furudake

Administration
- Japan
- Kagoshima Prefecture

Demographics
- Population: 147 (2010)
- Pop. density: 3.86/km^{2} (10/sq mi)
- Ethnic groups: Japanese

Additional information
- Last eruption date 2020

Kuchinoerabu-jima (口永良部島), is one of the Satsunan Islands, usually classed with the Ōsumi Islands belonging to Kagoshima Prefecture, Japan. The island, 38.04 km^{2} (14.69 sq mi) in area, has a population of 147. The island can only be reached by boat as it has no airport. There is regular ferry service with Yakushima, which is about 15 km to the east. Travel time is approximately 1 hour. The islanders are dependent mainly on fishing, agriculture and seasonal tourism. The entire island is within the borders of the Kirishima-Yaku National Park.

== Geography ==
Kuchinoerabu-jima is located 130 kilometres (70 nmi) south of Kagoshima. The island is of volcanic origin, and has an area of approximately 38 square kilometres (15 sq mi) with a length of 12 kilometres (7.5 mi) and width of 5 kilometres (3.1 mi). The highest elevations on the island are Furudake (古岳), with a height of 657 metres (2,156 ft) and Shindake (新岳), with a height of 640 metres (2,100 ft) above sea level. There are numerous hot springs on the island.

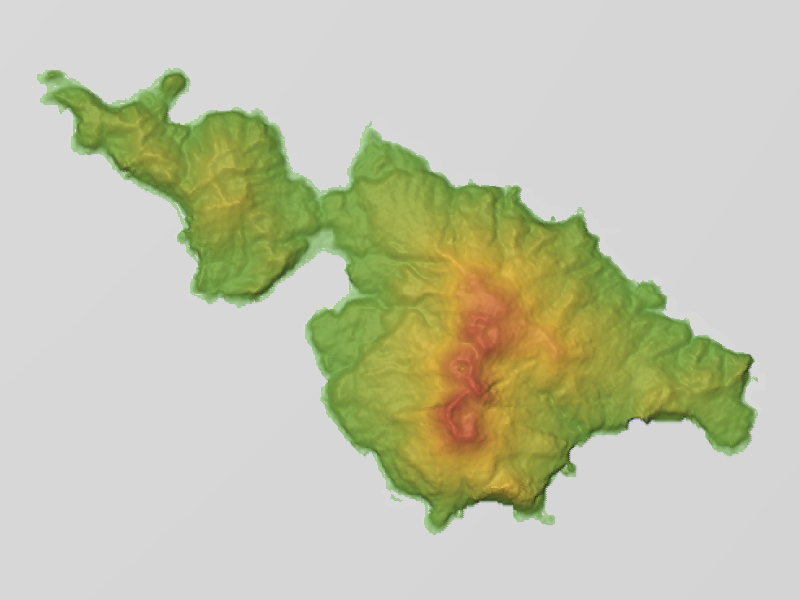
Relief Map

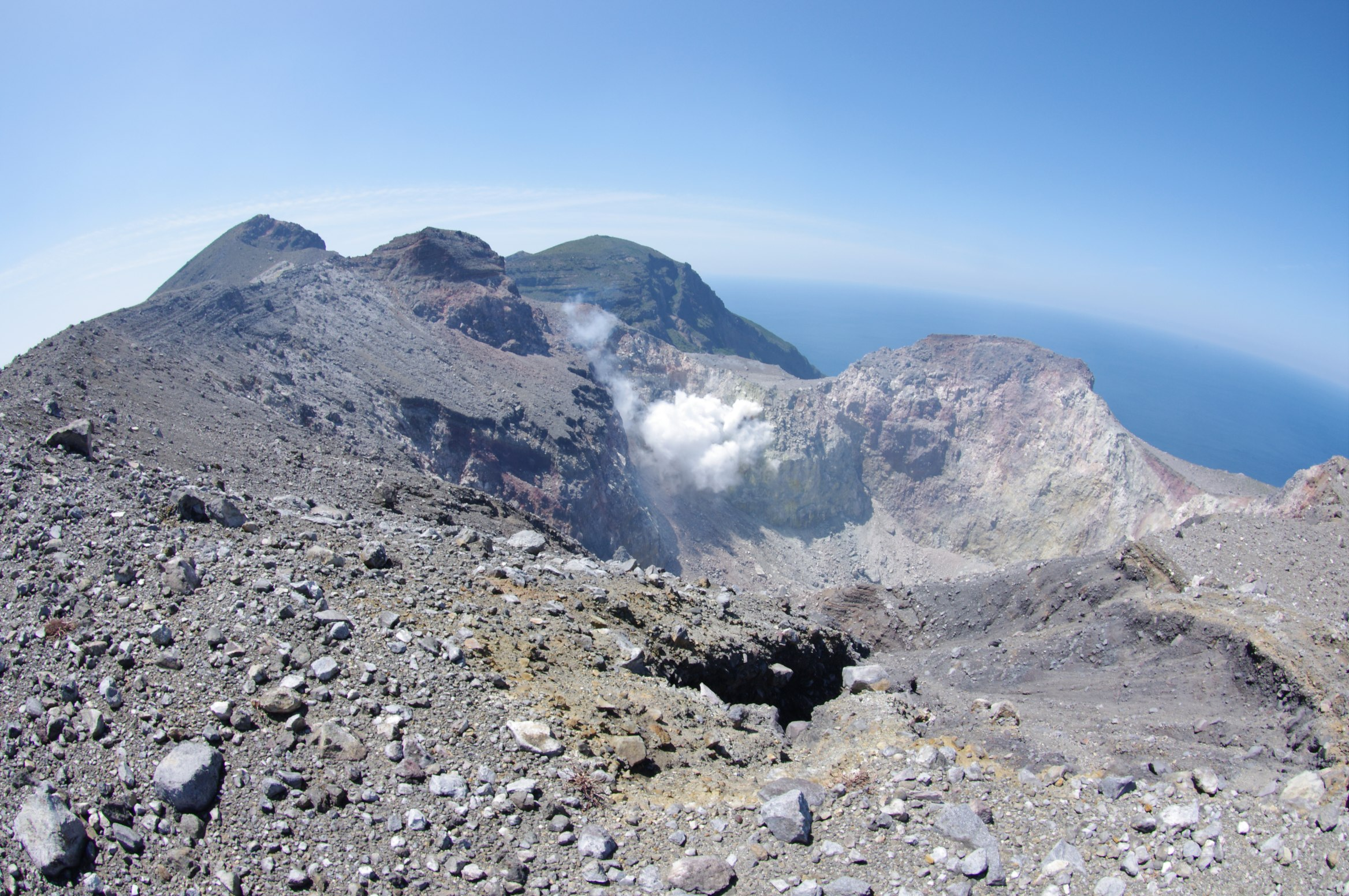
Shindake Crater

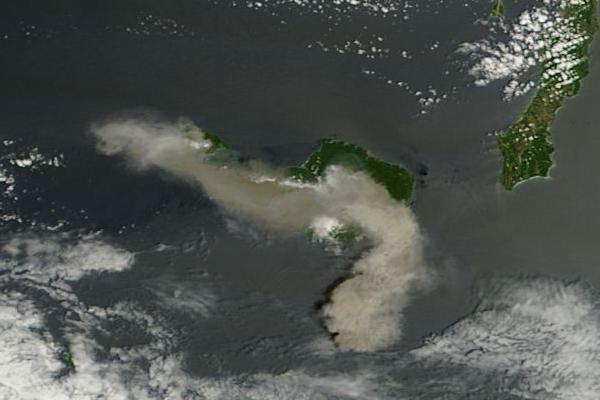
The 2015 eruption of the volcano.

The island is an active volcano which has erupted several times during the modern period, including 24 December 1933, when several people were killed when lava masses buried several villages. In 1980, multiple explosion craters appeared along an 800-metre (2,600 ft) north-south fissure on the slope east of Shindake. Shindake erupted again on 4 August 2014, generating a pyroclastic flow, but with no injuries or fatalities. The main crater erupted on the morning of 29 May 2015, prompting a level 5 alert level and the evacuation of the island.

The island's climate is classified as subtropical, with a rainy season from May through September.

== History ==
During the Edo period, Kuchinoerabu-jima was ruled by the Shimazu clan of Satsuma Domain and was considered part of Ōsumi Province. Following the Meiji restoration, it was administered as Kuchinoerabujima Village, which encompassed part of Yakushima. It is now part of the city of Yakushima, Kagoshima.

Kuchinoerabu-jima is the last known location of missing American poet Craig Arnold, who was visiting the island in April 2009, doing research for a book on volcanos.

== Volcanic eruptions of Mount Shindake ==
On May 18, 2015, Japanese scientists detected increased seismic activity and steam rising from the Shindake's crater, and on May 29, 2015, an eruption sent an ash cloud an estimated 30,000 feet (9,100 meters) into the sky. No deaths and only one minor injury were reported by the Japanese government. The island's 140 residents were evacuated by Japan's coast guard. Previous eruptions occurred in August, 2014 and in 1980.

Shindake crater erupted on December 18, 2018, ejecting an ash cloud 2 kilometers into above cloud coverage. Thirty days later on January 17, 2019, Shindake erupted again, sending pyroclastic flows 1.5 kilometers to the southwest and northwest of the crater as well as an ash cloud 6 kilometers into the atmosphere.

== See also ==
- List of islands in Japan
- List of volcanoes in Japan
