= Yakushima =

Island in Kagoshima Prefecture, Japan

Native name: Japanese: 屋久島
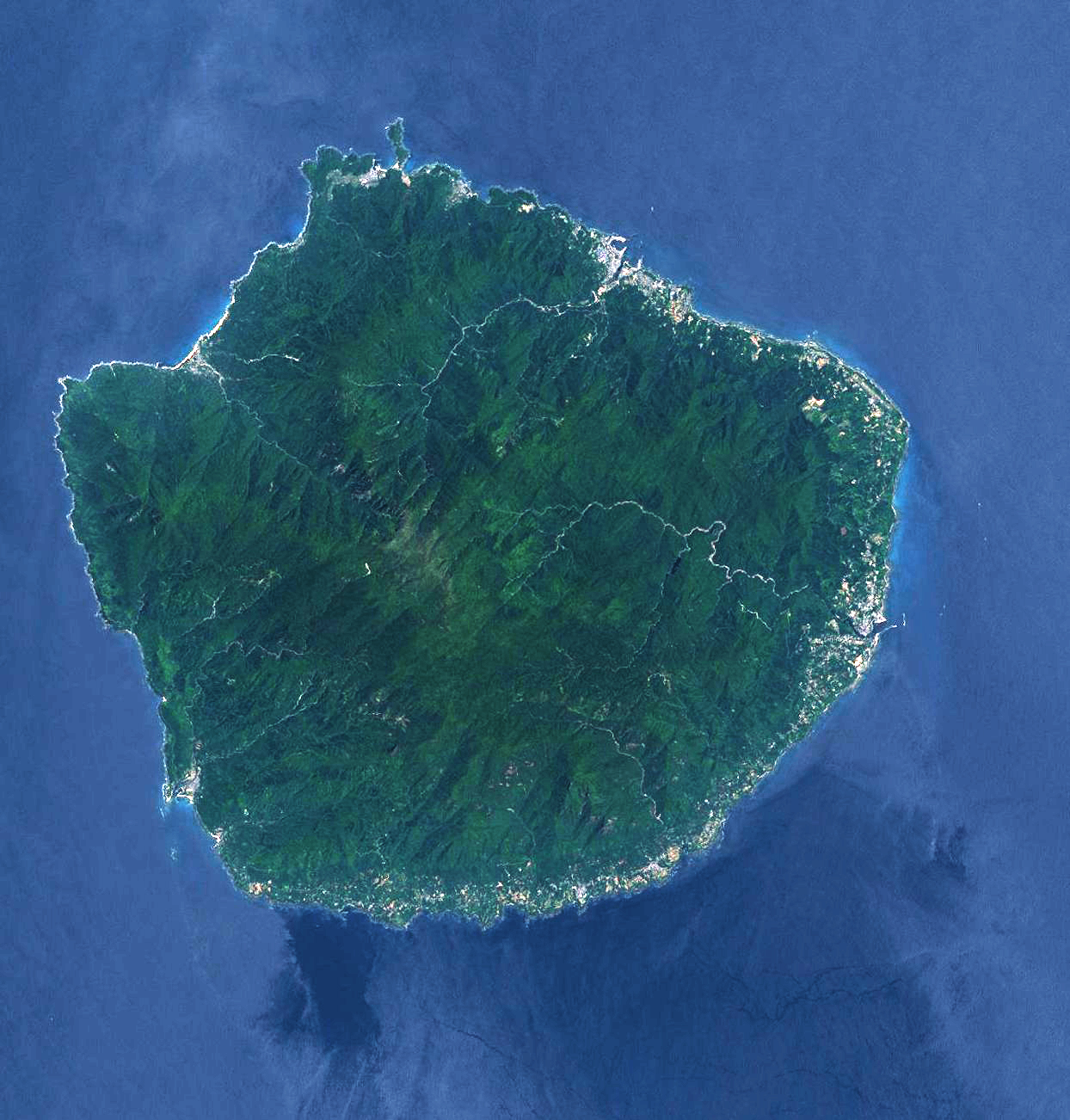
- Landsat image of Yakushima

- Location within Japan Location within Kagoshima Prefecture

Geography
- Location: East China Sea
- Coordinates: 30°20′38″N 130°31′26″E
- Archipelago: Ryukyu Islands
- Area: 504.88 km^{2} (194.94 sq mi)
- Highest elevation: 1,936 m (6352 ft)
- Highest point: Mount Miyanoura

Administration
- Japan
- Kagoshima Prefecture

Demographics
- Population: 11,698 (2022)
- Pop. density: 26.1/km^{2} (67.6/sq mi)
- Ethnic groups: Japanese

UNESCO World Heritage Site
- Criteria: Natural: vii, ix
- Reference: 662
- Inscription: 1993 (17th Session)
- Area: 10,747 ha (26,560 acres)

Ramsar Wetland
- Official name: Yakushima Nagata-hama
- Designated: 8 November 2005
- Reference no.: 1559

Yakushima (屋久島) is one of the Ōsumi Islands in Kagoshima Prefecture, Japan. The island, 504.88 km^{2} (194.94 sq mi) in area, has a population of 11,858. It is accessible by hydrofoil ferry, car ferry, or by air to Yakushima Airport.

The island is part of the town (chō) of Yakushima, which includes the neighbouring island of Kuchinoerabujima. 42% of the island is within the borders of the Yakushima National Park.

As of 2021, Yakushima's electricity generation was more than 99% hydroelectric, and surplus power has been used to produce hydrogen gas in an experiment by Kagoshima University. The island has been a test site for Honda's hydrogen fuel cell vehicle research.

== World Heritage designation ==
In 1980, an area of 18,958 ha (46,850 acres) was designated a UNESCO Man and the Biosphere Reserve. In 1993, 10 hectares (25 acres) of wetland at Nagata-hama was designated a Ramsar site. Yakushima is the largest nesting ground for the endangered loggerhead sea turtle in the North Pacific. The island's unique remnant of warm/temperate ancient forest has been a natural World Heritage Site since 1993.

== Geography ==
=== Overview ===
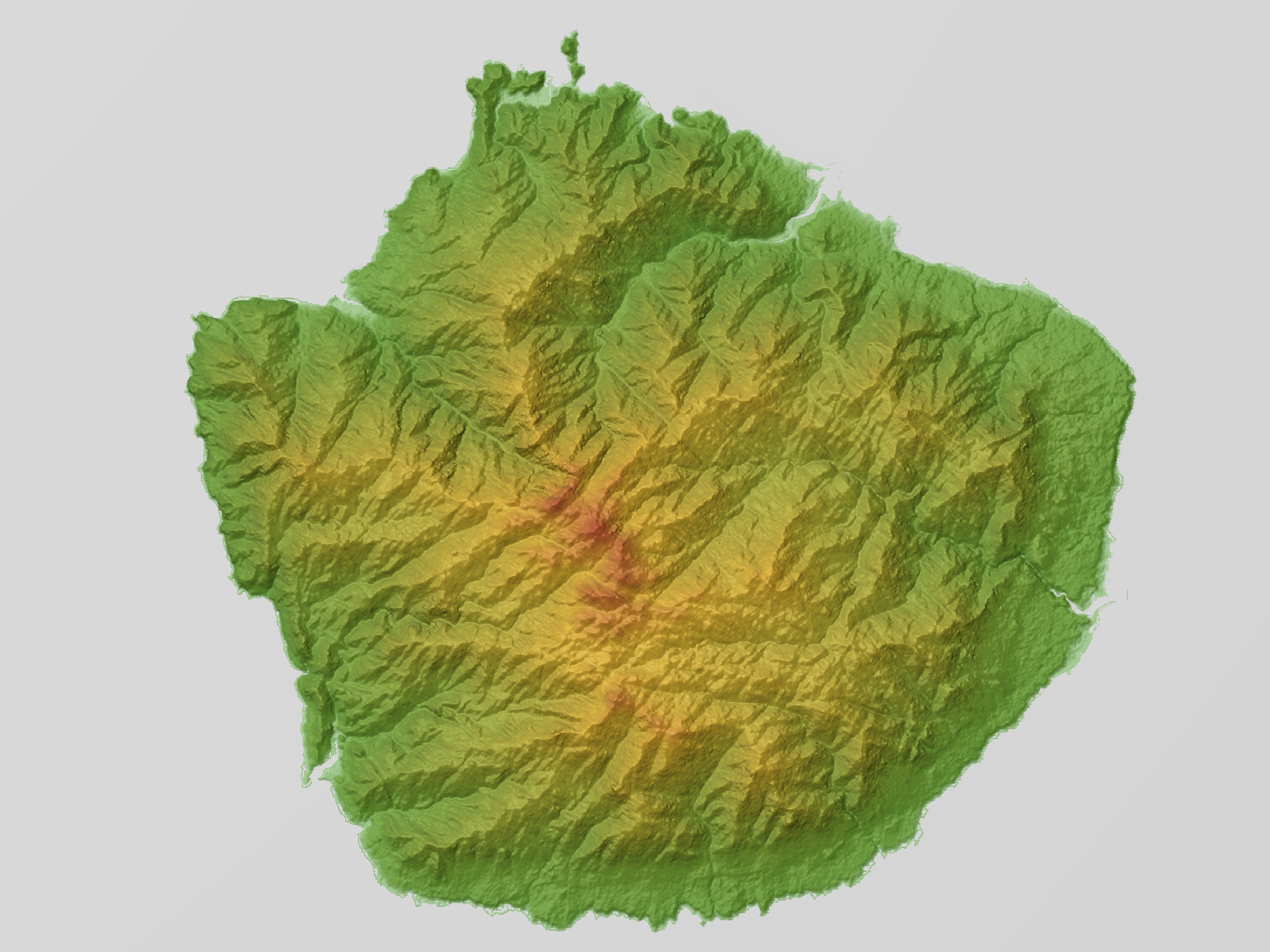
Relief map

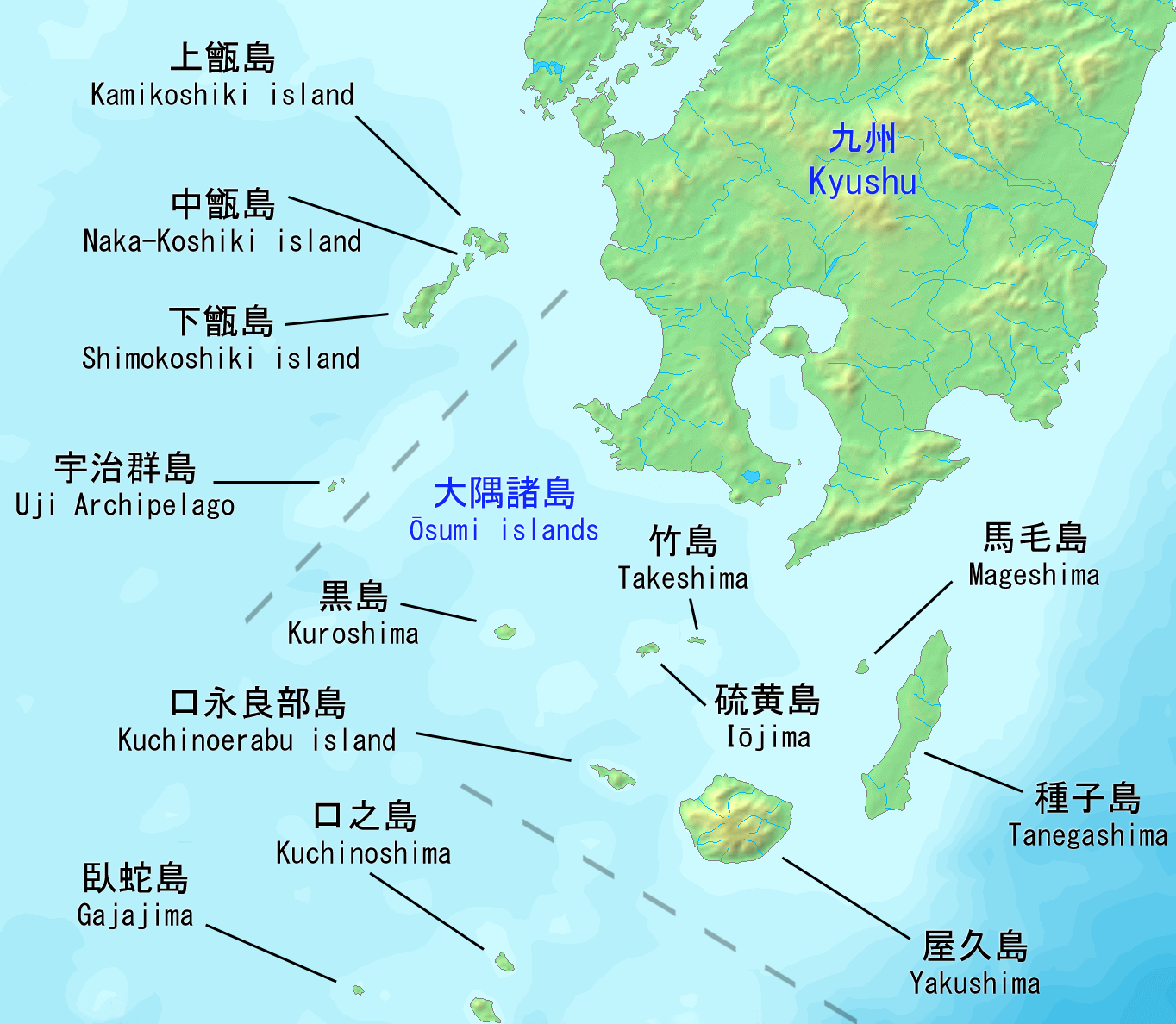
Osumi Islands map

Yakushima is located approximately 61.3 kilometres (38.1 mi) south of the southern tip of Ōsumi Peninsula in southern Kyushu, or 135 kilometres (73 nmi) south of Kagoshima. The Tanegashima Strait (Tanegashima Kaikyō) separates it from the nearby island of Tanegashima, which is home to the Japanese Space Centre. Periodic rocket launches from Tanegashima can clearly be seen from Yakushima.

The bedrock of the island is granite, so there are no active volcanoes. The island has an area of 504.5 square kilometres (194.8 sq mi) and is roughly circular, with a circumference of 89 kilometres (55 mi) and a diameter of 28 kilometres (17 mi). Its highest elevations are Miyanouradake (宮之浦岳), at 1,935 metres (6,348 ft), and Nagatadake (永田岳), at 1,886 metres (6,188 ft). Yakushima has another 30 peaks of over 1,000 metres (3,300 ft) in height. There are numerous hot springs on the island.

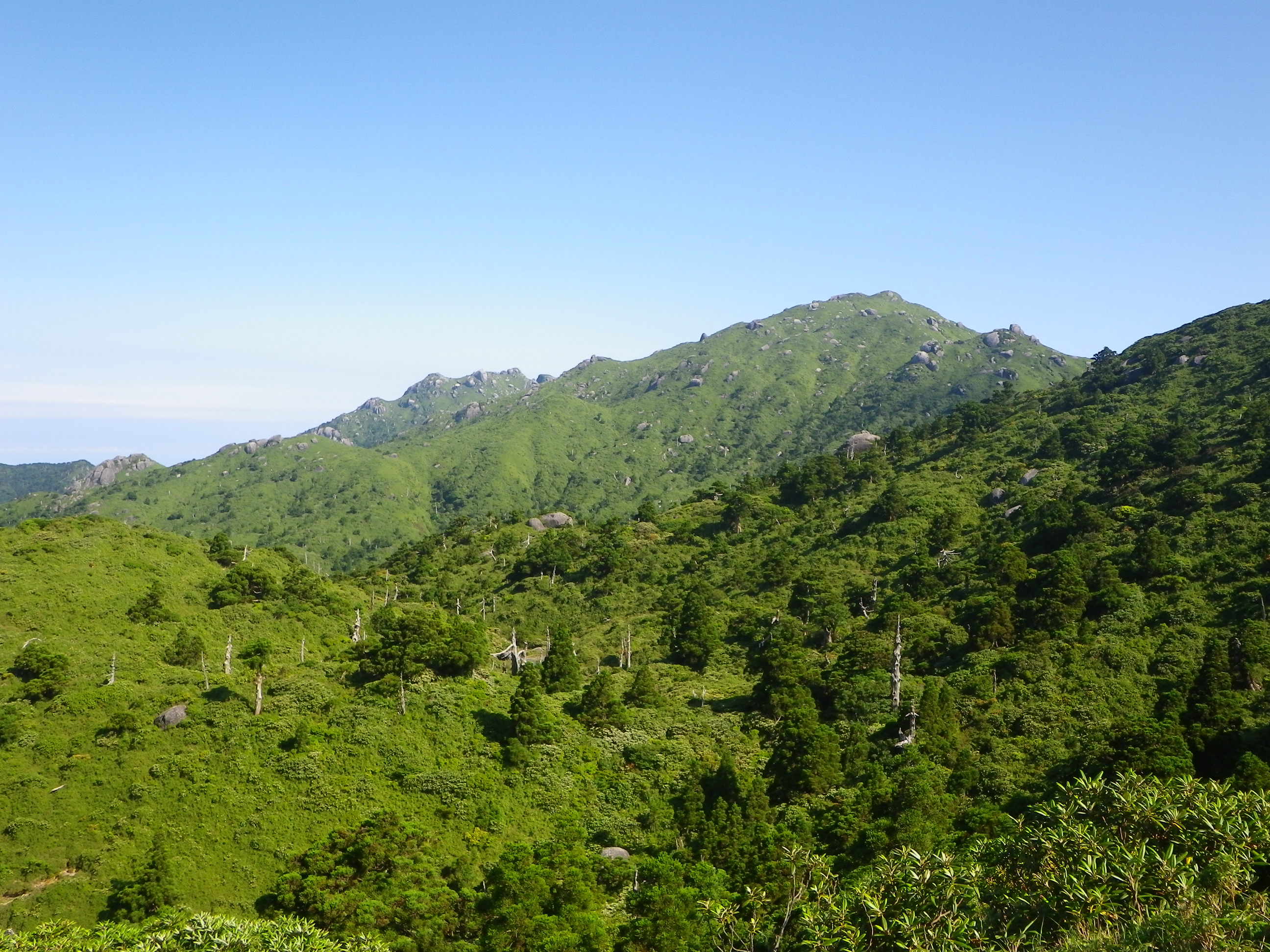
Yakushima Mitake, Mount Miyanoura, Mount Nagata, and Mount Kurio

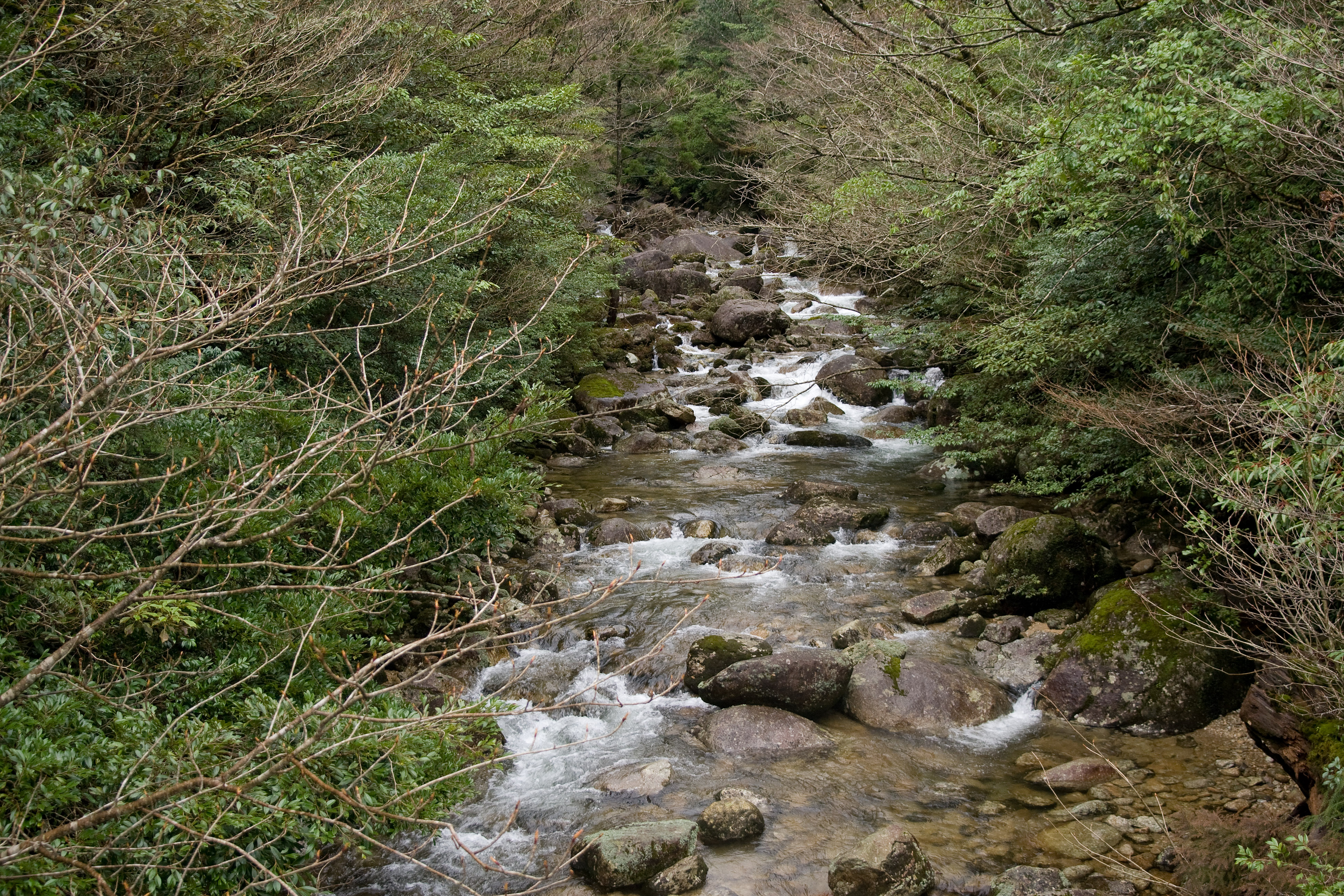
Anbo River

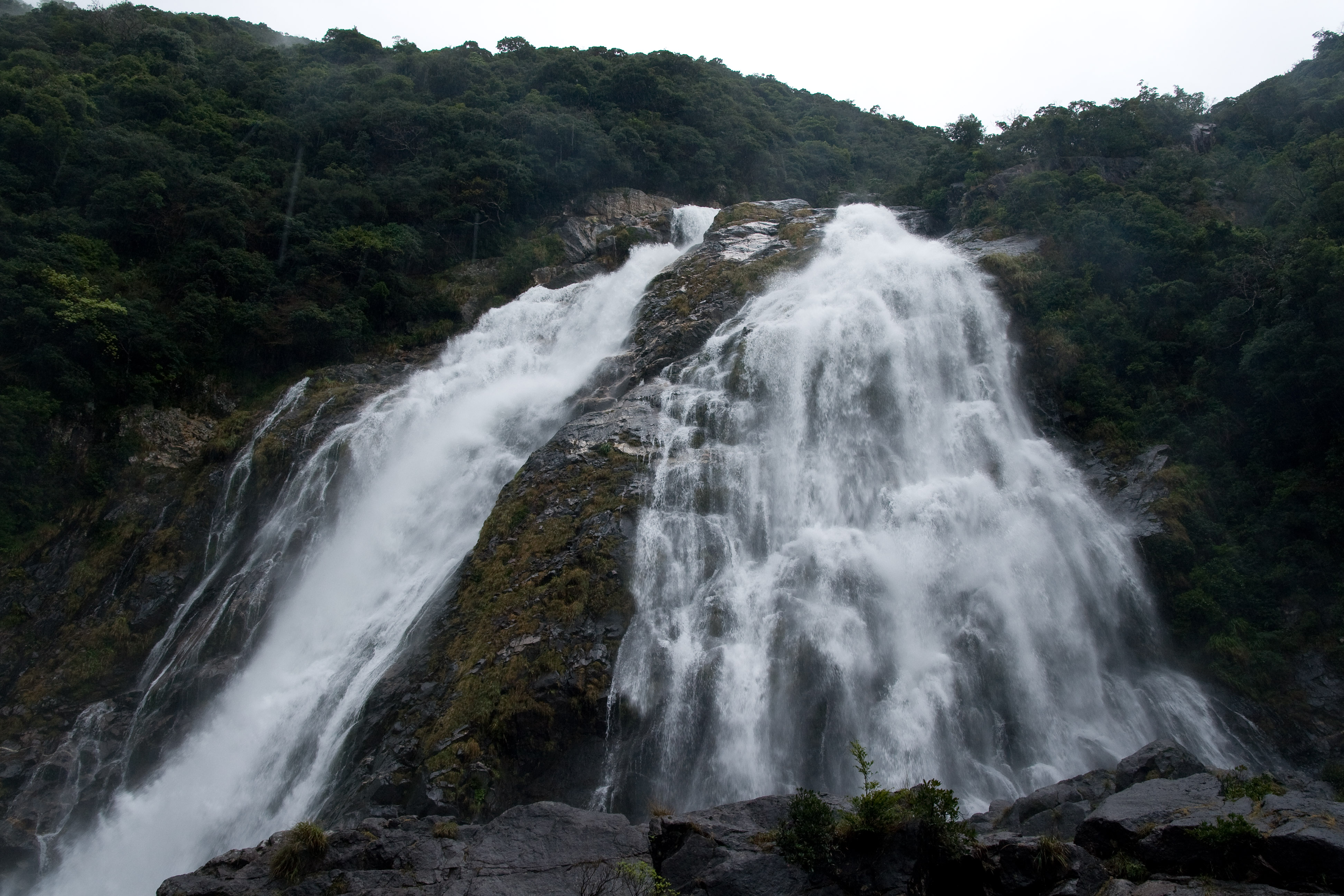
Ooko Falls

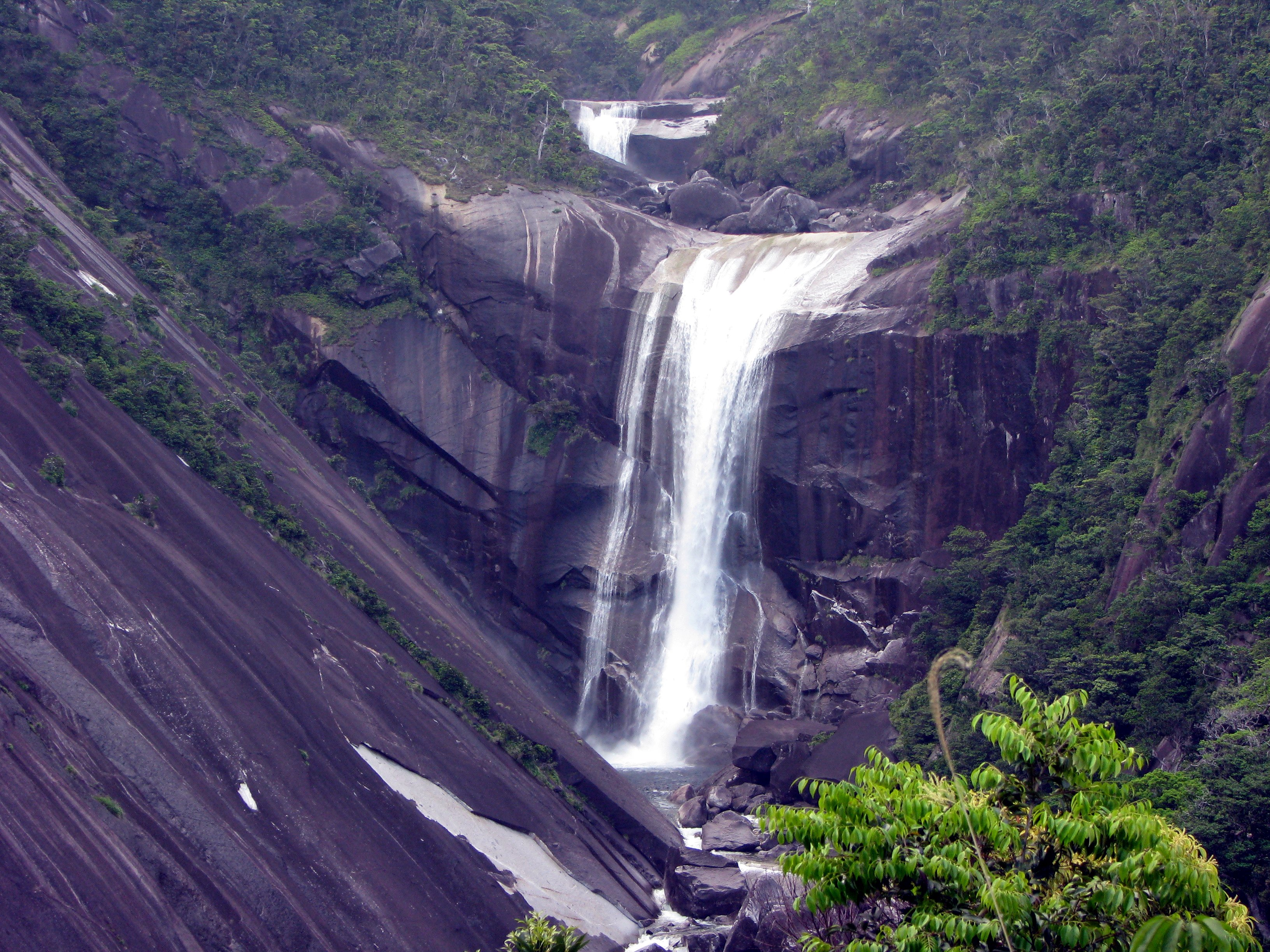
Senpiro Falls

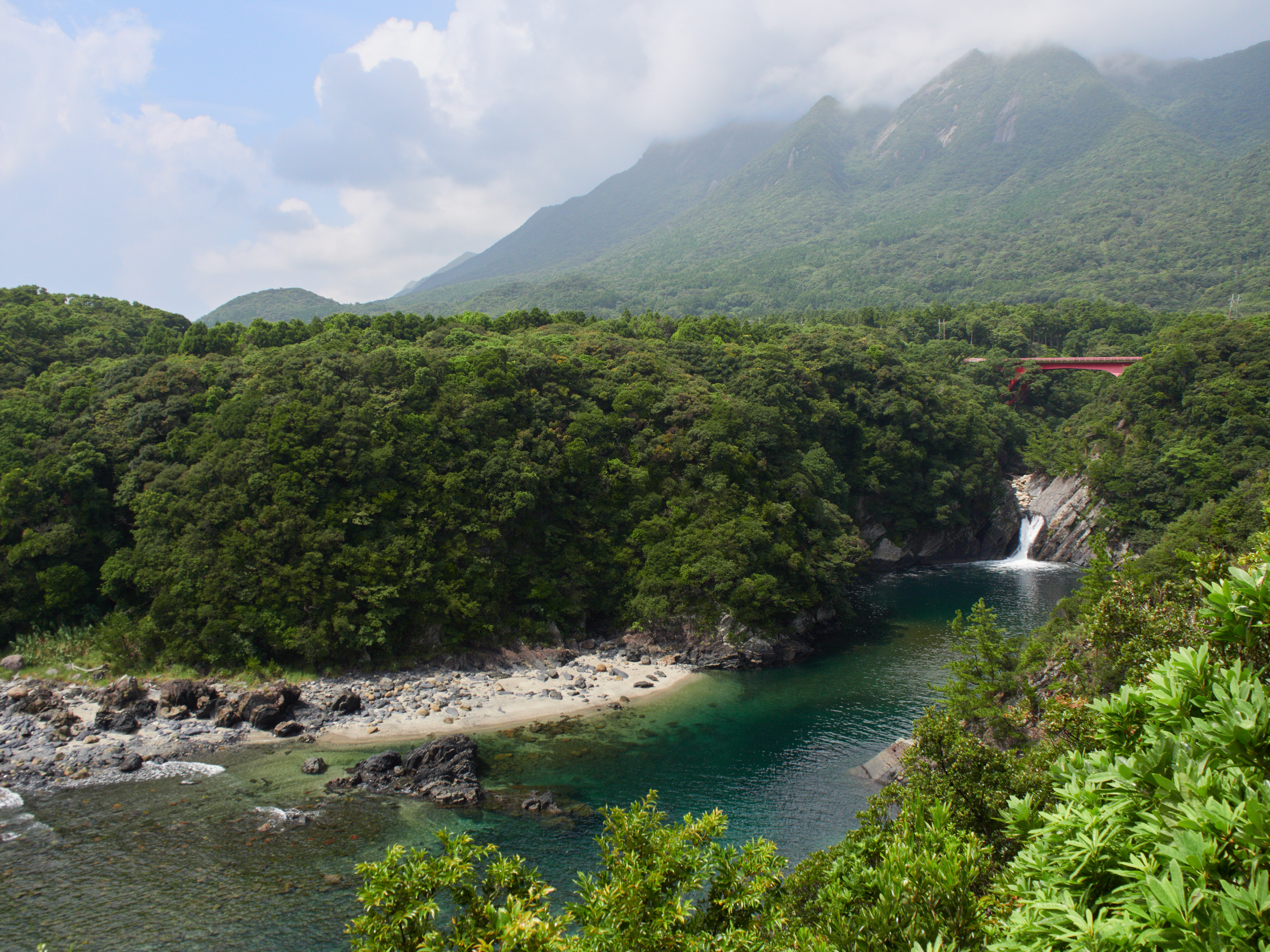
Toroki-no-taki Falls

=== Settlements ===
Major settlements of the island, which make up Yakushima municipality, are the port towns of Anbō and Miyanoura; between them is located Yakushima Airport. Other settlements are the coastal villages of Onoaida, Hirauchi, Kurio, Nagata, and the abandoned forest village of Kosugidani.

== History ==
Yakushima has been settled since at least the Jōmon period. It was first mentioned in written documents of the Chinese Sui dynasty of the 6th century. In 601, the Chinese sent an expedition to the "Country of Liukiu" (流求國). They noted that the people were small but pugnacious. They could not understand the local language, however, and returned to China. In 607, they sent another expedition to trade and brought back one of the islanders.

In the ancient Japanese history text Shoku Nihongi, in an entry dated 702 CE, it is said that Yakushima formed part of ancient Tane Province.

During the Edo period, Yakushima was ruled by the Shimazu clan of the Satsuma Domain and was considered part of Ōsumi Province. Following the Meiji restoration, the island has been administered as part of Kagoshima Prefecture.

In 2017, Yakushima was struck by Typhoon Noru, causing one death.

In November 2023, a United States Air Force V-22 Osprey crashed off the coast of Yakushima, killing seven crew members, with one crewmember going missing.

== Demographics and economy ==
The population of Yakushima reached its peak in 1960, with 24,010 inhabitants. It thereafter declined until about 1995 but has subsequently stabilized at 12,053 inhabitants as of 2020. Humans are far outnumbered on the island by wildlife.

Traditionally, the economic mainstays of the population were forestry and the export of wood products (principally cedar roof shingles), and commercial fishing. Cultivation of oranges and tea, the distilling of shōchū, and tourism are now the main sources of income.

== Flora and fauna ==
Yakushima contains one of the largest tracts of existing Nansei Islands subtropical evergreen forests, an endangered habitat ecoregion. The only large animals indigenous to the island are Yakushima macaques and a variety of sika deer. The Japanese raccoon dog is also a common animal but is not native to the island. Japanese weasels (Mustela itatsi) may also be seen from time to time. The island is a spawning ground for migratory loggerhead turtles, and dolphins are to be found offshore. The coastal areas have coral reefs in places, although to a much lesser extent than are found farther south in the islands of Okinawa.

Over 150 bird species live on Yakushima. The island, along with neighbouring Tanegashima, has been recognised as an Important Bird Area by BirdLife International, as they support populations of Japanese wood pigeons, Ryukyu green pigeons, and Ryukyu robins.

Yakushima is known for its lush vegetation. Most of the island has at one time or another been logged (dating back at least to the early Edo period), but it has been extensively replanted and reseeded since logging ended in the late 1960s, at which time a conservation regime was established. In addition to this secondary forest, there are some remaining areas of primary forest, composed mainly of a variety of Cryptomeria japonica, or Japanese cedar, called yakusugi (屋久杉), the best-known single example of which is Jōmon Sugi (縄文杉), as its age is estimated to date to at least the Jōmon period of Japanese history, 2,300 years ago. In addition, the island lists over 50 varieties of endemic flowers, notably rhododendrons, and hundreds of rare endemic Bryophyta, as well as a number of endemic trees.

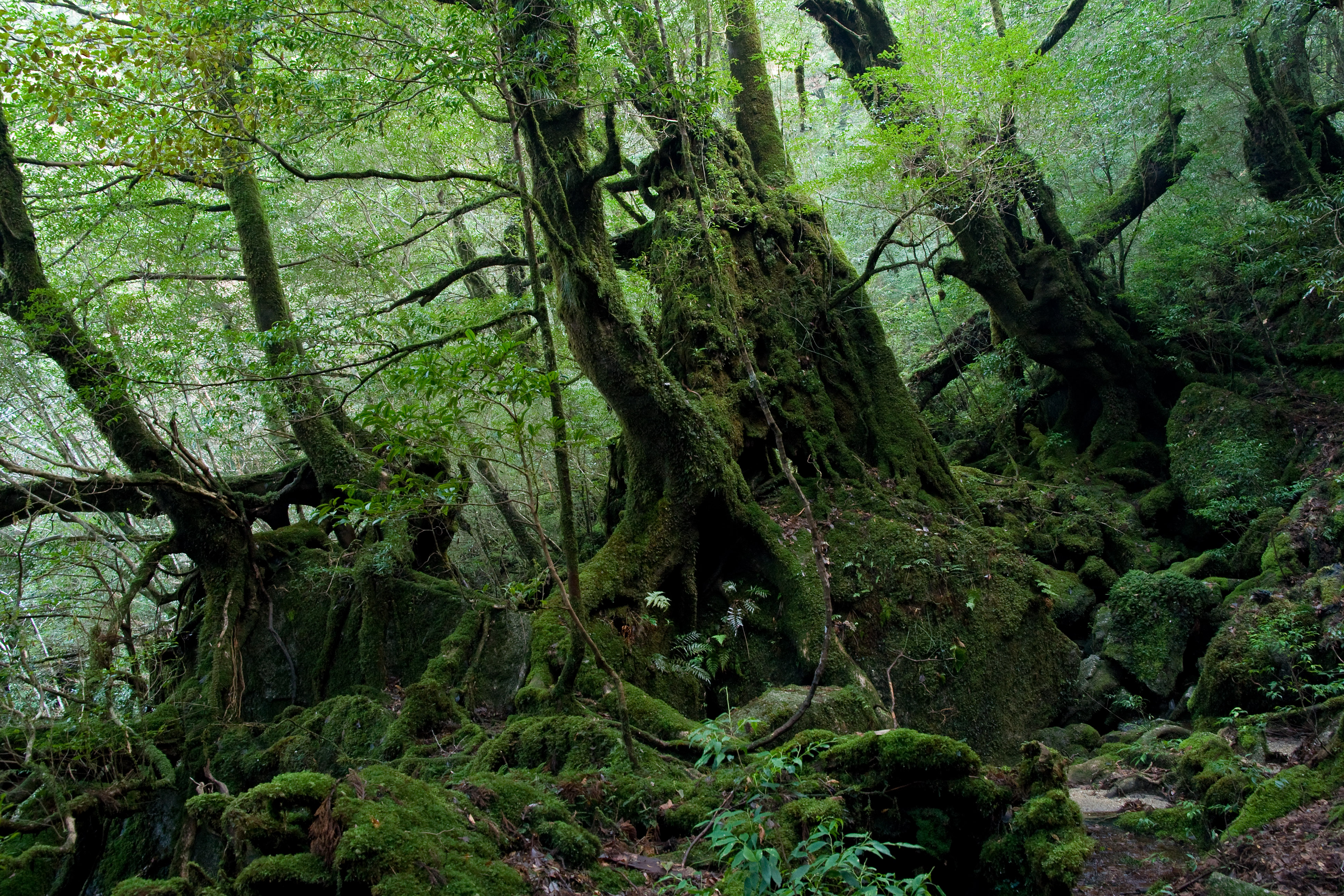
Shiratani Unsuikyo valley ja:白谷雲水峡 (900m altitude)

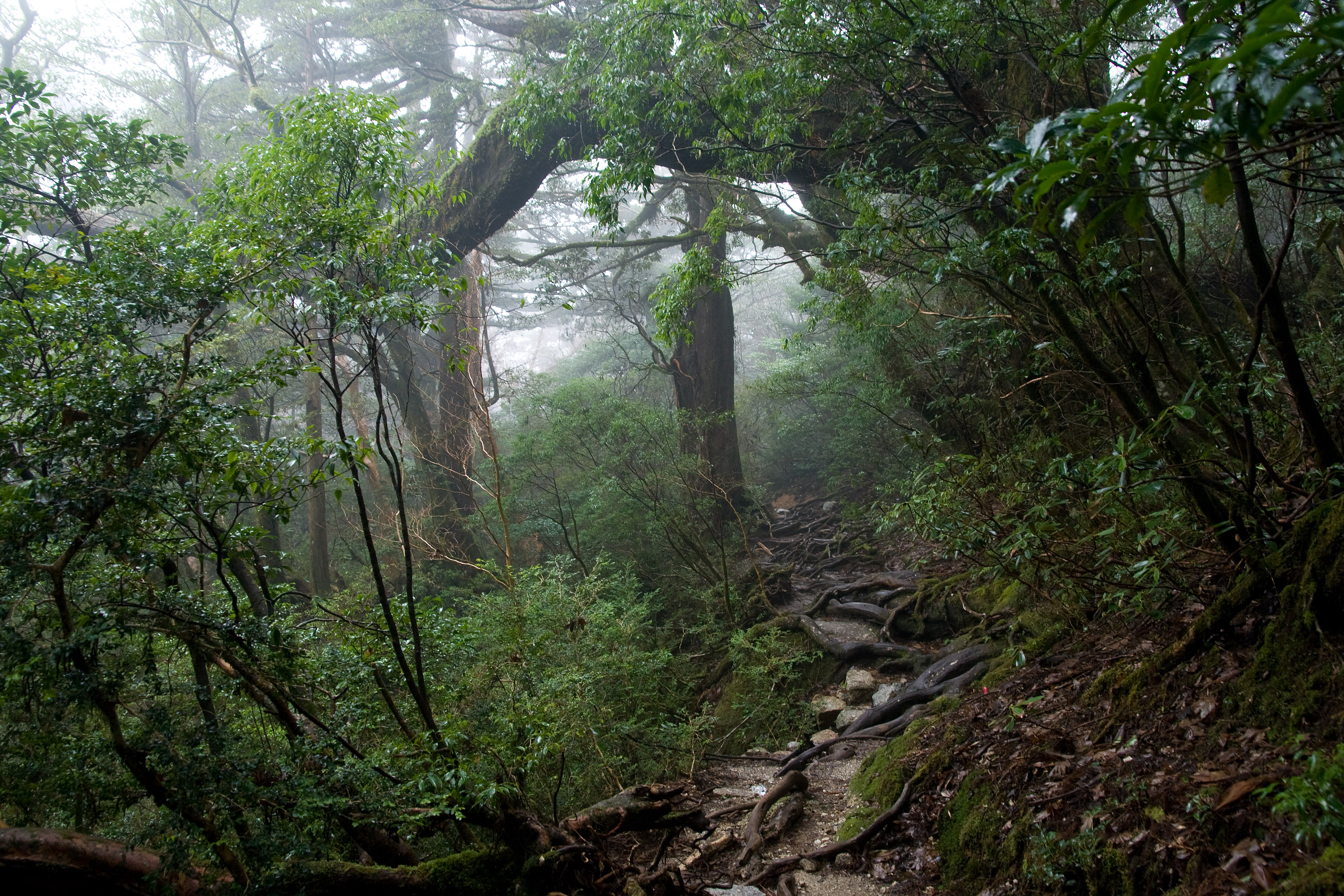
Temperate forest near Yodogawa hut (1,400m altitude)

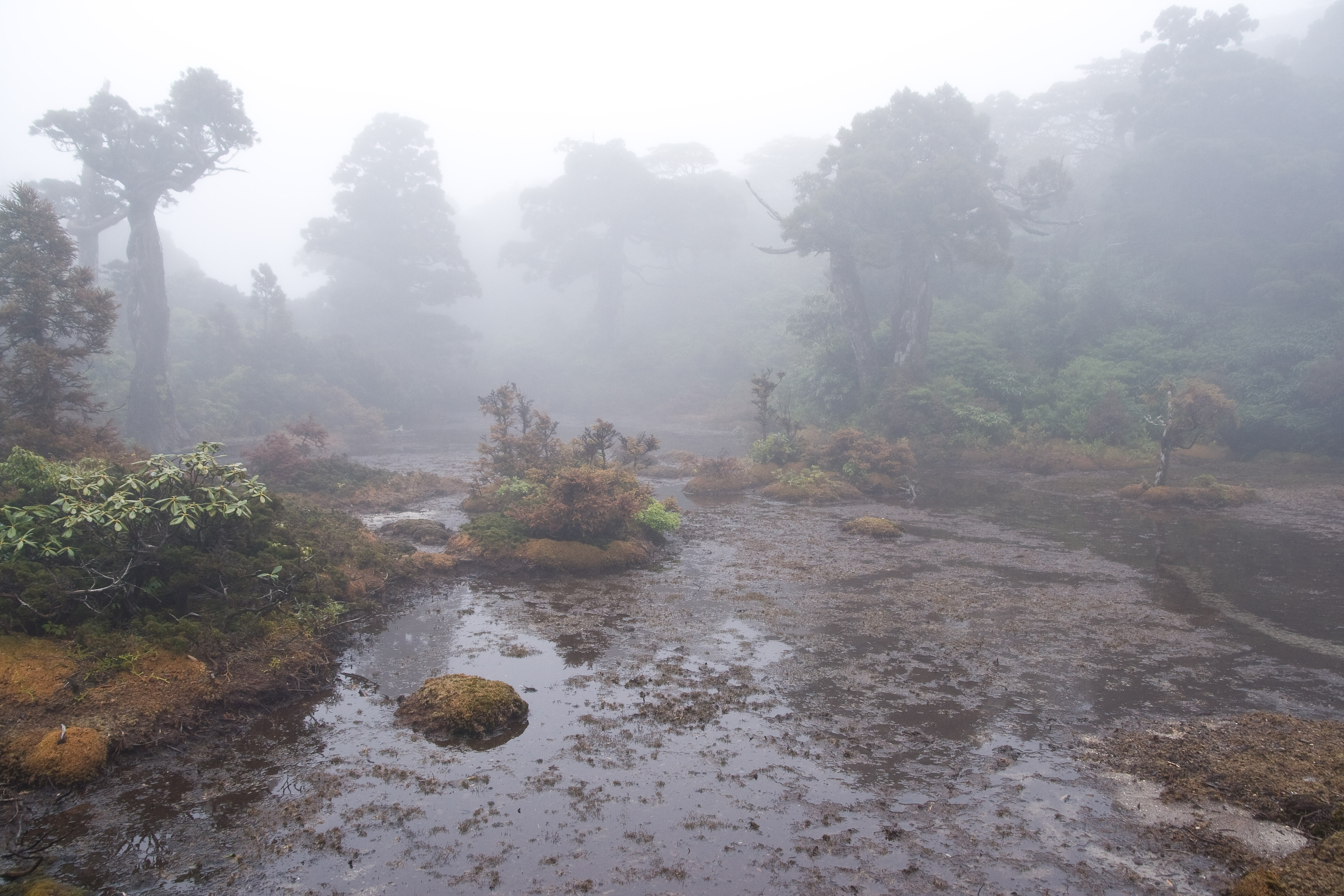
Kohananoe River in the high marshland (1,600m altitude)

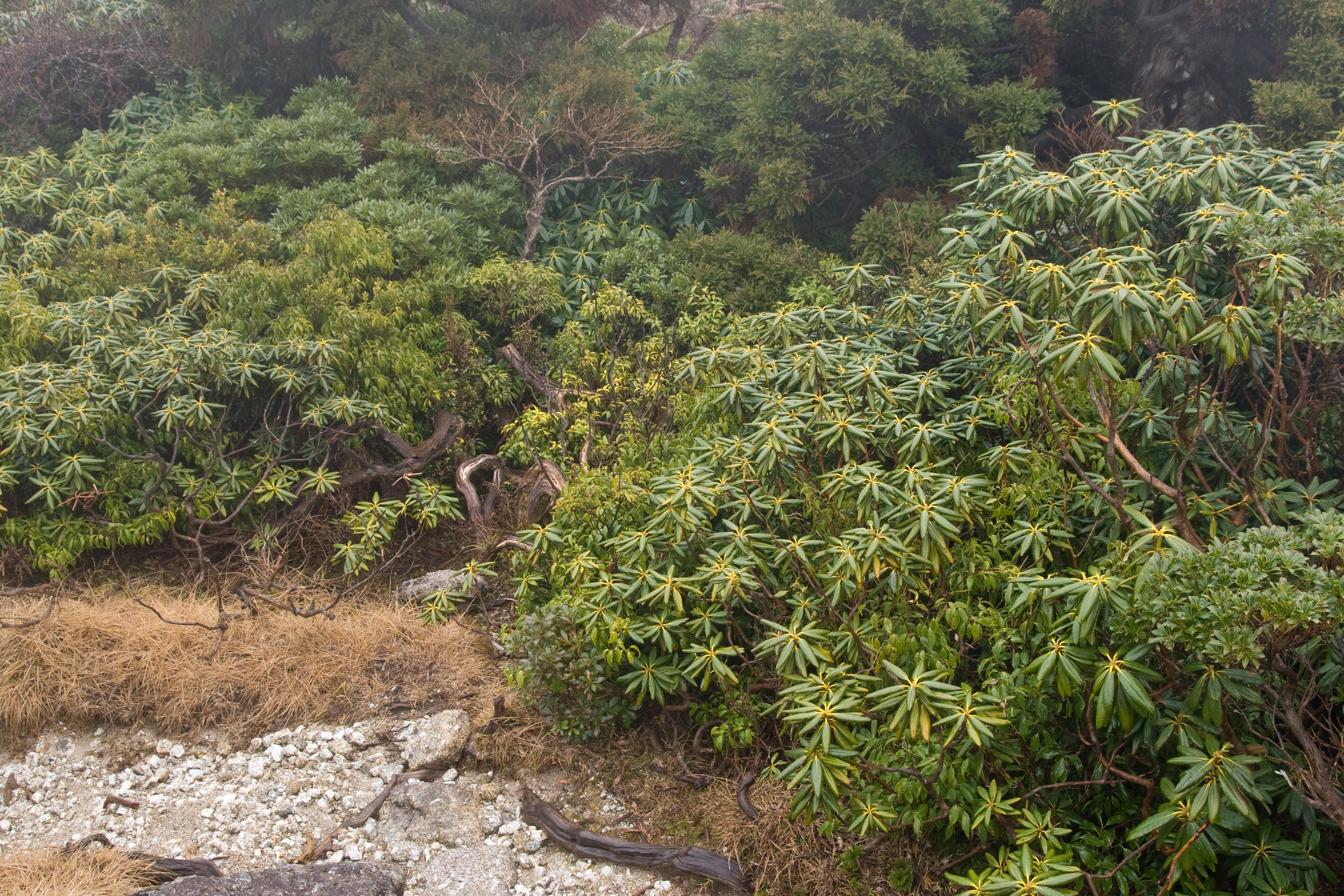
Sub-alpine vegetation, such as Yakushima rhododendron, at Kuromidake ja:黒味岳 (1,800m altitude)

== Climate ==
Yakushima has a humid subtropical climate (Köppen climate classification Cfa) with hot, humid summers and mild winters. Precipitation is extremely heavy, with at least 250 millimetres (9.8 in) in each month and as much as 773 millimetres (30.4 in) in June alone. Yakushima is Japan's wettest place, and annual precipitation there is one of the world's highest, at 4,000 to 10,000 mm (160 to 390 in). There are drier periods in autumn and winter, while the heaviest downpours occur in spring and summer, often accompanied by landslides. It is the southernmost place in Japan where there is snow in the mountains, often for months, while the ocean temperature is never below 19 °C (66 °F)

Climate data for Yakushima (1991–2020 normals, extremes 1937–present)
Month	Jan	Feb	Mar	Apr	May	Jun	Jul	Aug	Sep	Oct	Nov	Dec	Year
Record high °C (°F)	25.3 (77.5)	26.1 (79.0)	29.6 (85.3)	30.7 (87.3)	31.9 (89.4)	34.8 (94.6)	35.2 (95.4)	35.4 (95.7)	34.7 (94.5)	31.9 (89.4)	32.2 (90.0)	26.6 (79.9)	35.4 (95.7)
Mean maximum °C (°F)	21.2 (70.2)	22.2 (72.0)	24.2 (75.6)	26.0 (78.8)	28.6 (83.5)	32.0 (89.6)	33.1 (91.6)	33.2 (91.8)	31.6 (88.9)	29.0 (84.2)	25.9 (78.6)	22.4 (72.3)	33.9 (93.0)
Mean daily maximum °C (°F)	14.7 (58.5)	15.5 (59.9)	18.0 (64.4)	21.4 (70.5)	24.5 (76.1)	26.9 (80.4)	30.5 (86.9)	30.9 (87.6)	28.9 (84.0)	25.2 (77.4)	21.2 (70.2)	16.8 (62.2)	22.9 (73.2)
Daily mean °C (°F)	11.8 (53.2)	12.3 (54.1)	14.6 (58.3)	17.8 (64.0)	21.0 (69.8)	23.7 (74.7)	27.0 (80.6)	27.5 (81.5)	25.7 (78.3)	22.2 (72.0)	18.2 (64.8)	13.9 (57.0)	19.6 (67.3)
Mean daily minimum °C (°F)	8.9 (48.0)	9.2 (48.6)	11.3 (52.3)	14.2 (57.6)	17.5 (63.5)	21.0 (69.8)	23.9 (75.0)	24.6 (76.3)	22.8 (73.0)	19.4 (66.9)	15.2 (59.4)	11.0 (51.8)	16.6 (61.9)
Mean minimum °C (°F)	4.3 (39.7)	4.7 (40.5)	6.0 (42.8)	9.0 (48.2)	12.9 (55.2)	16.8 (62.2)	21.5 (70.7)	22.1 (71.8)	19.2 (66.6)	14.7 (58.5)	10.1 (50.2)	5.9 (42.6)	3.5 (38.3)
Record low °C (°F)	1.0 (33.8)	0.7 (33.3)	1.5 (34.7)	4.5 (40.1)	10.1 (50.2)	13.7 (56.7)	18.3 (64.9)	19.6 (67.3)	15.2 (59.4)	9.1 (48.4)	5.6 (42.1)	2.2 (36.0)	0.7 (33.3)
Average precipitation mm (inches)	294.6 (11.60)	289.2 (11.39)	387.0 (15.24)	405.5 (15.96)	444.1 (17.48)	860.3 (33.87)	362.4 (14.27)	256.5 (10.10)	450.7 (17.74)	309.9 (12.20)	309.6 (12.19)	281.8 (11.09)	4,651.7 (183.14)
Average snowfall cm (inches)	0 (0)	0 (0)	0 (0)	0 (0)	0 (0)	0 (0)	0 (0)	0 (0)	0 (0)	0 (0)	0 (0)	0 (0)	0 (0)
Average precipitation days (≥ 0.5 mm)	17.2	15.2	16.2	13.5	13.7	19.6	12.5	14.6	15.5	12.8	12.8	15.8	179.3
Average relative humidity (%)	68	68	69	71	76	85	83	82	81	74	71	69	75
Mean monthly sunshine hours	74.9	83.2	117.9	146.2	152.7	100.0	209.9	201.3	139.8	115.9	97.3	78.8	1,515.8
Source: Japan Meteorological Agency

See or edit raw graph data.

=== Pollution ===
According to a disputed theory published in a 2009 paper, airborne pollutants from China may have affected the Yakushima white pine.

== Transportation ==
=== Airport ===
Yakushima Airport (KUM) is the only airfield serving the island. A flight to KUM from Kagoshima Airport takes approximately 40 minutes.

=== Ferries ===
Tanegayaku High Speed Ship Jetfoil "Toppy" "Rocket"

- Kagoshima Port, Minato Pier, Kagoshima City – Ibusuki Port (Ibusuki City) in Tanegashima, Nishinoomote Port (Nishinoomote City), Yakushima, Miyanoura Port, or Anbo Port.

==== Other ====
- Orita Kisen "Ferry Yakushima 2"
  - Kagoshima Minato-ku Minami Pier-Yakushima / Miyanoura Port
- Kagoshima Merchant Ship & Shinyashiki Shoji Ferry "Haibisukasu" [40]
  - Taniyama Port 2 Ward (Kagoshima City) – Tanegashima Nishinoomote Port (Nishinoomote City) – Yakushima Miyanoura Port
- Yakushima Town "Ferry Taiyo"
  - Kuchinoerabujima – Yakushima / Miyanoura Port – Tanegashima / Shimama Port (Minamitanemachi)

=== Railway ===
The last operating narrow-gauge (762mm gauge) timber railway in Japan is on the island, but it only transports freight.

== Hot springs ==
There are several onsen (hot springs) on Yakushima. They can be used for bathing or as natural spas.

- Hirauchi underwater hot spring
- Jomon no Yado Manten
- Onoma Onsen
- Oura hot spring
- Yakushima Onsen
- Yodogawa Onsen
- Yudomari Onsen
- Yunoko no Yu

== In popular culture ==
- The forests of Yakushima inspired the forest setting in Hayao Miyazaki's film Princess Mononoke.
- Yakushima is the inspiration behind the forest of Dremuchij in Metal Gear Solid 3: Snake Eater.
- The fictional characters Jun and Jin Kazama of Tekken lived on Yakushima.
- The landscapes in Oni: Thunder God's Tale are inspired by Yakushima's forests.
- The main setting of episodes 1153 and 1154 of Detective Conan is Yakushima, where a murder takes place deep in the forest near the ancient Jōmon Sugi.

== See also ==
- List of World Heritage Sites in Japan
- List of national parks of Japan
