= List of records of Japan =

List of records of Japan is an annotated list of Japanese records organised by category.

== Geography ==
- The tallest mountain: Mount Fuji, Shizuoka and Yamanashi, 3,776 m.
  - Mount Niitakayama, the current Jade Mountain (Yùshān), 3,952 m, was once the highest when Taiwan was administered by Japan.
- The lowest mountain: Disputed, candidates include:
  - Ōgata Fuji, Ōgata, Akita: 3.77 m (Altitude 0 m).
  - Tenpōzan, Ōsaka, Ōsaka, 4.53 m.
  - Hiyoriyama, Sendai, Miyagi, 3 m.
    - The lowest natural mountain: Bentenyama, Tokushima, Tokushima, 6.1 m.
- The largest lake: Lake Biwa, Shiga. 670.33 km².
- The largest island: Honshū, 227,945.15 km².
  - The largest island, excluding 4 major islands: Okinawa Island, 1,206.49 km².
    - Etorofu Island (Iturup), 3,182.65 km², currently administered by Russia, is the largest island claimed by Japan.
  - The largest remote island, without its prefectural capital: Sado Island, Niigata, 854.88 km².
- The smallest island: Okinotorishima, Ogasawara, Tokyo. (The status as an island is disputed by the People's Republic of China.)
- The largest uninhabited island: Oshima Ōshima, Hokkaidō, 9.73 km².
- The smallest inhabited island: Warabi Kojima, Gotō, Nagasaki, 0.03 km², population of 9 people (2005).
- The longest river: Shinano River, Niigata, Gunma, and Nagano. 367 km.
- The shortest river: Shiokawa River, Okinawa, 300 m.
- The narrowest sea strait in the world: Dofuchi Strait, (ja:土渕海峡), Kagawa, 9.93 m at its narrowest point.
- The highest temperature:
  - Official record: Kumagaya, Saitama 41.1 °C, July 23, 2018.
  - Unofficial record: Adachi, Tokyo, 42.7 °C, July 20, 2004.
- The lowest temperature:
  - Official record: Asahikawa, Hokkaidō, -41.0 °C, January 25, 1902.
  - Unofficial record: Bifuka, Hokkaidō, -41.5 °C, January 27, 1931.
- The largest earthquake: 2011 Tōhoku earthquake and tsunami, Mj8.4 Mw9.0, March 11, 2011.
- The deadliest earthquake: Great Kantō earthquake, 105,385 deaths, September 1, 1923.

== Political entities ==
- The largest prefecture-level entity: Hokkaidō, 83,455 km².
- The smallest prefecture-level entity: Kagawa, 1,862 km².
  - Ōsaka was once the smallest, but became larger because of the reclamation of the Kansai International Airport.
- The largest municipality: Takayama City, Gifu, 2,179 km². (Larger than Kagawa or Osaka.)
- The largest ward: Aoi Ward, Shizuoka City, Shizuoka, 1,073 km².
- The smallest municipality: Funahashi Village, Toyama, 3.5 km².
- Prefecture-level entity with the largest population: Tokyo, 12,678,395 residents.
- Prefecture-level entity with the smallest population: Tottori, 607,046 residents.
- Municipality with the largest population: Yokohama City, Kanagawa, 3,607,125 residents.
  - Tokyo proper consists of the 23 special districts.
- Town with the largest population: Miyoshi, Aichi, 55,570 residents.
- Village with the largest population: Takizawa, Iwate, 53,523 residents.
- Municipality with the least population: Aogashima Village, Tokyo, 192 residents.
  - Municipality with the least population, excluding those in remote islands: Ōkawa Village, Kōchi. 527 residents.
- City with the least population: Utashinai, Hokkaidō, 5,170 residents.
- Town with the least population: Hayakawa, Yamanashi, 1,479 residents.
- Municipality with the highest population density: Warabi, Saitama. (Also geographically the smallest city.) 13,744 residents per km².
- Municipality with the lowest population density: Hinoemata, Fukushima, 1.6 residents per km².
- Prefecture-level entity with the most municipalities: Hokkaidō, 180 municipalities. (Excluding those in the Northern Territories.)
- Prefecture-level entity with the fewest municipalities: Toyama, 15 municipalities.
- Prefecture-level entity with the most cities: Saitama, 40 cities.
- Prefecture-level entity with the fewest cities: Tottori, 4 cities.
- Prefecture-level entity with the most road bridges: Hokkaidō, 11,770 bridges.
- Prefecture-level entity with the most road tunnels: Ōita, 488 tunnels.
- Municipality with the longest name:
  - In Japanese:
    - Ichikikushikino (いちき串木野), Kagoshima.
    - Kasumigaura (かすみがうら), Ibaraki.
    - Tsukubamirai (つくばみらい), Ibaraki.
  - In Rōmaji: Ichikikushikino, Kagoshima.

== Buildings ==
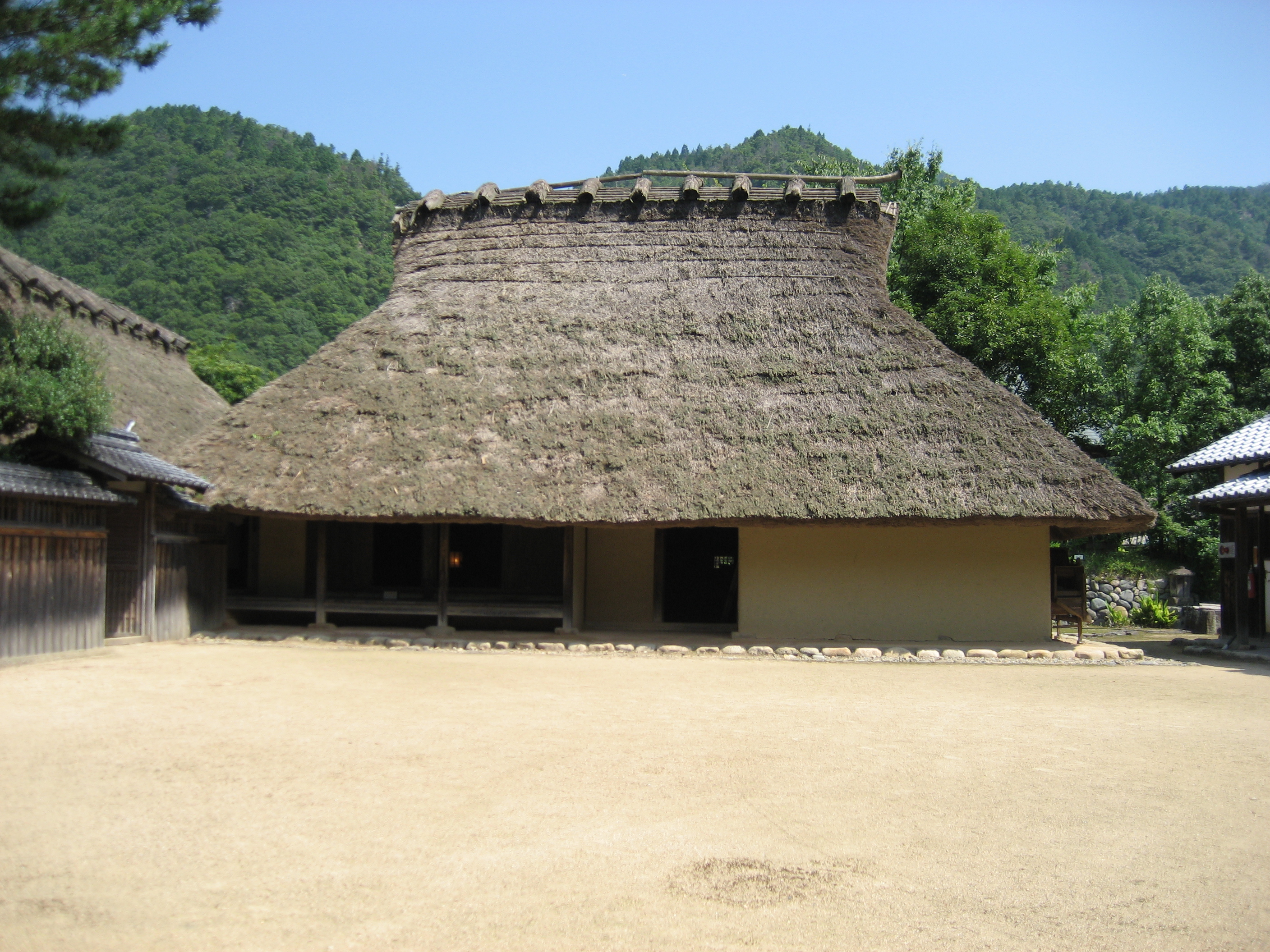
Hakogi Family House, the residence built in 806

- Building with the largest total floor area: JR Central Towers, a part of Nagoya Station, Nagoya, Aichi, 416,565 m².
- The tallest structure: Tokyo Skytree, Sumida, Tokyo, 634 m.
- The tallest building: Azabudai Hills, Minato, Tokyo, 325 m.
- The largest wooden building: Ōdate Jukai Dome, Ōdate, Akita, 178×157×52 m, 24,672 m³.
- The oldest wooden building in the world: The five-story pagoda and kon-dō of Hōryū-ji temple, Ikaruga, Nara. Built around 700.
- The longest wooden bridge in the world: Hōrai Bridge, Shimada, Shizuoka, 897m.
- The oldest private residence: Hakogi Family House, Kōbe, Hyōgo, built in 806.
- The longest bench in the world: The one in Masuhoura coast, Shika, Ishikawa, 460 m.
- Aquarium with the largest water capacity in the world: Okinawa Churaumi Aquarium, Motobu, Okinawa, 7,500 t.
- The oldest community onsen in Japan: Sabakoyu Onsen in Iizaka, Fukushima.

== Transportation ==
=== Aviation ===
- The shortest regular flight route: From Kita-Daitō Airport to Minami-Daitō Airport. The flight takes 3 minutes.
- The longest regular flight route: From New Chitose Airport to Naha Airport. The flight takes 3 hours and 25 minutes.
- Airport with the largest number of users: Haneda Airport, 65 million users per annum. (4th busiest in the world.)

=== Rail transportation ===
- Station with the most users in the world: Shinjuku Station, Shinjuku, Tokyo, 3.22 million users per day.
  - Subway station with the most users: Tokyo Metro Chiyoda Line Ayase Station, Adachi, Tokyo, 490,000 users per day.
- Station with the most trains: Tokyo Station, Chiyoda, Tokyo, 4,000 trains per day.
- Station with the longest name:
  - In Japanese: Tōjiin Ritsumeikan University Station (等持院・立命館大学衣笠キャンパス前駅), Ukyō-ku, Kyoto
  - In Romaji: Minamiaso Mizu-no-Umareru-Sato Hakusui-Kōgen Station, Minamiaso, Kumamoto.
- Station with the shortest name:
  - In Japanese: There are roughly 90 stations with just 1 kanji, including Sakai Station (堺), Kashiwa Station (柏), or Kure Station (呉).
  - In hiragana: Tsu Station (津/つ), Tsu, Mie.
  - In Romaji: Ao Station, Ei Station, Ii Station, Kō Station (Aichi), Kō Station (Tokushima), Oe Station, Ōe Station (Aichi), Ōe Station (Kyōto), and Yū Station.
- The largest number of different stations with a same name: 10, Shiyakusho-mae Stations, namely:
  - Shiyakusho-mae Station (Aichi), Shiyakusho-mae Station (Chiba), Shiyakusho-mae Station (Ehime), Shiyakusho-mae Station (Fukui), Shiyakusho-mae Station (Hiroshima), Shiyakusho-mae Station (Hokkaido), Shiyakusho-mae Station (Kagoshima), Shiyakusho-mae Station (Kumamoto), Shiyakusho-mae Station (Nagano), Shiyakusho-mae Station (Wakayama)
- Station with the most platforms: Tokyo Station, 15 platforms with 30 lines.
- The longest railway line: San'in Main Line, 673.8 km.
- Railway operator with the longest distance: East Japan Railway Company, 7,405 km.
  - Tramway operator with the longest distance: Hiroshima Electric Railway, 35.1 km.
- Railway operator with the shortest distance: Kurama-dera Temple, 0.2 km. (Funicular.)
  - Ordinary railway operator with the shortest distance: Shibayama Railway, 2.2 km.
- The longest railway tunnel in the world: JR Kaikyo Line Seikan Tunnel, 53.85 km.
- The shortest railway tunnel: JR Agatsuma Line Tarusawa Tunnel, 7.2m.
- The longest railway bridge: JR Tōhoku Shinkansen The First Kitakami River Bridge, 3,868m.
- Station with the highest altitude: Komagatake Ropeway Senjōjiki Station, Komagane, Nagano. 2,611m. (Aerial tramway.)
  - Ordinary railway station with the highest altitude: JR Koumi Line Nobeyama Station, Minamimaki, Nagano, 1,346m.
  - Subway station with the highest altitude: Tokyo Metro Ginza Line Shibuya Station, a third floor of the building.
- Station with the lowest altitude: JR Kaikyō Line Yoshioka-Kaitei Station, Fukushima, Hokkaidō, -149.5m. (Accessible from the railway line only.)
  - Ordinary station with the lowest altitude: Toei Ōedo Line Roppongi Station, Minato, Tokyo, -42m.
  - Overground station with the lowest altitude: Kintetsu Nagoya Line Kintetsu-Yatomi Station, Yatomi, Aichi, -0.9m.
- Railway operator with the most different express services: West Japan Railway Company, 13 services. (Limited Express, Express, Liner, Special Rapid, Airport Rapid, Kishūji Rapid, Tanbaji Rapid, Yamatoji Rapid, Miyakoji Rapid, Rapid, B Rapid, Regional Rapid, Local.)
- Station with the most different express services: Shinjuku Station, 15 services. (Special Express, Semi Special Express, Rapid Express, Express, Tama Express, Semi Express, Section Semi Express, Commuter Special Rapid, Chūō Special Rapid, Oume Special Rapid, Special Rapid, Commuter Rapid, Rapid, Liner, Local.)
- Station with the least opening days: JR Yosan Line Tsushimanomiya Station, Mitoyo, Kagawa, opens 2 days a year.
- Passenger train service with the longest distance: Twilight Express, from Sapporo Station to Osaka Station, 1,508.7 km(Closed in March 2016, to make way for Shinkansen).
- Freight train service with the longest distance: Rapid Freight 3098-2071 Train (from Sapporo Freight Terminal to Fukuoka Freight Terminal), and Rapid Freight 2070-3099 Train (the opposite direction), both 2,128 km.
- Monorail with the longest distance in the world: Osaka Monorail, 23.8 km.
- Suspended monorail with the longest distance in the world: Chiba Urban Monorail, 15.2 km.
- The fastest train in service: JR East Tōhoku Shinkansen E5 series, 320 km/h.
  - The fastest train in service, excluding Shinkansen: Hokuetsu Express Hokuhoku Line, 160 km/h.
  - The fastest subway in service: Tokyo Metro Tōzai Line, 100 km/h.
- The longest distance between two stations: JR Central Tōkaidō Shinkansen, from Maibara Station to Kyōto Station, 68.1 km.
  - The longest distance between two stations, excluding Shinkansen: JR Hokkaidō Sekishō Line, from Shin-Yūbari Station to Shimukappu Station, 34.3 km.
- The shortest distance between two stations: Matsuura Railway Nishi-Kyūshū Line, from Sasebo-Chūō Station to Naka-Sasebo Station, 200m.

=== Road ===
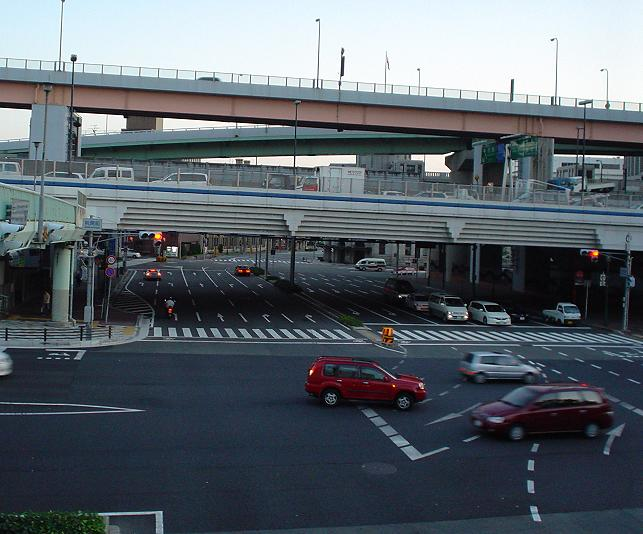
The "full view" of National Route 174, the shortest highway

- The longest expressway: Tōhoku Expressway, 679.5 km.
- The longest national highway: Route 4, 743.7 km.
  - The longest national highway, in the official count: Route 58, 857.6 km. (Only 255.5 km is on land.)
- The shortest national highway: Route 174, 187m.
- The shortest prefectural road: Hiroshima Prefectural Route 204, length 7m. (Width 14m.)
- The widest road: Ōsaka Chūō Loop Line, 122m at its widest point.
- The longest road tunnel: Kan-Etsu Tunnel, 11,055m.
- The longest road bridge: Tokyo Bay Aqua-Line, Tokyo Bay Aqua-Bridge, 4424m.
- The longest suspension bridge in the world: Akashi Kaikyō Bridge, 1,991m.
- Road with the highest altitude: Hida Nokkoshi mountain path, Gifu and Nagano, 3,020m.
  - Road with the highest altitude, accessible by normal vehicles: Ōdarumi Path, Nagano and Yamanashi, 2,360m.
- Road with the lowest altitude: Tokyo Bay Aqua-Line, Tokyo Bay Aqua-Tunnel, -60m.

=== Bus ===
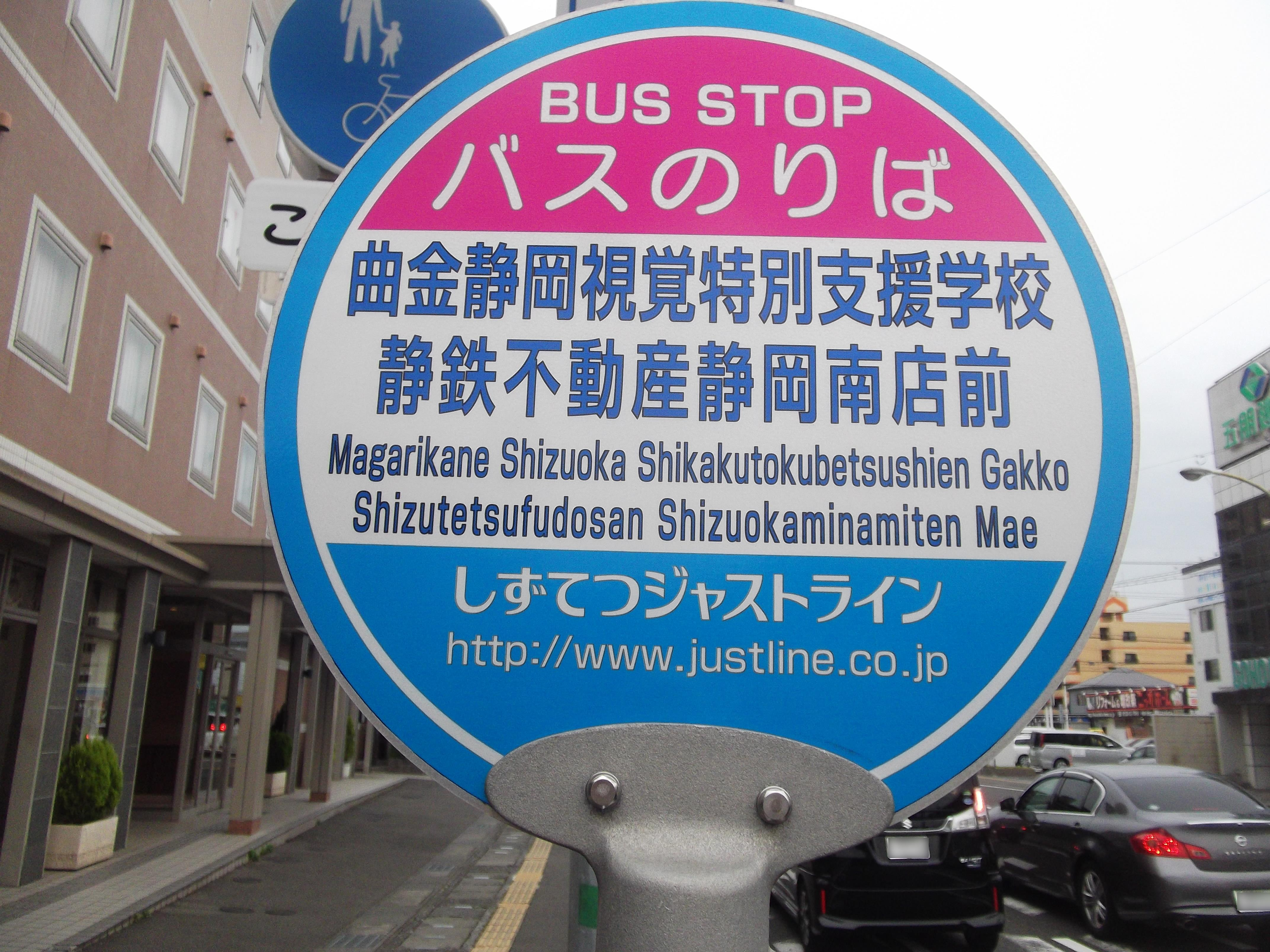
Magarikane-Shizuoka-Shikakutokubetsushien-Gakko-Shizutetsufudosan-Shizuokaminamiten-Mae

- Bus operator with the most buses: Nishi-Nippon Railroad, approx. 2,000 buses. (2,900 buses by the entire group.)
- Bus operator with the least buses: Onigashima Kankō Jidōsha in Megijima Island, Kagawa, 2 buses.
- Bus line with the longest distance: Hakata-gō, from Shinjuku, Tokyo to Fukuoka, Fukuoka. Approx. 1,150 km, for 14 hours and 20 minutes.
- Bus stop with the longest name: Magarikane-Shizuoka-Shikakutokubetsushien-Gakko-Shizutetsufudosan-Shizuokaminamiten-Mae (曲金静岡視覚特別支援学校静鉄不動産静岡南店前, "Magarikane, Shizuoka Special Needs Education School for the Visually Impaired, Shizutetsu Real Estate Shizuoka-Minami Shop"), Shizutetsu-Justline, Suruga-ku, Shizuoka-city, Shizuoka.

== Literature ==
- The best selling book, excluding comics: Totto-chan, the Little Girl at the Window, Tetsuko Kuroyanagi, more than 7.5 million copies.
- Series novel with the most volumes: Guin Saga series by Kaoru Kurimoto, main series 108 volumes, spinoffs 20 volumes, still ongoing.
- Book that needed the longest preparation: Dainihonshi (The history of Great Japan), which the group of authors began writing in 1657, completed in 1906.
- Serialized novel with the most episodes: The Human Revolution by Daisaku Ikeda, 4,955 episodes as of November 18, 2006, including The New Human Revolution, its sequel. Still ongoing.
- The shortest poem in the world: Hi e yamu (陽へ病む) by Ōhashi Raboku, 4 Japanese letters.
- Newspaper with the largest circulation in the world: Yomiuri Shimbun, 14,323,781 copies.
- Freepaper with the largest circulation in the world: Pado, 12,919,300 copies.

=== Manga ===
- The best selling comic: One Piece by Eiichiro Oda, with 480,000,000 copies printed worldwide as of February 4, 2021.
- Comic with the most collected volumes: Kochira Katsushika-ku Kameari Kōen-mae Hashutsujo by Osamu Akimoto with 200.
- Serialized comic with the most episodes: Jankenpon by Izumi Shōji, 15770+ episodes (ongoing).
- Serialized comic with the longest span: Sennin Buraku by Kō Kojima, serialized from 1956–2014.

== Entertainment ==
- Highest selling music act and band: B'z. More than 82 million records. (according to Oricon)
- Highest selling solo artist: Ayumi Hamasaki. More than 50 million records. (according to Oricon)
- Biggest selling single: Subete No Hito No Kokoro Ni Hana Wo by Shoukichi Kina. More than 30 million.
- Best-selling album: First Love by Hikaru Utada.
- Best-selling album by a male solo artist: Love by Ryuichi Kawamura
- Most Number 1 recorded hits by a band (singles, albums, DVD/VHS): B'z, Singles: 49, Albums: 25, EPs: 3, DVD/VHS: 12
- Most Number 1 recorded hits by a solo artist (singles, albums, DVD): Ayumi Hamasaki, Singles: 41, Albums: 16, DVD: 10
- First artist to top all three Oricon Charts (Singles, albums, DVDs) in the same week: Ayumi Hamasaki
- Musician who dominated Oricon Top 100 chart with multiple songs in the same week: Southern All Stars, 44 songs.
- Musician who dominated Oricon Top 10 chart with multiple songs in the same week: B'z, 9 songs.
- Only person with a number one album for 13 consecutive years: Ayumi Hamasaki.
- Single which took the longest time to become Oricon No.1: Katte ni Sinbad by Southern All Stars, released on June 25, 1978, Oricon No.1 in July 2003.
- Musician with the most songs played in a single live performance: Ichirō Mizuki, 1,000 songs, sung for 24 hours.
- Largest-ticketed concert ever held by a single act: Glay Expo'99 Survival, by the band Glay, 200,000 people.
- Biggest selling video game software: Super Mario Bros., 6,810,000 copies domestically.
- The longest-running television program: Kyō no Dekigoto ("Today's News"), Nippon Television, from 1954 to 2006.
- The most-watched television program: Boxing Fly Weight World Match, Yoshio Shirai versus Pascual Perez, 1954, 96.1% according to Dentsu.
- The highest-grossing film: Demon Slayer: Kimetsu no Yaiba the Movie: Mugen Train, ¥38,78 billion (ongoing).
- Movie series with the most installments in the world: Otoko wa Tsurai yo series.
- Movies with the largest credited cast in the world: Kamen Rider 555: Paradise Lost, 4070 members.
- Pop group with the most members: AKB48, a total of 90 members

== Others ==
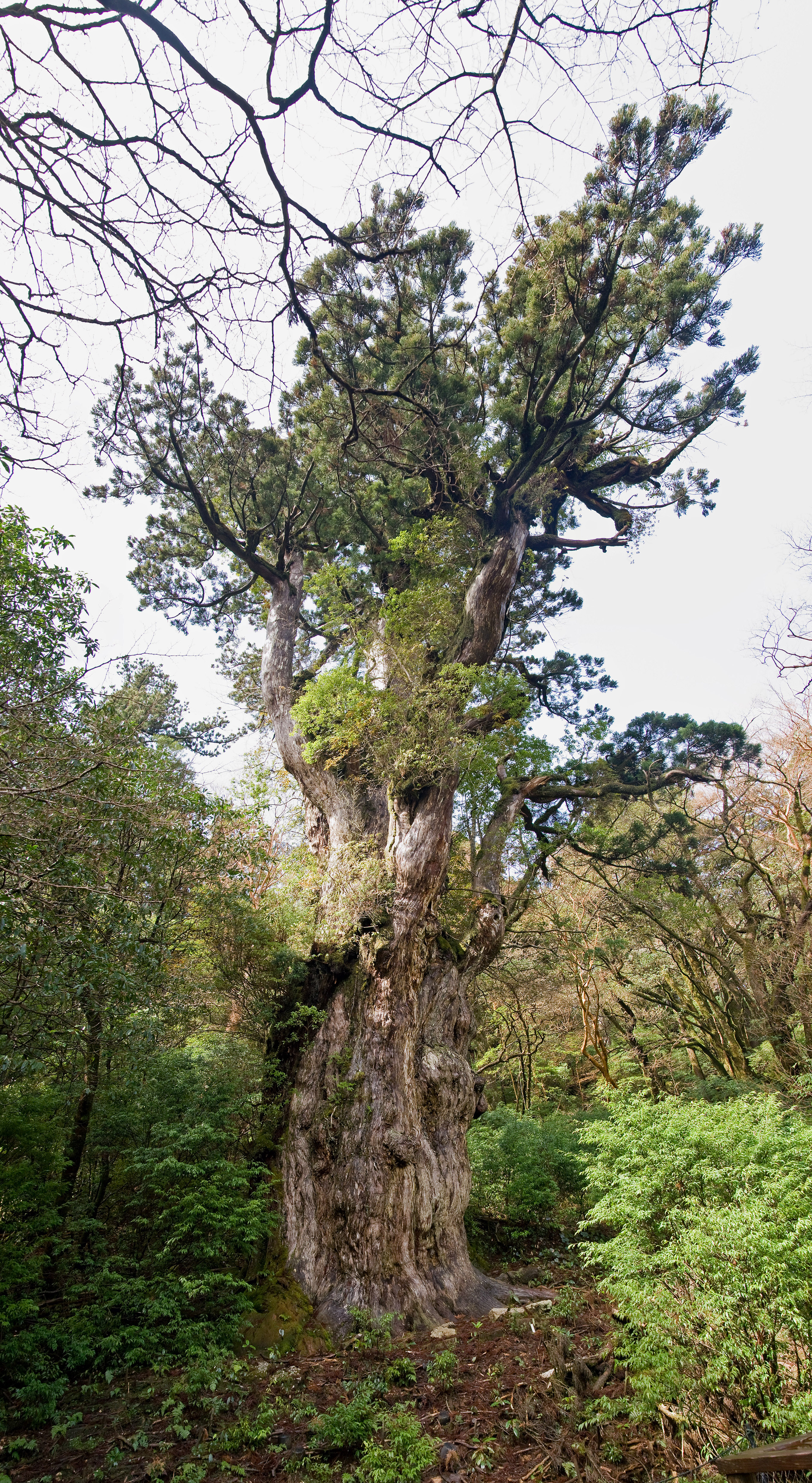
Jōmon Sugi, the oldest living being in Japan

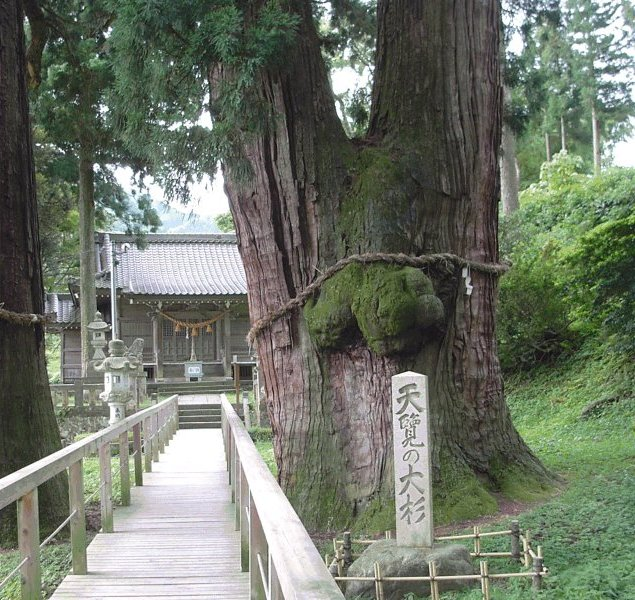
Great sugi of Kayano at Yamanaka Onsen in Kaga, Ishikawa Prefecture, Japan

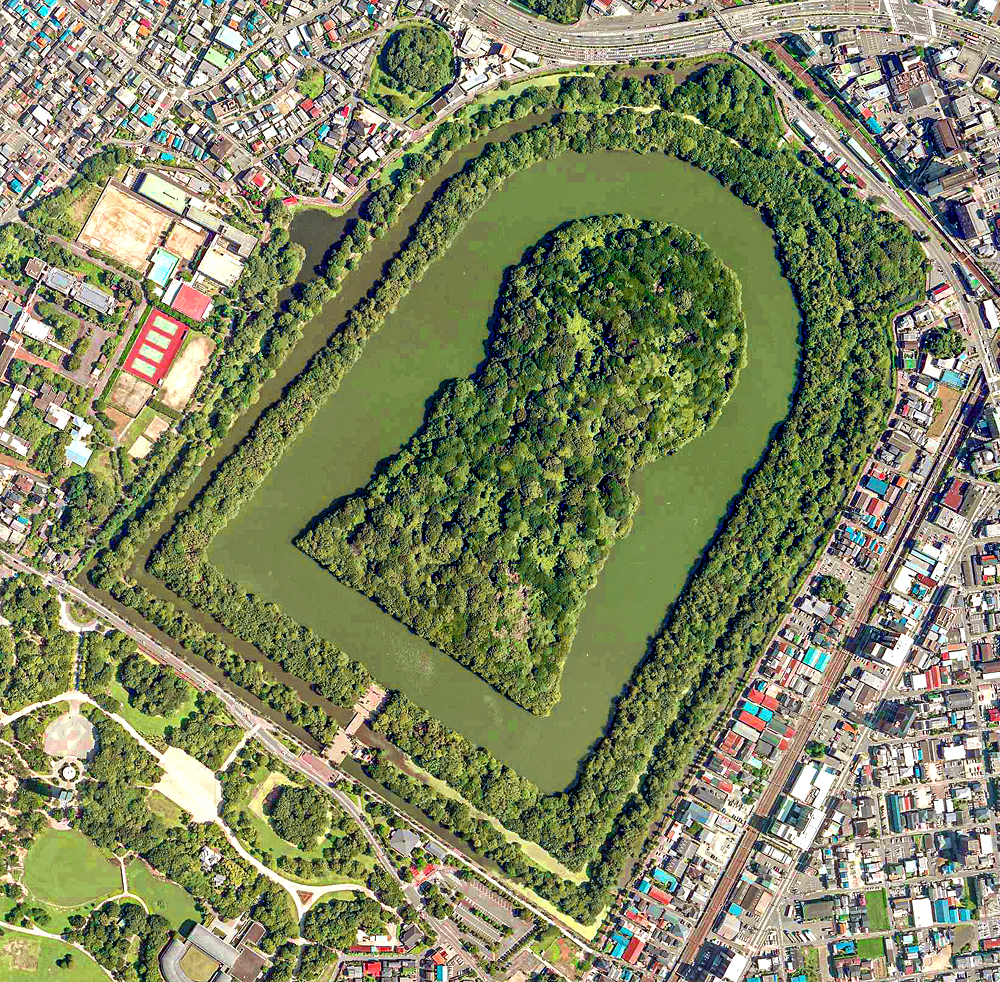
Nintokuryō Tomb is the largest tomb in the world.

- The oldest living being naturally grown: Jōmon Sugi, the cryptomeria tree in Yakushima Island, Kagoshima, more than 2,170 to 7,200 years old.
- The great sugi of Kayano, Cryptomeria, tree at Yamanaka Onsen in Kaga, Ishikawa Prefecture, Japan. Professor of Tokyo Imperial University estimated the age of the tree to be 2,300 years in 1928.
- The oldest living being deemed planted by human: Sugi no Osugi, the cryptomeria tree in Otoyo, Kochi with an estimated age of about 3,000 years.
- The oldest hotel in the world: Hōshi, Komatsu, Ishikawa, opened in 718.
- The largest tomb in the world: Nintokuryō Tomb, Sakai, Ōsaka, 46ha. See Daisen Kofun, as this is the official name of the complex of tombs considered the burial place of Emperor Nintoku (Kofun is Japanese for this type of burial mound).
- The tallest statue: Ushiku Daibutsu, Ushiku, Ibaraki, 120m.
- The largest screen in the world: Turf Vision of Tokyo Racecourse, Fuchū, Tokyo, 11.2x66.4m, 743.68m^{2}.
- The shortest festival: Enrei-no-Onodachi Memorial Festival, Okaya, Nagano. It takes approx. 5 seconds to complete the festival.
- The company with the longest history in the world: Kongō Gumi, from 578 till 2006.
- The oldest political party still active: Japanese Communist Party, from 1922. The only surviving Japanese political party from the pre-war times.
- The fastest battery electric vehicle in the world: Eliica, 370 km/h.
- Best selling motorcycle in the world: Honda Super Cub, more than 50 million.
- The shortest escalator in the world: the one in Okadaya More-s, Kawasaki, Kanagawa, 5 seconds a ride.
- Theme park with the 3rd most visitors in the world: Tokyo Disneyland, Urayasu, Chiba.
- Roller coaster with the longest track in the world: Steel Dragon 2000, Nagashima Spa Land, Kuwana, Mie.
- Roller coaster with the most inversions in the world: Ējanaika, Fuji-Q Highland, Fujiyoshida, Yamanashi.
- The most expensive coin regularly used in the world: 500 yen coin.
- The most complex character in the world: 龘. Taito is a rare 84 stroke character, made of two kanji ("cloud" (雲) and "dragon" (龘)) repeated three times each. It means "the appearance of a dragon in flight". It has also been pronounced daito (だいと) and otodo (おとど).
- Law with the longest name: 平成十三年九月十一日のアメリカ合衆国において発生したテロリストによる攻撃等に対応して行われる国際連合憲章の目的達成のための諸外国の活動に対して我が国が実施する措置及び関連する国際連合決議等に基づく人道的措置に関する特別措置法, roughly meaning "Special measures law concerning the measures which our nation will enforce for the activities that foreign nations take to accomplish the objective of the charter of the United Nations corresponding the attacks by terrorists occurred on September 11, Heisei 13, on the United States of America, as well as the humanitarian measures based on the related decisions of the United Nations and other factors". Usually called テロ対策特別措置法 (special anti-terrorism law).
- The longest song: Ishizaka Masao Hitori Tabi-shite — Zenkoku Waga-machi Ondo ("Ishizaka Masao Travelling Alone — All Japan 'Our Towns' Ondo"), 3355 chorus in total.
- The shortest Citizen's Charter: 和 (Wa, "Harmony"), Katano, Ōsaka.
- The longest address: Ōaza Tobishimashinden Aza Takenogō Yotare Minaminowari, Tobishima Village, Ama District, Aichi Prefecture. (愛知県海部郡飛島村大字飛島新田字竹之郷ヨタレ南ノ割)
- The shortest address: Ro 1, Asahi City, Chiba Prefecture. (千葉県旭市ロ1番地)
- The shortest place name: O (績), Omi, Nagano.
