= Houkisugi at Nakagawa =

2000-year-old Japanese cedar tree

Coordinates: 35°27′30″N 139°03′34″E

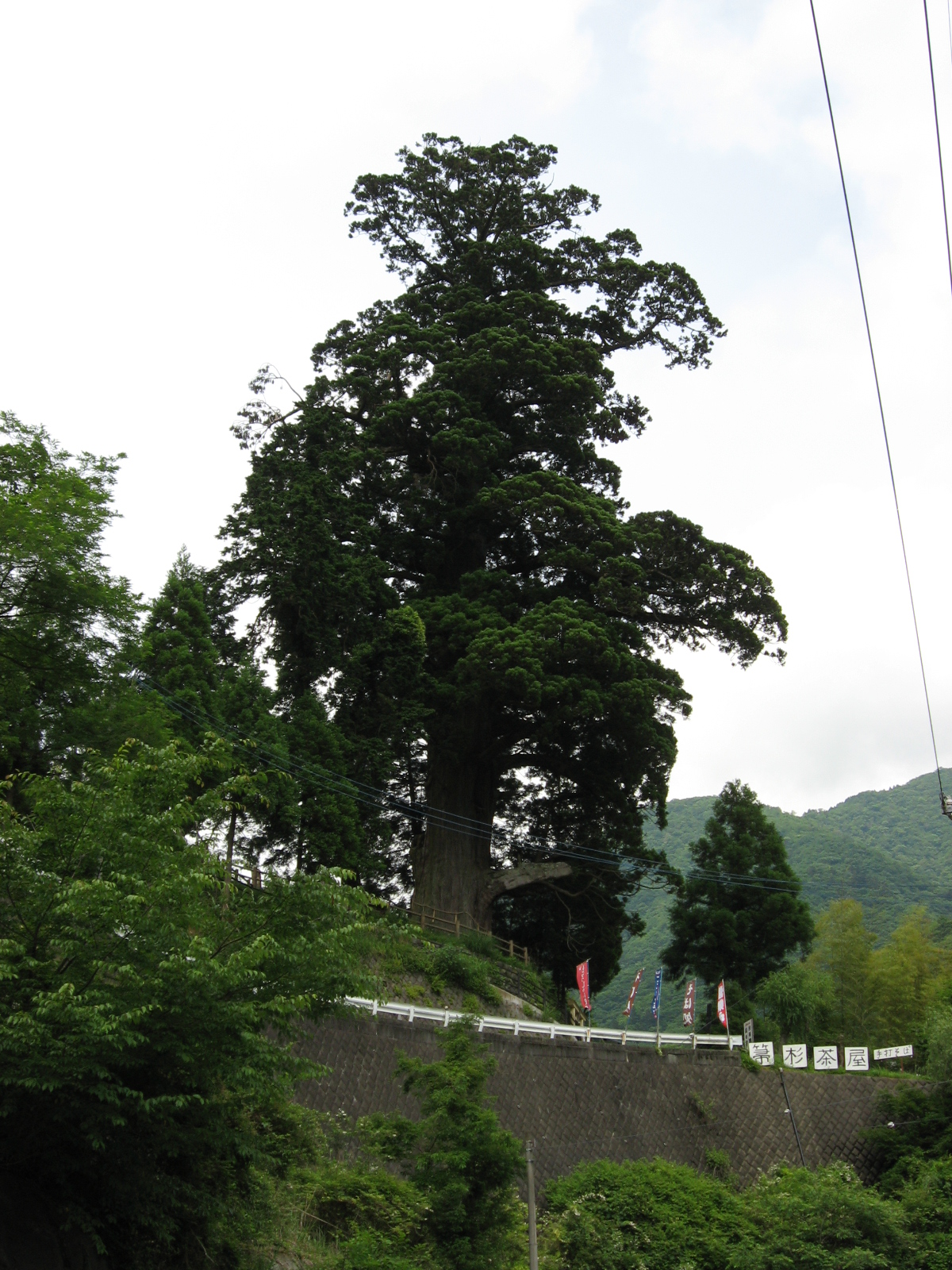
Houkisugi at Nakagawa, photograph taken in June, 2007

Houkisugi or Hōkisugi at Nakagawa (箒スギ) is a 2000-year-old Japanese cedar (Cryptomeria) at Nakagawa Settlement, Yamakita town, Ashigarakami District, Kanagawa Prefecture, Japan.

The tree was revered by locals because it prevented a great fire from spreading in 1904. There is still visible fire damage on the tree. On July 12, 1972, it stopped a great landslide and lessened the damage during heavy rainfall in the Tanzawa Mountains.

It was designated as a national Natural Monument on March 26, 1934.

== Measurements ==
Houkisugi at Nakagawa is estimated to be more than 2000 years old. Its height is about 45 metres (148 ft). The circumference at head height is 12 metres (39 ft). The circumference around the root is 18 metres (59 ft).

== Etymology ==
There are two views about the origin of the term "Houki:" 1) The place was earlier called Houkizawa or 2) the tree is Japanese Broom shaped. Broom is Houki in Japanese.

== History ==
In the Edo era, the felling of trees such as cryptomeria, Chamaecyparis obtusa, Zelkova serrata, firs (Abies), Tsuga sieboldii, or Torreya nucifera was prohibited. After the Meiji Restoration, trees which were around the cryptomeria tree were cut down, and the area became a Japanese tea plantation. The local people held shinto ceremonies at the local guardian shrine called Suga Shrine on July 12 and October 13 (Festival) thanking the sacred tree. They cleaned the shrine every month. In the summer of 2003, a branch of the tree was broken but the tree was restored to health with the treatment by an arborist.

== Recognition ==
- In 1990, this tree was selected as one among the New Japan Noted 100 Trees by Yomiuri Shimbun.
- This tree was selected as one among the 100 Noted Trees in Kanagawa Prefecture.
- In 2001, this tree was selected as one in Kanagawa Prefecture Future Heritage by Kanagawa Prefecture and Kanagawa Shimbun.

== See also ==
- Jōmon Sugi
- Sacred Nagi Tree of Kumano Hayatama Taisha
- Great sugi of Kayano
- List of individual trees
- List of oldest trees
