= Butsubutsu River =

Shortest river in Japan, located in Nachikatsuura

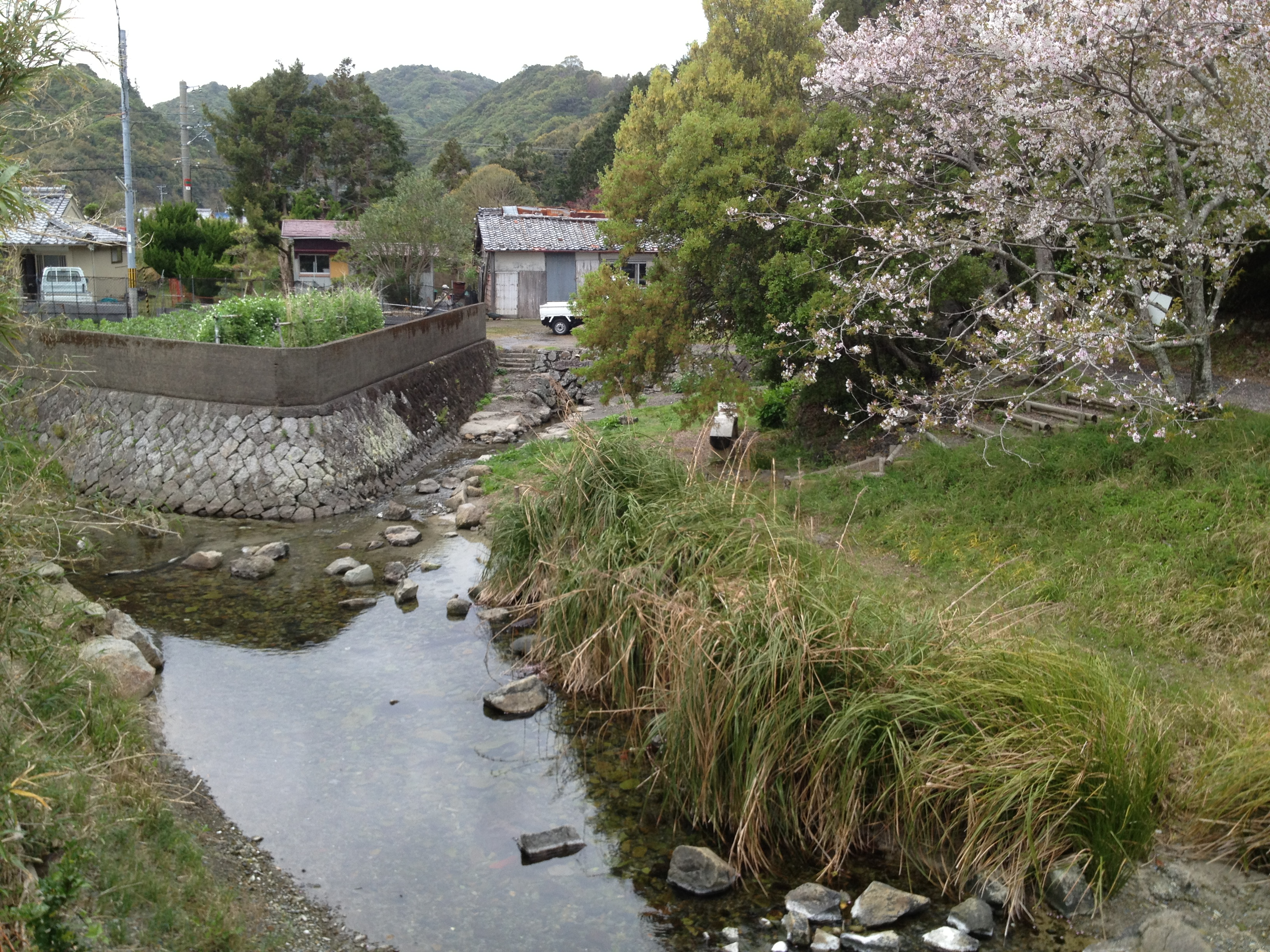
- The Narrow river in the back of the center is the Butsubutsu river

- Location within Japan

Location
- Country: Japan
- Prefecture: Wakayama
- Town: Nachikatsuura

Physical characteristics
- Mouth: Koshira River
  - coordinates: 33°34′19″N 135°54′58″E
- Length: 0.0135 km (0.0084 mi)
- Width
  - average: 1 m (3 ft 3 in)

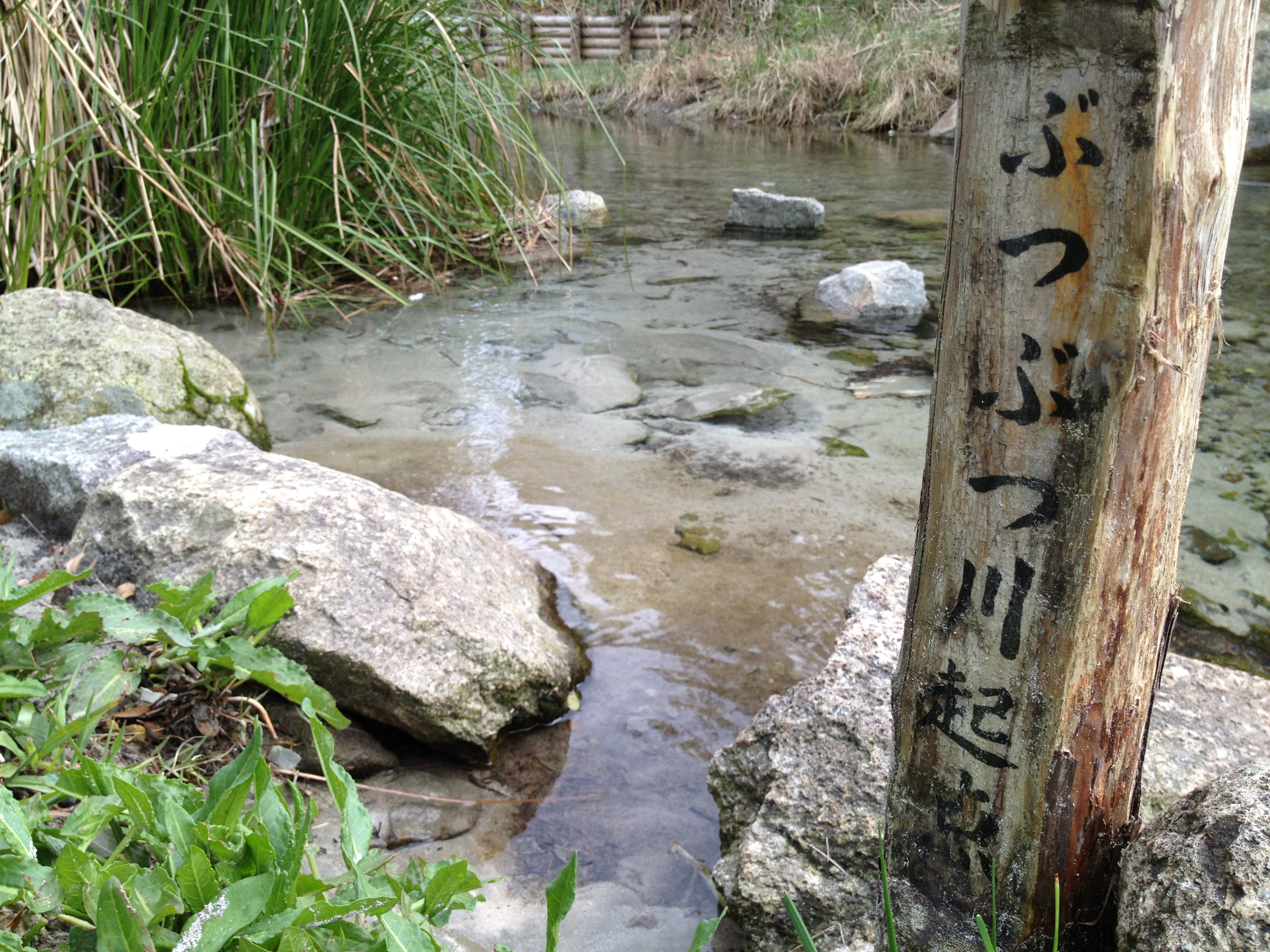
Start of the river

The Butsubutsu River (Japanese: ぶつぶつ川) is a second-class river that flows through the Konoshiro district of Nachikatsuura Town, Higashimuro District, Wakayama Prefecture (Japanese: 和歌山県). The total length is 13.5 meters (also: 44 ft) and the river width is around 1 meter. With the designation of a second-class river in 2008, it became the shortest river in Japan under the River Law.

The rivers known to be short before that were the Honbetsu River, which is the same second-class river and flows through Shimamaki Village, Shimamaki County, Hokkaido, and the Shiono River, which is a quasi-river with a total length of 15 m and flows through Mamurogawa Town, Yamagata Prefecture.

== Summary ==
It is a tributary that flows into the Koshira River, and its water source is spring water. In "Shimosato Village Magazine" (1918) before the merger, it was written that the spring springs from the bottom of the river, which is commonly referred to as "butsubutsu", and it is said that the name comes from the appearance of bubbles popping out. .. Residents in the area still use it to wash drinking water and food, and when the water was cut off due to flooding in 2011, people who asked for drinking water lined up.

== See also ==
- Shinano river - The longest river in the Japan
- Hidaka river - The longest second-river in the Japan. This is also in Wakayama Prefecture.
- List of records of Japan

== External links (Japanese) ==
- ぶつぶつ川 - Wakayama Thurlist
- ぶつぶつ川 - 和歌山県河川課
- ぶつぶつ川 - 和歌山県広報課
- ぶつぶつ川 （日本一短い川） - 和歌山県那智勝浦町
- ぶつぶつ川（ぶつぶつがわ） - 地域の人がすすめる熊野古道の新たな魅力100選
