= Sugi no Osugi =

Individual Japanese cedar tree

Coordinates: 33.755°N 133.6625°E

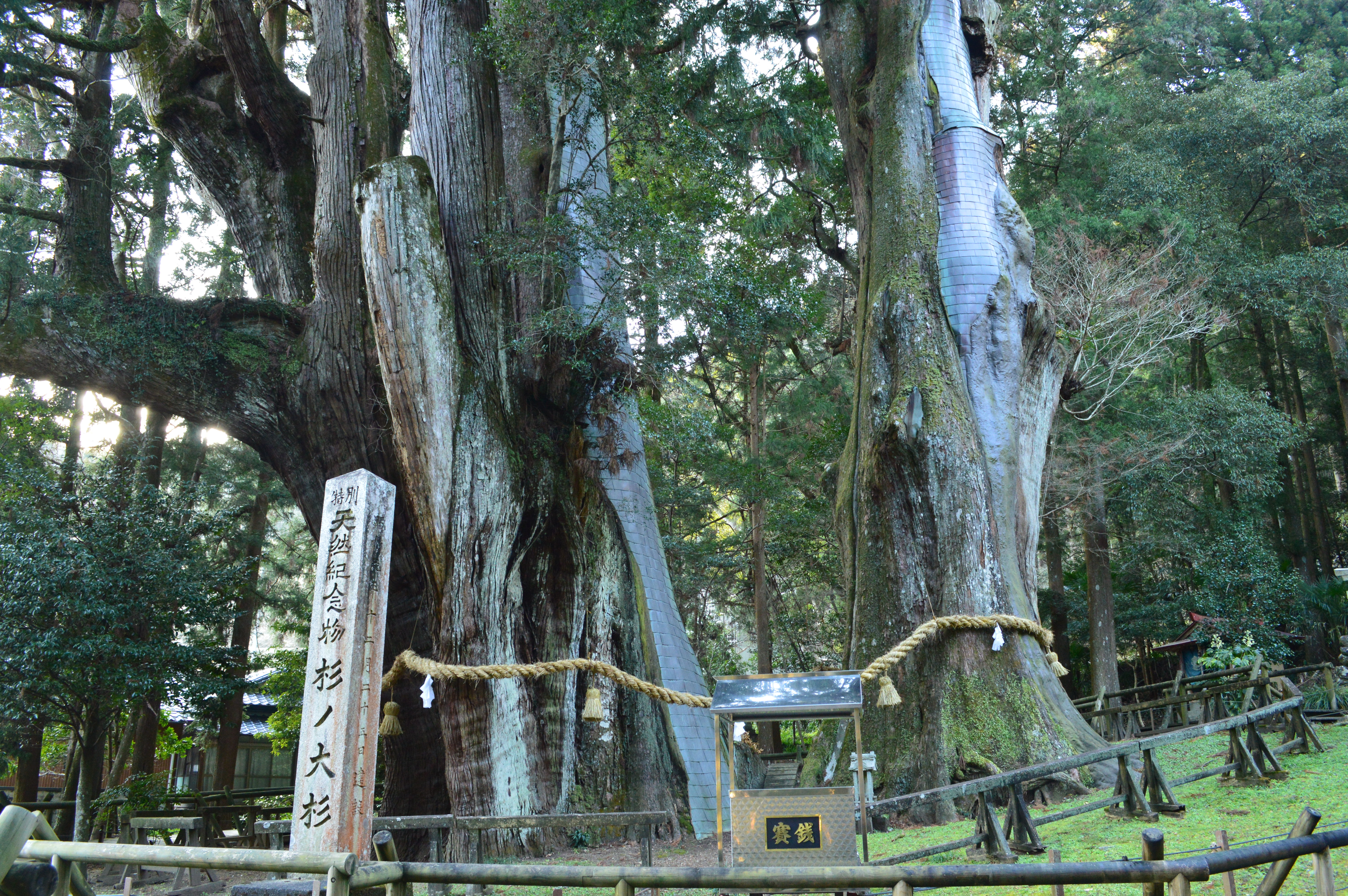
Sugi no Osugi

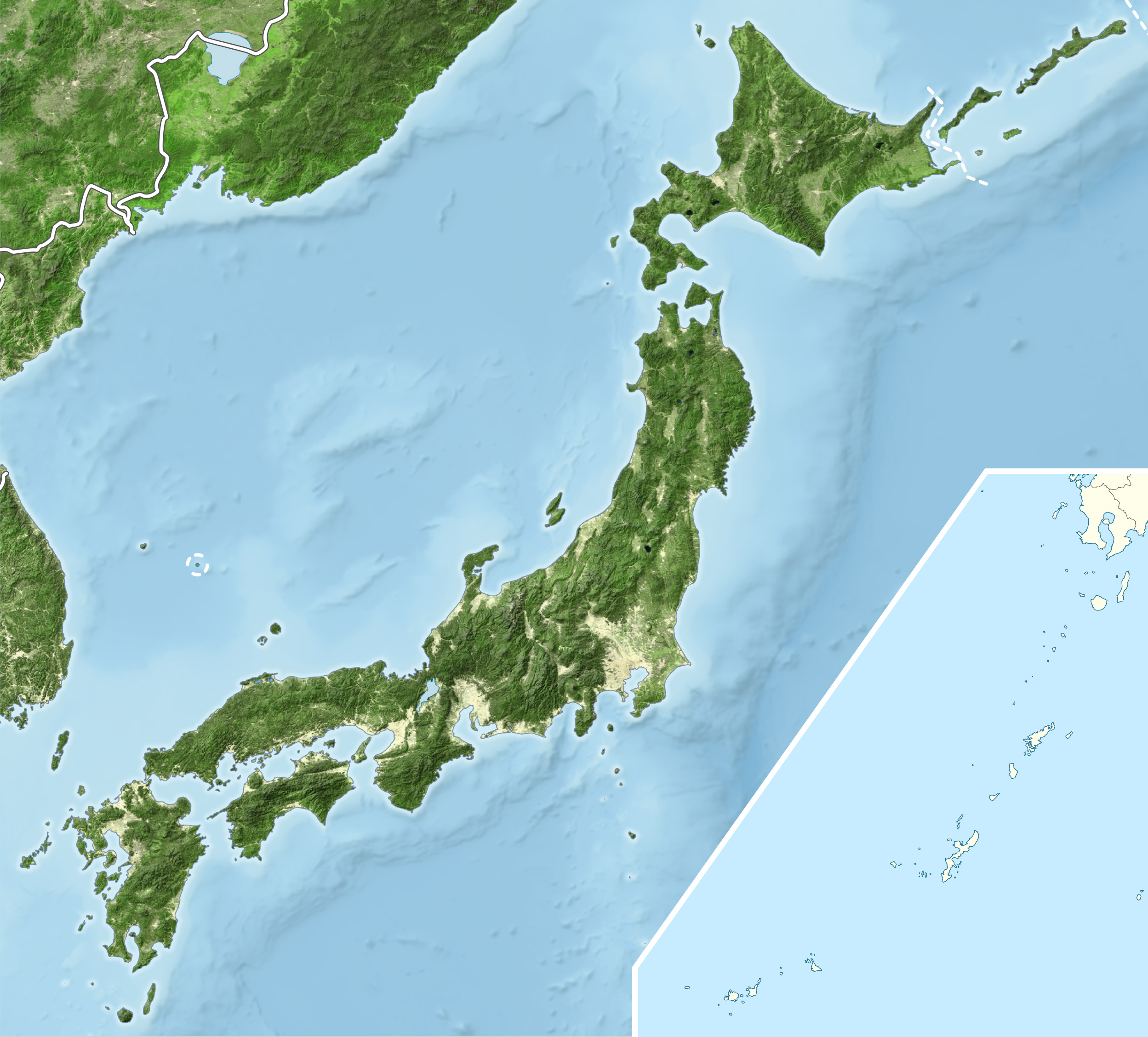
Location of Sugi no Osugi

Sugi no Osugi (杉の大スギ), also known as "Osugi-san" by locals, is the world's tallest Japanese Cedar (Cryptomeria japonica) and is said to be over 3000 years old. It is located within the grounds of Yasaka Jinja in Ōtoyo, Kōchi Prefecture on Shikoku island in Japan.

== General description ==
Sugi no Osugi actually consists of two separate trees, “Minami Osugi” (“South Giant Cedar”), and “Kita Osugi” (“North Giant Cedar”) merged at the roots. As such it is sometimes collectively referred to as “Meoto Sugi” (“Wedded Cedar”). Minami Osugi's circumference is about 20 m (66 ft) at the base with a height of 60 m (200 ft), Kita Osugi has a circumference of about 16.5 m (54 ft) and is approximately 57 m (187 ft) tall. Based upon legends of its planting by Susanoo-no-Mikoto, Sugi no Osugi's estimated age is said to be over 3000 years old.

== Notable events ==
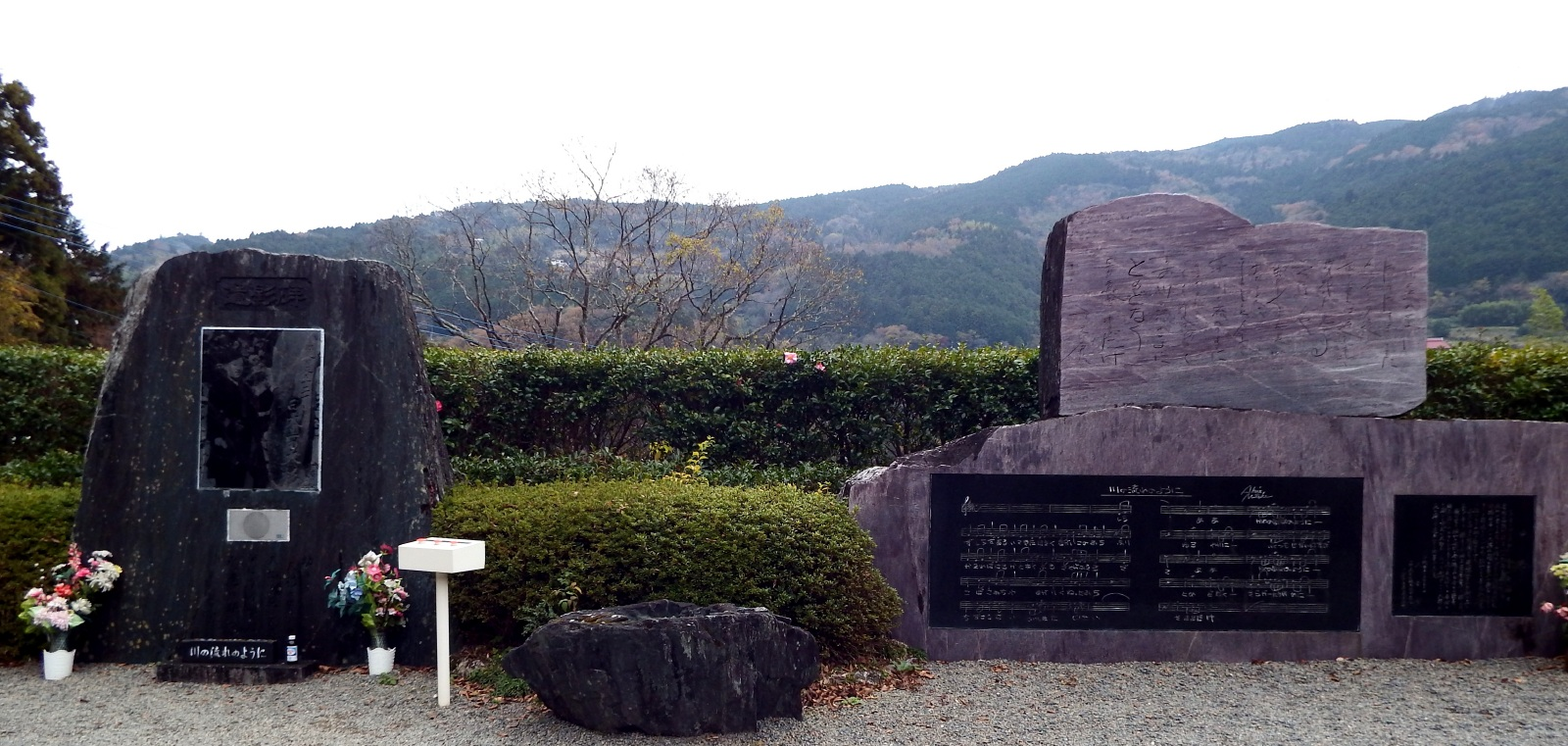
Memorial to Hibari Misora.

- In 1947, a 10-year old Hibari Misora was involved in a serious bus collision in Ōtoyo, Kōchi. While recovering from injuries she stayed in the town and reportedly visited Sugi no Osugi and wished to become a famous singer. She returned to Tokyo where she began her recording career in 1949 at age 12.
- In 1952, Sugi no Osugi was recognised by the government as a special national monument.

== See also ==
- List of individual trees
- List of oldest trees
- List of records of Japan
- Great sugi of Kayano
- Jōmon Sugi

== Sources ==
- This article incorporates material from the article 杉の大スギ (Sugi no Osugi) in the Japanese Wikipedia, retrieved on January 21, 2016.
