= Shiyakusho-mae Station =

Shiyakusho-mae Station is the name of nine train stations in Japan:

- Shiyakusho-mae Station (Aichi)
- Shiyakusho-mae Station (Chiba)
- Shiyakusho-mae Station (Ehime)
- Shiyakusho-mae Station (Hiroshima)
- Shiyakusho-mae Station (Hokkaido)
- Shiyakusho-mae Station (Kagoshima)
- Shiyakusho-mae Station (Kumamoto)
- Shiyakushomae Station (Nagano)
- Shiyakusho-mae Station (Wakayama)

Shiyakusho-mae Station is also a former name of following train station:

- Fukui Castle Ruins-daimyomachi Station
