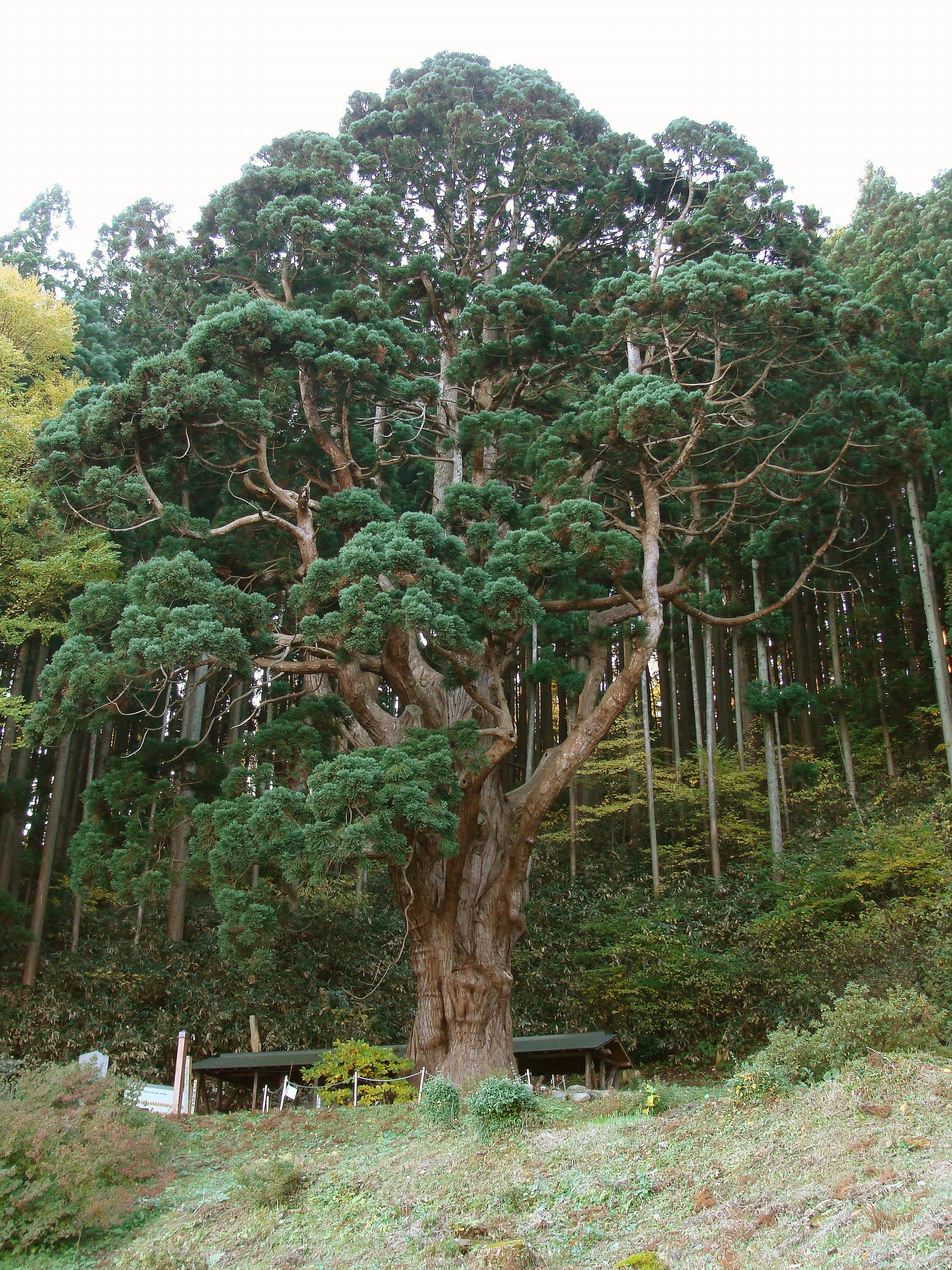
- Old tree (35m) in Fukaura, northern Honshu

Conservation status
- Near Threatened (IUCN 3.1)

Scientific classification
- Kingdom: Plantae
- Clade: Tracheophytes
- Clade: Gymnosperms
- Division: Pinophyta
- Class: Pinopsida
- Order: Cupressales
- Family: Cupressaceae
- Subfamily: Taxodioideae
- Genus: Cryptomeria; D.Don
- Species: C. japonica

Binomial name
- Cryptomeria japonica (L.f.) D.Don

Synonyms
- Synonyms list: Cryptomeria araucarioides Henkel & W.Hochst.; Cryptomeria compacta Beissn.; Cryptomeria elegans Jacob-Makoy; Cryptomeria fortunei Hooibr. ex Billain; Cryptomeria generalis E.H.L.Krause; Cryptomeria kawaii Hayata; Cryptomeria lobbiana Billain; Cryptomeria lobbii (Carrière) Lavallée; Cryptomeria mairei (H.Lév.) Nakai; Cryptomeria mucronata Beissn.; Cryptomeria nana Lindl. & Gordon; Cryptomeria nigricans Carrière; Cryptomeria pungens Beissn.; Cryptomeria variegata Beissn.; Cryptomeria viridis Beissn.; Cupressus japonica Thunb. ex L.f.; Cupressus mairei H.Lév.; Schubertia japonica (Thunb. ex L.f.) Jacques; Schubertia japonicum (Thunb. ex L. f.) Brongn.; Taxodium japonicum (Thunb. ex L.f.) Brongn.

= Cryptomeria =

Genus of conifer in the cypress family

Cryptomeria (literally "hidden parts") is a monotypic genus of conifer in the cypress family Cupressaceae. It includes only one species, Cryptomeria japonica (syn. Cupressus japonica L.f.). It is considered to be endemic to Japan, where it is known as Sugi (杉). The tree is also called Japanese cedar or Japanese redwood in English. It has been extensively introduced, and cultivated for wood production on the Azores and elsewhere.

== Description ==
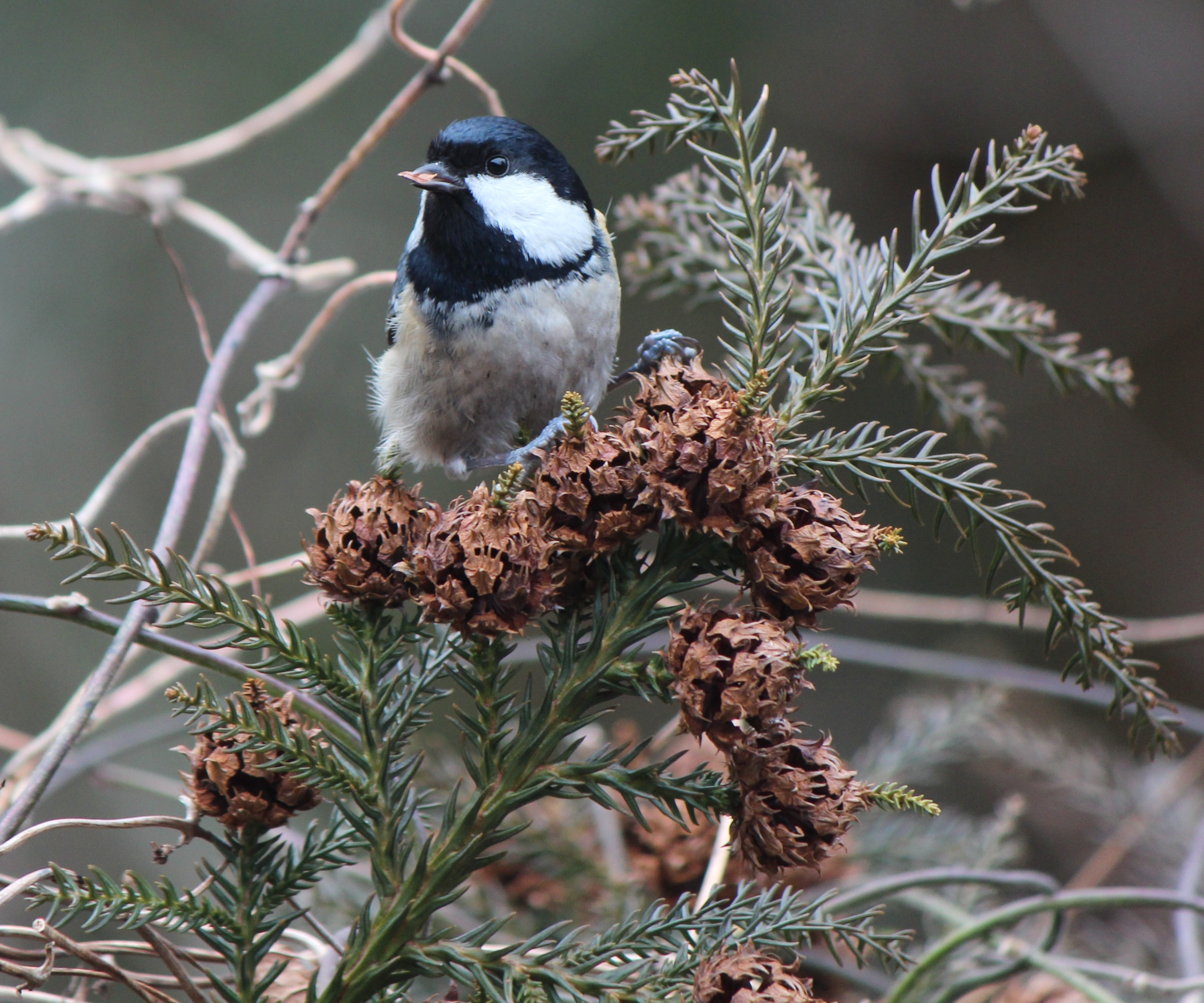
Foliage and cones, with a coal tit taking a seed; Japan

Cryptomeria is a very large coniferous tree, reaching up to 60 m (200 ft) tall and 4 m (13 ft) trunk diameter, with red-brown bark which peels in vertical strips. The leaves are arranged spirally, needle-like, 0.5–1 cm (1/4–3/8 in) long; and the seed cones globular, 1–2 cm (1/2–3/4 in) diameter with about 20–40 scales. It is superficially similar to the related giant sequoia (Sequoiadendron giganteum), from which it can be differentiated by the longer leaves (under 0.5 cm or 1/4 in in the giant sequoia) and smaller cones (4–6 cm or 1 1/2–2 1/4 in in the giant sequoia), and the harder bark on the trunk (thick, soft and spongy in giant sequoia). Prior to 1916, the sylvics expert E.H.Wilson measured a sugi at the village called "Sugi", Tosa Prefecture, Shikoku Island, Japan, which measured 50 m (160 ft) in height, and 25 m (82 ft) in girth at breast height.

== Endemism ==
Old-growth tree in primary forest on Yakushima, southern Japan

Sugi has been cultivated in China for so long that it is frequently thought to be native there. Forms selected for ornament and timber production long ago in China have been described as a distinct variety Cryptomeria japonica var. sinensis (or even a distinct species, Cryptomeria fortunei), but they do not differ from the full range of variation found in the wild in Japan, and there is no definite evidence the species ever occurred wild in China. Genetic analysis of the most famous Chinese population, on Tianmu Mountain, containing trees estimated to be nearly 1000 years old, supports the hypothesis that the population originates from an introduction.

== Biology ==
Cryptomeria grows in forests on deep, well-drained soils subject to warm, moist conditions, and it is fast-growing under these conditions. It is intolerant of poor soils and cold, drier climates.

It is used as a food plant by the larvae of some moths of the genus Endoclita including E. auratus, E. punctimargo and E. undulifer. Sugi (and hinoki) pollen is a major cause of hay fever in Japan.

== Fossil record ==
The earliest fossil record of Cryptomeria are descriptions based on vegetative organs of †Cryptomeria kamtschatica of the Late Eocene from Kamchatka, Russia and †Cryptomeria protojaponica and †Cryptomeria sichotensis from the Oligocene of Primorye, Russia. Several fossil leafy shoots of †Cryptomeria yunnanensis have been described from Rupelian stage strata of the Lühe Basin in Yunnan, China.

From the Neogene, Cryptomeria is well represented as seed cones, leafy shoots and wood in the fossil records of Europe and Japan. †Cryptomeria rhenana was described from the early Late Miocene to the Late Miocene of Rhein in Morsbach, Germany, from the Early and Middle Pliocene of Northern Italy, to the Middle Pliocene of Dunarobba, Italy and to the Early Pleistocene of Umbria, Italy. †Cryptomeria anglica was described from the Late Miocene of La Cerdana, Spain, to the Late Middle Miocene of Brjánslækur, Iceland and from the Late Miocene to the early Pliocene Brassington Formation of Derbyshire, England. †Cryptomeria miyataensis was described from the Late Miocene of Akita, Japan. Cryptomeria japonica was described from the Late Miocene of Georgia and from the Pliocene of Duab, Abkhazia. It has also been described from the Pliocene of Honshu, Japan, Late Pliocene of Osaka, Japan and from the Pleistocene of Kyushu, Japan.

== Cultivation ==
=== Timber ===
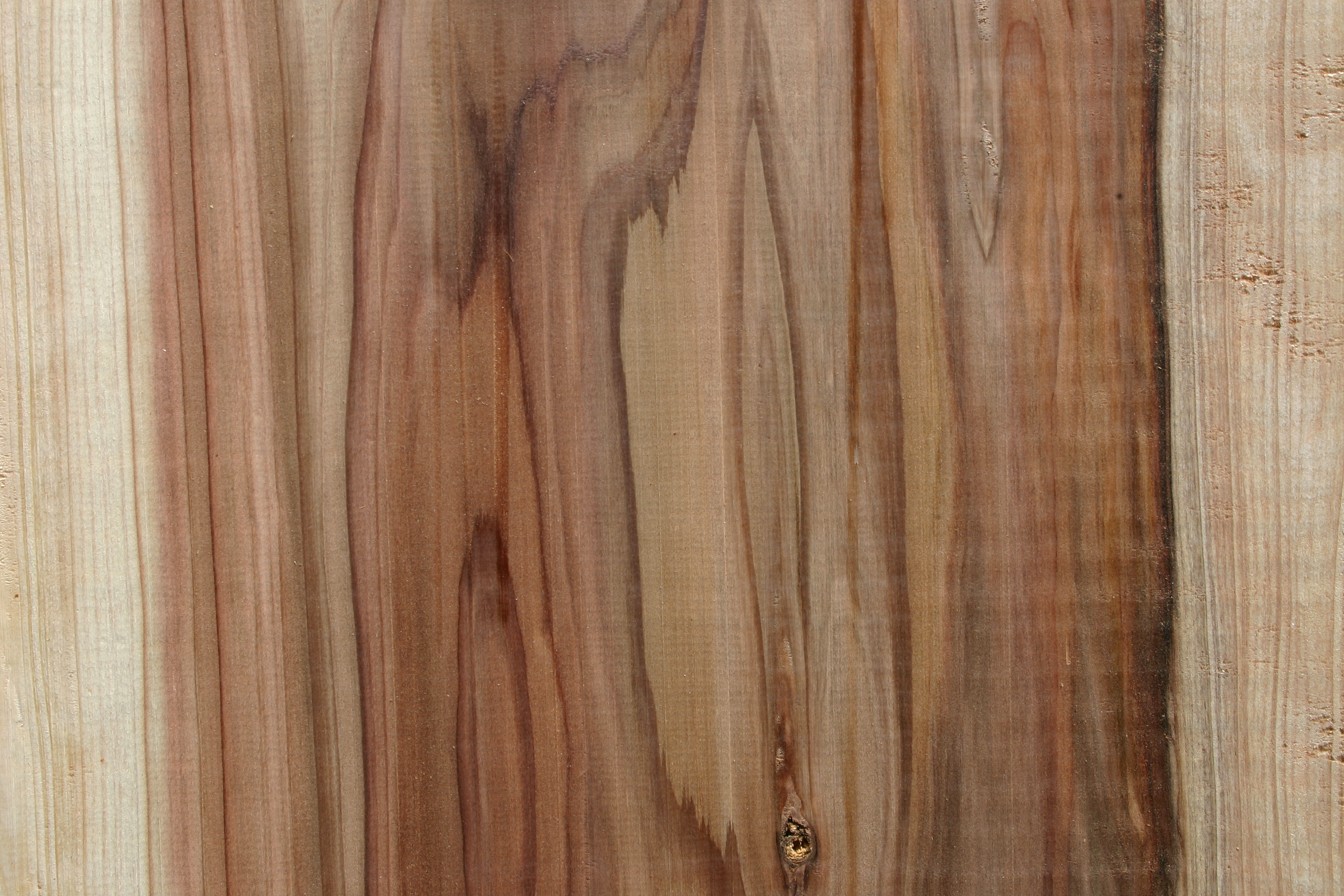
Plank cut from Cryptomeria japonica

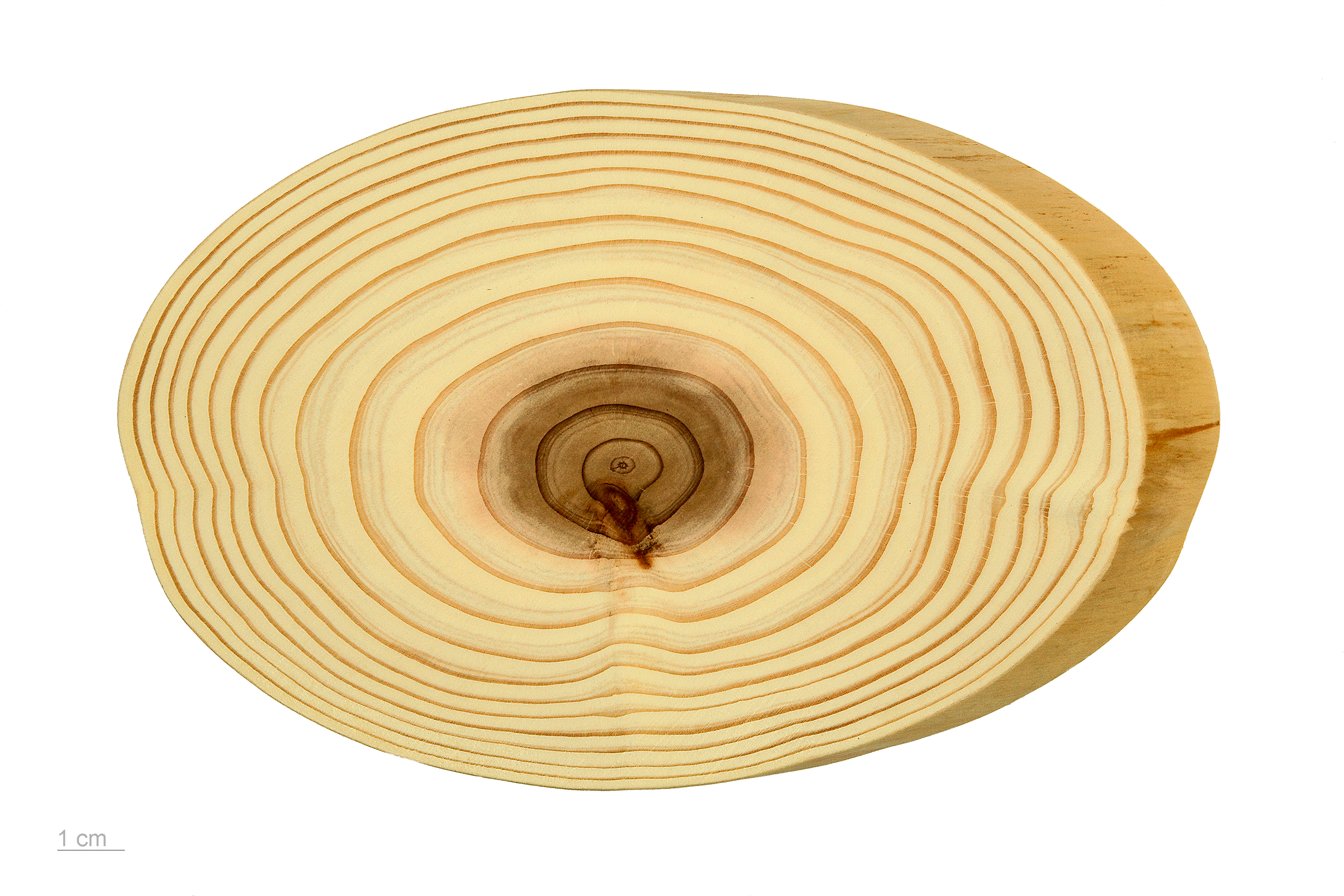
Cross section

Cryptomeria japonica timber is extremely fragrant, weather and insect resistant, soft, and with a low density. The timber is used for the making of staves, tubs, casks, furniture and other indoor applications. Easy to saw and season, it is favoured for light construction, boxes, veneers and plywood. Wood that has been buried turns dark green and is much valued. Resin from the tree contains cryptopimaric and phenolic acid.

The heartwood is scented, reddish-pink in colour, lightweight, waterproof and resistant to decay. It is used in Japan for all types of construction work as well as interior panelling, etc.

In Japan, the coppicing method of daisugi (台杉) is sometimes used to harvest logs.

Outside of its native range, Cryptomeria was also introduced to the Azores in the mid 19th century for wood production. It is currently the most cultivated species in the archipelago, occupying over 12,698 hectares, 60% of the production forest and about 1/5 of the region's total land area. In Darjeeling district and Sikkim in India, it is one of the most widely grown trees, called Dhuppi in the region, and is favoured for its light wood, extensively used in house building.

==== Mechanical properties ====
In dry air conditions, the initial density of sugi timber has been determined to be about 300–420 kg/m^{3}. It displays a Young's modulus of 8017 MPa, 753 MPa and 275 MPa in the longitudinal, radial and tangential direction in relation to the wood fibres.

=== Ornamental ===
Cryptomeria japonica is extensively used in forestry plantations in Japan, China and the Azores islands, and is widely cultivated as an ornamental tree in other temperate areas, including Britain, Europe, North America and eastern Himalaya regions of Nepal and India.

The cultivar 'Elegans' is notable for retaining juvenile foliage throughout its life, instead of developing normal adult foliage when one year old (see the picture with different shoots). It makes a small, shrubby tree 5–10 m (16–33 ft) tall. There are numerous dwarf cultivars that are widely used in rock gardens and for bonsai, including 'Tansu', 'Koshyi', 'Little Diamond', 'Yokohama' and 'Kilmacurragh'.

The following cultivars have gained the Royal Horticultural Society's Award of Garden Merit (confirmed 2017):

- C. japonica 'Bandai-sugi'
- C. japonica 'Elegans Compacta'
- C. japonica 'Elegans Viridis'
- C. japonica 'Globosa Nana'
- C. japonica 'Golden Promise'
- C. japonica 'Sekkan-sugi'
- C. japonica 'Spiralis'
- C. japonica 'Vilmoriniana'

== Symbolism ==
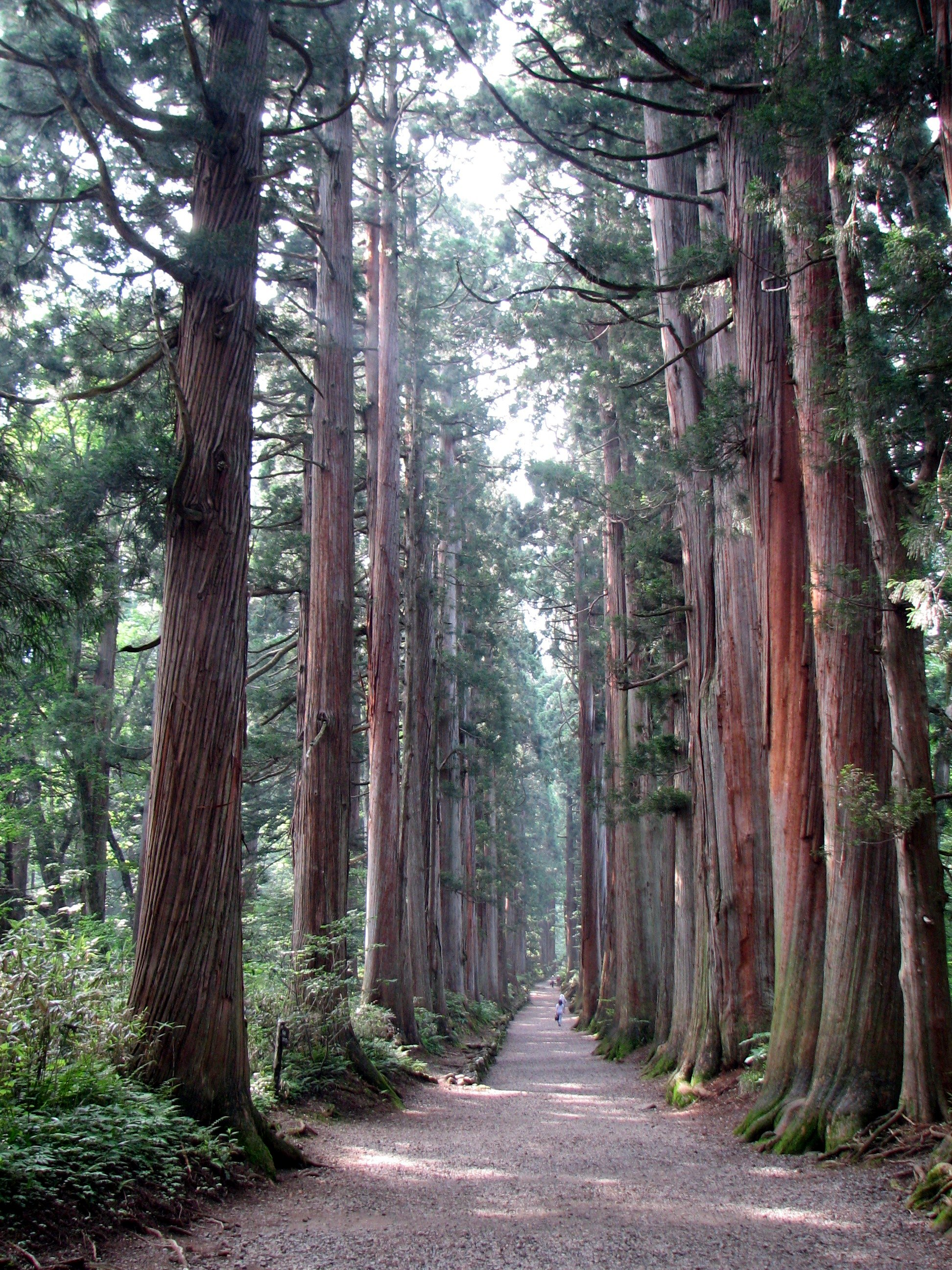
Avenue of mature Sugi trees at the Togakushi shrine in Nagano

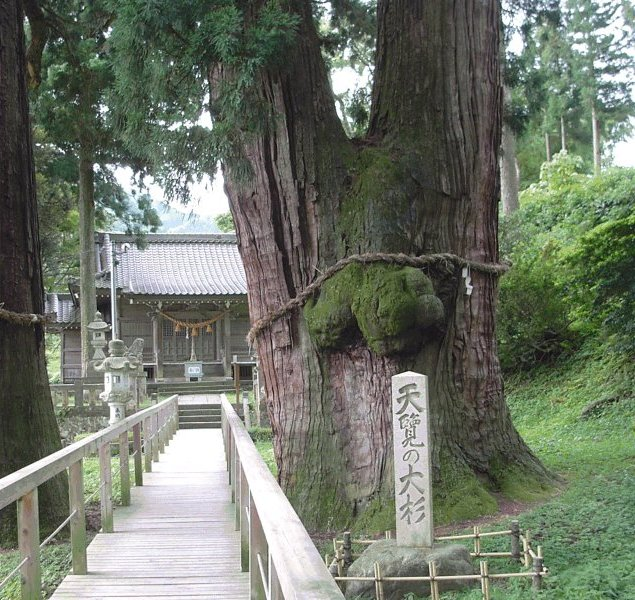
Great sugi of Kayano 54.8 metres (180 ft) high, 11.5 metres (38 ft) in circumference and 3.41 metres (11.2 ft) in diameter, in precinct of Sugawara Shrine

Sugi is commonly planted around temples and shrines, with many hugely impressive trees planted centuries ago. Sargent (1894; The Forest Flora of Japan) recorded the instance of a daimyō (feudal lord) who was too poor to donate a stone lantern at the funeral of the shōgun Tokugawa Ieyasu (1543–1616) at Nikkō Tōshō-gū, but requested instead to be allowed to plant an avenue of sugi, so that "future visitors might be protected from the heat of the sun". The offer was accepted; the Cedar Avenue of Nikkō, which still exists, is over 65 km (40 mi) long, and "has not its equal in stately grandeur".

Jōmon Sugi (縄文杉) is a large cryptomeria tree located on Yakushima, a UNESCO World Heritage Site, in Japan. It is the oldest and largest among the old-growth cryptomeria trees on the island, and is estimated to be between 2,170 and 7,200 years old.

Cryptomeria are often described and referred to in Japanese literature. For instance, cryptomeria forests and their workers, located on the mountains north of Kyoto, are featured in Yasunari Kawabata's famous book The Old Capital.

== Gallery ==
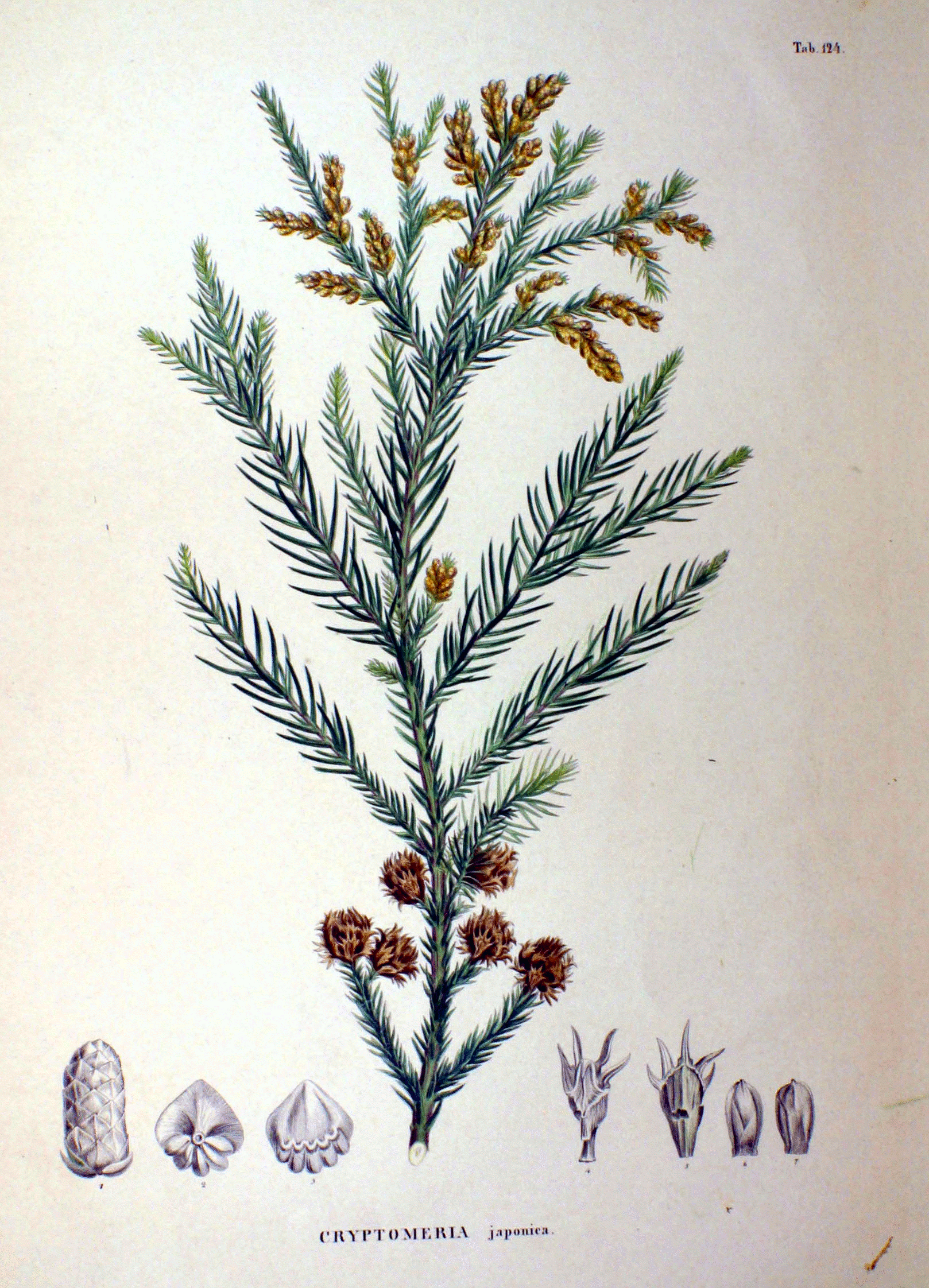
Plate from Flora Japonica by Philipp Franz von Siebold and Joseph Gerhard Zuccarini

Closeup of cones (mostly brown and ripe) and claw-like needles (foliage) of cultivated tree, Lammas Park, Ealing

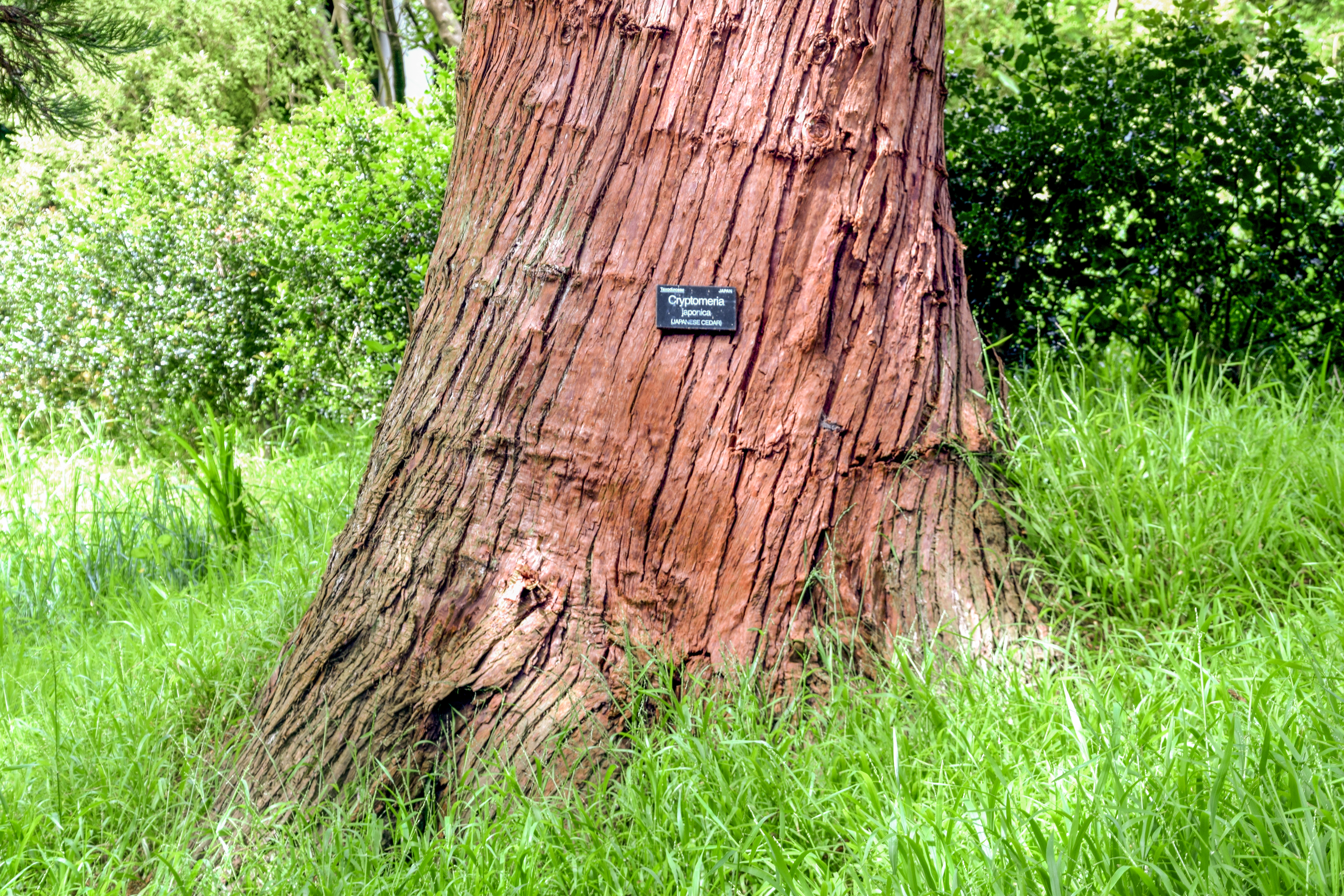
Bark

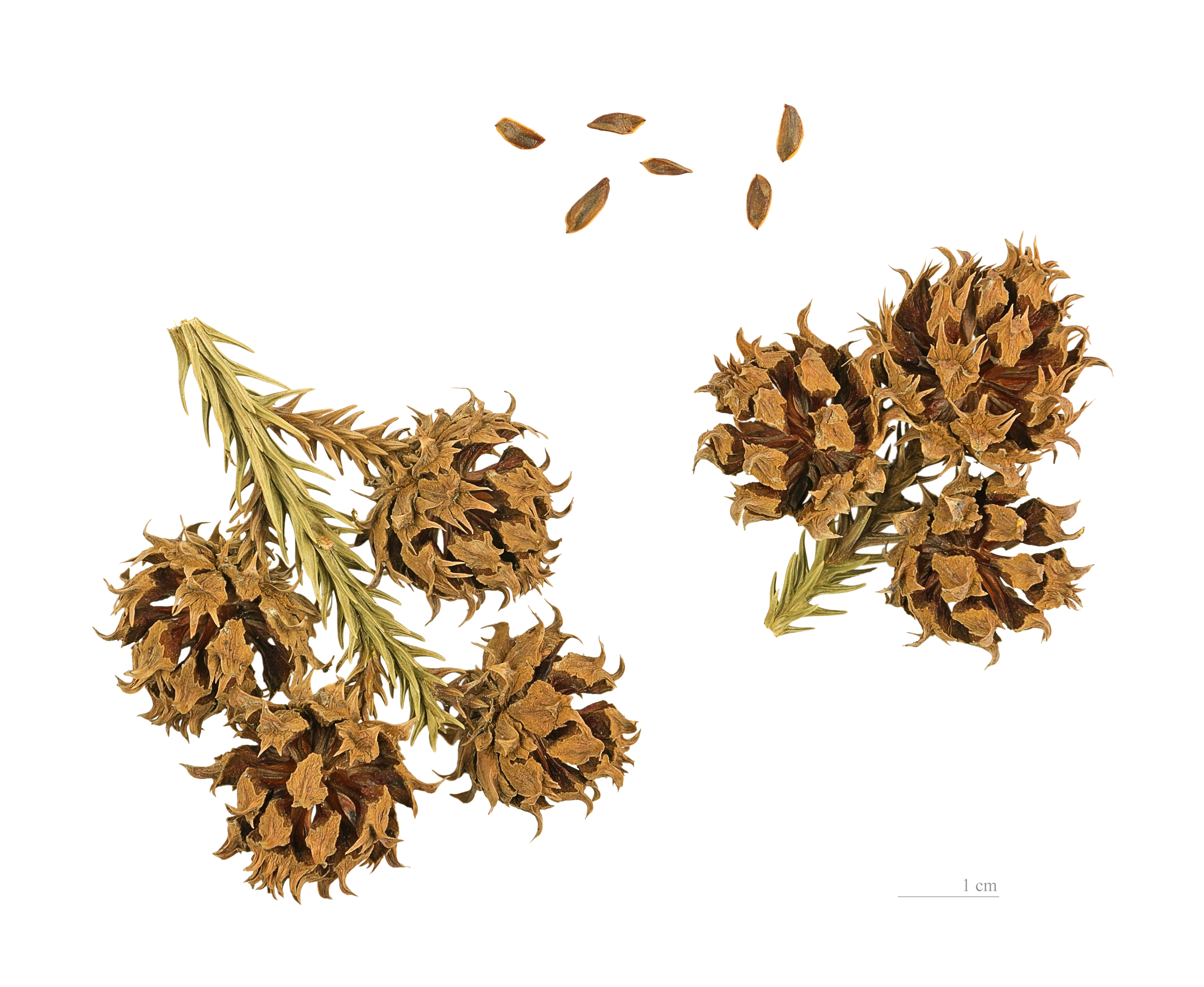
Cone and seed

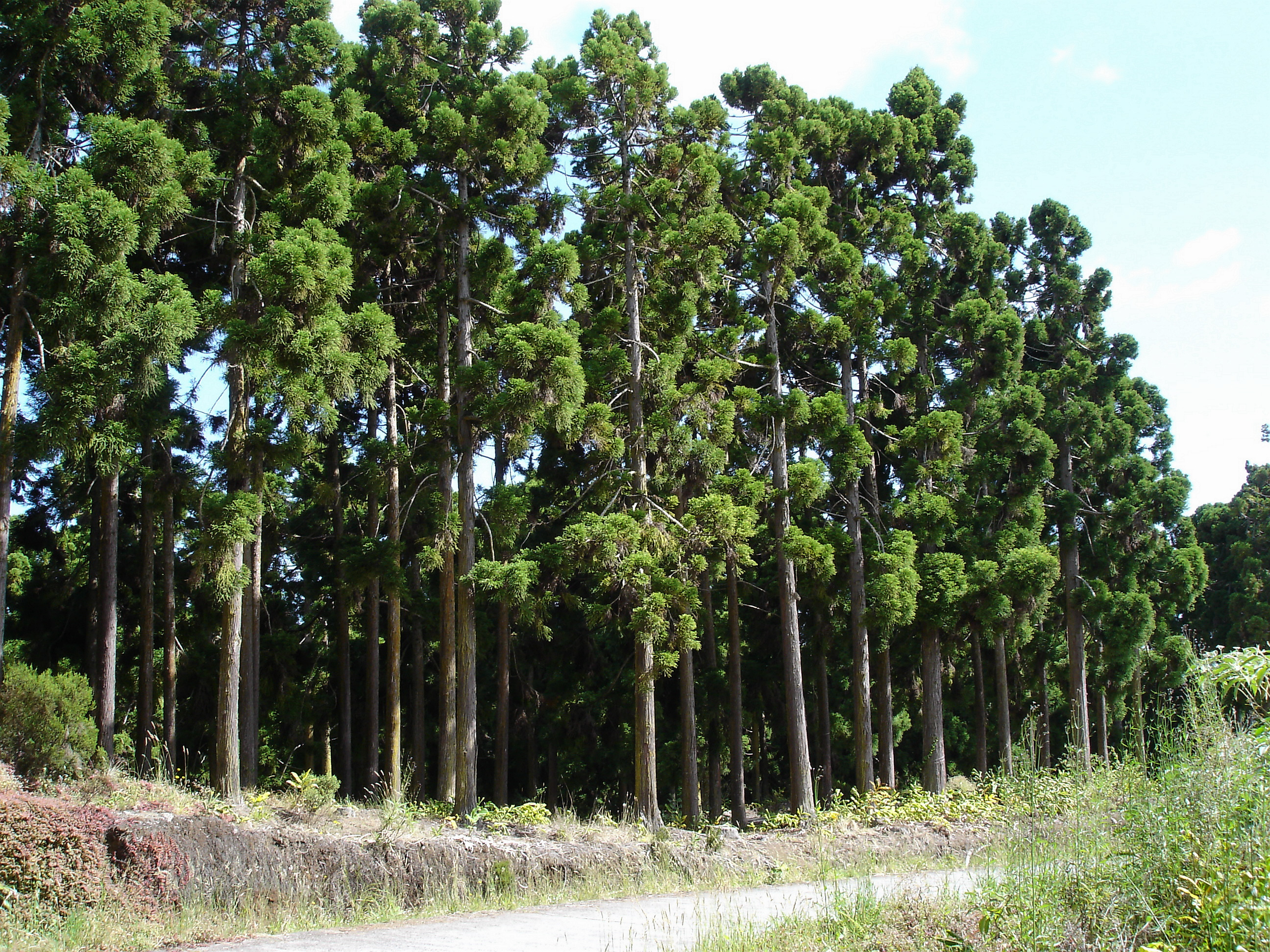
A forestry plantation

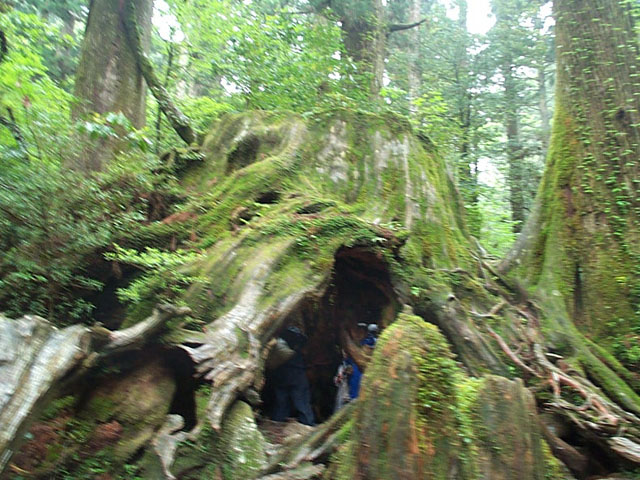
Wilson's Stump was a sugi tree on Yaku Island estimated to be over 2,000 years old when cut.

Grown as a bonsai

== See also ==
- Great sugi of Kayano
- Houkisugi at Nakagawa
- Sugi no Osugi
- Jōmon Sugi
- List of superlative trees
- Onbashira
- Magewappa a traditional Japanese wood craft using Cryptomeria
