= Great sugi of Kayano =

One of the oldest known living trees to have been planted by humans

Coordinates: 36°13′39″N 136°21′36″E

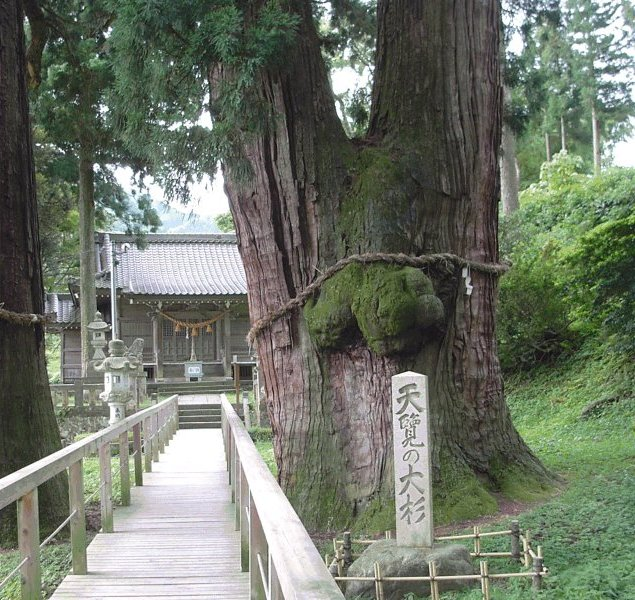
Great sugi in 2007

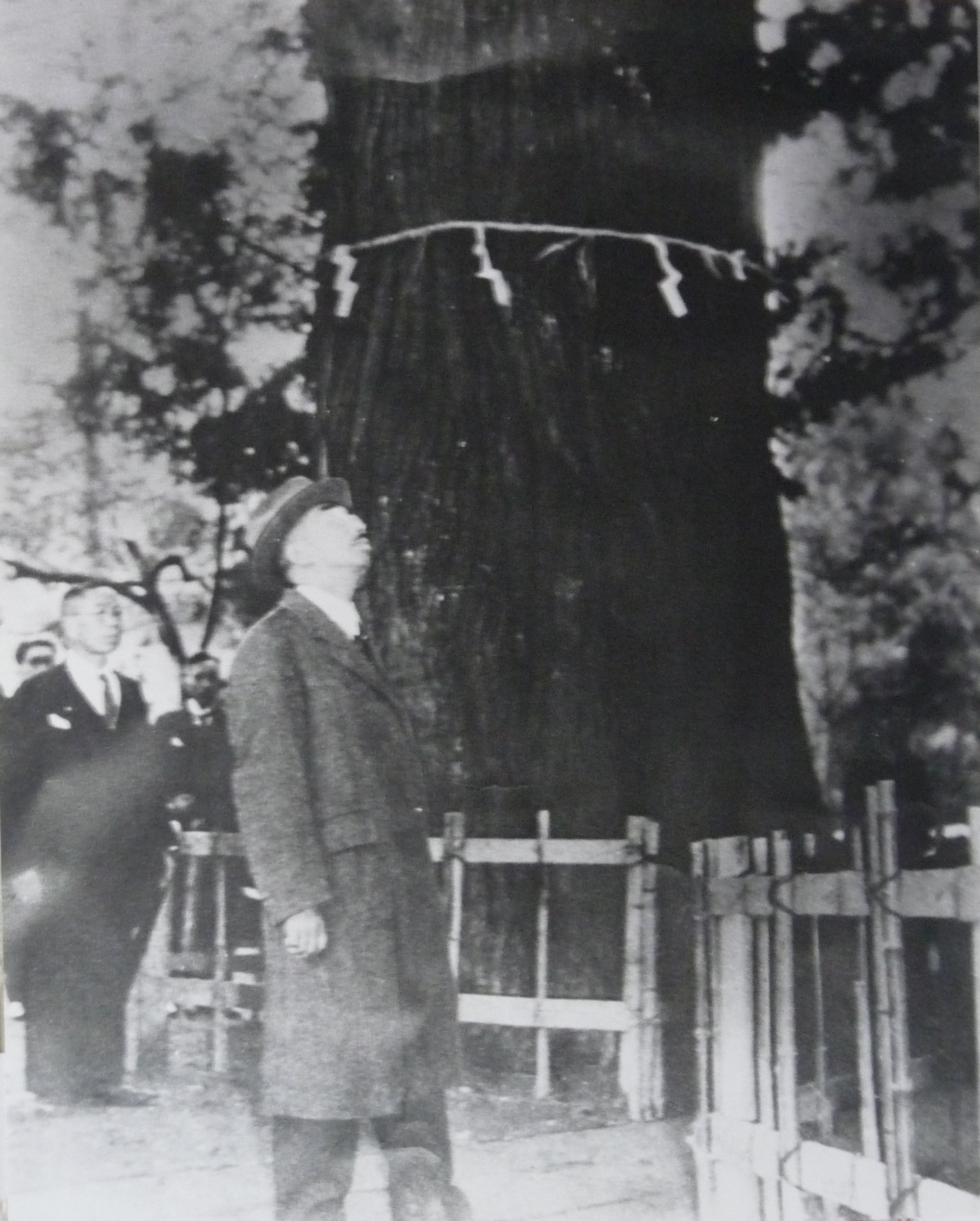
Emperor Shōwa gazes at Kayano Osugi on 27 October 1947

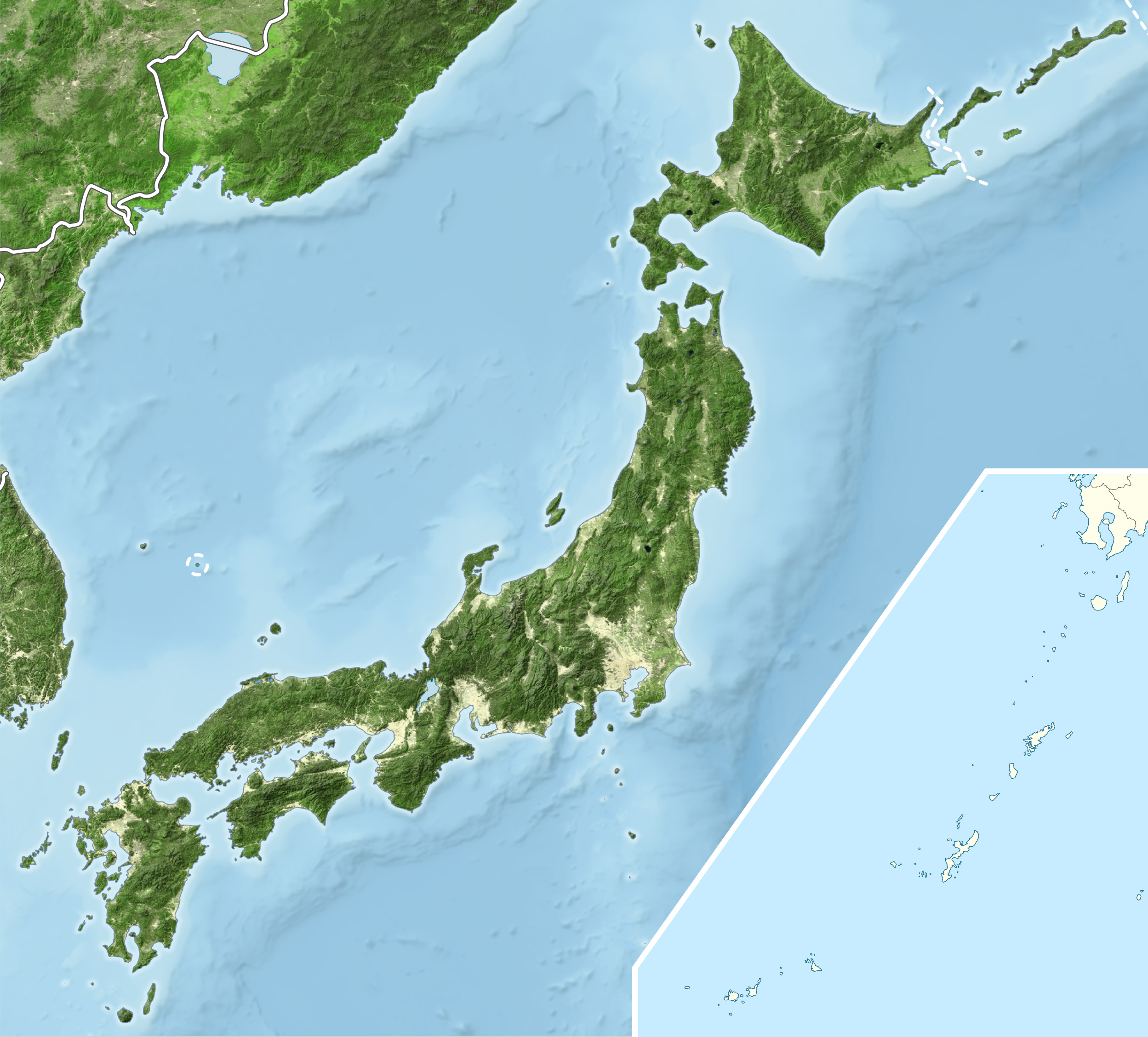
Location of Great sugi of Kayano

The great sugi of Kayano (栢野大杉, Kayano Ōsugi) is a Cryptomeria (Sugi) tree at Yamanaka Onsen in Kaga, Ishikawa Prefecture, Japan. One of the four trees believed to be sacred in the precincts of the Sugawara Shrine, it has received the distinction of designation as a Special Natural Monument from the Agency for Cultural Affairs of Japan.

The tree stands 54.8 metres (180 ft) tall. At the base, it measures 11.5 metres (38 ft) in circumference and 3.41 metres (11.2 ft) across. At chest height, it is 9.6 metres (31 ft) around and 3.0 metres (9.8 ft) across. The tree splits into two trunks 4.9 metres (16 ft) above ground level. In 1928, Professor Manabu Miyoshi of Tokyo Imperial University estimated the age of the tree to be 2,300 years. The other three trees are 8.8 metres (29 ft), 6.65 metres (21.8 ft) and 7.8 metres (26 ft) at chest height and natural monument of Ishikawa Prefecture. These four trees are deemed artificially planted by humans because the trees positions form the corners of a rectangle, and due to Jōmon pottery excavated from a field hill adjacent to the shrine.

Jōmon period artifacts unearthed near the shrine establish that human habitation in the area surrounding the tree predates recorded history. Warriors including members of the Taira, Minamoto, Asakura, and the Togashi (富樫氏) clan are said to have come to the shrine. In 1947, on the occasion of the second National Sports Festival of Japan (held in Ishikawa Prefecture), Emperor Shōwa visited the great sugi.

== See also ==
- Jōmon Sugi
- Sugi no Osugi
- List of individual trees
- List of oldest trees
- List of records of Japan
