= Jōmon Sugi =

Exceptionally old Cryptomeria tree in Yakushima, Japan

Coordinates: 30.3610°N 130.5319°E

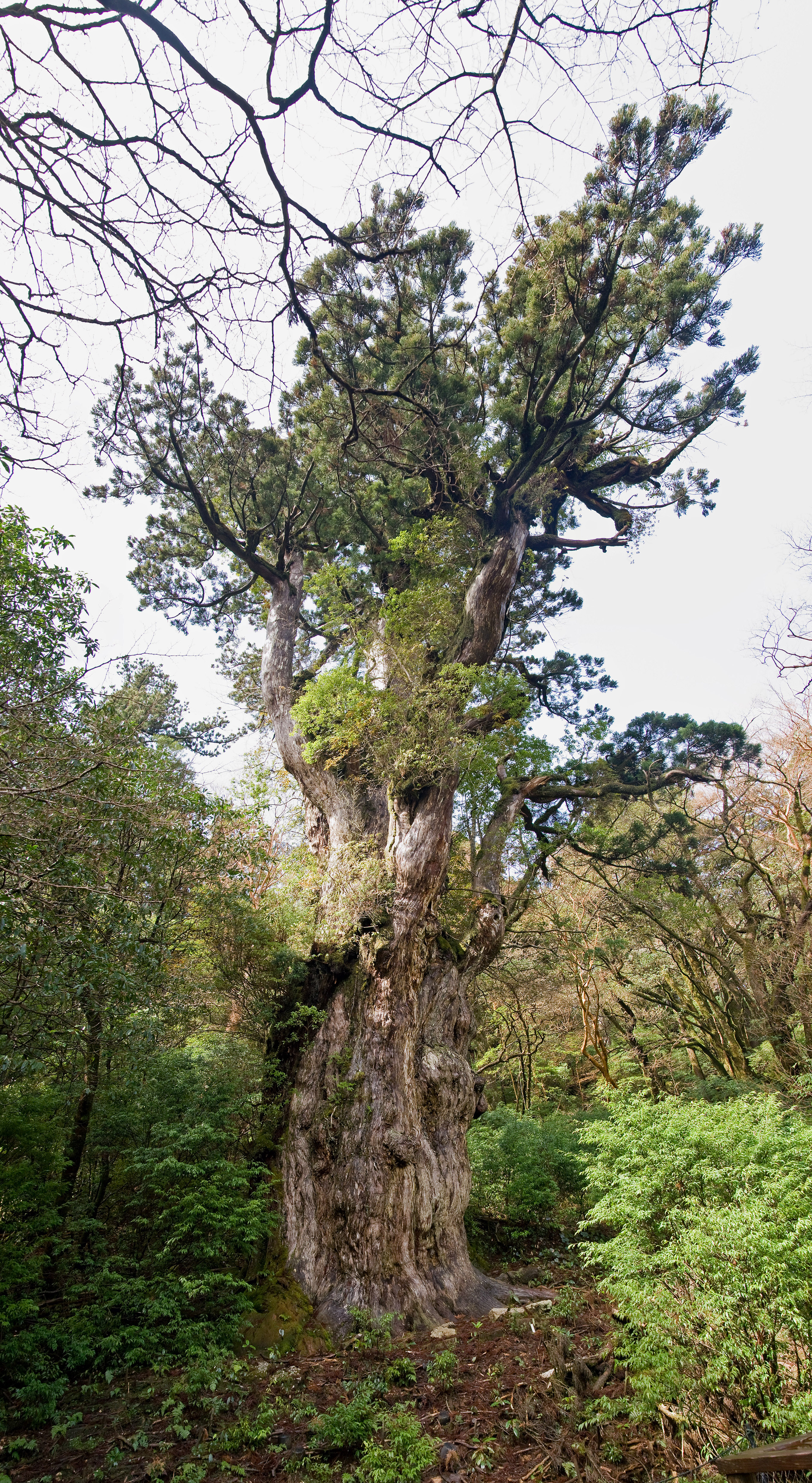
Jōmon Sugi, located on the island of Yakushima, is the oldest and largest specimen of Cryptomeria japonica.

Jōmon Sugi (縄文杉) is a large Cryptomeria tree (yakusugi) located on Yakushima, a UNESCO World Heritage Site, in Japan. It is the oldest and largest among the old-growth cryptomeria trees on the island, and is estimated to be between 2,170 and 7,200 years old. Other estimates of the tree's age include "at least 5,000 years", "more than 6,000 years", and "up to 7,000 years old". The tree's name is a reference to the Jōmon period of Japanese prehistory.

== Overview ==
Jōmon Sugi stands 25.3 m (83 ft) tall and has a volume of approximately 10,000 cu ft (300 m^{3}).

Jōmon Sugi is located on the north face of Mount Miyanoura, the highest peak on Yakushima, at an elevation of 1,300 m (4,300 ft). Discovery of the tree in 1968 "sparked moves to protect the forests" of Yakushima and gave rise to the island's tourist industry, which today comprises more than half of its economy.

Jōmon Sugi is accessible via the Kusugawa Hiking Path (east of Miyanoura) and the Arakawa Trail (starting at the Arakawa Dam), but requires a "four-to-five hour mountain hike" from the nearest road to reach. After the designation of Yakushima as a World Heritage Site in 1993, local officials restricted access to the tree to an observation deck built at a distance of 15 m (49 ft) from the tree.

The tree has a height of 25.3 m (83 ft) and a trunk circumference of 16.4 m (54 ft). It has a volume of approximately 300 m^{3} (11,000 cu ft), making it the largest conifer in Japan. Tree-ring dating conducted by Japanese scientists on the tree's branches indicated that Jōmon Sugi is at least 2,000 years old. In Remarkable Trees of the World (2002), arborist Thomas Pakenham describes Jōmon Sugi as "a grim titan of a tree, rising from the spongy ground more like rock than timber, his vast muscular arms extended above the tangle of young cedars and camphor trees".

In 2005, vandals stripped from the tree a piece of bark measuring about 10 cm (4 in) on each side.

In April 2009, Jōmon Sugi was partnered with Tāne Mahuta in New Zealand's Waipoua Forest.

== See also ==
- List of oldest trees
- List of records of Japan
- Great sugi of Kayano
- List of individual trees
