= Shiyakushomae Station (Nagano) =

Railway station in Nagano, Nagano Prefecture, Japan

Shiyakushomae Station 市役所前駅
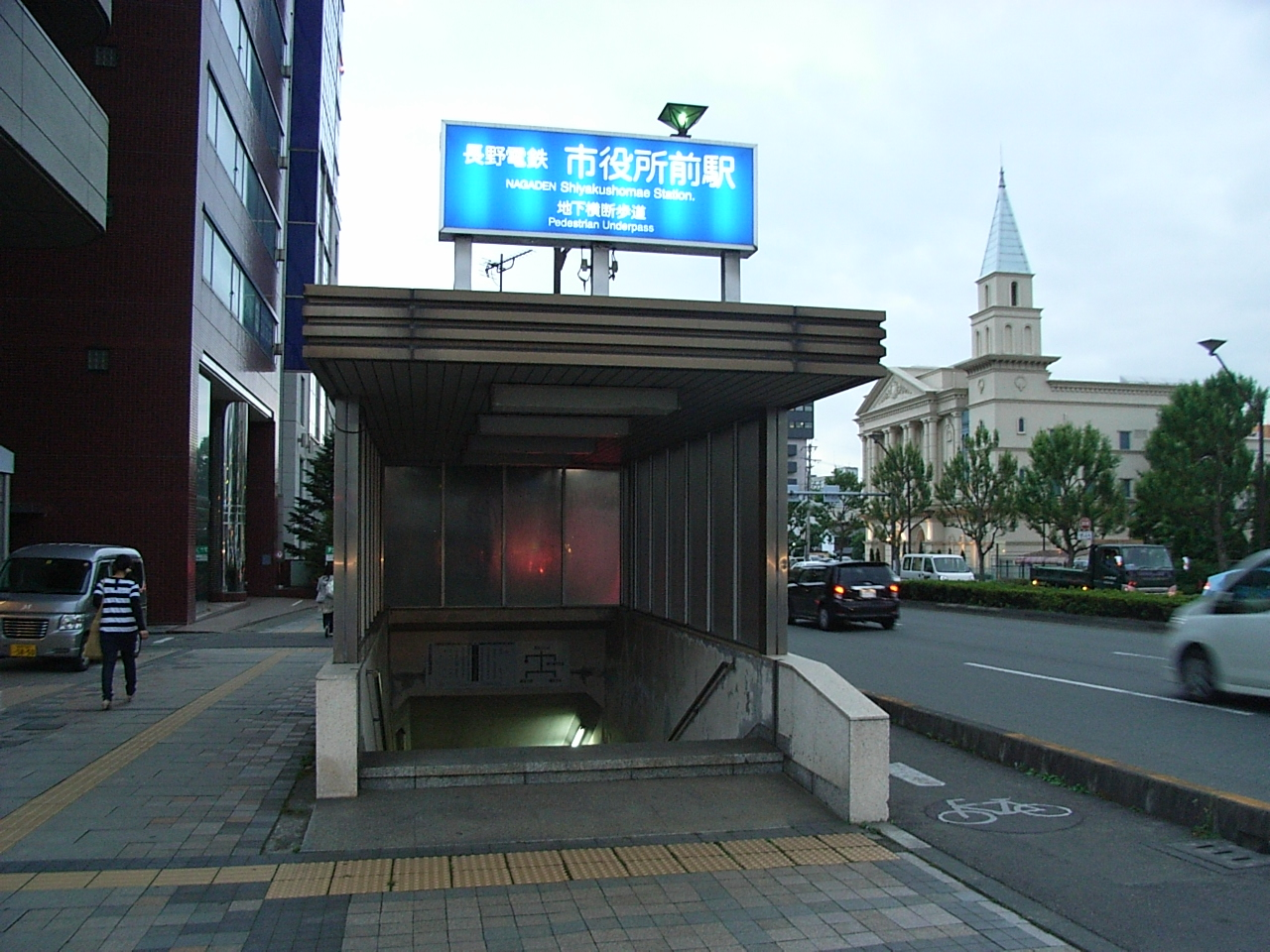
- Shiyakushomae Station in July 2009

General information
- Location: 1120-5 Tsuruga-Morishita-chō, Nagano-shi, Nagano-ken 381-0000; Japan
- Coordinates: 36°38′56.9″N 138°11′20.3″E
- Operator: Nagano Electric Railway
- Line: ■ Nagano Electric Railway Nagano Line
- Distance: 0.4 km from Nagano
- Platforms: 2 side platforms
- Tracks: 2

Other information
- Station code: N2
- Website: Official website

History
- Opened: 24 June 1928

Passengers
- FY2016: 593 daily
Location
- Location within Japan

Shiyakushomae Station (市役所前駅, Shiyakushomae-eki) is an underground railway station in the city of Nagano, Japan, operated by the private railway operating company Nagano Electric Railway.

== Lines ==
Shiyakushomae Station is a station on the Nagano Electric Railway Nagano Line and is 0.4 kilometers from the terminus of the line at Nagano Station.

== Station layout ==
The station is an underground staffed station consisting of two opposed side platforms serving two tracks. There are two entrances, North and South, to the station. The southern entrance has limited operating hours.

=== Platforms ===
1	■ Nagano Electric Railway Nagano Line	for Suzaka, Shinshū-Nakano and Yudanaka
2	■ Nagano Electric Railway Nagano Line	for Nagano

== History ==
- The station opened June 24, 1928, between Nagano and Gondo, with the name Kojimachi Station.
- On March 1, 1981, the line was moved underground.

== Adjacent stations ==
«	Service	»
Nagano Electric Railway
Express-A: Does not stop at this station
Nagano	Express-B	Gondō
Nagano	Local	Gondō

== Passenger statistics ==
In fiscal 2016, the station was used by an average of 593 passengers daily (boarding passengers only).

Fiscal year	Daily average
2005	563
2006	558
2007	534
2008	533
2009	530
2010	517
2011	503
2012	513
2013	547
2014	547
2015	596

== Surrounding area ==
- Nagano City Hall
- National Route 19
- TOiGo
- NTT DoCoMo Nagano Building
- Monzen Plaza

== Gallery ==
Shiyakushomae Station (Nagano)
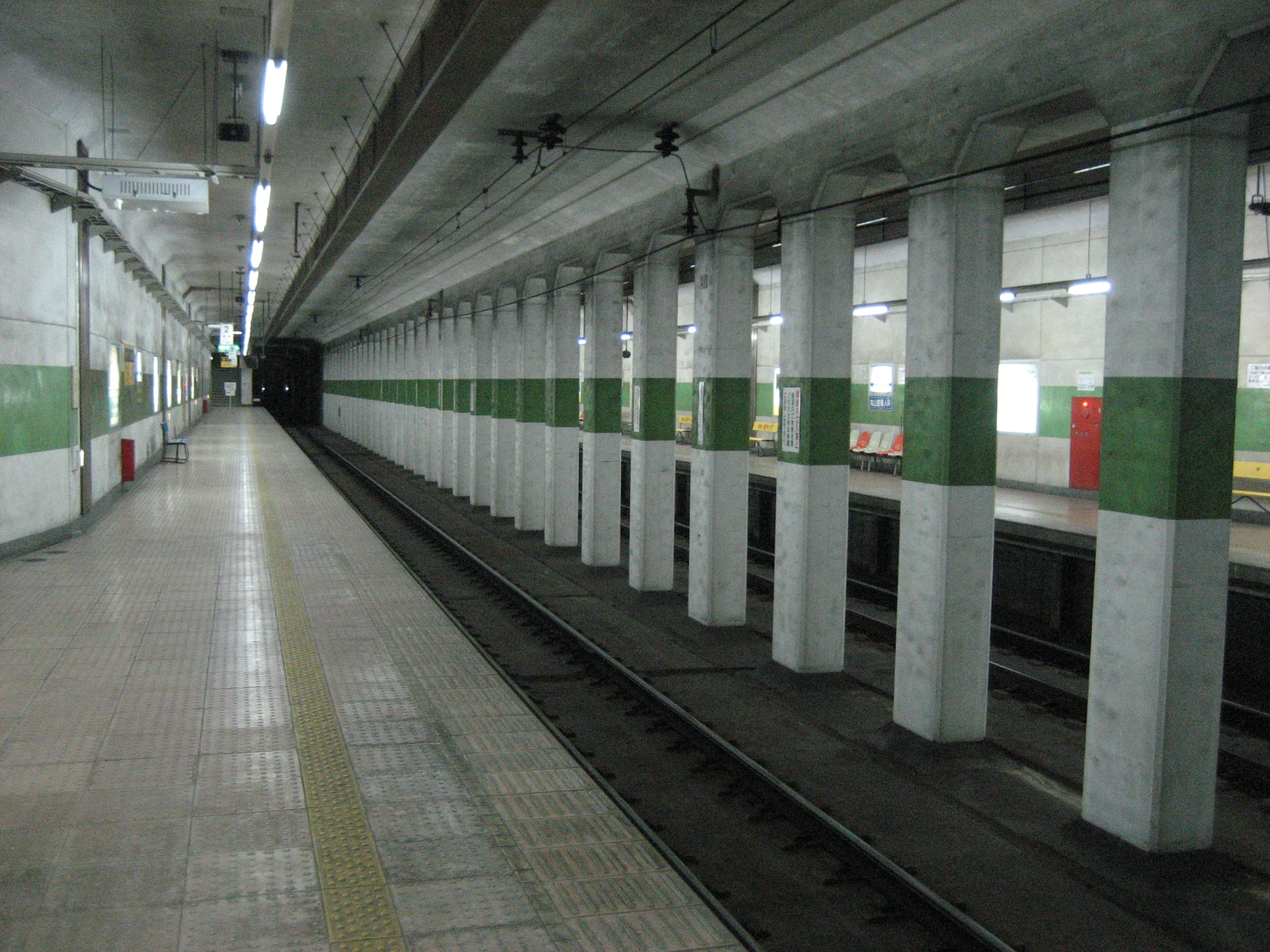
Station platform

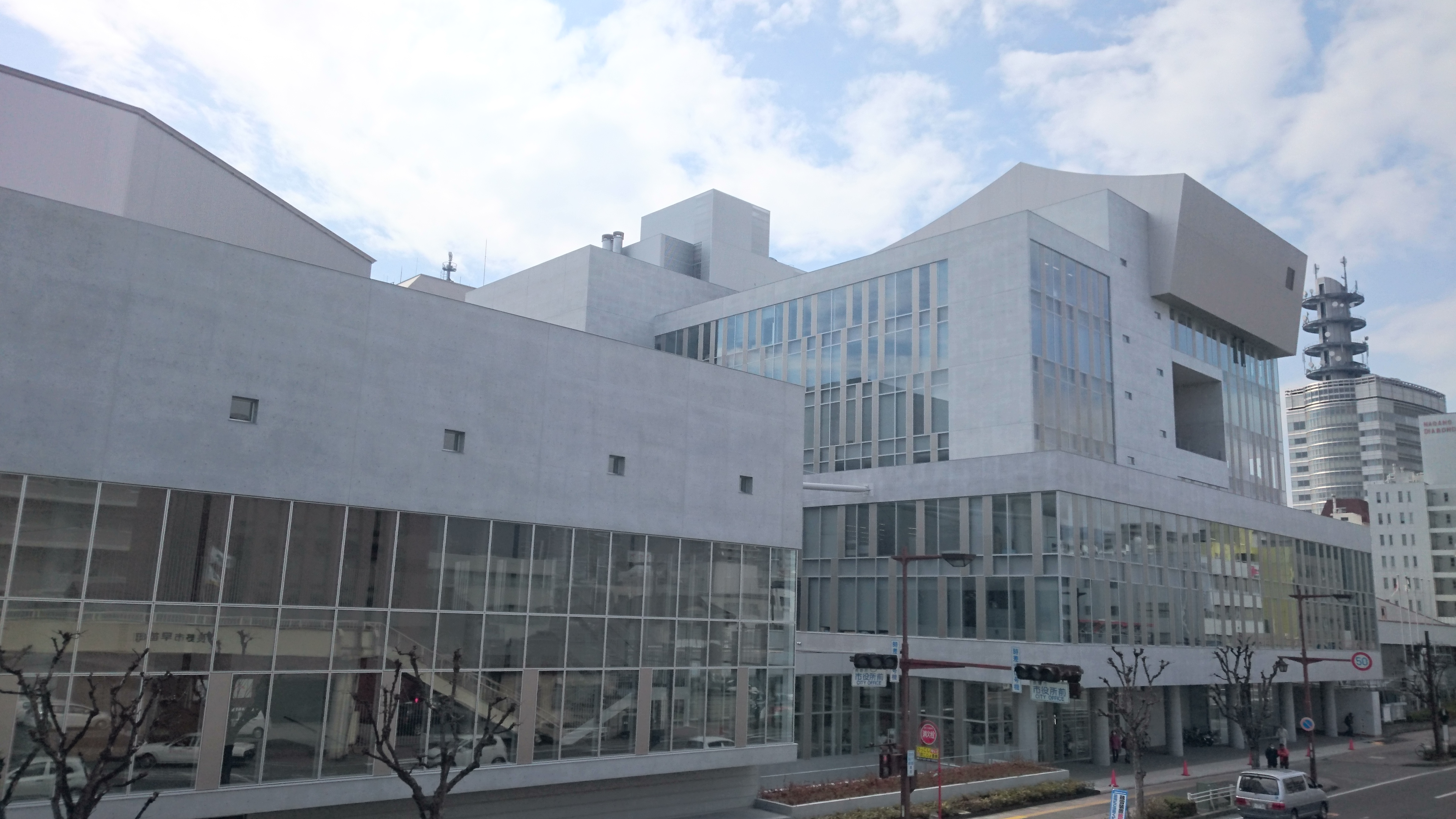
Nagano City Hall

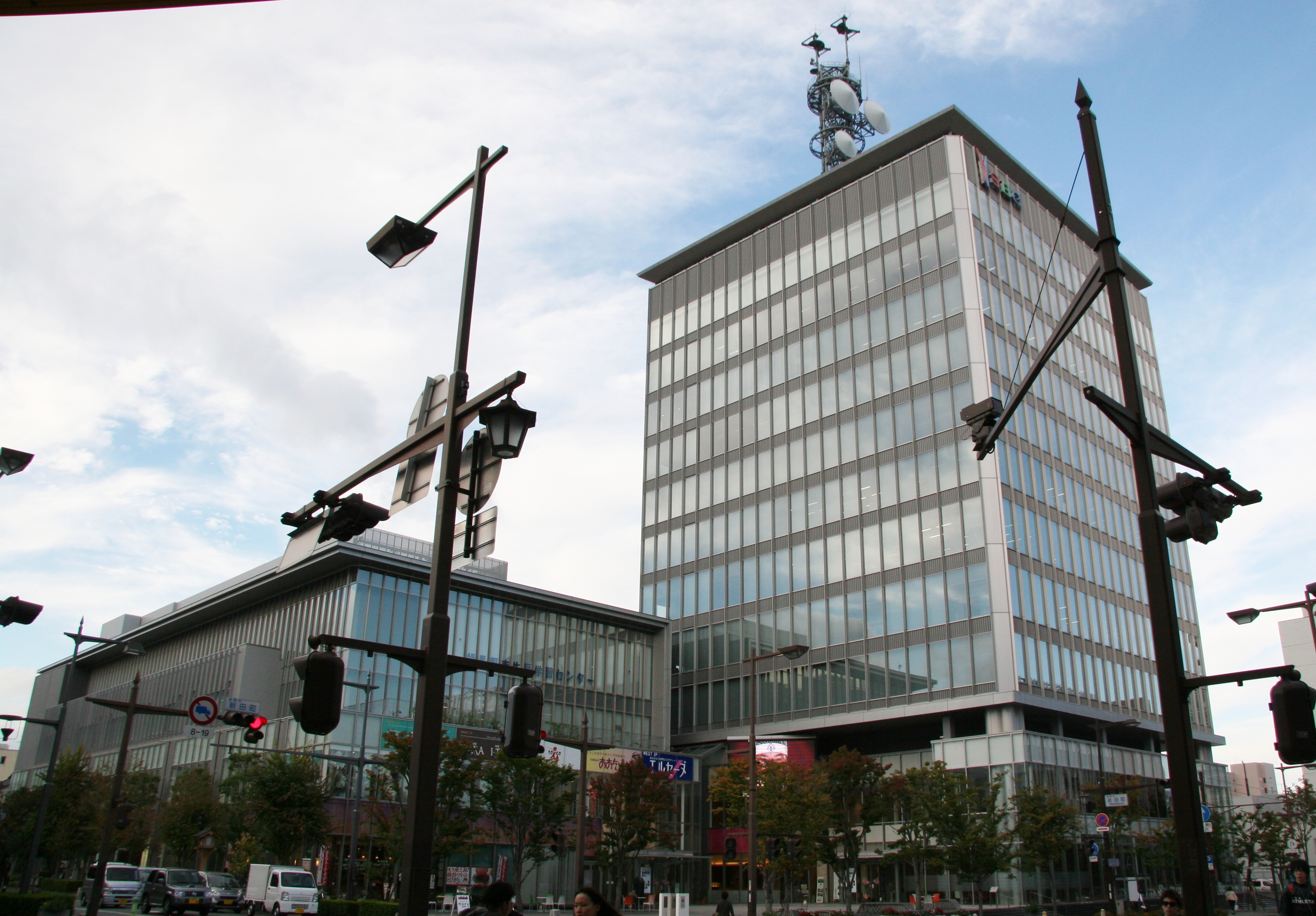
TOiGo

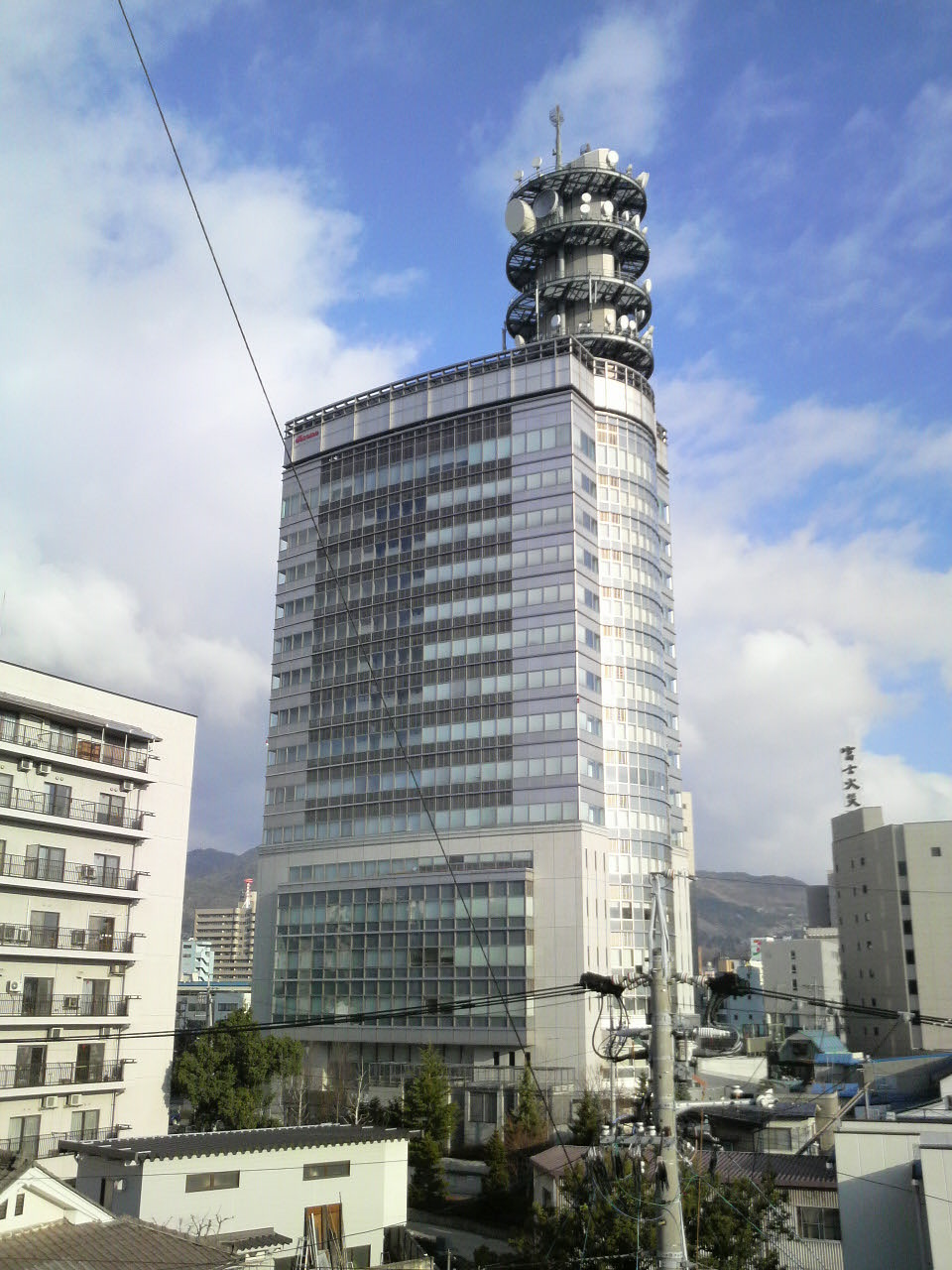
NTT DoCOMo Nagano

== See also ==
- List of railway stations in Japan
