= List of typhoons in Japan (pre–1600) =

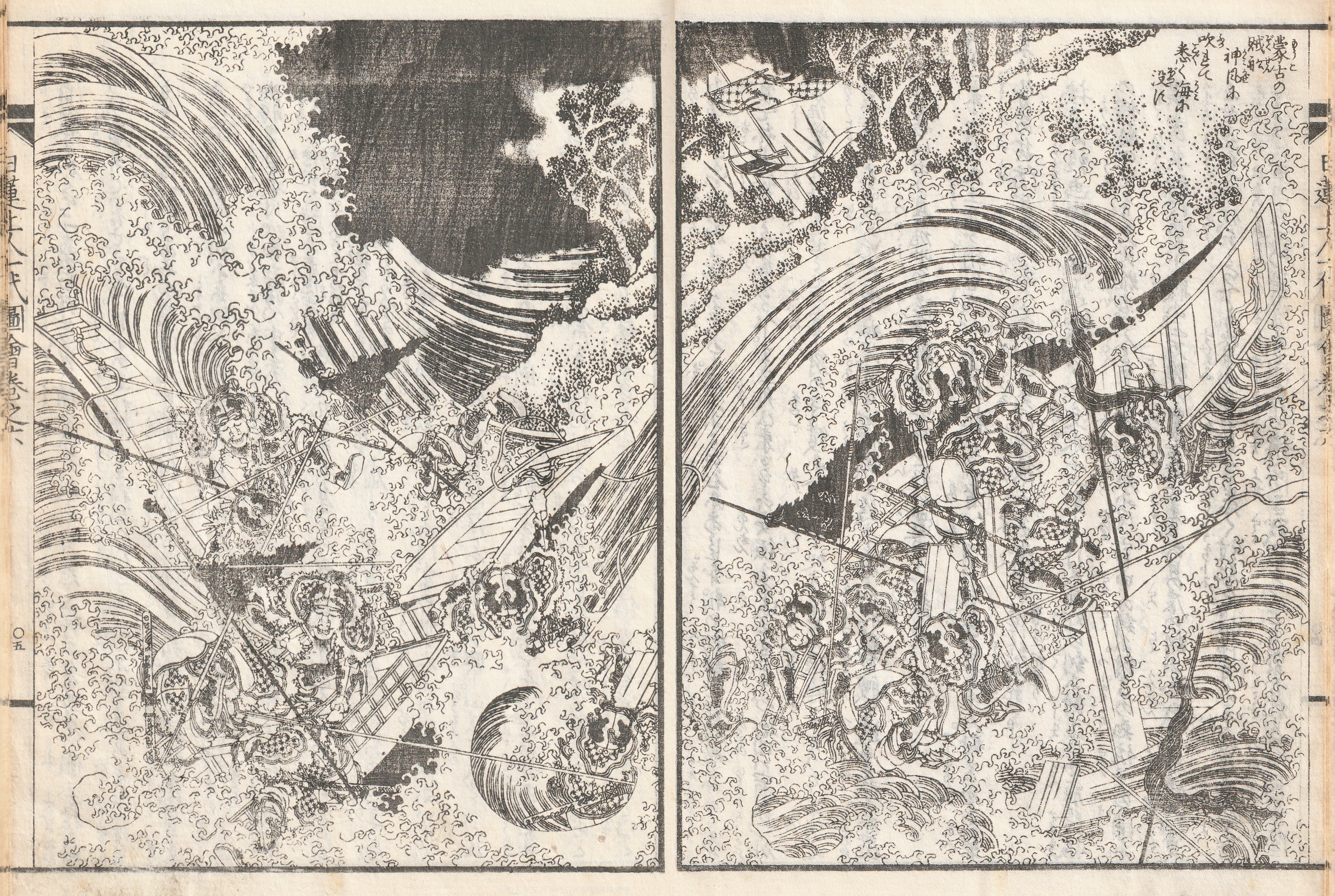
Illustration of the kamikaze typhoons destroying the Mongol fleet by Katsushika Isai (1821–1880)

Japan is a country that frequently experiences typhoons, and one with an extensive written historical record in the form of national histories, temple and shrine records, chronicles, and diaries. Numerous typhoon records exist scattered across the nation: at least 310 storms have been recorded between 794 and 1400 in Kyoto alone. Typhoons have been described in works of literature such as The Pillow Book and The Tale of Genji. Particularly damaging typhoons have been named as reasons for era name changes. The kamikaze typhoons in the 13th century prevented the Mongol conquest of Japan.

== Background ==
In historical records, the term ōkaze (Japanese: 大風) is most often used to refer to typhoons, though the use ot this word is not limited to tropical cyclones. Several other terms were also used, such as akarasamakaze (Japanese: 暴風), appearing as early as the Nihon Shoki; and nowaki (Japanese: 野分), which was chiefly used in Japanese literature between the 10th and 14th centuries, but was possibly applied for typhoons as late as the 15th century.

Through utilizing paleotempestological methods, past long-term trends in typhoon activity can be determined. Storm deposits in Kamikoshiki-shima indicate periods of heightened activity between 3,600 and 2,500 years before present; between 1,000 and 300 years before present; and around the time of the kamikaze typhoons. Sediments at Lake Daija in Amakusa mark an active period between 250 and 1600 AD. Analysis of historical texts in Kyoto revealed an increased frequency of typhoons in the 12th–14th centuries compared to the 9th–11th centuries. Shifts in annual activity patterns can also be observed. During the 9th–11th centuries, over 70% of typhoons that struck Kyoto occurred between late August and mid-October, whereas in the 12th century this ratio drops to around 60%, and in turn the number of typhoons between late July and mid-August saw an increase. Through the 13th and 14th centuries, this trend continued, while the number of early- and late-season typhoons (before late July and after mid-October, respectively) rose. The increased frequency of typhoon impacts in Kyoto between 1210 and 1360, particularly in the early season, is likely correlated to a temperature drop and a southerly shift of the westerlies that coincided with the end of the Nara-Heian-Kamakura warm period in 1296.

== Historical typhoons ==
=== Pre-800 ===
- Between 451 and 484: Analysis of "resin freckles" (resin-filled permanent fissures in the wood caused by strong wind) in yakusugi cedar trees indicate that an intense typhoon with estimated winds of 75.2 m/s (271 km/h; 168 mph; 146.2 kn) struck Yakushima. Yamaguchi et al. (2012) estimates the year of the event at 473.
- September 9, 473 (O.S. September 8): A strong typhoon struck the Kumano Region (the southern portion of Wakayama and Mie Prefectures) and destroyed swaths of woodland. Manabe & Kawakatsu (1968) estimated the windspeed at 58.0 m/s (209 km/h; 130 mph; 112.7 kn). This is one of, if not the, earliest recorded instance of an individual typhoon in Japanese history. While earlier records (e.g., during the reigns of Emperors Jimmu and Keikō) do depict similar storm events, the emperors themselves are largely considered to be legendary figures and their records unreliable.
- Between 511 and 528: Analysis of resin freckles in yakusugi cedar trees indicate that an intense typhoon with estimated winds of 60.5 m/s (218 km/h; 135 mph; 117.6 kn) struck Yakushima.
- Between 537 and 552: Analysis of resin freckles in yakusugi cedar trees indicate that an intense typhoon with estimated winds of 87.0 m/s (313 km/h; 195 mph; 169.1 kn) struck Yakushima. Yamaguchi et al. (2012) estimates the year of the event at 545. This is the strongest wind event included in the study, with a possible return period of 5,000 years.
- 638: A typhoon affected Yamato Province (modern-day Nara Prefecture), snapping trees and destroying homes.
- 639: A typhoon struck Yamato Province.
- 643: A typhoon struck Yamato Province.
- 674 or 675: A typhoon destroyed houses in Yamato Province.
- 675 or 676: A typhoon caused damage in Yoshino District, Nara.
- 679 or 680: A typhoon in Yamato Province damaged houses and trees.
- October 19, 698 (O.S. October 16): A typhoon struck Shimōsa Province, destroying people's houses.
- October 1, 701 (O.S. September 27): According to the Shoku Nihongi, typhoons and locusts swept through 17 provinces, namely Mikawa, Tōtōmi, Sagami, Ōmi, Shinano, Echizen, Sado, Tajima, Hōki, Izumo, Bizen, Aki, Suō, Nagato, Kii, Sanuki, and Iyo, devastating harvests across Japan and destroying peasants' houses. This damage appears to have occurred through late August and September, and reported to the royal court on this date. On October 10, envoys were sent to affected regions to deliver supplies such as food and clothes, in a practice called shingō (Japanese: 賑給). On October 21, Emperor Monmu himself visited Kii Province to encourage the disaster-stricken people.
- September 5, 702 (O.S. September 1): A typhoon struck Suruga and Shimōsa provinces, destroying people's houses and damaging crops. This was followed by a famine, and on October 18, envoys were sent to affected regions to provide shingō.
- 705: During the seventh lunar month (between July 29 and August 27), a typhoon struck Yamato Province, damaging people's houses.
- 713: A typhoon in Yamato Province damaged trees and destroyed houses.
- November 16, 714 (O.S. November 12): A typhoon swept through Japan, causing damage in Mino, Musashi, Shimotsuke, Harima, Hōki and Iyo. Said provinces were exempt from taxation for the year.
- Between 728 and 749: Analysis of resin freckles in yakusugi cedar trees indicate that an intense typhoon with estimated winds of 60.5 m/s (218 km/h; 135 mph; 117.6 kn) struck Yakushima.
- 742: A typhoon caused flooding across the Kinki region.
- November 26, 746 (O.S. November 22): A strong typhoon struck Hyūga Province (modern-day Miyazaki Prefecture). Manabe & Kawakatsu (1968) estimated the windspeed at 30.0 m/s (108 km/h; 67 mph; 58.3 kn).
- Between 750 and 764: Analysis of resin freckles in yakusugi cedar trees indicate that an intense typhoon with estimated winds of 48.3 m/s (174 km/h; 108 mph; 93.9 kn) struck Yakushima.
- October 9, 753 (O.S. October 5): Strong southerly winds from a typhoon caused storm surges in Osaka Bay, which inundated the coast of Settsu Province. The village of 御津 (Mitsu) (within modern-day Osaka City, near Mitsugū Shrine) was hit particularly hard, leaving more than 110 buildings destroyed and at least 560 people drowned. The government supplied the affected people with rice and other necessities, and let the coastal residents move to vacant plots within Naniwa-no-miya, the capital at the time. This typhoon possibly caused crop damage in Kyushu. Due to the damage from this storm, in January 754, the government exempted Settsu Province and Kyushu from taxation for the year.
- September 754: A typhoon caused widespread damage across Kinai and surrounding regions.
- 759: A typhoon affected Yamato Province.
- September 28, 759 (O.S. September 24): A strong typhoon struck Kyushu. Fierce southerly winds destroyed government and civilian buildings. Manabe & Kawakatsu (1968) estimated the windspeed at 40.0 m/s (144 km/h; 89 mph; 77.8 kn).
- Between 765 and 778: Analysis of resin freckles in yakusugi cedar trees indicate that a typhoon with estimated winds of 41.7 m/s (150 km/h; 93 mph; 81.1 kn) struck Yakushima.
- July 18, 766 (O.S. July 14): A strong typhoon struck the provinces of Hyūga, Ōsumi and Satsuma. Manabe & Kawakatsu (1968) estimated the windspeed at 35.0 m/s (126 km/h; 78 mph; 68.0 kn).
- February 24, 770 (O.S. February 20): A strong typhoon struck Kyushu. Manabe & Kawakatsu (1968) estimated the windspeed at 40.0 m/s (144 km/h; 89 mph; 77.8 kn).
- September 11, 772 (O.S. September 7): In Yamato Province, heavy rain began to pour on September 6, followed by fierce winds on September 11. In Kawachi Province, stormwater breached eight sections of the Manda Embankment, which was built by Emperor Nintoku according to Nihon Shoki between the end of the 4th century and the early 5th century; eleven sections of the embankment in Shibukawa County; and five sections of embankment in Shiki County.
- September 25, 775 (O.S. September 21): The provinces of Ise, Owari, and Mino, comprising part of the Tōkai region, suffered major flooding, washing away more than 300 peasants and 1,000 horse and cattle. In addition, 19 Buddhist temple buildings were destroyed.
- December 8, 775 (O.S. December 4): A strong typhoon struck the provinces of Hyūga and Satsuma. Manabe & Kawakatsu (1968) estimated the windspeed at 35.0 m/s (126 km/h; 78 mph; 68.0 kn).
- October 18, 776 (O.S. October 14): A strong typhoon struck Iki Province. Manabe & Kawakatsu (1968) estimated the windspeed at 25.0 m/s (90 km/h; 56 mph; 48.6 kn).
- August 777: A typhoon impacted Tosa Province, damaging houses and rice crops. People and livestock were swept away along the Niyodo River.
- 779: A typhoon struck Yamato Province.
- Between 779 and 798: Analysis of resin freckles in yakusugi cedar trees indicate that an intense typhoon with estimated winds of 57.8 m/s (208 km/h; 129 mph; 112.4 kn) struck Yakushima.
- 785: During the seventh and eighth lunar months (between August 14 and October 11), typhoons impacted the provinces of Tōtōmi, Shimousa, Hitachi, and Noto, destroying crops and causing a famine. On November 20, envoys were sent to provide shingō to affected areas.
- September 16, 796 (O.S. September 12): A typhoon caused flooding in Chikuzen Province, and shingō was provided.

=== 800–999 ===
- September 5, 817 (O.S. September 1): A powerful typhoon, known as Settsu Ōkaze (摂津大風; lit. 'Great Wind of Settsu'), produced storm surges in Settsu Province along Osaka Bay, killing 220 people.
- Mid-August 819: A typhoon affected Kyoto.
- Early June 836: A typhoon affected Kyoto.
- Between 845 and 868: Analysis of resin freckles in yakusugi cedar trees indicate that an intense typhoon with estimated winds of 53.5 m/s (193 km/h; 120 mph; 104.0 kn) struck Yakushima.
- Late July 847: A typhoon affected Kyoto.
- September 7–9, 848 (O.S. September 3–5): A likely typhoon brought heavy rain and flooding to Kyoto and surrounding regions. Rain poured throughout the night of September 7 and intensified on September 8 "as though a well were turned upside down." On September 9, numerous sections of embankment along Yodo River were breached, including the Manda Embankment, and floodwater swept away people and horses. Yamasaki Bridge, built across the Katsura River, was washed away and only an 11-metre (36 ft) long section remained. The floodwater reached a depth 1.2–1.5 metres (3.9–4.9 ft) deeper than during a prior flood in 806, according to the elderly who remembered the event.
- Mid-June 850: A typhoon affected Kyoto.
- June 19, 858 (O.S. June 15): A strong typhoon impacted Kyushu. Government buildings were razed to the ground and crop seedlings were devastated. Manabe & Kawakatsu (1968) estimated the windspeed at 35.0 m/s (126 km/h; 78 mph; 68.0 kn).
- Late July 859: A typhoon affected Kyoto.
- Mid-August 860: A typhoon affected Kyoto.
- October 6–7, 860 (O.S. October 2–3): On October 6, a typhoon struck the Kinki Region, snapping large trees and destroying numerous houses in Kyoto. Heavy rain continued throughout the following day and the Katsura and Kamo rivers overflowed, rendering them impassable on foot or by horse. Coastal areas of the Kinai Region, particularly along Osaka Bay, suffered storm surges, causing human and livestock losses.
- July 16, 865 (O.S. July 12): The Nihon Sandai Jitsuroku records a typhoon that destroyed houses and snapped trees in Kyoto. Two of the doors were toppled at Kenrei-mon Gate, one of the gates of Heian Palace's Dairi.
- May 866: The provinces of Owari and Awa (modern-day Tokushima Prefecture) were flooded by a typhoon, bringing upon a famine in both regions. In Awa, 80,000 soku of rice were supplied to the masses as disaster relief.
- August 29, 869 (O.S. August 25): A typhoon impacted Higo Province, blowing tiles off of roofs, uprooting trees, and demolishing many buildings. A storm surge struck six coastal counties of the province, killing numerous people and livestock.
- Between 871 and 878: Analysis of resin freckles in yakusugi cedar trees indicate that an intense typhoon with estimated winds of 56.0 m/s (202 km/h; 125 mph; 108.9 kn) struck Yakushima.
- October 12, 874 (O.S. October 8): A violent storm, most likely a typhoon, caused the Kamo, Katsura, and Takase rivers to breach their banks, flooding an area spanning from central Heian-kyō to the middle reaches of Yodo River. Floodwater washed away all of the bridges, reaching a depth of 2–2.5 metres (6.6–8.2 ft), which was reportedly higher than during the typhoon on September 7–9, 848 by at least 1.8 metres (5.9 ft). Numerous people and livestock were swept away and drowned, some along with their houses. Many trees were snapped and uprooted, and almost all of the government buildings and people's houses were damaged or destroyed.
- Mid-August 875: A typhoon affected Kyoto.
- Late July 899: A typhoon affected Kyoto.
- Early June 910: A typhoon affected Kyoto.
- September 8, 913 (O.S. September 3): A typhoon struck Japan and strong winds began to blow in the evening.
- August 23, 915 (O.S. August 18): A 1998 study proposed that a possible northerly-moving typhoon offshore the Sanriku region may have caused the volcanic ash released during the 915 eruption of Lake Towada to flow southward rather than be spread east by the westerlies aloft.
- Late June 916: A typhoon affected Kyoto.
- September 26, 944 (O.S. September 21): An intense typhoon rolled through the Kinki and Chūbu regions, destroying numerous government buildings within the Daidairi and people's houses within Heian-kyō. In Shinano Province, Kami (守) Ki no Fumimoto was killed when the government office building collapsed on top of him.
- Late July 947: A typhoon affected Kyoto.
- Late July 957: A typhoon affected Kyoto.
- Circa September 24–25, 957 (O.S. September 19–20): Michitsuna's mother mentions a typhoon that struck Kyoto in Kagerō Nikki.
- Between 958 and 978: Analysis of resin freckles in yakusugi cedar trees indicate that an intense typhoon with estimated winds of 49.8 m/s (179 km/h; 111 mph; 96.8 kn) struck Yakushima.
- Mid-August 961: A typhoon affected Kyoto.
- October 6, 962 (O.S. October 1): A typhoon damaged government buildings, Shinto shrines, Buddhist temples, and many houses in the provinces of Yamato and Ōmi among others in the Kinki Region. Damage was reported in major temples including Tōdai-ji, Kōfuku-ji, Shin-Yakushi-ji, and Saidai-ji.
- Late July 966: A typhoon affected Kyoto.
- June 25, 973 (O.S. June 20): A violent storm, possibly an early-season typhoon, damaged the buildings housing the Mokuryō (a government office in charge of construction within the Heian Palace). This event, alongside an earthquake (date unspecified), droughts in 972, fires in Yakushi-ji and Kitano Tenmangū in April 973, and persistent rain in October 973 may have contributed to the era name change from Tenroku to Ten'en in January 974.
- Mid-July 976: A typhoon affected Kyoto.
- Between 979 and 988: Analysis of resin freckles in yakusugi cedar trees indicate that a typhoon with estimated winds of 39.0 m/s (140 km/h; 87 mph; 75.8 kn) struck Yakushima.
- Autumn 980: Typhoons and floods affected Japan according to the Nihon Kiryaku.
- October 6, 982 (O.S. October 1): A typhoon affected Kyoto.
- 984: During the eighth lunar month (between September 3 and October 2), a typhoon affected Etchū Province.
- October 1, 988 (O.S. September 26): A typhoon struck Kii Province, causing widespread river and coastal flooding. (Note: This typhoon occurred on "Eien 2, 13th day of the eighth month" (永延2年8月13日). One of the sources has a typographical error and states the date as "Eien 2, 31st day of the eighth month" (永延2年8月31日), which does not exist (the eighth month of Eien 2 (988) has only 30 days).)
- September 20, 989 (O.S. September 15): An exceptionally powerful typhoon known as Eiso-no-Kaze (永祚の風; lit. 'Storm of Eiso Era') in Japan, possibly similar to the infamous 1934 Muroto typhoon in track and intensity, struck Kyoto and caused severe damage in Heian-kyō and across Japan, destroying numerous buildings and killing many, which was described as an "unprecedented disaster" in Fusō Ryakuki. Strong winds damaged vegetation as far as Echigo Province. Following the calamity, the era name was changed from Eiso to Shōryaku in December 990.
- September 24, 990 (O.S. September 19): A typhoon affected Kyoto.
- September 18, 998 (O.S. September 13): A typhoon affected Kyoto.

=== 1000–1199 ===
- September 26–27, 1002 (O.S. September 20–21): A typhoon struck Kyoto during the night, damaging buildings in the Dairi as well as some houses. A typhoon depicted in The Tale of Genji was likely modeled after this storm, given that it occurred during the writing of the novel and that the calculated moon position after the storm matches perfectly with the description within.
- October 2, 1003 (O.S. September 26): A typhoon struck the Kinki Region at night, causing major damage in Ise Grand Shrine. This is most likely the same storm mentioned in Izumi Shikibu's diary (Izumi Shikibu Nikki).
- Early July 1005: A typhoon affected Kyoto.
- Early August 1009: A typhoon affected Kyoto.
- July 6, 1012 (O.S. June 30): Fujiwara no Sanesuke recorded a typhoon that brought fierce winds and heavy rain to Kyoto in his diary Shōyūki.
- September 23, 1014 (O.S. September 17): A typhoon affected Kyoto.
- Mid-June 1015: A typhoon affected Kyoto.
- September 30, 1015 (O.S. September 24): A typhoon affected Kyoto.
- August 18, 1016 (O.S. August 12) (Note: The source lists the date as "Chōwa 5, seventh day of the seventh month" (長和5年7月7日), which corresponds to August 18, 1016, but erroneously lists the Gregorian calendar date as August 25, 1010, which is "Kankō 7, seventh day of the seventh month" (寛弘7年7月7日) in the old Japanese calendar.): According to Fujiwara no Michinaga's diary Midō Kanpakuki, a typhoon lashed Kyoto with strong winds and heavy rain that began early in the morning and intensified into the night.
- September 20, 1016 (O.S. September 14): A typhoon affected Kyoto.
- November 5, 1019 (O.S. October 30): An unusually late typhoon affected Kyoto. This is the only known instance of a November typhoon to have struck Kyoto between the 9th and 11th centuries.
- Mid-August 1020: A typhoon affected Kyoto.
- September 18, 1020 (O.S. September 12): A typhoon affected Kyoto.
- Late July 1023: A typhoon affected Kyoto.
- October 6, 1026 (O.S. September 30): A typhoon affected Kyoto.
- September 14–15, 1027 (O.S. September 8–9): A typhoon affected Kyoto.
- 1028: During the eighth lunar month (between August 29 and September 26), two typhoons impacted the Kinai Region amid persistent rain, causing wind and flood damage.
- September 28, 1028 (O.S. September 22): A typhoon struck Kyoto and blew down numerous buildings. The easternmost part of Heian-kyō was inundated, east of Tominokōji along the Kamo River, as was Tsuchimikado-dono (also known as Jōtōmon-in) and Hōjō-ji.
- September 29 – October 1, 1034 (O.S. September 23–25): A destructive typhoon rolled through Kyoto, uprooting trees and razing buildings within the Daidairi, shrines, temples, and many houses. The Kamo River breached its banks, flooding an area between Yodo and Yamazaki (now Ōyamazaki, Kyoto). Many people and horses died, mostly under collapsed buildings or washed away by the flood. Household goods and boats were also swept away. Damage from the storm was said to be comparable to that caused by the Eiso-no-Kaze typhoon in 989.
- September 13, 1092 (O.S. September 7): The Fusō Ryakuki mentions a typhoon that caused flooding across Japan, submerging swaths of farmland and killing numerous peasants.
- Early August 1095: A typhoon affected Kyoto.
- September 19, 1097 (O.S. September 13): A typhoon in Kyoto destroyed many houses, uprooted most trees, and killed many peasants. This event was named as one of the reasons for the era change from Eichō to Jōtoku in January 1098.
- September 11, 1098 (O.S. September 5): A typhoon caused widespread flooding in Awa Province along the Yoshino River. The village of Hatta was separated from the mainland, becoming the island of Ichinoshima.
- May 25, 1111 (O.S. May 18): An unusually early typhoon affected Kyoto.
- Mid-August 1113: A typhoon affected Kyoto.
- September 3, 1115 (O.S. August 27): A typhoon struck Kyoto and caused severe widespread flooding, devastating harvests.
- August 26, 1117 (O.S. August 19): A typhoon struck Kyoto, bringing heavy rain. Fujiwara no Tadazane expressed relief as the storm alleviated a drought that lasted through June and July, though it likely contributed to a famine that took place in 1118–1119.
- October 5, 1117 (O.S. September 28): A typhoon struck Kyoto, uprooting trees and destroying houses. Much like the August 1117 typhoon, it likely contributed to the 1118–1119 famine.
- Between 1118 and 1156: Analysis of resin freckles in yakusugi cedar trees indicate that an intense typhoon with estimated winds of 70.1 m/s (252 km/h; 157 mph; 136.3 kn) struck Yakushima. Yamaguchi et al. (2012) estimates the year of the event at 1130.
- Mid-July 1119: A typhoon affected Kyoto.
- Early August 1119: A typhoon affected Kyoto.
- Mid-August 1125: A typhoon affected Kyoto.
- October 22, 1130 (O.S. October 15): A strong typhoon hit Kawachi and surrounding provinces. Manabe & Kawakatsu (1968) estimated the windspeed at 45.0 m/s (162 km/h; 101 mph; 87.5 kn).
- Early August 1131: A typhoon affected Kyoto.
- Early July 1134: A typhoon affected Kyoto.
- Early July 1144: A typhoon affected Kyoto.
- Mid-August 1144: A typhoon affected Kyoto.
- Mid-August 1151: A typhoon affected Kyoto.
- Early August 1159: A typhoon affected Kyoto.
- Early August 1176: A typhoon affected Kyoto.
- Mid-August 1176: A typhoon affected Kyoto.
- Late July 1177: A typhoon affected Kyoto.
- November 15, 1177 (O.S. November 8): A remarkably late typhoon lashed Kyoto with strong winds and heavy rain accompanied by thunder throughout the night, likely flooding a large portion of Heian-kyō.
- Late June 1182: A typhoon affected Kyoto.
- Late July 1182: A typhoon affected Kyoto.
- Late July 1187: A typhoon affected Kyoto.

=== 1200–1399 ===
- September 16, 1201 (O.S. September 9): A strong typhoon swept through the Kantō region. Heavy rains began to fall in the morning, followed by strong winds in the afternoon. Winds and floods destroyed people's homes and ships capsized along the coast.
- September 28, 1201 (O.S. September 21): Another typhoon similar to the September 16 storm struck the Kantō region, causing severe crop damage.
- Mid-August 1206: A typhoon affected Kyoto.
- August 7, 1207 (O.S. July 31): A typhoon brought strong winds and heavy rain to Kyoto, the first of six successive storms to batter Japan during the year.
- August 21, 1207 (O.S. August 14): A typhoon rolled through Japan. Strong winds and heavy rain were recorded in Kyoto and Kamakura.
- August 25, 1207 (O.S. August 18): A typhoon brought strong winds and heavy rain to Kyoto.
- September 16, 1207 (O.S. September 9): A typhoon rolled through Japan. Strong winds and heavy rain were recorded in Kyoto and Kamakura.
- October 4, 1207 (O.S. September 27): A typhoon brought strong winds and heavy rain to Kyoto.
- October 13, 1207 (O.S. October 6): The last of the six typhoons to strike the nation in 1207, a typhoon brought strong winds and heavy rain to Kyoto. Due to these storms as well as multiple disease outbreaks, including a smallpox epidemic that took place in summer and autumn, the era name was changed from Ken'ei to Jōgen in November of that year.
- Late June 1212: A typhoon affected Kyoto.
- October 18, 1216 (O.S. October 11): A typhoon destroyed buildings and houses in Sanuki Province.
- Mid-June 1217: A typhoon affected Kyoto.
- October 9–13, 1224 (O.S. October 2–6): A typhoon uprooted large trees and destroyed buildings in Tosa Shrine.
- Early June 1226: A typhoon affected Kyoto.
- Mid-August 1226: A typhoon affected Kyoto.
- August 28–29, 1228 (O.S. August 21–22): A severe storm, likely a typhoon, impacted Kyoto. The Kamo River breached its banks on August 28, washing away the Shijō and Gojō bridges. Flooding continued on the 29th, wiping out the tamagaki around Kamo Shrine and the haiden of Kifune Shrine. Numerous houses around Kamo Shrine were swept away, drowning many. The flooding was reportedly the worst since the Eishō era (1046–1053).
- November 12, 1228 (O.S. November 5): A typhoon moved through Japan. In the afternoon, intense southwesterly wind was recorded in Kyoto, damaging houses and trees. Pagodas were blown down in temples, including the nine-storied pagoda at Hosshō-ji. The typhoon passed near Kamakura in the evening, destroying government buildings and the mansion of Take no gosho (the daughter of Minamoto no Yoriie). A pillar blown away from a house struck and killed several pedestrians. This storm, along with the typhoon in August, was responsible for the era name change from Antei to Kangi.
- Early July 1230: A typhoon affected Kyoto.
- September 23, 1230 (O.S. September 16): A typhoon swept through Japan, destroying crops. This, combined with an unusually cold summer and warm winter that caused both rice and wheat crops to fail, culminated in a nationwide famine in 1231.
- Mid-July 1232: A typhoon affected Kyoto.
- November 1, 1232 (O.S. October 25): A late-season typhoon affected Kyoto.
- May 16–17, 1233 (O.S. May 9–10): An atypically early typhoon struck the Kinki Region, catching the townsfolk off-guard. Winds that began to blow around noon of May 16 grew stronger into the night, knocking down trees on Mount Kasuga and shaking and destroying houses. Dirt walls and tileless roofs were blown down, as was the Sōheki-mon Gate of Heian Palace. Former Kampaku (regent) Kujō Michiie had to delay his devotional offering at Kasuga-taisha. Around midnight, the fierce winds subsided in Kasuga-taisha, only to resume within a few hours, implying that the center of the storm passed over Nara at this time before moving eastward. On May 18, one of the halls at Hōjō-ji collapsed, killing one person who was inside. Flooding was recorded between Kyoto and Nara.
- Mid-August 1238: A typhoon affected Kyoto.
- Mid-August 1240: A typhoon affected Kyoto.
- Early June 1242: A typhoon affected Kyoto.
- Mid-August 1242: A typhoon affected Kyoto.
- Early August 1245: A typhoon affected Kyoto.
- Early August 1247: A typhoon affected Kyoto.
- Mid-June 1251: A typhoon affected Kyoto.
- September 2, 1254 (O.S. August 26): A fierce typhoon struck the Niyodo River basin in Tosa Province. Heavy rains lasted until September 8.
- 1256: In the eighth lunar month (between August 29 and September 26), a typhoon in Kamakura caused damage to rice paddies.
- 1258: A typhoon struck Japan, which compounded the damage from persistent rain and low temperatures, causing the Shōka famine.
- September 6, 1258 (O.S. August 30): Sanuki Province was lashed with strong winds, followed by heavy rain and flooding on September 7.
- October 7, 1263 (O.S. September 30): A typhoon produced fierce winds from the afternoon into the night, sinking many vessels offshore the Izu Peninsula and Sagami Bay. Off the coast of Izu, 61 boats carrying rice and other annual tributes were sunk. Many ships docked at Yuigahama were also capsized, killing many of the occupants, and numerous bodies washed ashore.
- September 5, 1265 (O.S. August 29): A typhoon brought violent winds and heavy rain to Tosa Province, causing landslides.
- Early June 1271: A typhoon affected Kyoto.
- November 26, 1274 (O.S. November 19): The first of the kamikaze storms struck the Yuan fleet, sinking many vessels. The Goryeosa states that 13,500 perished either during the storm or in battle, about 40% of the fleet's manpower. Among the dead was the commander of the Goryeo fleet. Most Japanese studies dismiss the possibility of this event being caused by a typhoon due to it having occurred so late in the year and the lack of storm descriptions in reliable sources, either ascribing the damage to an extratropical cyclone or the winter monsoon. However, a 2014 study identified a storm deposit matching the timeframe of the 1274 event in the sediments in Lake Daija in Amakusa, which was likely caused by a typhoon of Category 3-equivalent strength or higher in the Saffir–Simpson scale.
- August 10, 1281 (O.S. August 3): A typhoon brought violent winds and heavy rain to Tosa Province, causing landslides.
- August 22–23, 1281 (O.S. August 15–16): The second of the kamikaze storms, a fierce typhoon struck the Yuan fleet in the Tsushima Straits, lasting two whole days. According to contemporary Japanese accounts, over 4,000 ships out of the initial 4,400 were destroyed in the storm. 80% of the Yuan soldiers either drowned or were killed by samurai on the beaches, totaling over 100,000. The loss of ships was so great that "a person could walk across from one point of land to another on a mass of wreckage".
- Late June 1284: A typhoon affected Kyoto.
- Mid-July 1286: A typhoon affected Kyoto.
- Mid-July 1291: A typhoon affected Kyoto.
- Early August 1302: A typhoon affected Kyoto.
- Late June 1309: A typhoon affected Kyoto.
- Late July 1309: A typhoon affected Kyoto.
- August 24, 1309 (O.S. August 16): A typhoon struck the provinces of Owari and Mikawa, causing damage to manors, temples, and Sanage Shrine.
- Mid-August 1314: A typhoon affected Kyoto.
- Late June 1320: A typhoon affected Kyoto.
- Early June 1321: A typhoon affected Kyoto.
- November 7, 1331 (O.S. October 30): A late-season typhoon affected Kyoto.
- 1335 (Note: Another source states that this typhoon took place in 1334, which places it before the Nakasendai Rebellion.): A typhoon struck Kamakura and collapsed the Great Buddha Hall at Kōtoku-in temple, killing 500 people within, who had sought refuge there from the capture of Kamakura by Hōjō Tokiyuki during the Nakasendai Rebellion.
- November 12, 1339 (O.S. November 4): A late-season typhoon affected Kyoto.
- 1342: A typhoon hit Iyo Province.
- Early June 1347: A typhoon affected Kyoto.
- Late July 1349: A typhoon affected Kyoto.
- Early July 1350: A typhoon affected Kyoto.
- Mid-August 1350: A typhoon affected Kyoto.
- Mid-June 1352: A typhoon affected Kyoto.
- May 16, 1353 (O.S. May 8): A very early typhoon affected Kyoto.
- Early August 1355: A typhoon affected Kyoto.
- Mid-August 1355: A typhoon affected Kyoto.
- September 17, 1356 (O.S. September 9): Nobleman Konoe Michitsugu mentions a typhoon that struck Kyoto in his diary Gukanki. Rain poured throughout the day, and strong winds blew through the night.
- Early July 1359: A typhoon affected Kyoto.
- March 25, 1366 (O.S. March 17): A typhoon hit Sanuki Province.
- Late July 1366: A typhoon affected Kyoto.
- April 14, 1367 (O.S. April 6): A typhoon hit Sanuki Province.
- 1369: The Great Buddha Hall at Kōtoku-in was again destroyed in a typhoon. While the building was rebuilt thereafter, it no longer exists after it was destroyed for the final time in an earthquake in 1498. The Buddha statue itself survives to this day with a few repairs.
- August 3, 1375 (O.S. July 26): A typhoon hit Sanuki Province.
- September 17, 1375 (O.S. September 9): A typhoon hit Sanuki Province, causing crop damage.
- 1390: A typhoon struck Sanuki Province in the midst of a drought.

=== 1400–1599 ===
- Between 1403 and 1415: Analysis of resin freckles in yakusugi cedar trees indicate that an intense typhoon with estimated winds of 60.5 m/s (218 km/h; 135 mph; 117.6 kn) struck Yakushima.
- September 3, 1405 (O.S. August 25): A strong typhoon swept across mainland Japan. Manabe & Kawakatsu (1968) estimated the windspeed at 37.5 m/s (135 km/h; 84 mph; 72.9 kn).
- October 2, 1405 (O.S. September 23): A strong typhoon swept across mainland Japan. Manabe & Kawakatsu (1968) estimated the windspeed at 37.5 m/s (135 km/h; 84 mph; 72.9 kn).
- Autumn 1419: A typhoon caused severe damage in Sanuki Province.
- October 18, 1424 (O.S. October 9): A typhoon produced strong winds and rain in the morning, according to Kanmon Nikki.
- September 13, 1430 (O.S. September 4): Sanuki Province suffered strong winds and heavy rain.
- October 2, 1431 (O.S. September 23): Sanuki Province suffered strong winds and heavy rain.
- 1441: In the eighth lunar month (between August 26 and September 24), a typhoon struck Japan. This, combined with the floods in the fifth lunar month (between May 30 and June 27) and a measles outbreak, contributed to the Kakitsu uprising, calling for debt cancellation.
- 1445: A typhoon swept across Japan.
- 1447: A typhoon struck Japan.
- 1449: A typhoon produced flooding along the Kiso Three Rivers. The Wakita Embankment (脇田堤) was breached in Takasu Wajū, a wajū that existed in the present-day city of Kaizu, submerging the wajū in 4.45 metres (14.6 ft) (Note: Original text states depth as 1 jō 4 shaku 7 sun (1丈4尺7寸), which converts to 4.45 meters (1×3.030...+4×0.303...+7×0.030...=4.454...).) of water.
- August 26, 1450 (O.S. August 17): The provinces of Suō and Nagato were struck by an exceptionally powerful typhoon, which was said to be comparable to the 989 typhoon, damaging houses and castles.
- 1459: A typhoon struck Japan. This event, combined with droughts in 1459 and heavy rain, floods, low temperatures, and locusts in 1460, contributed to the deadly Kanshō famine.
- September 23, 1460 (O.S. September 14): A typhoon hit Sanuki Province in the midst of a drought, causing rice crops to not bear fruit.
- September 7, 1465 (O.S. August 29): A typhoon that struck Kyushu brought storm surges that caused coastal inundation in Hizen Province near the Ariake Sea, where people got around by boat for a distance of three li. (Note: At the time, the unit li (里) referred to two different lengths (about 600 m and about 4 km), and it is unclear as to which is being used in the source publication. As the shorter definition (Komichi (小道)) was commonly used in East Japan and the longer one (Ōmichi (大道)) in the west, it is likely that records on the disaster, which occurred in Kyushu, used the long li. If this is the case, the recorded distance is equivalent to roughly 12 kilometers.)
- 1467: In the eighth lunar month (between September 8 and October 7), a typhoon produced stormy conditions and flooding in Hokkaido (then called Ezo), sinking many ships offshore Matsumae Peninsula. This is the oldest recorded typhoon to strike Hokkaido.
- September 15–16, 1475 (O.S. September 6–7): A typhoon struck Sanuki Province and caused severe flooding in modern-day Hyogo Prefecture between Amagasaki and Akashi.
- September 5, 1495 (O.S. August 27): Ise Province was struck by a typhoon and suffered severe flooding, which killed at least 50. Several bridges within Ise Grand Shrine were washed away. Prolific haikai poet Arakida Moritake and his brother Moritoki were caught in the floods as their house was swept away with them inside, but both survived.
- 1502: During the eighth lunar month (between September 12 and October 10), a probable typhoon affected Japan, damaging crops with strong winds amid an ongoing famine that took place between June 1501 and 1505.
- September 1512: Storm surges produced by a typhoon washed away the entire settlement of Shishikuiura, Kaifu District, Tokushima, and only a third of the residents survived.
- August 10, 1517 (O.S. July 31): A typhoon caused major floods that laid waste on farmland across Japan. This, combined with crop damage due to an early frost on October 10, 1518, brought about a severe famine that lasted through 1518 and 1519.
- June 1534: A typhoon struck Tosa Province during the rainy season, blowing down houses.
- September 21, 1540 (O.S. September 11): A crippling famine that lasted through 1540 and 1541 was worsened by a typhoon that carved its path through Japan from Kansai all the way to Aizu (now western Fukushima Prefecture), causing devastating crop damage.
- July 19, 1544 (O.S. July 9): A typhoon struck Sanuki Province.
- August 6–7, 1544 (O.S. July 27–28): A typhoon struck Sanuki Province and the Kinki and Tokai regions. In Kyoto, numerous people and horses, the gates of most houses, the Shijō and Gojō bridges, and a large Torii gate in Gion were washed away. A large portion of the city was inundated, forcing people to travel by boat between Nandaimon Gate (南大門) of Tō-ji and Yotsuzukacho (四ツ塚町) (in modern-day Minami-ku). Ōmiya Bridge at Hiyoshi Taisha was swept away. Many monks as well as dozens of children and young men were wiped out in Enryaku-ji, possibly due to a landslide in Mount Hiei. In Mikawa Province, most houses were washed away and many people and livestock were killed.
- September 16, 1544 (O.S. September 6): A typhoon struck Sanuki Province.
- Autumn 1546: The Nii District Chronicles list a typhoon that struck Iyo Province during the harvest season, causing great damage. This, however, is considered dubious due to the unreliability of the chronicles.
- September 5, 1554 (O.S. August 26): A typhoon affected modern-day Hiroshima Prefecture.
- October 25, 1555 (O.S. October 15): The day before the Battle of Miyajima, a likely typhoon produced stormy conditions around Miyajima, which warlord Mōri Motonari capitalized on to conceal his approach towards Sue Harukata's forces, successfully defeating him in the following battle.
- September 28, 1557 (O.S. September 18): A typhoon struck the Kinki Region and brought strong winds from the east and then from the south, producing deadly storm surges across the northern coast of Osaka Bay much like the Settsu Ōkaze typhoon in September 817. Damage was particularly severe in modern-day Hyogo Prefecture; 61 drowned in Amagasaki (a part of modern-day Amagasaki City) alone. The Miya River in Ise Province breached its banks, washing away nearby houses and trees. The five-storied pagoda at Tō-ji became slanted due to the fierce wind.
- October 4, 1573 (O.S. September 24): A typhoon hit Sanuki Province, bringing strong winds and flooding.

== See also ==
- Typhoons in Japan
- List of Pacific typhoons before 1850
