= Yūtenji =

Buddhist temple in Tokyo, Japan

Coordinates: 35°38′11″N 139°41′48″E

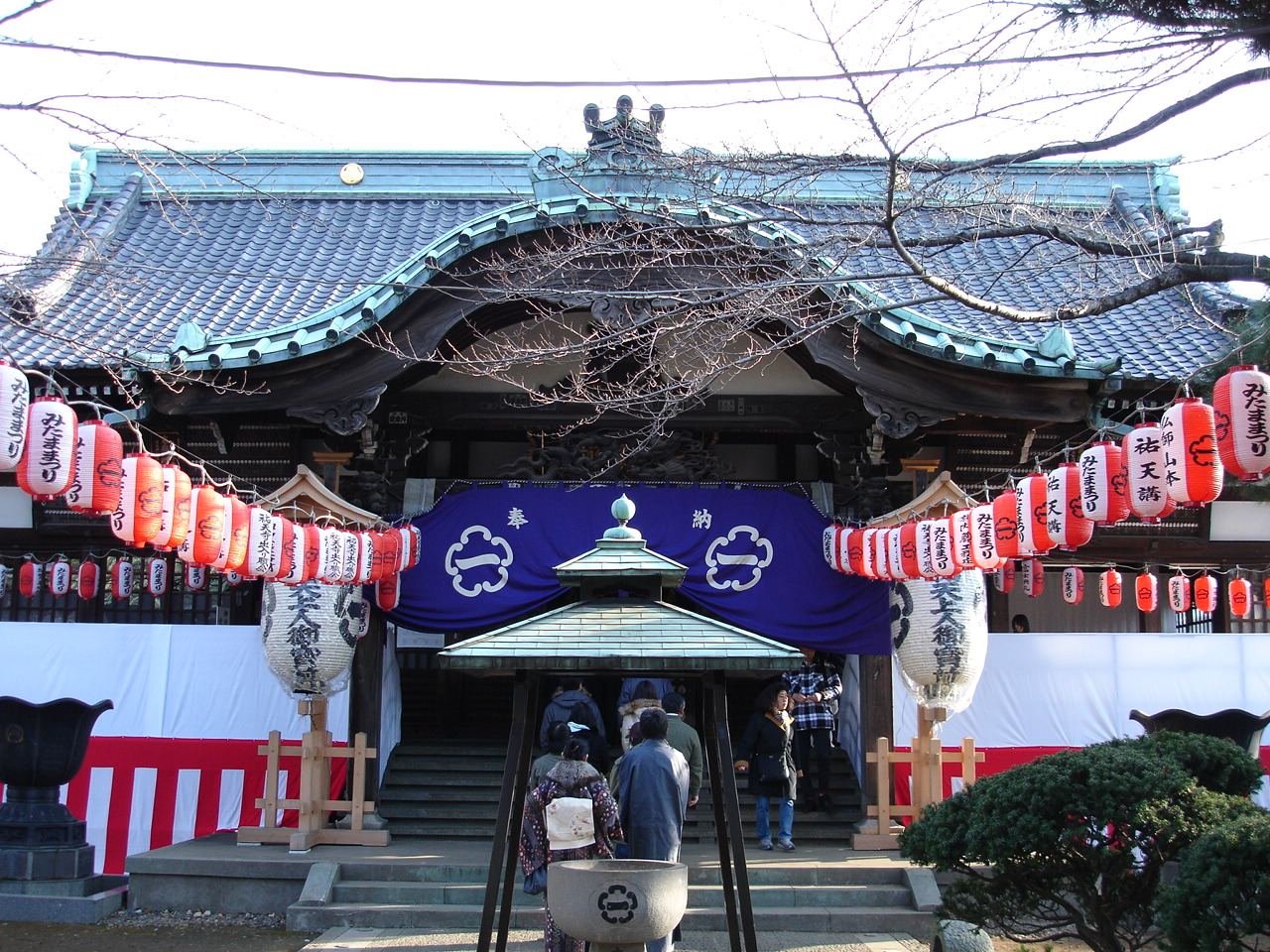
New Year's Shrine Visit at Yūtenji

Yūtenji (祐天寺, yūtenji) is a temple of the Jōdo-shū Buddhist sect in Nakameguro, Meguro, Tokyo, Japan.

== History ==
The temple was founded in 1718, the 3rd year of the Kyōhō era. After the 36th Buddhist monk of Zōjōji called Yūten died, one of his disciples, Yumi (祐海, yumi), built Yūtenji as his shrine. It was built in an architectural style characteristic of the Edo period, finished in 1724 and later renovated twice in 1854 and 1932.

Meguro City designated the temple as a historic site in 1993.

=== Korean remains ===
The temple has been a longstanding resting place for Koreans including soldiers who fought for Japan during World War II and victims of the 1945 sinking of the repatriation ship Ukishima Maru. The Japanese government interred 521 Ukishima Maru victims' remains there in 1971 alongside remains of Korean soldiers and others.

The South Korean government has worked with Japan to repatriate many of these sets of remains, particularly since the 2000s. As the North Korean government has no diplomatic relations with Japan, there have been no successful negotiations to repatriate North Korean remains. As of 2020, the temple stores the bones of about 700 Koreans, over half of whom are North Korean.

== Transport ==
5 minutes walk from Yūtenji railway station on the Tokyu Toyoko Line.
