= Yūten =

Edo period Buddhist monk and exorcist

- 祐天
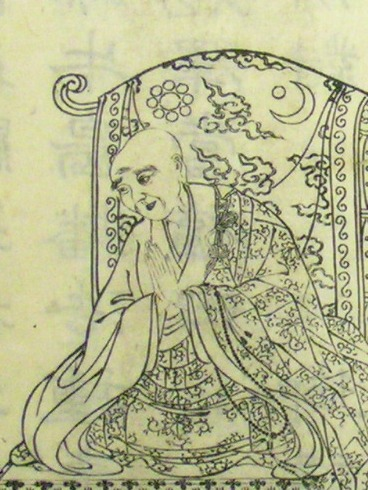

Personal life
- Born: April 8, 1637
- Died: August 11, 1718 (aged 81)

Religious life
- Religion: Buddhism
- Temple: Yūtenji
- School: Jōdo-shū, Chinzei

Yūten (祐天, April 8, 1637 – August 11, 1718) was the 36th head priest of Zōjō-ji, the head temple of the Jōdo-shū, and a leading exorcist of the Edo Period.

Although he was not a monk of the Shingon school, traditionally known for exorcisms, legend has it that he rescued people who were attacked by powerful vengeful spirits and guided those spirits to the Pure Land of Amida Buddha through the power of the Nembutsu. Legends of Yūten's exorcisms spread through popular publications written during his lifetime, such as Tales of the Liberation of the Dead (死霊解脱物語聞書). Later, in the popular sermons of the time and in biographies such as the Biography of Grand Monk Yūten (祐天大僧正御伝記) written in the mid-18th century, Yūten's exorcism tales were recounted as those of an incarnation of Jizō, and these stories continued to be popular among the common people for many generations.

== Biography ==
Yūten was born in Shinden Village (formerly Kami-Niida Village; present-day Kami-Niida, Yotsukura-machi, Iwaki City), Iwaki District, Mutsu Province (later Iwaki Province). At the age of 12, he became a disciple of Priest Danchū at Zōjō-ji Temple. He received the patronage of the fifth Shogun Tokugawa Tsunayoshi, his birth mother Keishō-in, and Tokugawa Ienobu. By order of the shogunate, he served successively as abbot of Daigan-ji Temple in Shimōsa Province, Kōgyō-ji Temple in the same province, and Daigan-ji Temple in Edo. In 1711, he became the 36th head priest of Zōjō-ji Temple and was appointed Grand Priest. In his later years, he retired to a hermitage in Ryudo-cho, Azabu, and performed many miraculous deeds until his death at the age of 82 in 1718. After his death, he was buried at Zenkyū-in (later Yūtenji) in Meguro.

With the support of a donation from the Asakusa merchant Nojima Shinzaemon (Taishu), he worked alongside Yōkoku to restore the Great Buddha of Kamakura, which had been left exposed and had fallen into disrepair since its halls were destroyed by the great earthquake of 1498. He then began the restoration of the Kamakura Daibutsu through recasting and reestablished it as Seijōsen-ji Kōtoku-in, a temple dedicated exclusively to the practice of Nembutsu. He positioned it as the “Okuno-in” of Kōmyō-ji, which at the time was the leading temple among the Jōdo-shū Kantō Jūhachi Danrin.

== Legends and Anecdotes ==
One of Yūten's most famous tales is The Record of the Story of the Liberation of the Dead Spirit at Kasane-ga-fuchi, which recounts how, while residing at Gugyoji Temple Temple in Iinuma Village, Shimosa Province, he helped the vengeful spirit of a woman named Kasane from Hanyu Village (present-day Hanyu-machi, Joso City, Ibaraki Prefecture) find peace and Ōjō. Many works have been created based on this legend, including Kyokutei Bakin’s story The New Tale of Kumoi’s Liberation and San'yūtei Enchō’s rakugo ghost story The True Scene of Kasane-ga-Fuchi.

Another famous tale about Yūten recounts a story of him as a young man. According to this legend, as a novice monk, Yūten was a terrible scholar, being unable to memorize the sutras, and vowed to Fudō Myōō to improve. That night, he dreamt he was visited by Fudō Myōō, who forced Yūten to swallow his sword. From then onward, Yūten became a gifted scholar who was able to learn with ease.
