= Ōno Gorōemon =

Japanese sculptor

"Great Buddha" (大仏 Daibutsu), bronze statue of Amitābha Buddha cast either by Ōno Gorōemon or Tanji Hisatomo, Kōtoku-in, designated a National Treasure of Japan, 1252

Ōno Gorōemon was a 13th-century Japanese sculptor. His exact date of birth and death are unknown.

Gorōemon was of the Kei school, which flourished in the Kamakura period. Aside from his artwork, Gorōemon left little record of his life. He is speculated as one of the possible casters (along with Tanji Hisatomo) of the "Great Buddha" (大仏 Daibutsu), a bronze statue of Amitābha Buddha at the Kōtoku-in temple around 1252.
