= Yakusugi =

Japanese cedar tree, or its wood

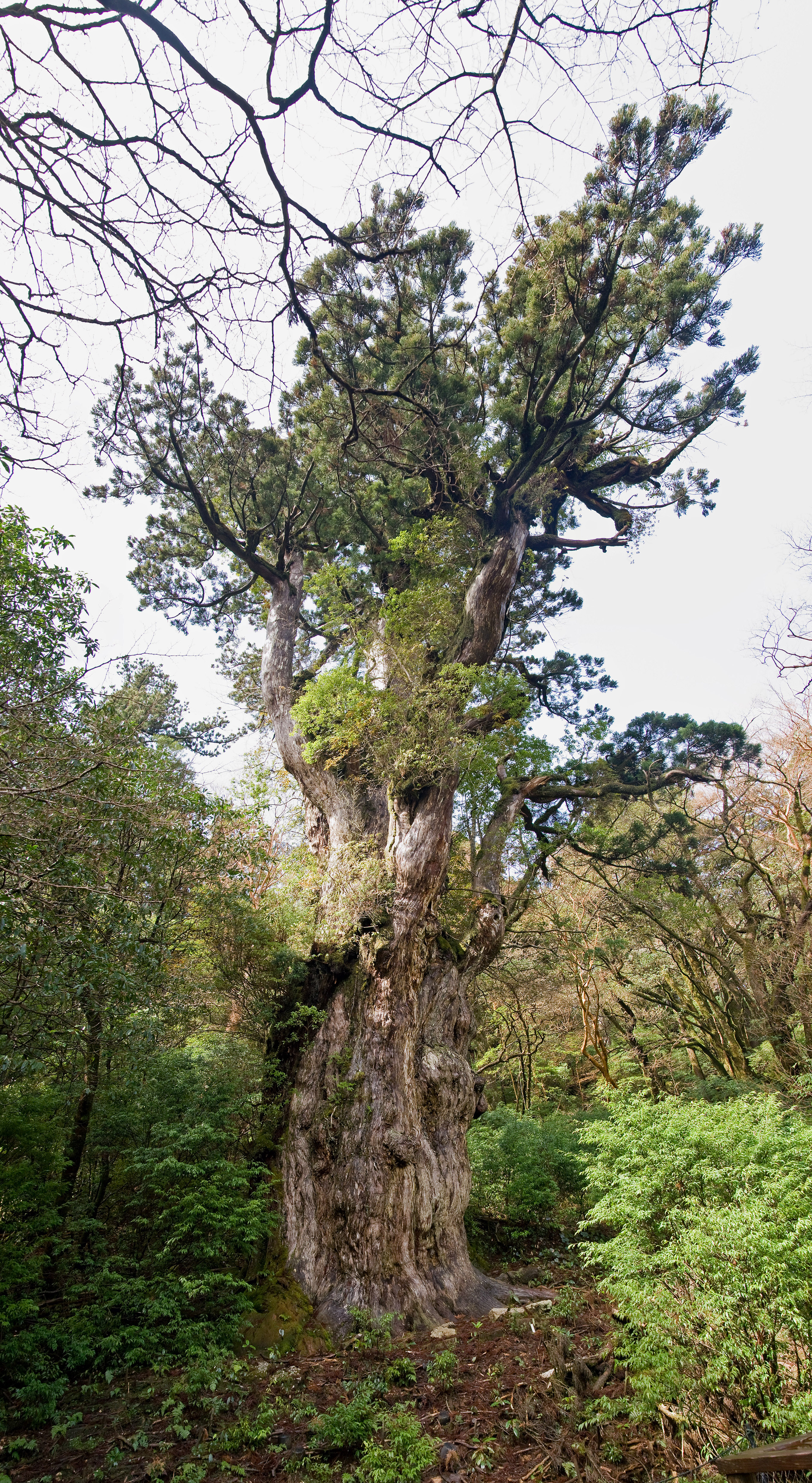
Yakusugi is the largest Sugi (Cryptomeria japonica) in Yakushima in southwest Japan.

Yakusugi (屋久杉) refers to "Japanese cedar" (sugi, or Cryptomeria) on the island of Yakushima, typically growing at altitudes 500 meters and higher. The term also extends to the lumber taken from the logging of these coniferous trees.

In the strict sense, the term Yakusugi is reserved for trees aged 1,000 years or more, and younger trees are referred to as kosugi ("small cedars"). Replanted cedars are called jisugi ("local cedars") by the Yakushima islanders, although jisugi also refers to trees less than a century old.

In general, the Japanese cedar lives for about 500 years, but yakusugi trees live much longer. They grow on less nutritious granite soil slowly and have a very tight grain. The wood contains a lot of resin due to Yakushima's high rainfall and high humidity, making it resistant to rotting. As a result, these trees tend to have longer lives, and many larger trees have survived for more than 2,000 years. Famous examples include the Jōmon Sugi, Kigen-sugi and Wilson stump.

== Logging ==
A stone monument from Kagoshima Shrine states that sugi and hinoki lumber from Yakushima were transported here to rebuild the shrine around 1560. This is the earliest known record of yakusugi being used for logging.

After Hideyoshi's subjugation of Kyushu, his commissioner Ishida Mitsunari ordered daimyō Shimazu Yoshihisa who governed Kagoshima (Satsuma Province) to conduct a survey of timber resources found in Yakushima, some time around 1590. Yakushima timbers carried on 11 vessels from Shōdoshima (an island in the Inland Sea) were sent to Kyoto for erecting the Daibutsu-den or "Great Buddha Hall" at the Hōkō-ji temple built by Hideyoshi. The "Wilson stump" is considered the result of logging at this time.

During the Edo period (1603–1868), Tomari Jochiku, a Nichiren sect monk and Confucian scholar born in Yakushima sought to lift his fellow islanders from economic plight by submitting a proposal to the Satsuma Domain whom he served, begging to allow commercial exploitation of the cedar on the island. Full-scale logging began around 1640.

Yakusugi was used in shipbuilding and architecture, although the bulk of them were manufactured into roof tiles called hiragi ("flat wood"). The islanders sent hiragi to the Satsuma domain as annual tribute. The surplus yakusugi beyond the tribute quota were purchased by the Satsuma clan in exchange for rice and other supplies.

The Meiji government (1868–1912) prohibited residents from cutting trees. The islanders sued unsuccessfully to gain back the woods, now designated a preserve. But ensuing poverty in Yakushima prompted the national Forestry Bureau's local office to announce "the plan for forest management in Yakushima" in 1921. Some of the main points included:

- The front of the mountain is solely for local profit.
- Local people may harvest trees for firewood and charcoal.
- Local hiring for logging, forestation, and gathering Trochodendron wood, the natural source of birdlime.
- Government funded gravel roads around Yakushima.

The court ruling finalized the decision to nationalize the forest, but logging commenced full swing. By 2001, all of the old growth wood in the National Forest had been cut down except in the protected zones, and commercial logging of natural yakusugi cedars has come to an end.

== Domaiboku ==
Since it is no longer permitted to cut Yakusugi today, souvenirs etc. are made from stumps of previously felled trees and trees that fell naturally in typhoons. These trees are called domaiboku (土埋木), which literally means buried trees in the ground.

== See also ==
- Jōmon Sugi
- Yakushima White Pine
- Ernest Henry Wilson - Wilson stump (ja)
