= Kōtoku-in =

Buddhist temple in Kamakura, Japan

Coordinates: 35°19′01″N 139°32′09″E

- 高徳院
- The Great Buddha at Kōtoku-in

Religion
- Affiliation: Jōdo-shū
- Deity: Amitābha

Location
- Location: 4 Chome-2-28 Hase, Kamakura, Kanagawa Prefecture 248-0016
- Country: Japan
- Interactive map of Kōtoku-in

Architecture
- Completed: 1252 (Daibutsu)

Website
- kotoku-in.jp/en

Kōtoku-in (高徳院) is a Buddhist temple of the Jōdo-shū sect in the city of Kamakura in Kanagawa Prefecture, Japan. Its mountain name is Daii-zan (大異山), and its common temple name is Shōjōsen-ji (清浄泉寺).

The temple is renowned for The Great Buddha of Kamakura (鎌倉大仏, Kamakura Daibutsu), a monumental outdoor bronze statue of Amitābha, which is one of the most famous icons of Japan. It is also a designated National Treasure, and one of the twenty-two historic sites included in Kamakura's proposal for inclusion in UNESCO's World Heritage Sites.

== Statue ==
The Great Buddha of Kamakura, cast in the 13th century

The Great Buddha of Kamakura (鎌倉大仏, Kamakura Daibutsu) is a large bronze statue of Amitābha, located on the temple grounds. Including the base, it measures 13.35 metres (43.8 ft) tall and weighs approximately 93 tonnes (103 tons). According to temple records, the statue dates from around 1252, during the Kamakura period, which it is named after.

The statue is hollow, and visitors can view the interior. Many visitors have left graffiti on the inside of the statue. At one time, there were thirty-two bronze lotus petals at the base of the statue, but only four remain, and they are no longer in place. A notice at the entrance to the grounds reads, "Stranger, whosoever thou art and whatsoever be thy creed, when thou enterest this sanctuary remember thou treadest upon ground hallowed by the worship of ages. This is the Temple of Buddha and the gate of the eternal, and should therefore be entered with reverence."

=== History ===
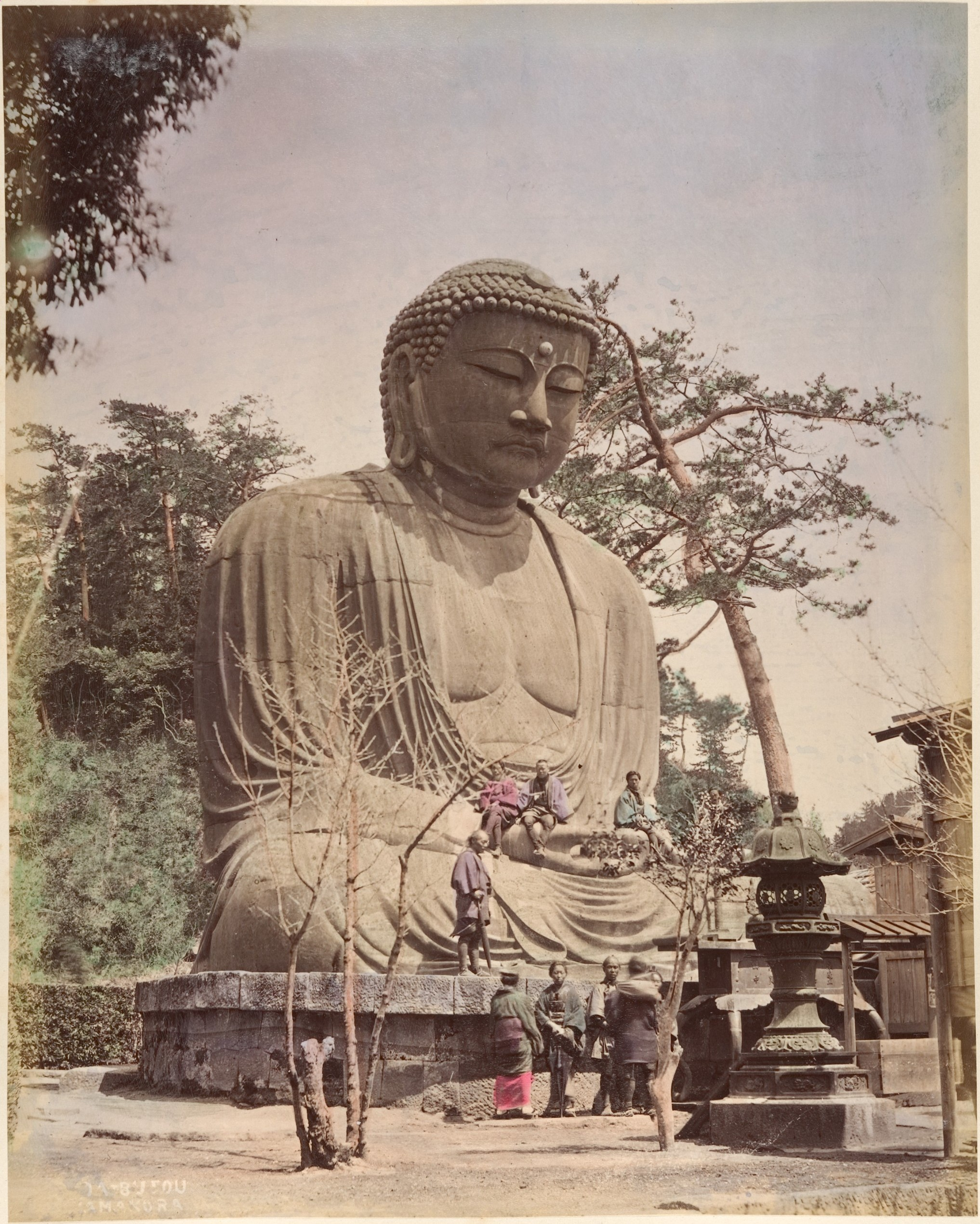
Photograph from the 1870s, by Suzuki Shinichi

The current bronze statue was preceded by a giant wooden Buddha, which was completed in 1243 after ten years of continuous labor, the funds having been raised by Lady Inada no Tsubone and the Buddhist priest Jōkō of Tōtōmi. The wooden statue was damaged by a storm in 1248, and the hall containing it was destroyed, so Jōkō suggested making a new statue of bronze, and the huge amount of money necessary for this and a new hall was raised for the project. The bronze image was probably cast by Ōno Gorōemon or Tanji Hisatomo, both leading casters of the time. At one time, the statue was gilded. There are still traces of gold leaf near the statue's ears.

The hall was destroyed by a storm in 1334, was rebuilt, was damaged by yet another storm in 1369, and was rebuilt yet again. The last building housing the statue was washed away in the tsunami resulting from the Nankai earthquake of 20 September 1498, during the Muromachi period. Since then, the Great Buddha has stood in the open air. In the mid-Edo period, the monks Yūten and Yōkoku sponsored a restoration of the daibutsu with funds provided by Nojima Shinzaemon, a merchant from Asakusa.

The earthquake of 1923 destroyed the base the statue sits upon, but the base was repaired in 1925. Repairs to the statue were also carried out in 1960–61, when the neck was strengthened and measures were taken to protect it from earthquakes. In early 2016, further research, restoration, and preservation work was performed on the statue.

=== Measurements ===
- Weight: 121 tonnes (267,000 pounds)
- Height: 13.35 metres (43.8 ft)
- Length of face: 2.35 metres (7 ft 9 in)
- Length of eye: 1.0 metre (3 ft 3 in)
- Length of mouth: 0.82 metres (2 ft 8 in)
- Length of ear: 1.90 metres (6 ft 3 in)
- Length from knee to knee: 9.10 metres (29.9 ft)
- Circumference of thumb: 0.85 metres (2 ft 9 in)
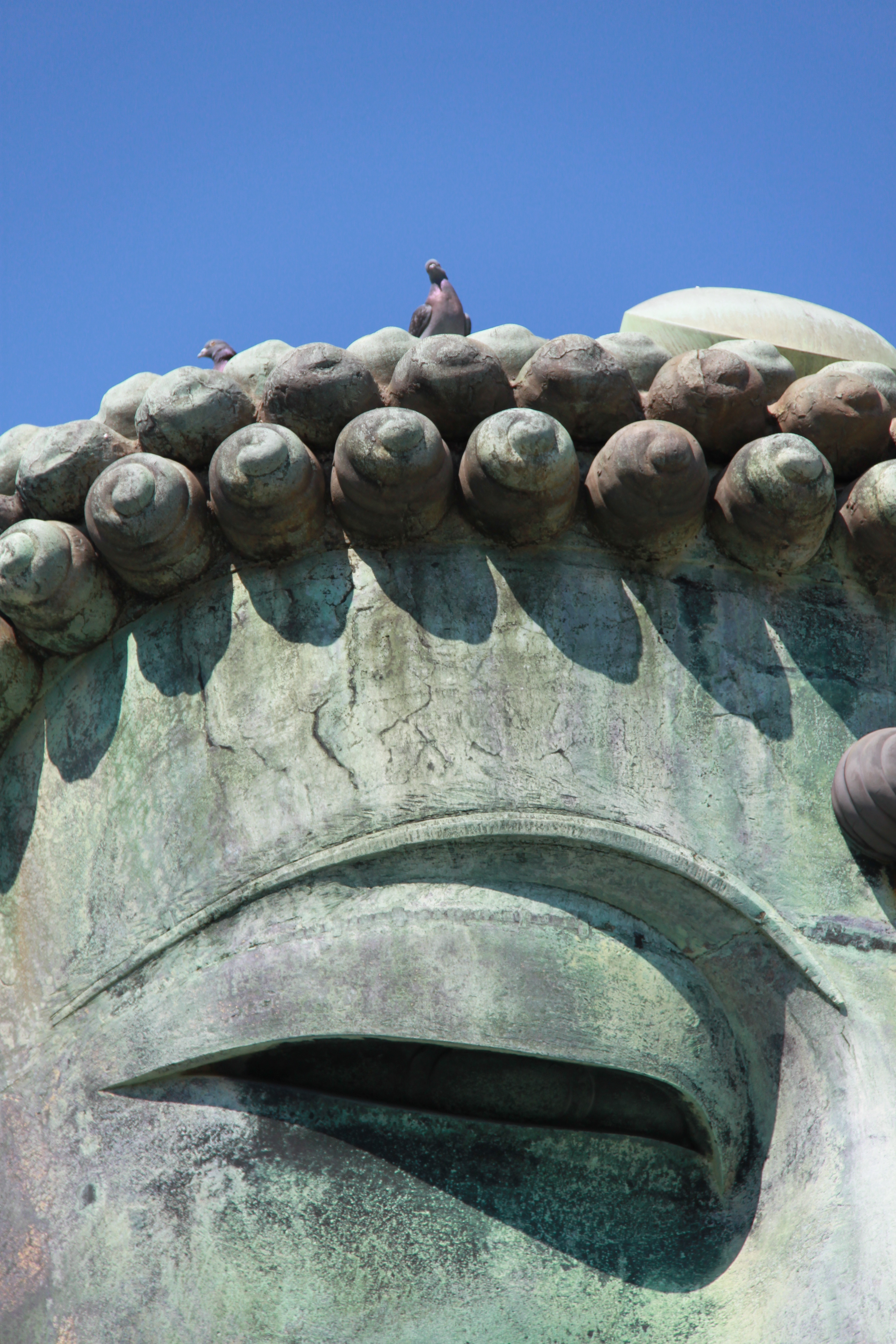
Close-up with a pigeon for scale

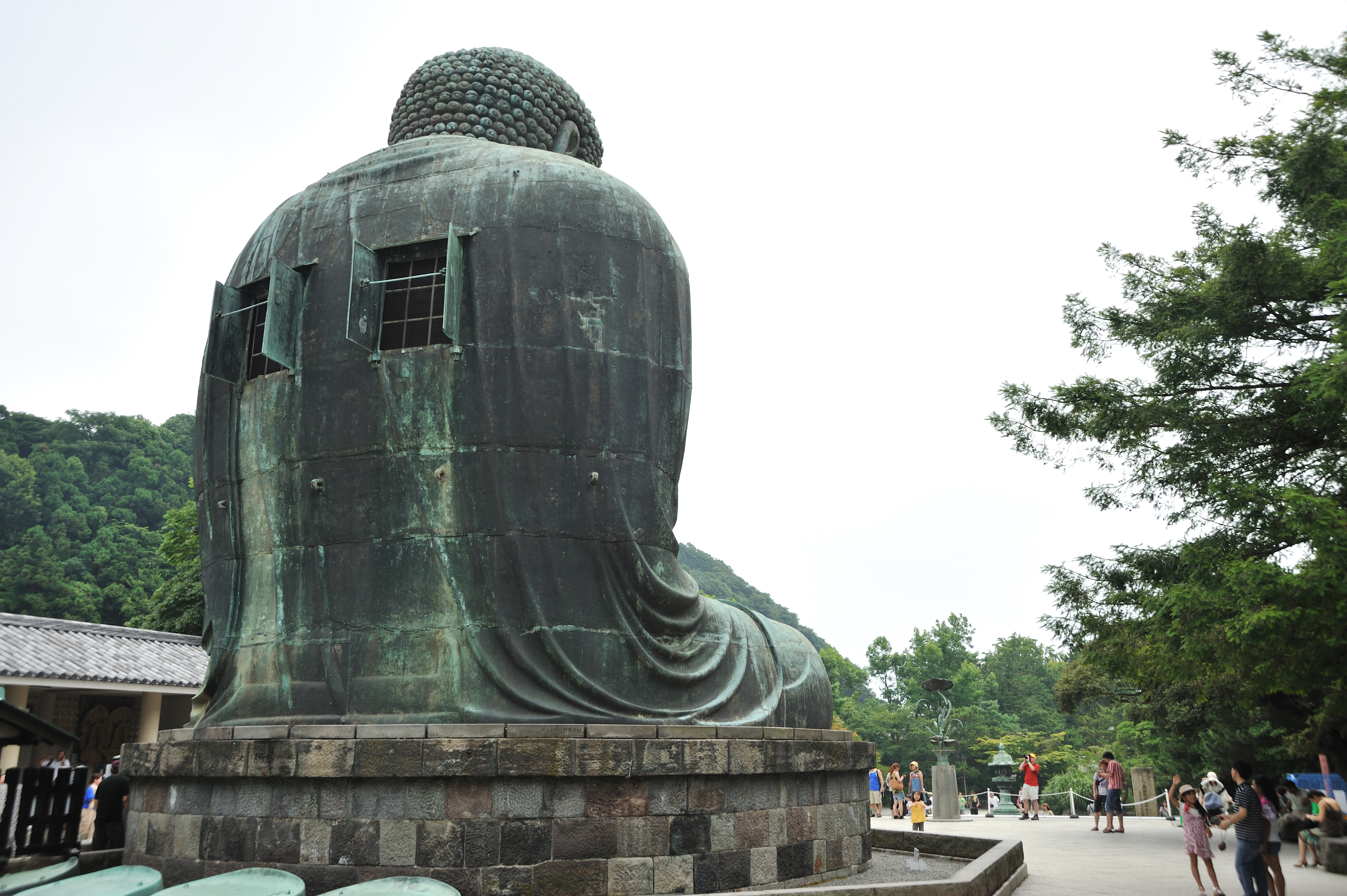
Rear side with open windows

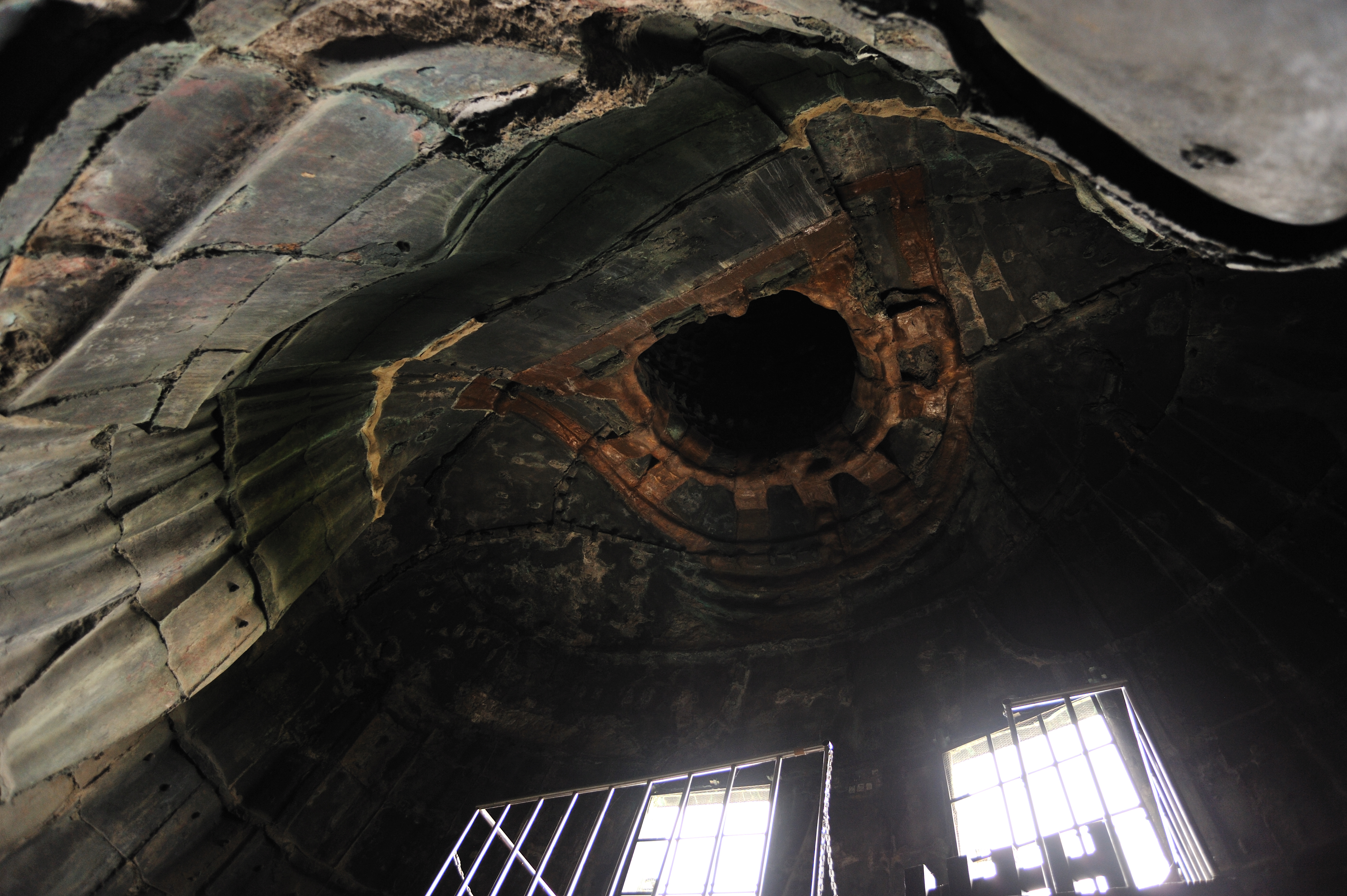
Interior

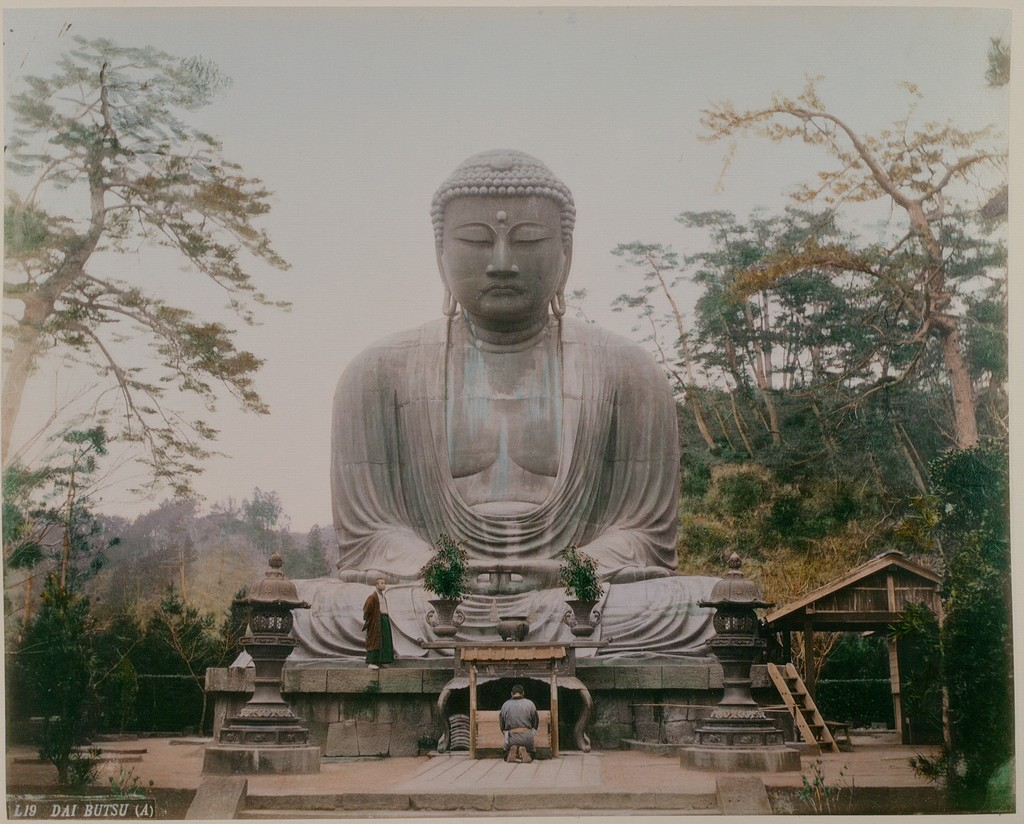
Photograph from the 1880s, by Adolfo Farsari

=== In arts and poetry ===
The statue is referred to as the "Buddha at Kamakura" in several verses that preface the initial chapters of the novel Kim by Rudyard Kipling (1901). The verses were taken from the poem of the same name the author wrote after visiting Kamakura in 1892. The poem appears in its entirety in Kipling's poetry collection The Five Nations of 1903.

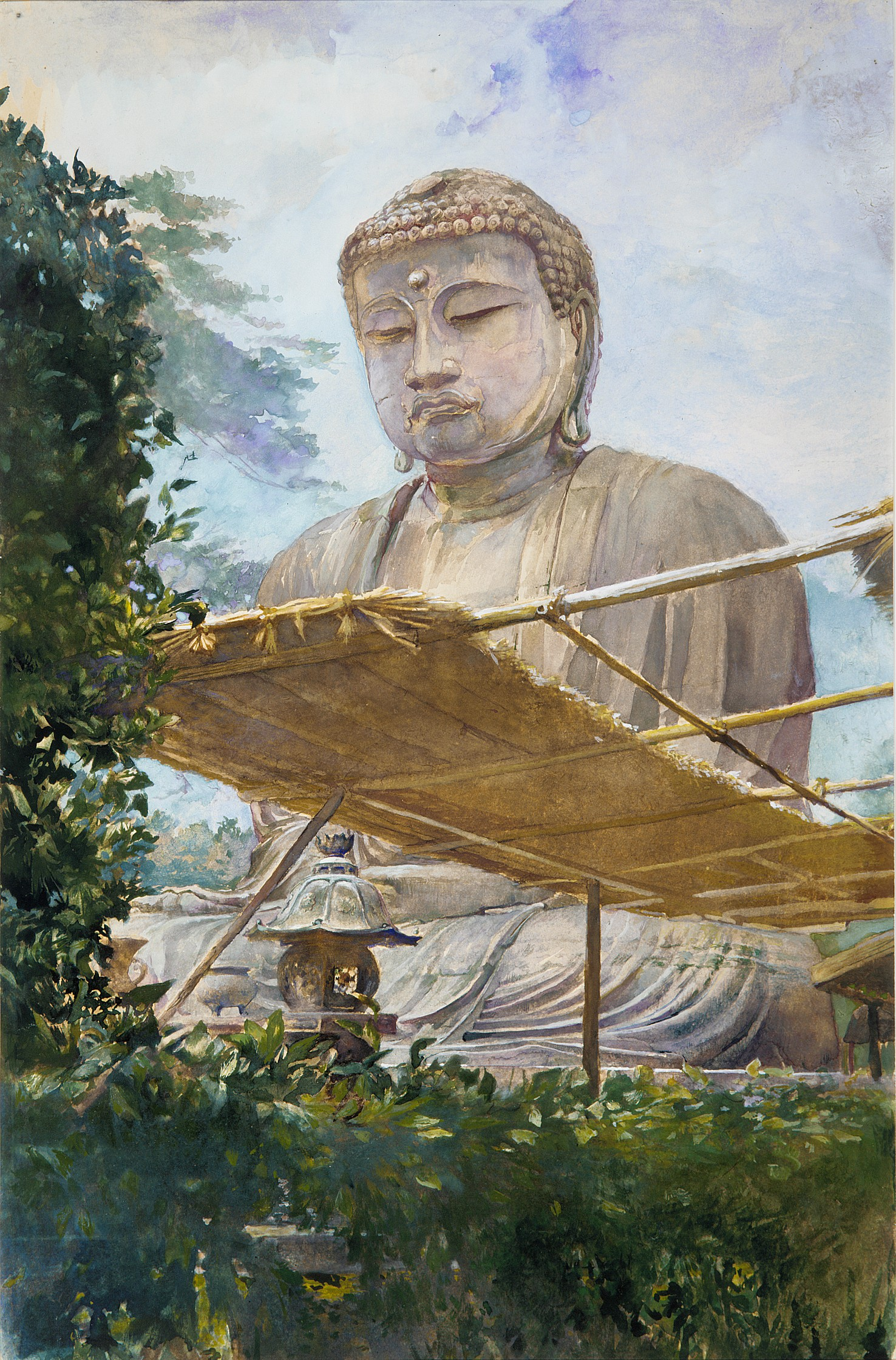
The Great Statue of Amida Buddha at Kamakura, Known as the Daibutsu, from the Priest's Garden. Watercolor painting by John La Farge, 1887

== Gallery ==
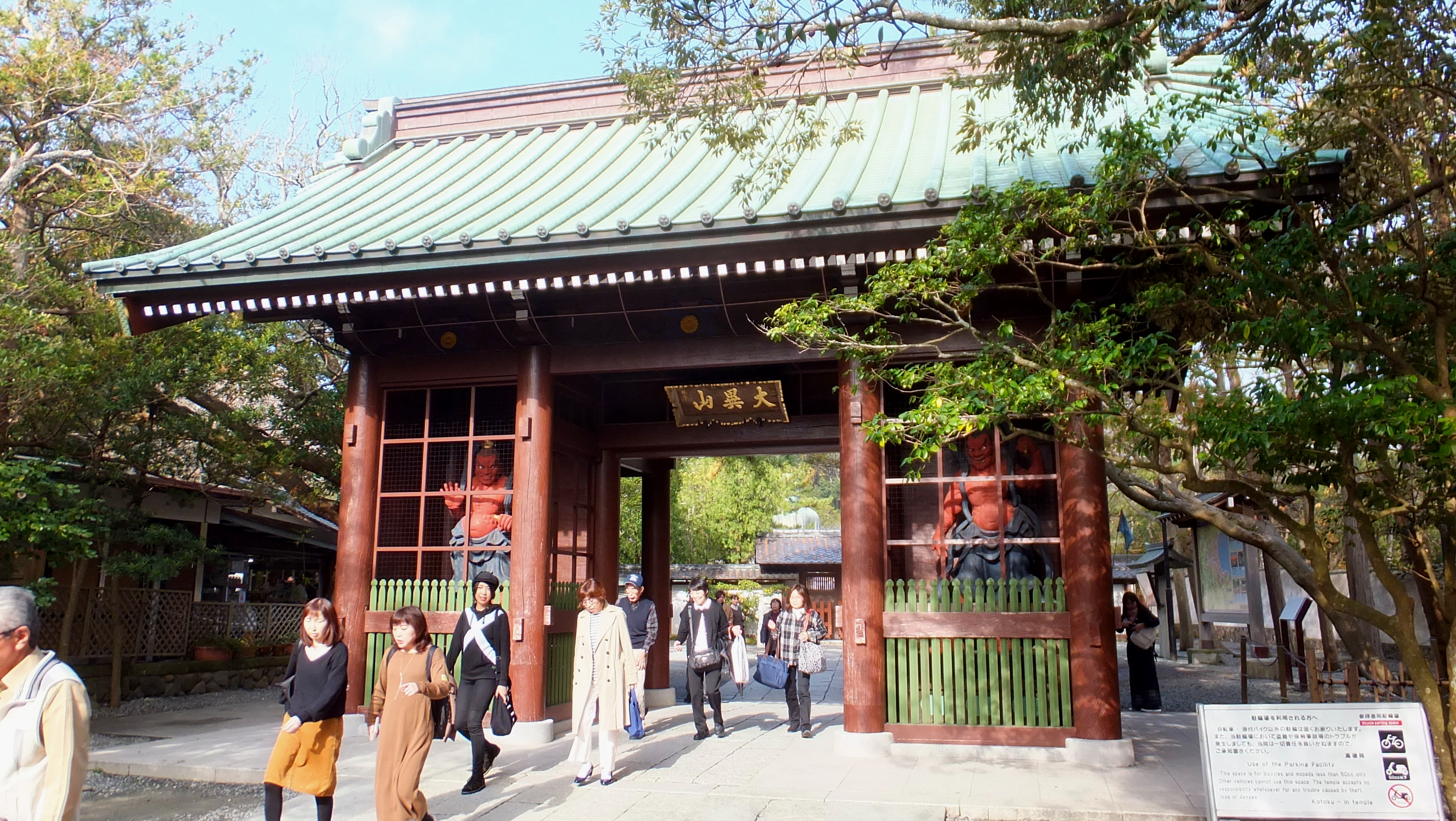
Entrance gate

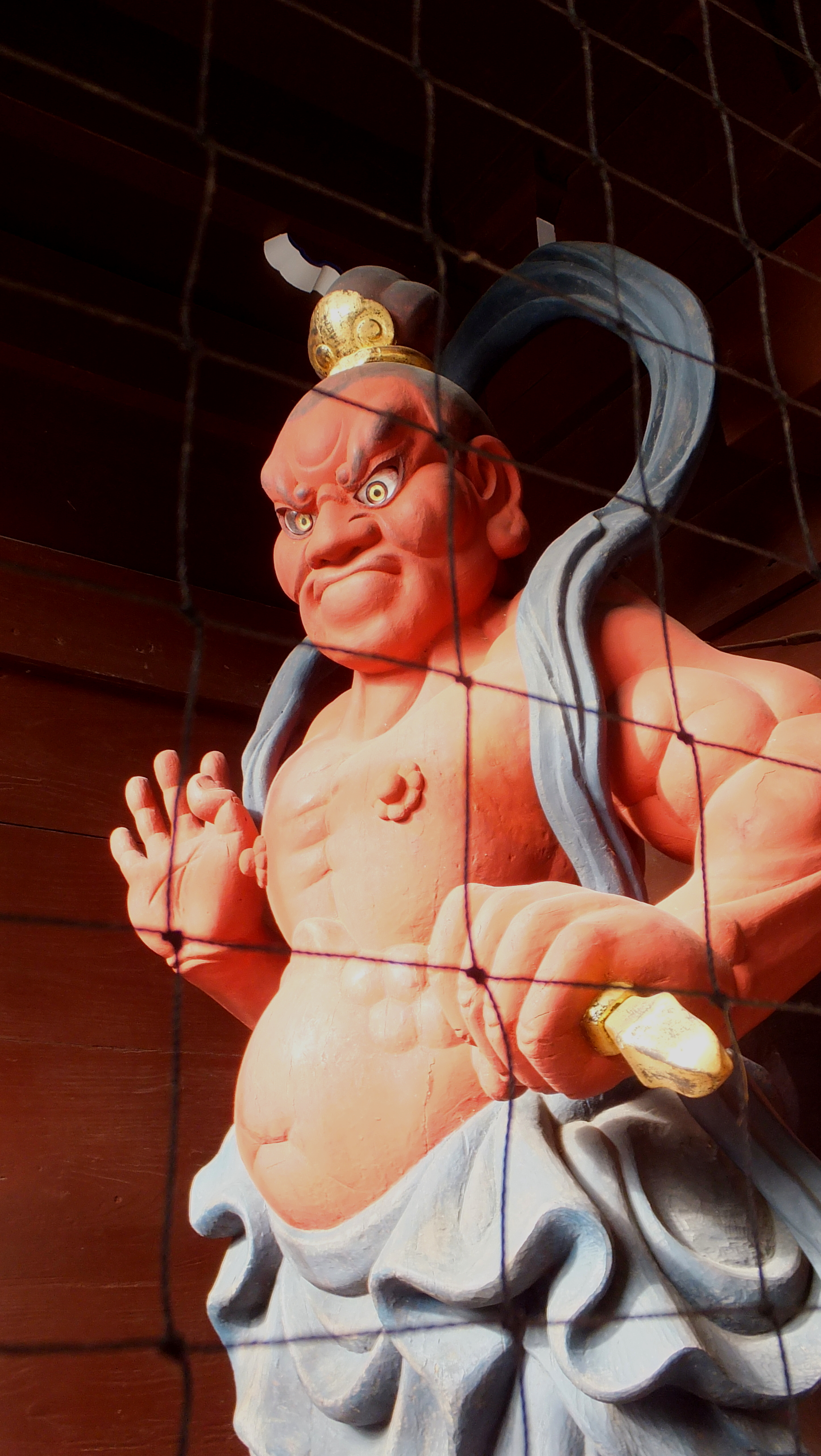
One of the Niō in the entrance gate

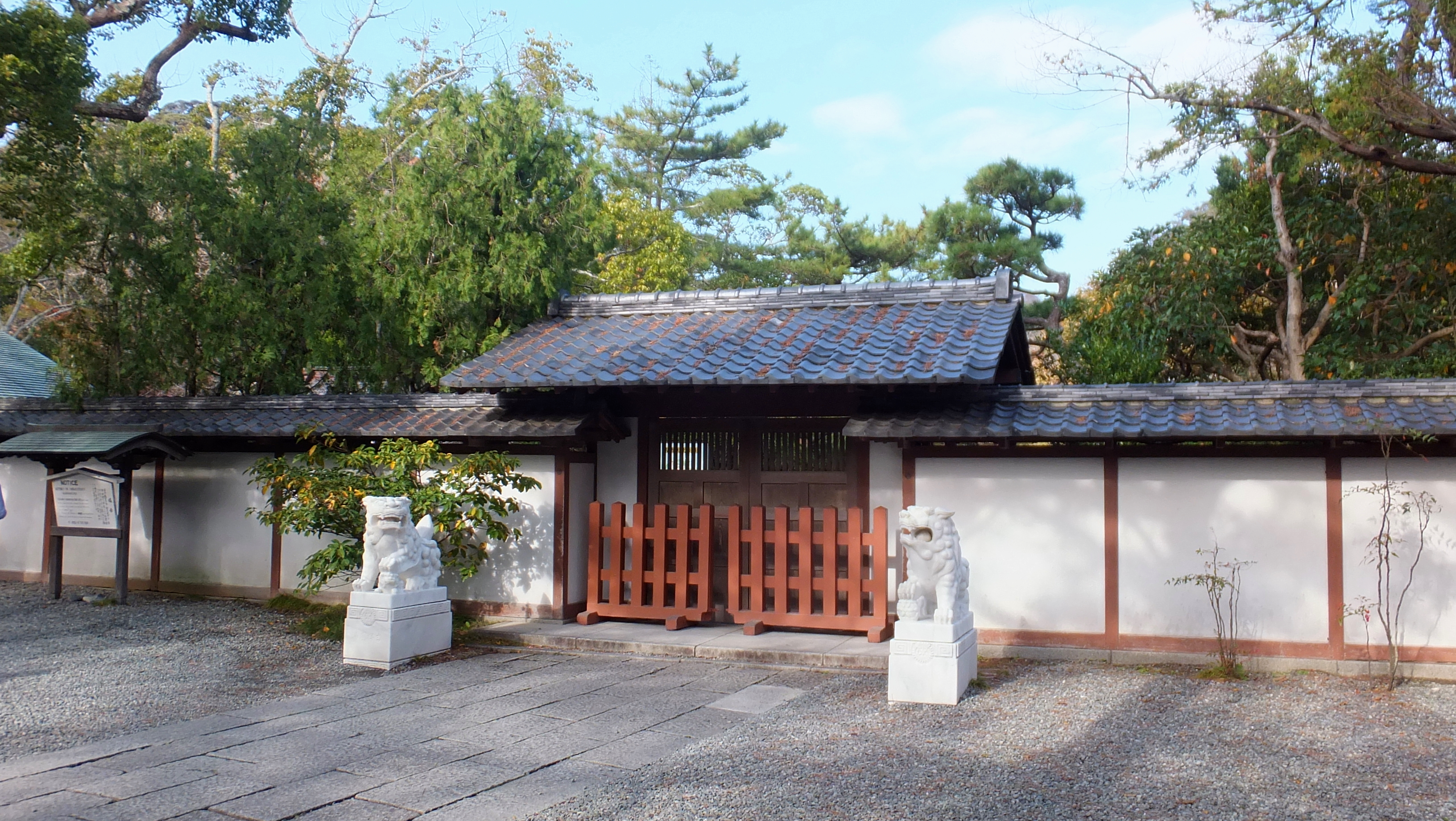

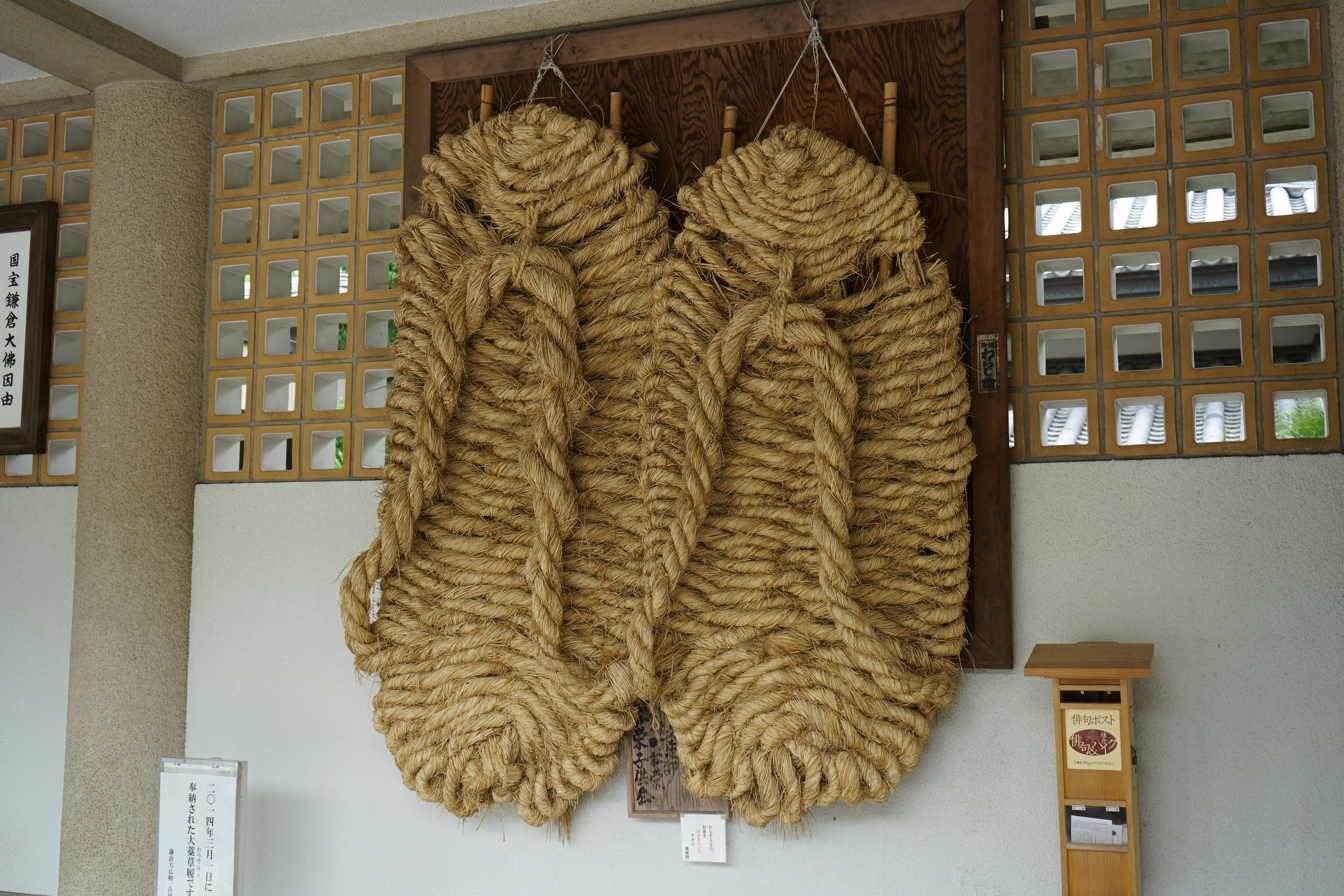
"Buddha's sandals" inside the temple

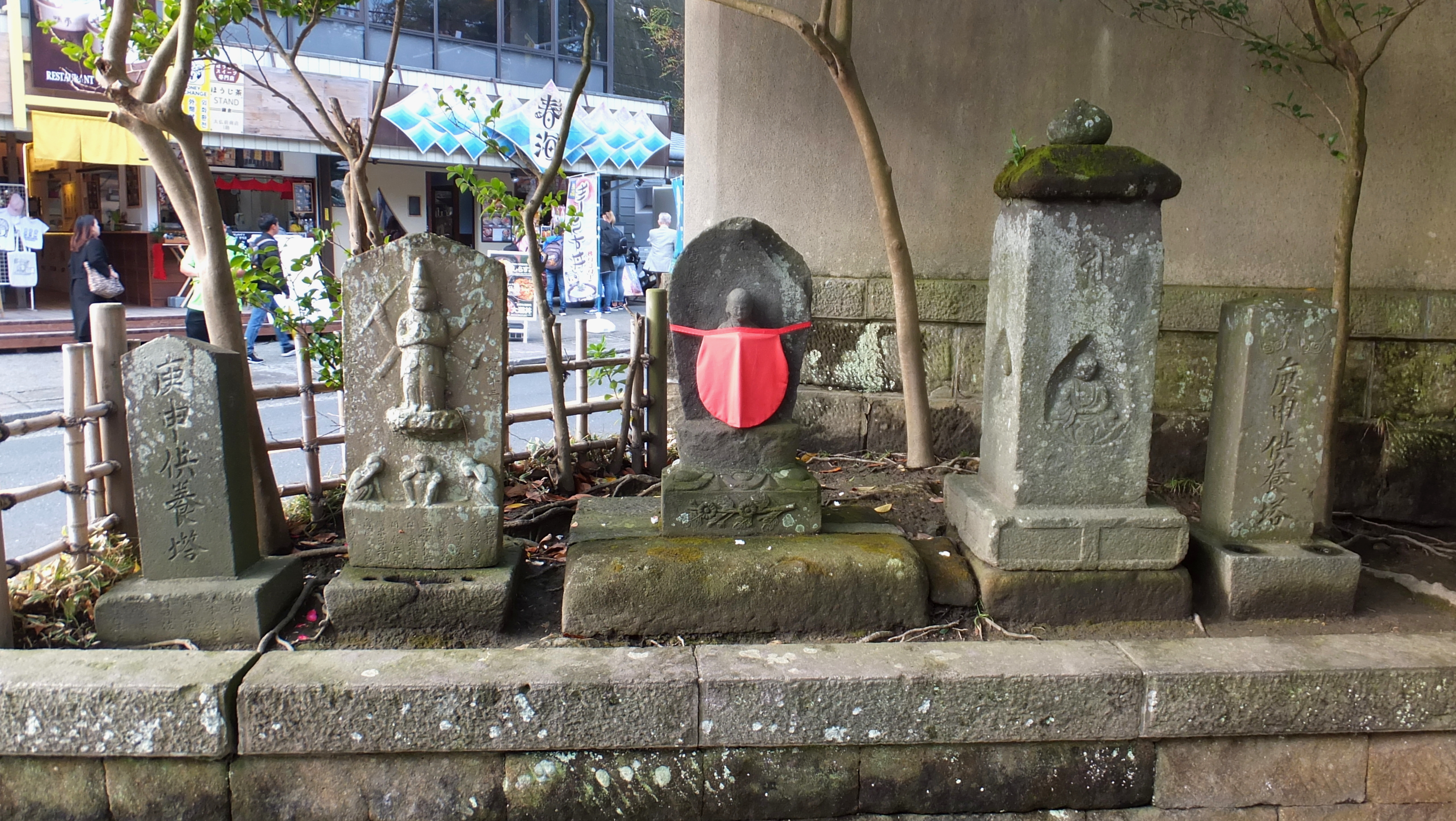
Statues outside the temple

Outside and inside views of the Great Buddha, 2023

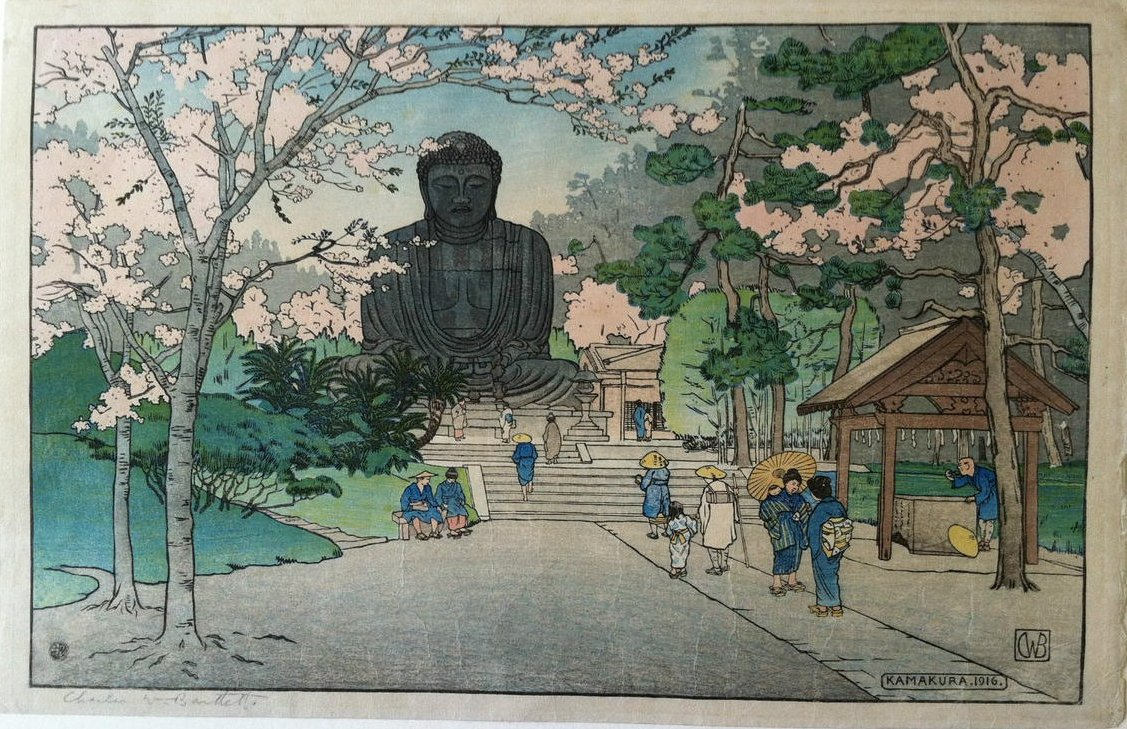
Kamakura. Woodblock print by Charles W. Bartlett, 1916

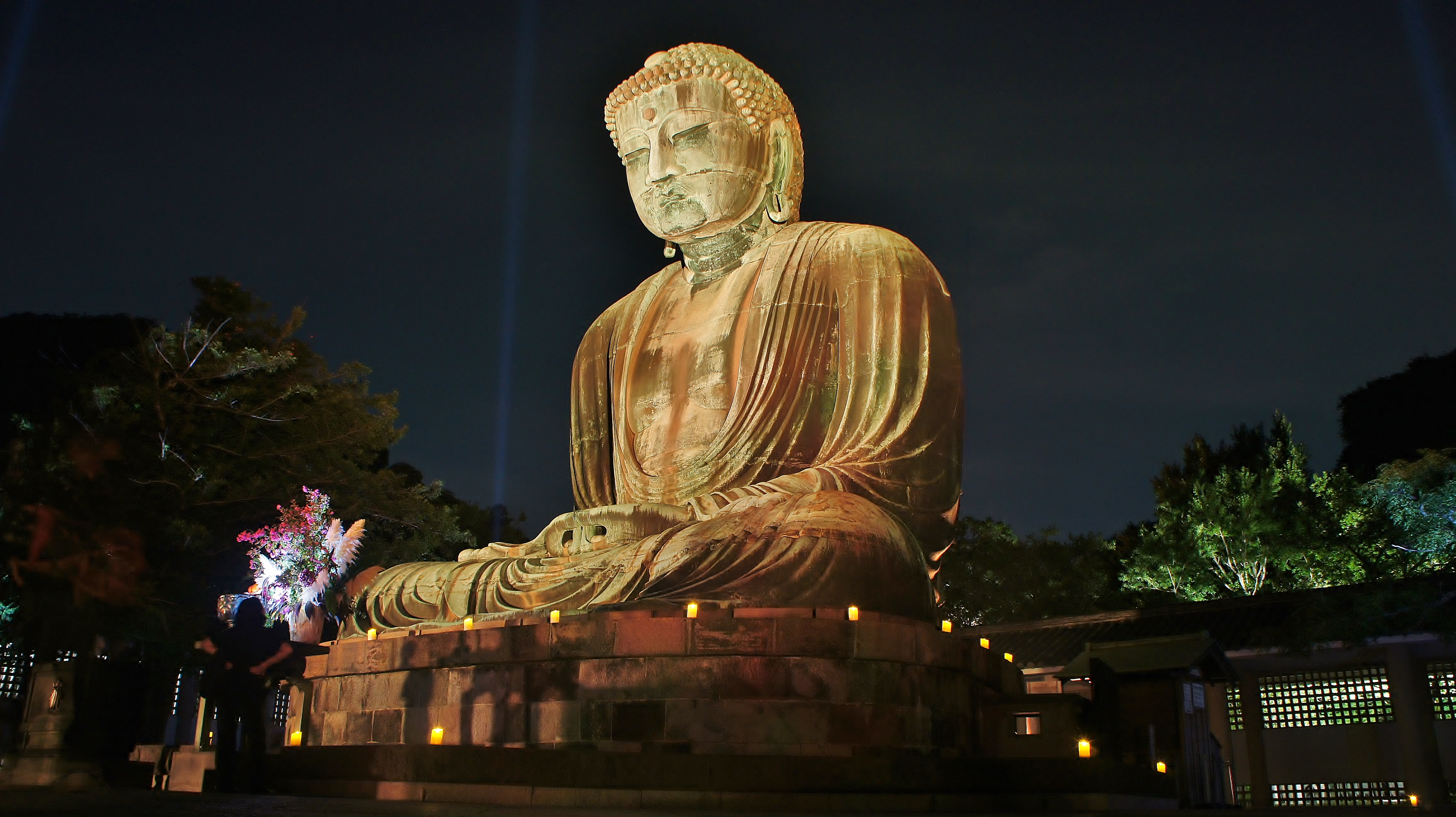
Night time illumination of the Great Buddha in Kamakura. Usually the lightup is in summer

== See also ==
- List of National Treasures of Japan (sculptures)
- Tian Tan Buddha – located in Hong Kong, world's tallest seated Buddha statue
- Tōdai-ji – temple in Nara, home to largest bronze Buddha statue in Japan
- Ushiku Daibutsu – Japan's tallest statue of a Buddha in Ushiku, Ibaraki Prefecture, Japan
