= Japanese Alps =

Series of mountain ranges in Japan

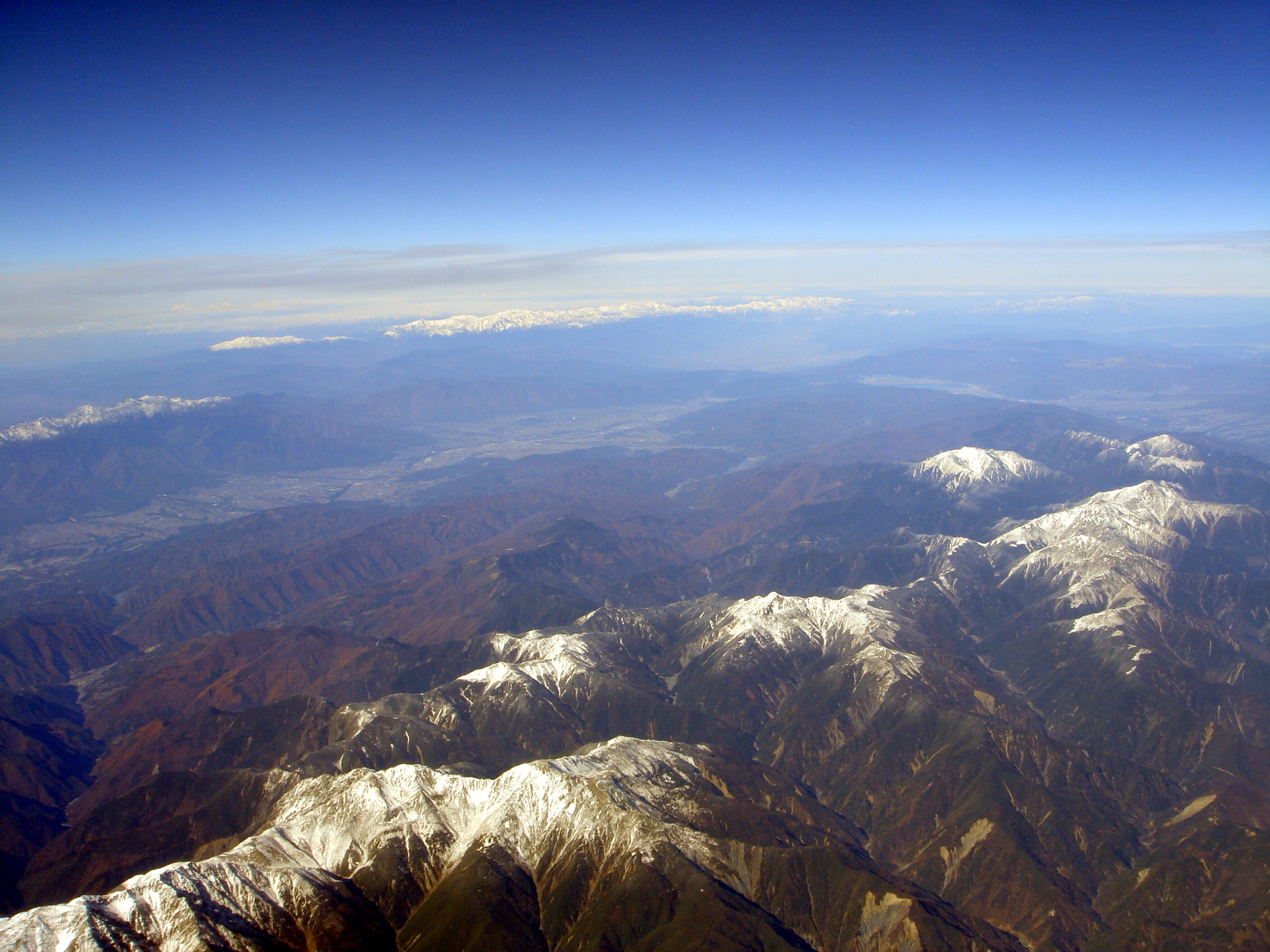
- From the front, South, Central, North Alps

Highest point
- Peak: Mount Kita
- Elevation: 3,193 m (10,476 ft)
- Coordinates: 35°40′27″N 138°14′12″E

Dimensions
- Length: 200 km (120 mi)
- Width: 40 km (25 mi)

Naming
- Native name: 日本アルプス (Japanese); Nihon Arupusu (Japanese)

Geography
- Location within Japan
- Location: Niigata Prefecture, Toyama Prefecture, Yamanashi Prefecture, Nagano Prefecture, Gifu Prefecture, Shizuoka Prefecture
- Country: Japan

The Japanese Alps (Japanese: 日本アルプス, Hepburn: Nihon Arupusu) is a series of mountain ranges in Japan which bisect the main island of Honshu. The peaks that tower over central Honshu have long been the object of veneration and pilgrimage. These mountains had long been exploited by local people for raw materials, including timber, fuel, fertilizer, fodder, meat, minerals, and medicines. Many visitors have come to the mountains for pilgrimage, especially to the Buddhist temples located within them and the sacred peak of Mount Tate.

The name was coined by English archaeologist William Gowland, and later popularized by Reverend Walter Weston (1861–1940), an English missionary for whom a memorial plaque is located at Kamikōchi, a tourist destination known for its alpine climate. When Gowland coined the phrase, he was only referring to the Hida Mountains, but it now also applies to the Kiso Mountains and Akaishi Mountains.

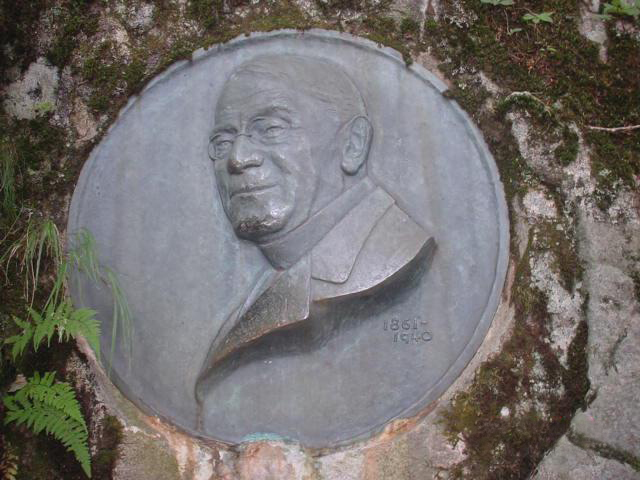
Memorial plaque at Kamikōchi to Reverend Walter Weston, called the "Father of the Japanese Alps"

== History ==
The Japanese Alps has a long history before William Gowland established this name. The Japanese Alps have been used as a place of ascetic practice for Buddhists monks and Shugenja since ancient times. From the 1600s to the 1800s, samurai officers of the Kaga domain travelled deep into the Hida Mountains with local hunters and farmers as guides to preserve the timber of the mountains and continued to create maps recording ridges, valleys and vegetation. This survey is called Okuyama-mawari (奥山廻り).

Even now, it is very difficult to cross the steep Hida mountains, one of the world's heaviest snowfall areas, in winter. Therefore, it is considered a historical event in Japan that in the winter of 1584, daimyō Sassa Narimasa's forces crossed over the mountain range over Zara Pass and Harinoki Pass. This event is called "Sarasara-goe" (さらさら越え) derived from Sassa and Zara Pass.

However, these Hida Mountains surveys did not seem to have been inherited by modern Japanese mountaineers who trekked through the mountains as a sport. As Kojima Usui later recalled, “in those days,... no one knew even the names of the mountains, much less their locations or elevations. To go mountaineering was literally to strike out into the unknown country.”

The first modern geological survey sheets were issued in 1890. The report mentioned major peaks, but the topography was mostly guesswork. From 1891, foreign travelers were able to find useful information in Basil Hall Chamberlain and W.B. Mason's Handbook for Travellers in Japan. However, for decades, the Japanese were climbing these mountains without a comparable guidebook. Japanese people did physical exploration over a decade in the 1890s. They divided the mountains into (north, central, and south) depending on how they were conventionally grouped. William Gowland, an English geologist, first thought of this swath of terrain as forming a single coherent landscape, comparable to the European Alps. Gowland's view was further developed by another Englishman and Christian missionary, Walter Weston, who was able “to canonize Gowland's geographical conception, deploying it as a de facto proper noun”.

Gowland explored several parts of the ranges in the 1860s, being the first documented foreigner to climb two peaks in the Alps, Mount Yari and Mount Norikura. Gowland was an archaeologist, and he explored these ranges for archaeological reasons. While Gowland was the first foreigner to explore the ranges, Reverend Walter Weston, a Christian missionary, was the first foreigner to document his experiences.

About twenty years after Gowland's explorations, Weston explored the ranges himself with Gowland's notes on his explorations. Weston was led up many mountains by Kamijō kamonji, a mountain guide living in Kamikōchi. Weston explored the same ranges that Gowland previously traversed, and ascended the Mount Shirouma, Mount Jōnen, Mount Kasa, Mount Hotaka, and other minor mountains.

Weston first documented the two main mountain systems distinguishable by geological structure. The first of these he called the "China system" due to its connection with southeast China from just south of the Japanese archipelago. The second was called the "Karafuto system", due to the fact that it enters Japan from Karafuto to the north and runs southwest. These two were considered to be the first western explorers of the range, and as a result Weston, with the help of Gowland, popularized and documented different parts of the ranges in an incredibly in-depth manner for others to expand on.

In 1907, Yoshitaro Shibasaki and others succeeded in climbing Mount Tsurugi, which is said to be the last unexplored peak in Japan and the most difficult to climb. On this occasion, they found the ornaments of a metal shugenja cane and a sword on the top of the mountain. A scientific investigation later confirmed that the ornaments of the cane and the sword were from the late Nara period to the early Heian period. It turned out that Mount Tsurugi had already been climbed by shugenja more than 1,000 years ago.

From the 1960s to the 1970s, the transportation infrastructure of the Japanese Alps was improved, and access to some popular mountain areas became dramatically easier, increasing not only climbers but also tourists. The Komagatake Ropeway opened in 1967, the Shinhotaka Ropeway opened in 1970, and the Tateyama Kurobe Alpine Route fully opened in 1971.

== Ranges ==
Today, the Japanese Alps encompass the Hida Mountains (飛騨山脈), the Kiso Mountains (木曽山脈) and the Akaishi Mountains (赤石山脈). These towering ranges include several peaks exceeding 3,000 m (9,843 ft) in height, the tallest after Mount Fuji. The highest are Mount Hotaka at 3,190 m (10,466 ft) in north area and Mount Kita at 3,193 m (10,476 ft) in south area. Since Mount Ontake is far from the Hida Mountains, it is generally not included in the Hida Mountains, but it is often mentioned together with the Japanese Alps in mountain guidebooks. Mount Ontake is well known as an active volcano, having erupted most recently in 2014.

=== Northern Alps ===
The Northern Alps, also known as the Hida Mountains, stretch through Nagano, Toyama and Gifu prefectures. A small portion of the mountains also reach into Niigata Prefecture. It includes the mountains Mount Norikura, Mount Yake, Mount Kasa, Mount Hotaka, Mount Yari, Mount Jōnen, Mount Washiba, Mount Suisho, Mount Yakushi, Mount Kurobegorō, Mount Tate, Mount Tsurugi, Kashima Yarigatake (鹿島槍ヶ岳), Goryū dake (五竜岳), Mount Shirouma, etc.

=== Central Alps ===
The Central Alps, also known as the Kiso Mountains, are located in the Nagano prefecture. It includes the mountains Mount Ena, Anpaiji mountain (安平路山), Mount Kusumoyama (越百山), Mount Minamikoma, Mount Utsugi, Mount Hōken, Mount Kisokoma, Kyogatake (経ヶ岳), etc.

=== Southern Alps ===
The Southern Alps, also known as the Akaishi Mountains, span Nagano, Yamanashi, and Shizuoka prefectures. It includes the mountains Mount Tekari, Mount Hijiri, Mount Akaishi, Mount Arakawa, Mount Shiomi, Mount Nōtori, Mount Aino, Mount Kita, Mount Hōō, Mount Kaikoma, Mount Senjō, Mount Nokogiri (Akaishi), etc.

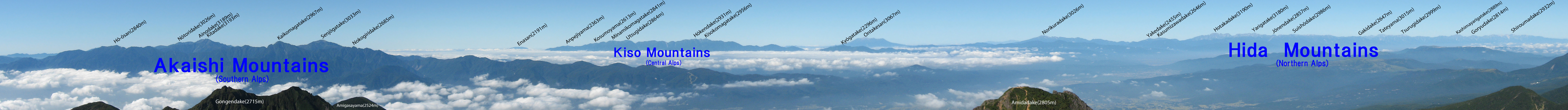
A panorama of the mountains of the Japanese Alps. Photo is taken from Yatsugatake, September 2007

== Glaciers ==
Geographers previously believed that no active glaciers existed in Japan. The Japanese Society of Snow and Ice found this to be false in May 2012. By studying surface flow velocity and snow patches in Mount Tsurugi, they found that certain perennial snow patches have large masses of ice, upwards of 30 meters in thickness. This causes these snow patches to be classified as active glaciers, and as of 2019 there are seven active glaciers in the Japanese Alps, and all of Japan.

== See also ==
- Tourism in Japan
