= Mount Sannosawa =

Mountain in Nagano Prefecture, Japan

- 三ノ沢岳
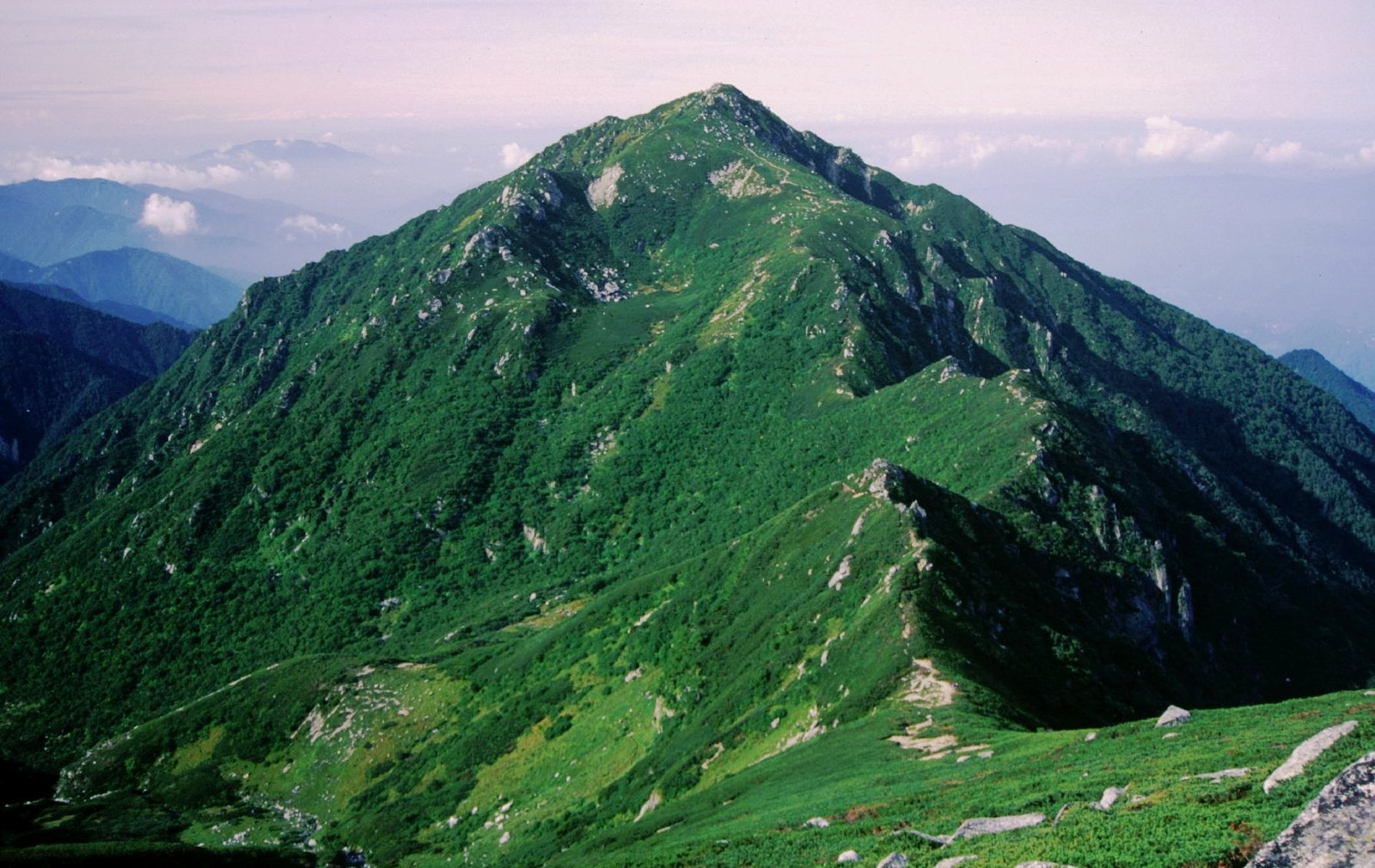
- Mount Sannosawa and Sannosawa cirque on east side seen from the direction of Mount Hōken

Highest point
- Elevation: 2,846 m (9,337 ft)
- Coordinates: 35°46′00″N 137°47′38″E

Geography
- Location: Kiso District, Japan
- Parent range: Kiso Mountains

Climbing
- Easiest route: Komagatake Ropeway

Mount Sannosawa (三ノ沢岳, Sannosawa-dake) is amongst the Kiso Mountains, located in the Kiso District, Nagano Prefecture, in the Chūbu region of Japan. It is 2,846 m (9,337 ft) tall. It is composed of Granite, and has a 120 m (394 ft) long 30 m (98 ft) wide cirque covered in dense vegetation, mainly pine trees. There is the "Sannosawa cirque". Glacial expansion has created a gully, just underneath the cirque. A lot of Alpine plant grow naturally. Name River and Ina River (Tributary of Kiso River) that become the sources flow to the Ise Bay of Pacific Ocean. There is the tributary called "Sannosawa" around Mount Sannosawa. Komagatake Ropeway is used to climb.

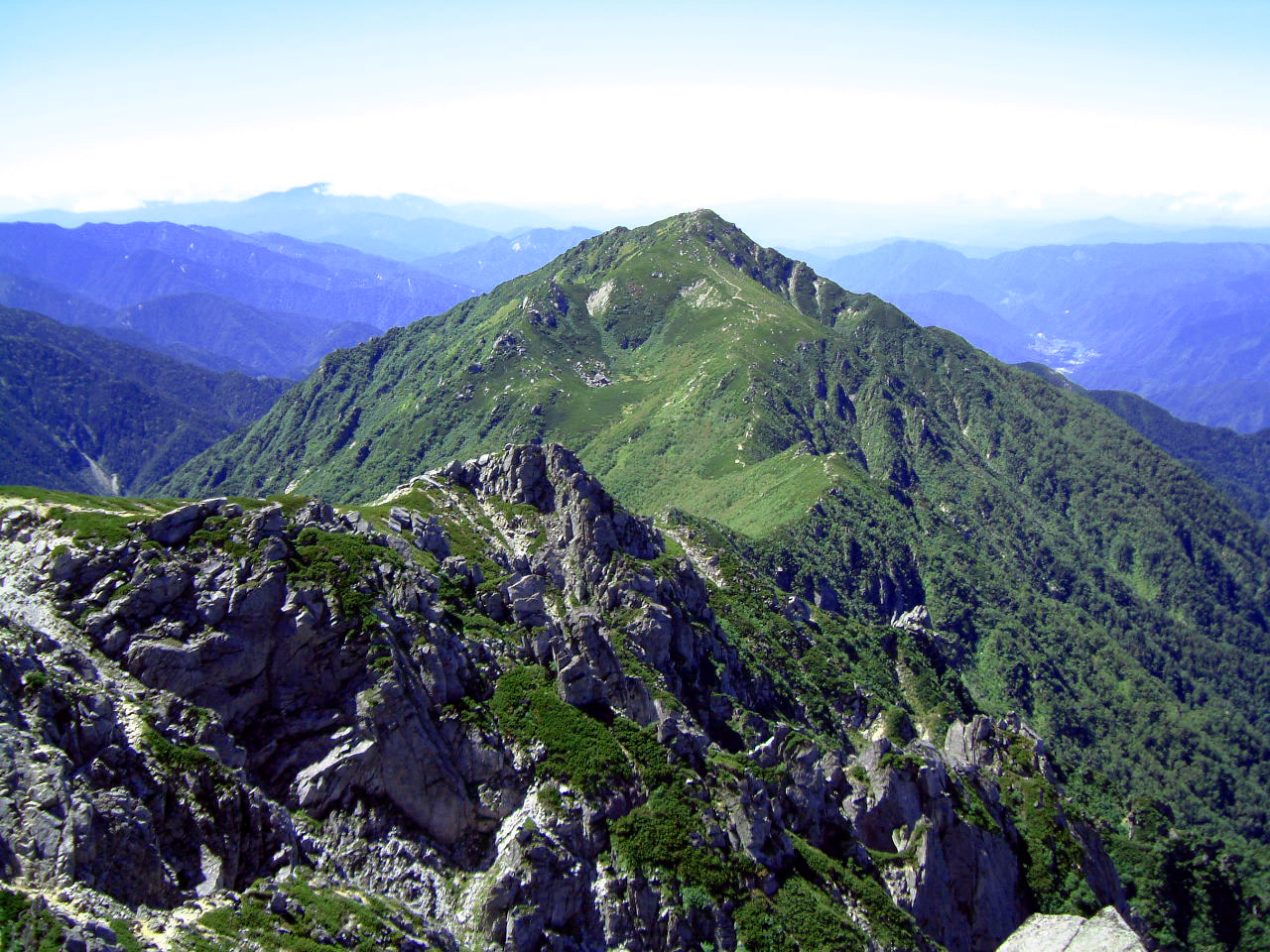
Mount Sannosawa
seen from Mount Hōken

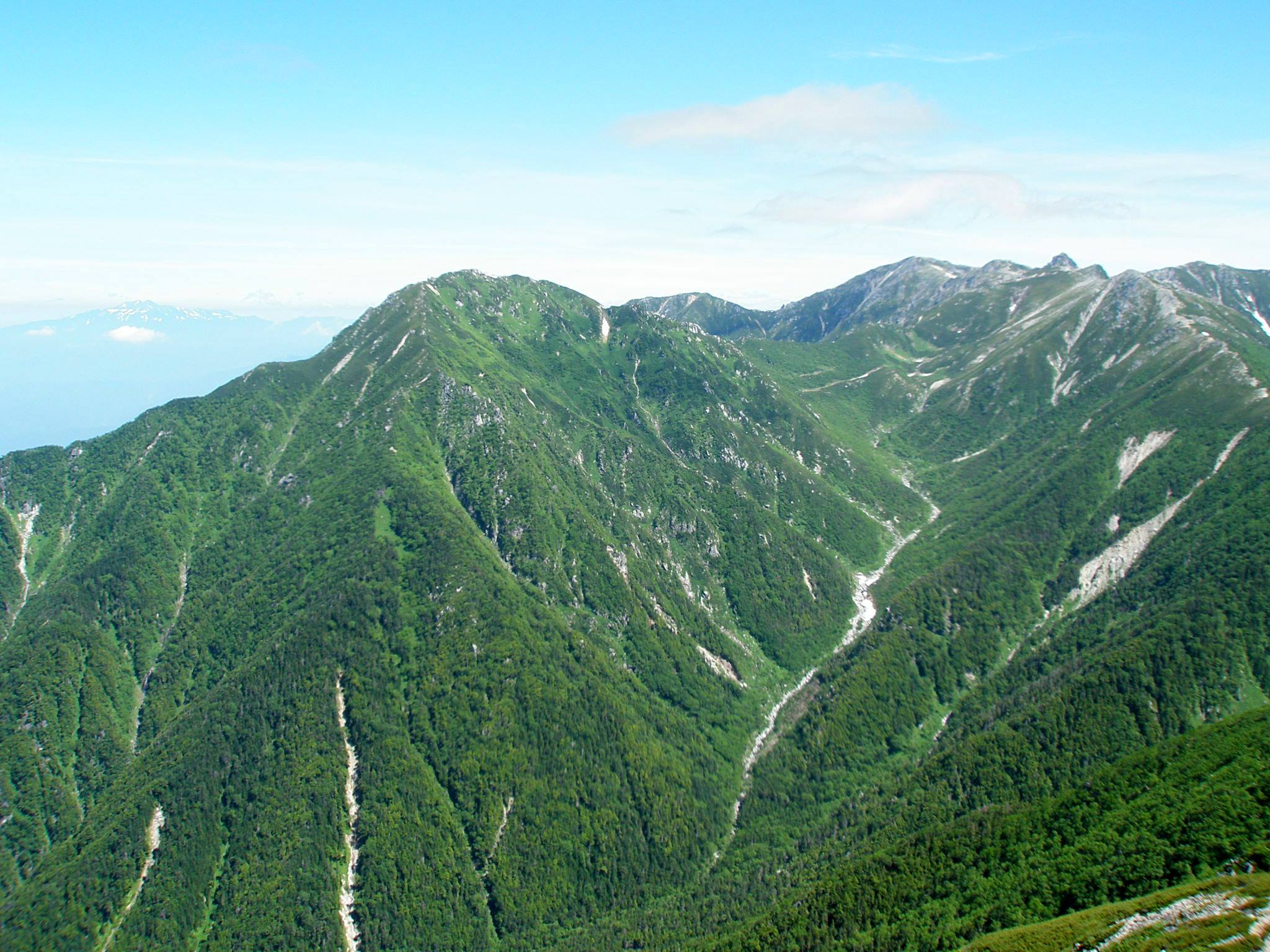
Mount Sannosawa
seen from Mount Hinokio

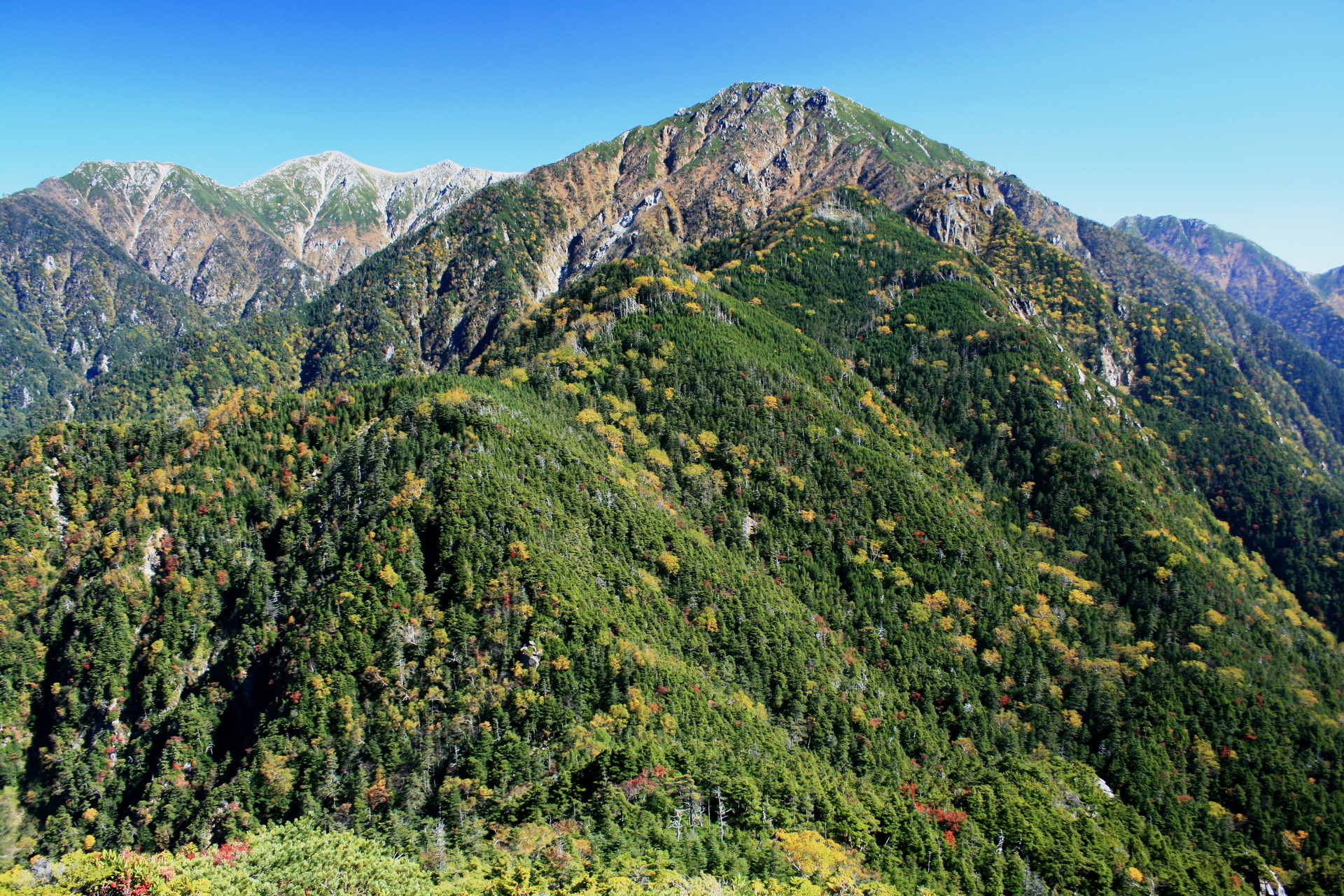
Mount Sannosawa
seen from southwest

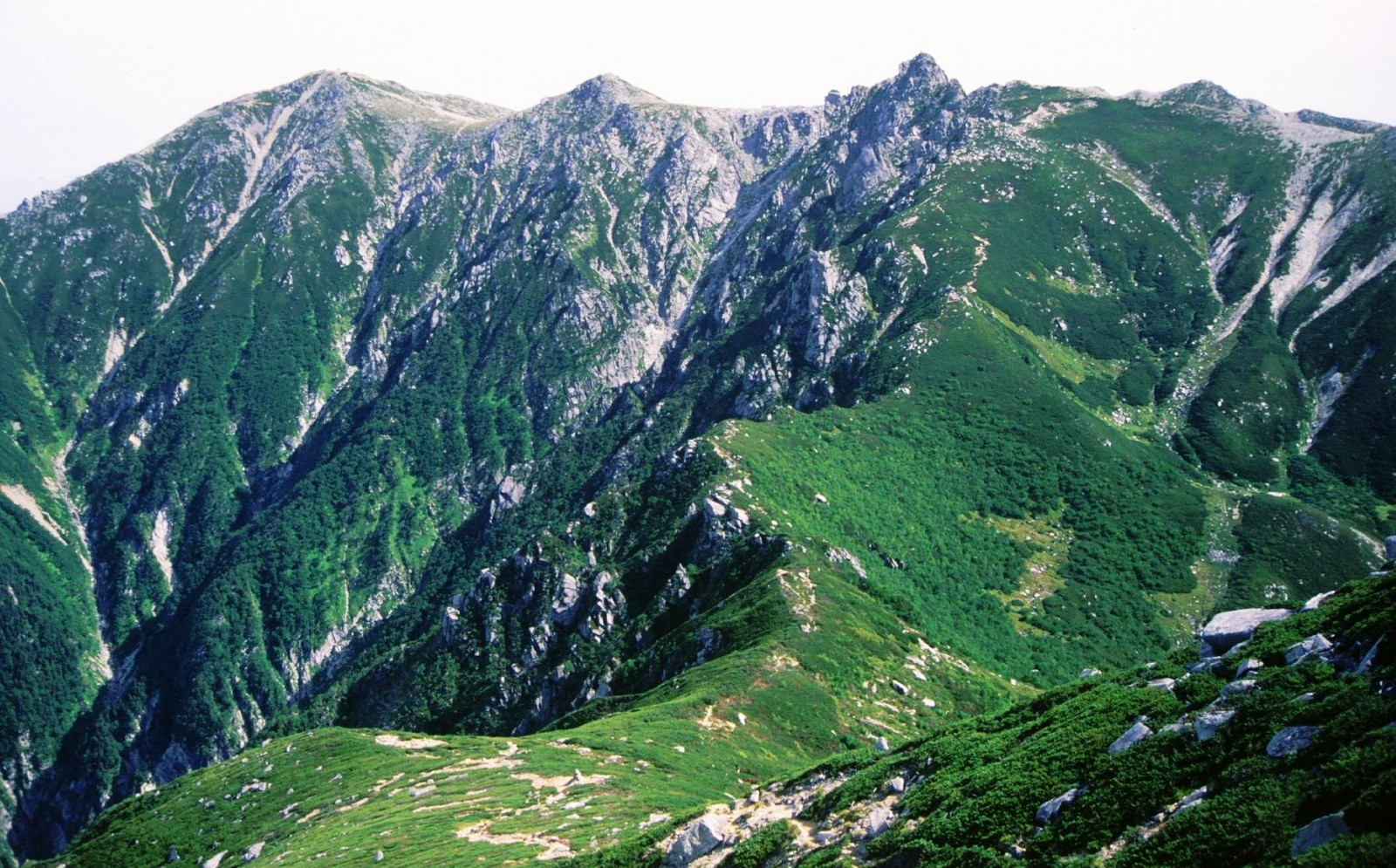
Mount Kisokoma and Mount Hōken
seen from Mount Sannosawa

== See also ==
- Kiso Mountains
- List of mountains in Japan
