= William Gowland =

English mining engineer

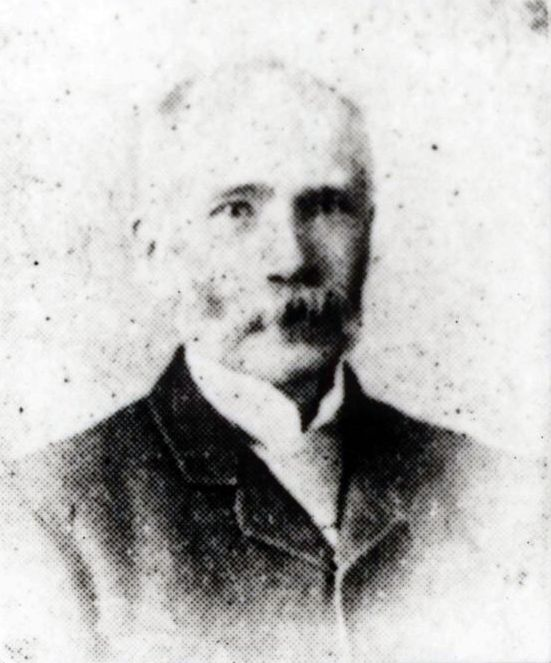
- William Gowland
- Born: 16 December 1842; Sunderland, County Durham, England
- Died: 9 June 1922 (aged 79); London, England
- Occupations: metallurgist, amateur archaeologist, foreign advisor to Japan
- Known for: Foreign advisor to Meiji Japan

William Gowland FRAI (16 December 1842 – 9 June 1922) was an English mining engineer who carried out archaeological work at Stonehenge and in Japan. He has been called the "Father of Japanese Archaeology".

== Biography ==
Gowland was born in Sunderland, County Durham, in northern England. He attended the Royal College of Chemistry and Royal School of Mines at South Kensington, specialising in metallurgy, and worked as a chemist and as a metallurgist at the Broughton Copper Company from 1870 to 1872. However, in 1872, at the age of 30, he was recruited by the Meiji government of the Empire of Japan as a foreign engineering advisor at the Osaka Zōheikyoku, the forerunner of the Japan Mint.

== In Japan (1872–88) ==
Gowland began work in Osaka on 8 October 1872 on the three-year contract that was typical of many of the foreigners employed to aid the modernisation of Japan. His contract was repeatedly extended, and he stayed for 16 years, during which time he introduced techniques for the scientific analysis of metals, the production of bronze and copper alloys for coinage, and modern technologies such as the reverberatory furnace for improving the efficiency of refining copper ores. His expertise extended to areas outside the Japan Mint, and he also served as a consultant to the Imperial Japanese Army, helping to establish the Osaka Arsenal for production of artillery. In 1883, he was awarded the Order of the Rising Sun (4th class) by the Japanese government.

During his spare time in Japan, Gowland enjoyed mountaineering, making the first recorded ascent on several peaks of the Japanese Alps, a name which Gowland coined and which was published in 1888 by Basil Hall Chamberlain in his Japan Guide. The name was later popularised by English missionary Walter Weston. Gowland also claimed to have been the first foreigner to have climbed Yarigatake in 1874.

However, Gowland is best known in Japan as an amateur archaeologist, conducting the first truly accurate scientific surveys of numerous Kofun period (3rd–7th centuries AD) burial mounds (kofun), which included numerous imperial mausolea. He excavated burial mounds in Saga, Fukuoka and Miyazaki Prefectures on Kyūshū, in Okayama Prefecture, and in Fukushima Prefecture north of Tokyo, in addition to numerous sites in the Kinki region.

Upon Gowland's departure from Japan in 1888, he was awarded the Order of the Rising Sun, 4th class, and a 3,000-yen bonus from then-Finance Minister Matsukata Masayoshi. Once back in England, he published numerous works about his researches in Japan and was elected a Fellow of the Royal Society. He donated many of the artefacts that he brought back to England to the British Museum, as well as a collection of souvenirs from Buddhist temples. Gowland was also an avid collector of Nihonga-style Japanese paintings.

== In England ==
On 31 December 1900, Stone 22 of the Sarsen Circle fell over during a storm, taking with it a lintel. Following public pressure and a letter to The Times by William Flinders Petrie, the owner Edmund Antrobus agreed to allow remedial engineering under archaeological supervision. To manage the job, Antrobus appointed Gowland, who, despite having no formal archaeological training, produced some of the finest, most detailed excavation records ever made at the monument. The only area that he opened was around the precariously leaning Stone 56 (the western stone of the Great Trilithon), an area measuring approximately 17 by 13 ft (5.2 by 4.0 m). The task proved more difficult since only small areas could be dug at a time for the pouring and the setting of concrete.

Despite these difficulties, he established that antler picks had been used to dig the stone holes and that the stones had been shaped on site. His work both identified the 'Stonehenge layer', a thin stratum of bluestone chips that sealed many of the non-megalithic features at the site, and proved that these chips predated the standing stones.

== Final years ==
Gowland died in London on 9 June 1922 at the age of 79. He was buried at St. Marylebone Cemetery in East Finchley.

== Selected works ==
- The Dolmens and other Antiquities of Korea, 1895
- The Art of Casting Bronze in Japan, 1896
- The Dolmens and Burial Mounds in Japan, 1897
- The Dolmens of Japan and their Builders, 1900
- The Burial Mounds and Dolmens of the Early Emperors of Japan, 1907
- The Art of Working Metals in Japan, 1910
- Metals in Antiquity, 1912
- The Metallurgy of Non-ferrous Metals, 1914
- Metal and Metal-Working in Old Japan, 1915
- Silver in Roman and Earlier Times, 1920

== See also ==
- Anglo-Japanese relations
