= Senjōjiki Cirque =

Coordinates: 35°46′47.35″N 137°48′43.61″E

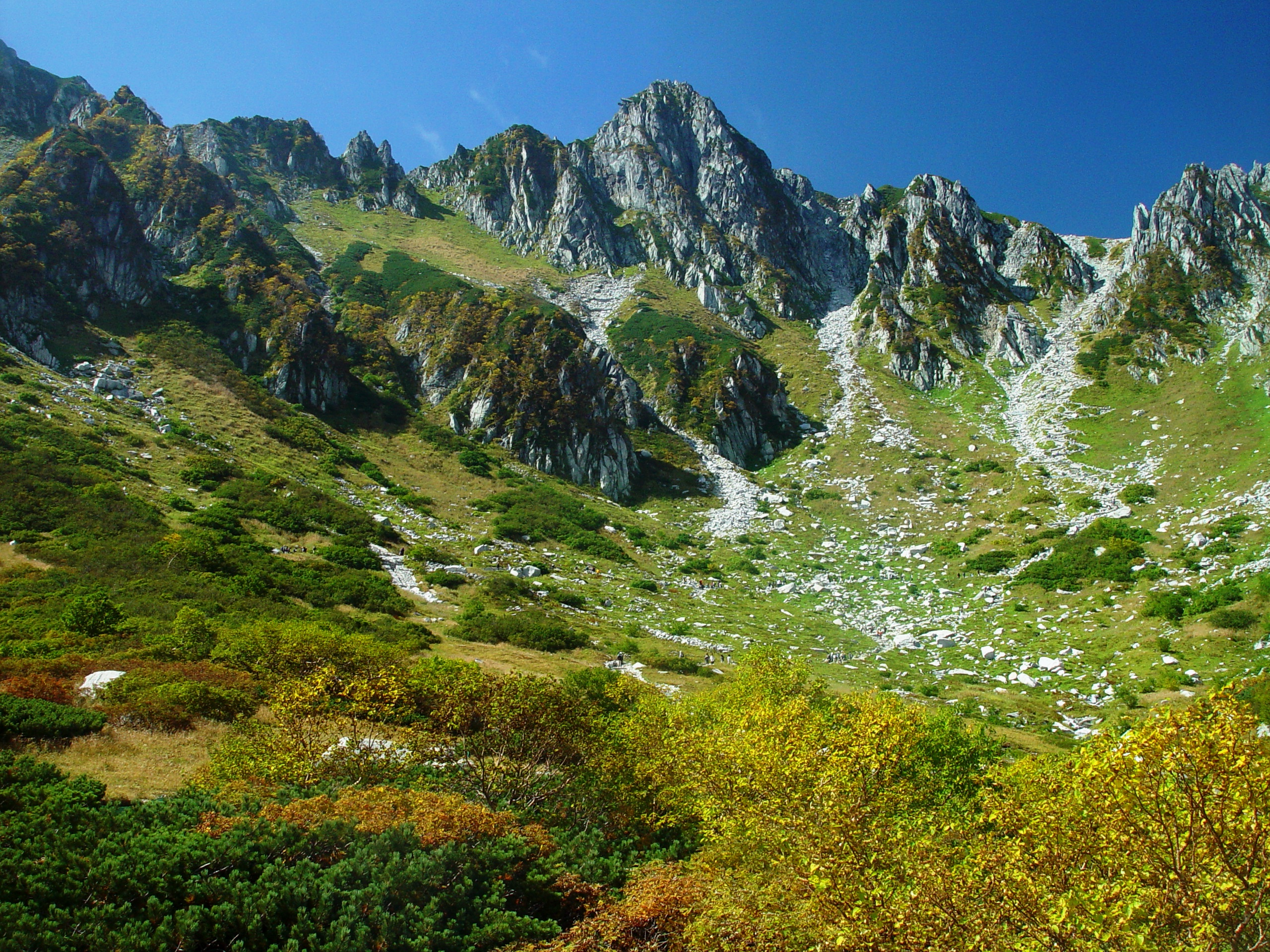
Mount Hōken(left) and Senjōjiki Cirque (September)

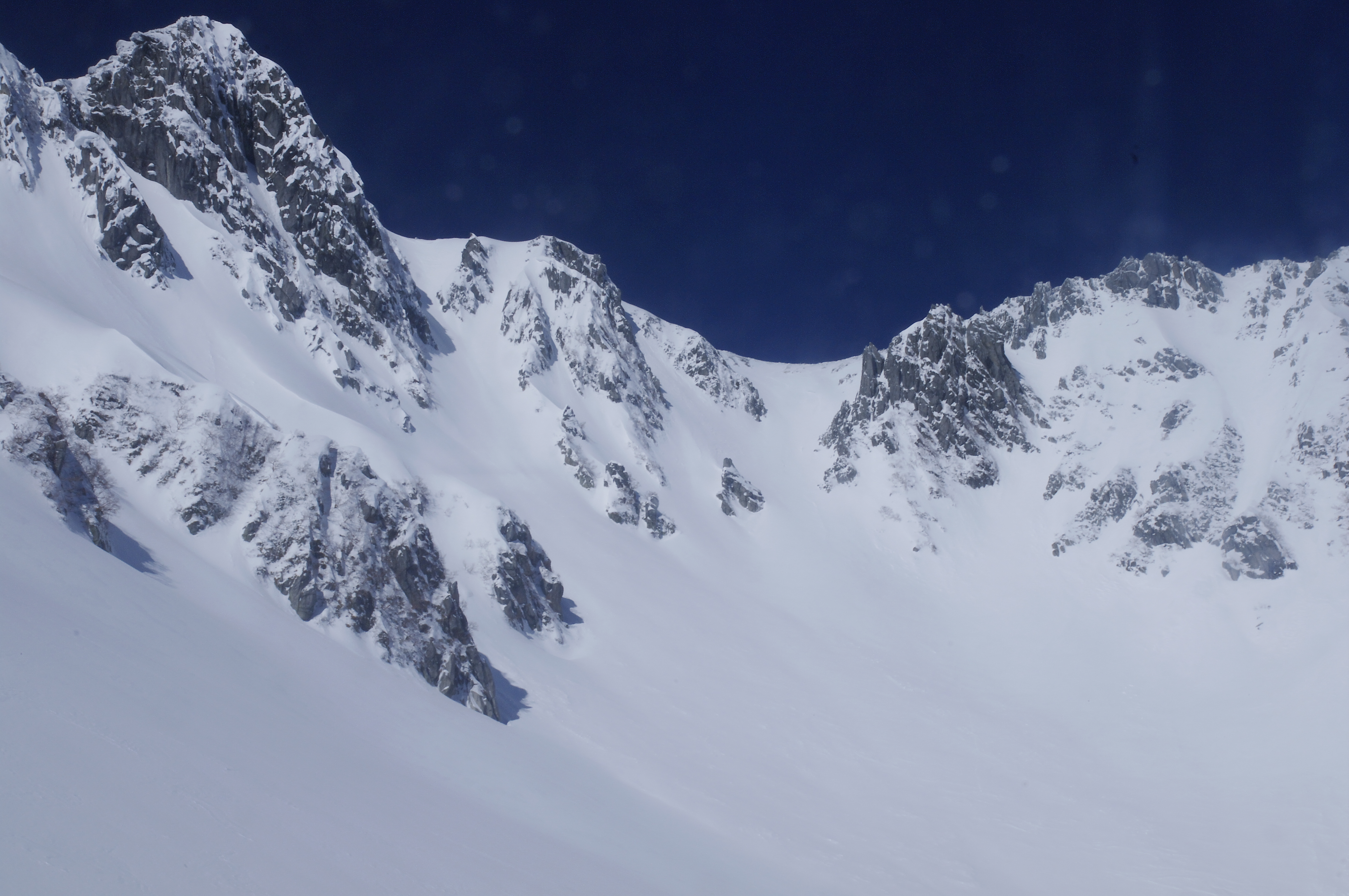
Mount Hōken(left) and Senjōjiki Cirque in February

Senjōjiki Cirque (千畳敷カール) is a cirque (glacial landform) that lies just under Mount Hōken, Kiso Mountains in Nagano prefecture, Japan. It is called "Senjōjiki Kaaru" in Japanese. "Senjōjiki" means the wideness of 1000 tatami mats.

Access to the cirque is easy via the "Komagatake Ropeway" aerial lift which runs all year from the bottom of cirque. It is useful not only for mountaineers but also by sightseers.

In summer, it is filled by numerous alpine flowers, and in winter it change to snowy mountain landscape. Skiing operates from the middle of April to the end of May.

== The landscape of Senjōjiki Cirque and its formation ==
There are several glacial landforms confirmed near Mount Hōken, such as Senjōjiki cirque, Nogaike cirque, and Snnosawa cirques. Mount Hōken itself is a pyramidal peak made by glacial-erosion. Senjōjiki Cirque is located on the top of Nakagoshodani Valley. It forms typical cirque landscape, with flat cirque bottom, steep cirque wall with naked rock. The bottom of the cirque is about 2600m above sea level. 11 terminal moraines are confirmed around the cirque bottom. Geologist Tatsuto Aoki examined glacial deposits from moraines of Senjojiki and Nogaike cirques, and found they were created 17 to 25 thousands year ago, at the time of the last maximum glacial age.

== Plants around Senjōjiki Cirque ==
In summer, Senjōjiki Cirque is filled by alpine flowers. Communities of Veratrum viride, Trollius riederianus var. japonicus, Geum pentapetalum, Anemone narcissiflora and others are seen. Botanist Takeo Hayashi confirmed 128 species around Senjōjiki Cirque.

== Avalanches ==
Because of the landscape, avalanches often occur. On 4 January 1995, 6 people were killed in one such event.

== See also ==
- Karasawa Cirque
- Yamasaki Cirque
