= Mount Minamikoma =

Mountain in Nagano Prefecture, Japan

- 南駒ヶ岳
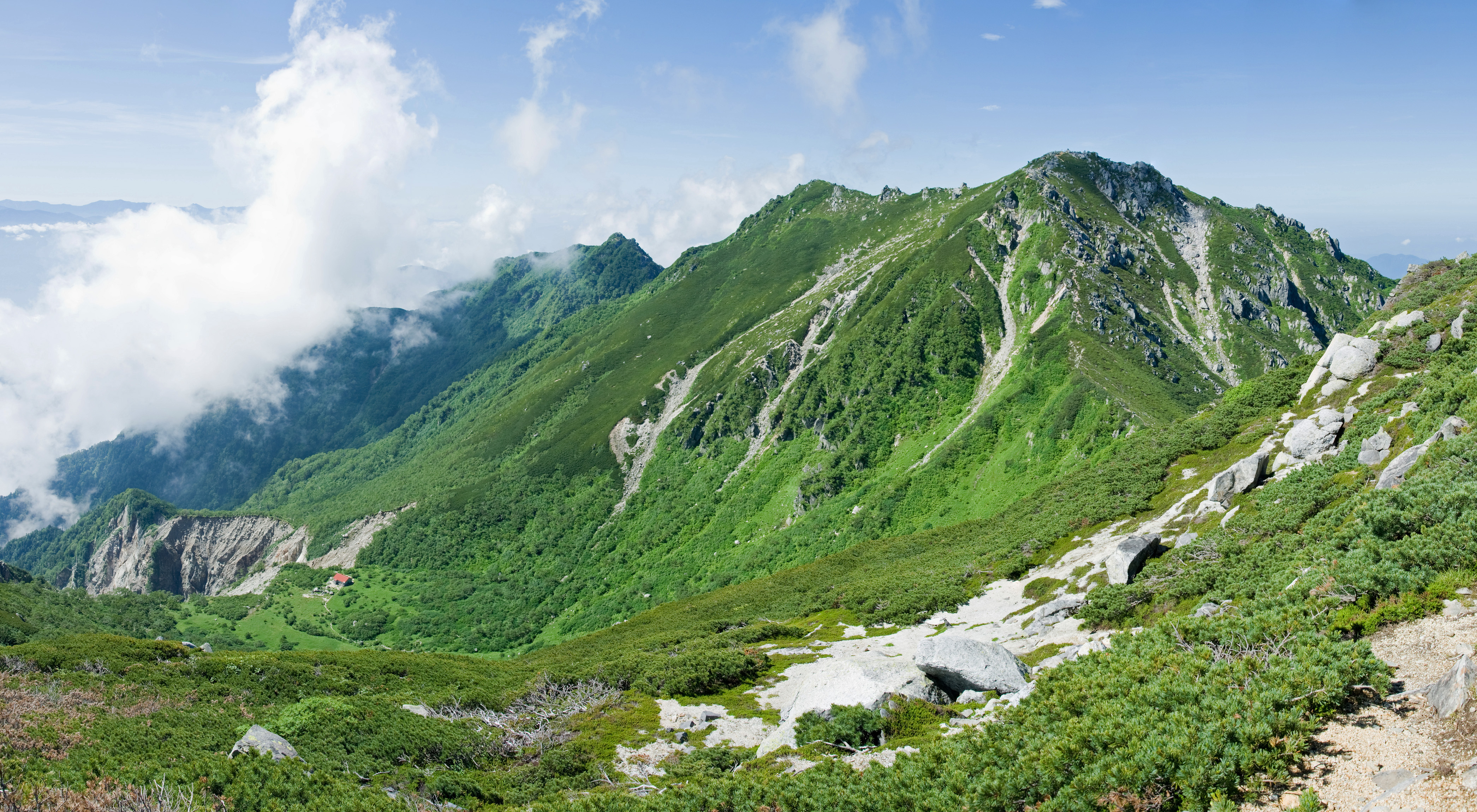
- Mount Minamikoma from Mount Akanagi

Highest point
- Elevation: 2,841 m (9,321 ft)
- Coordinates: 35°42′04″N 137°48′38″E

Geography
- Location: Kiso District and Kamiina District, Nagano Prefecture, Japan
- Parent range: Kiso Mountains

Mount Minamikoma (南駒ヶ岳, Minamikoma-ga-take) is a mountain located on the border between Okuwa, Kiso District, and Iijima, Kamiina District, Nagano Prefecture, in the Chūbu region of Japan. It is 2,841 m (9,321 ft) tall and part of the Kiso Mountains. It is also included on the list of "200 Famous Japanese Mountains."

== Gallery ==
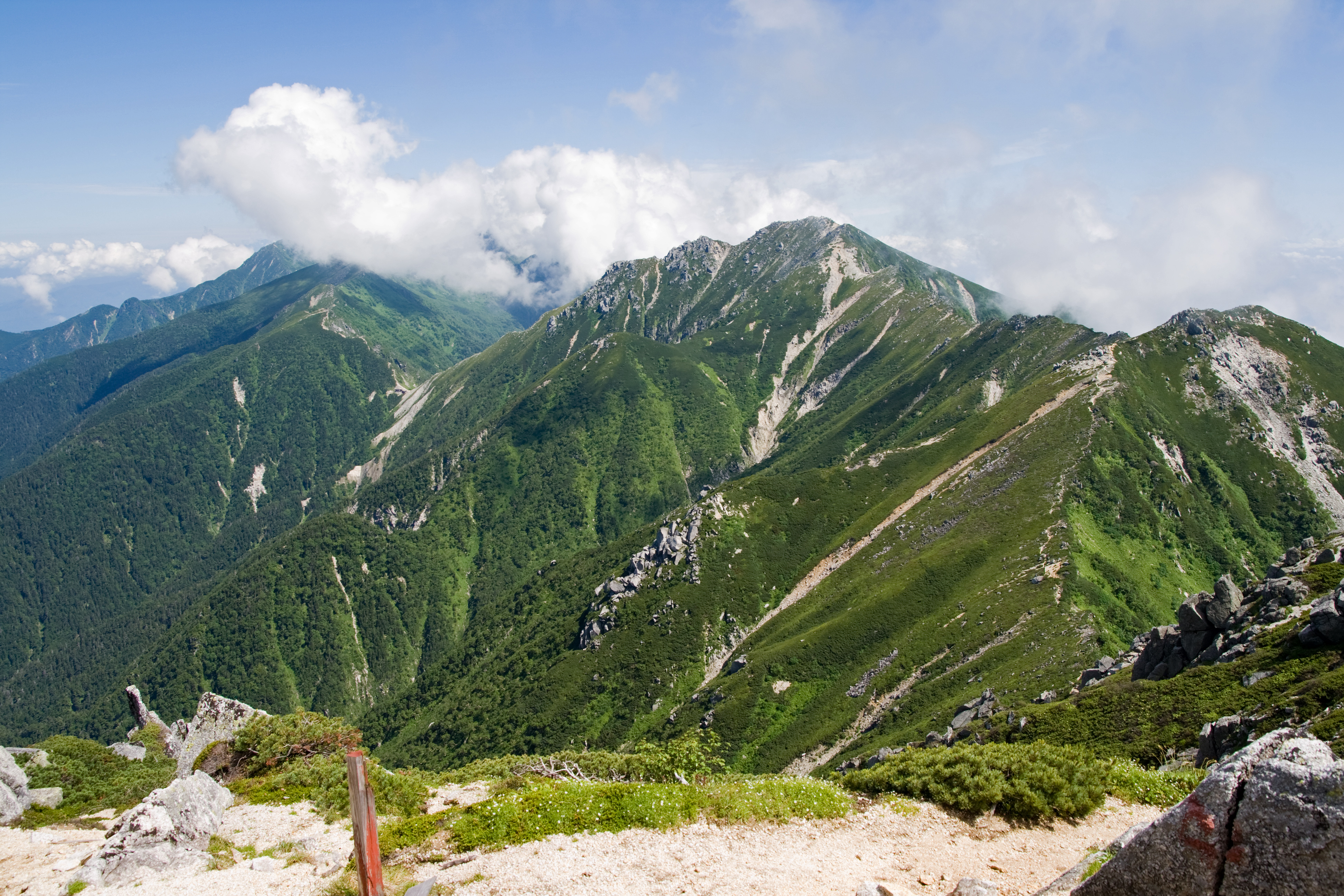
The view from the summit toward north.

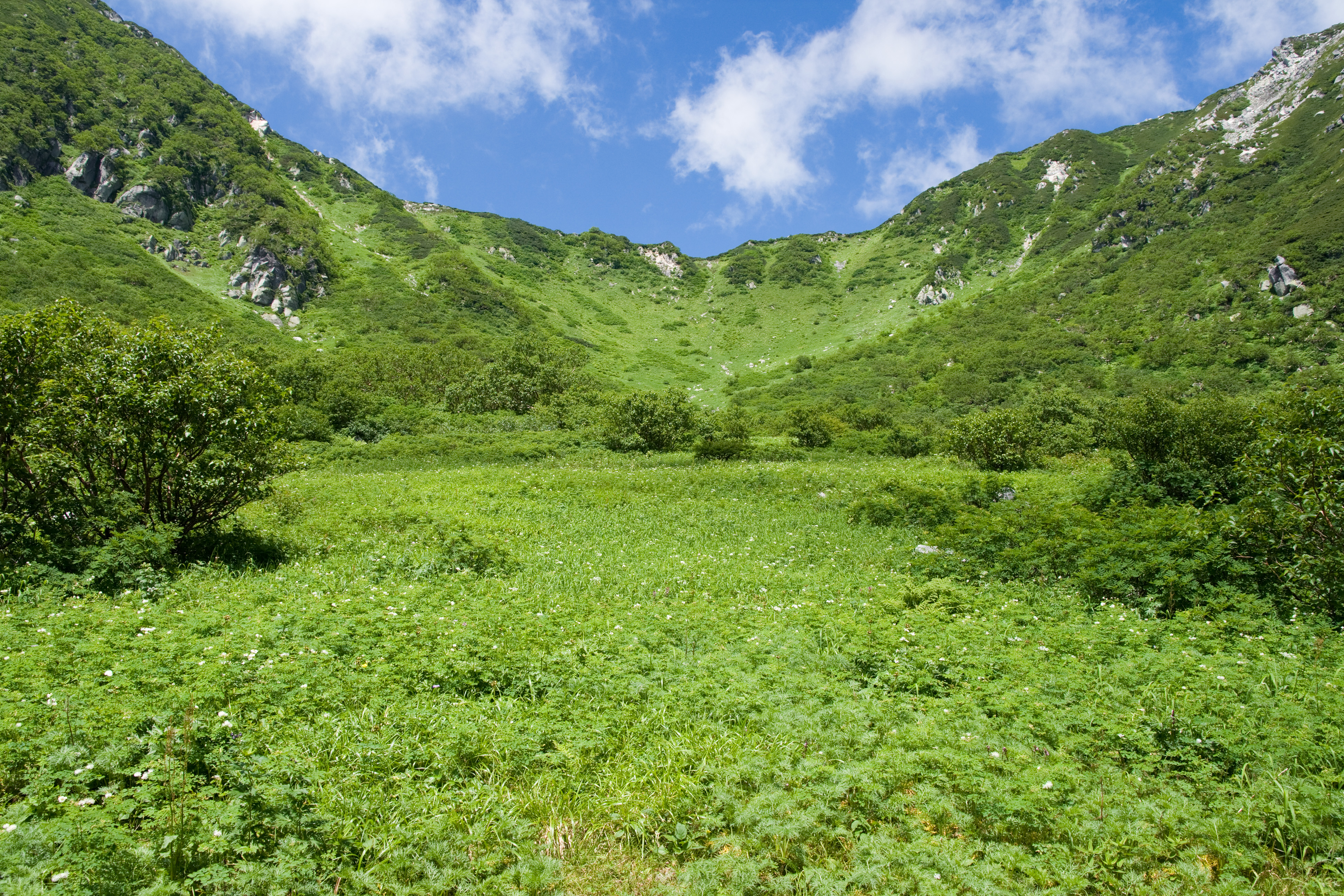
Suribachikubo cirque located on the Southeast side of Mount Minamikoma.

== See also ==
- Kiso Mountains
- Mount Utsugi
- Mount Akanagi
