= Utsugi =

Utsugi may refer to:

- Mount Utsugi, a mountain of Nagano Prefecture, Japan
- Utsugi, a character in the video game Inuyasha: The Secret of the Cursed Mask

== People with the surname ==
- Reika Utsugi (宇津木 麗華, born 1963), Japanese softball player
- Rumi Utsugi (宇津木 瑠美, born 1988), Japanese women's footballer
