= Walter Weston =

English missionary and mountain climber (1860–1940)

The Reverend Walter Weston FRGS
- Born: 25 December 1861; Derby, England
- Died: 27 March 1940 (aged 78); Kensington, London, England
- Education: Derby School
- Alma mater: Clare College, Cambridge; Ridley Hall, Cambridge
- Spouse: Frances Emily Fox (m. 1902)
- Religion: Christianity
- Church: Anglicanism

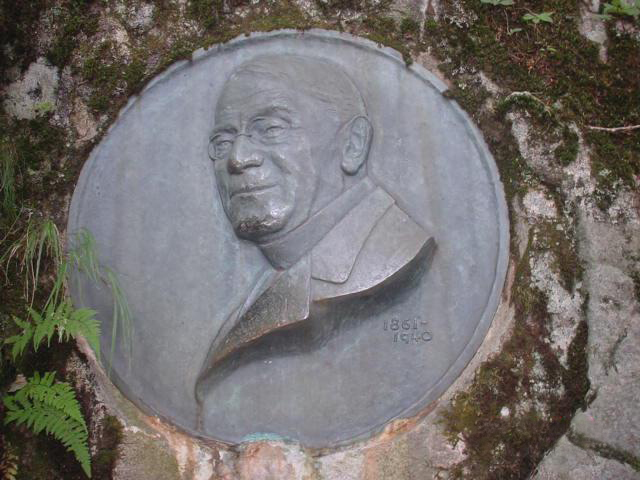
The Reverend Walter Weston – memorial plaque at Kamikōchi in the Japanese Alps

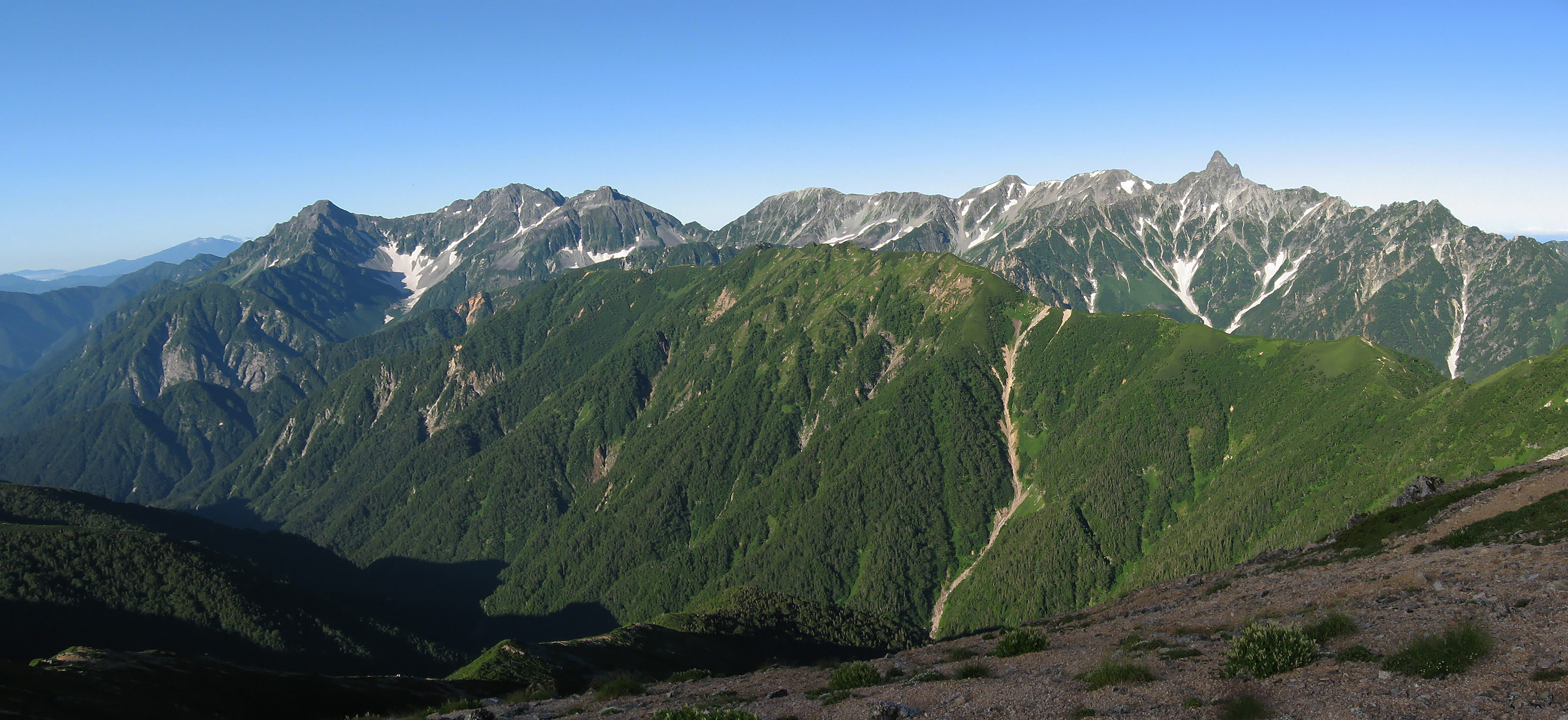
Japanese Alps

Walter Weston (25 December 1861 – 27 March 1940) was an English clergyman and Anglican missionary who helped popularise recreational mountaineering in Japan at the turn of the 20th century.

== Background and early life ==
Weston was born 25 December 1861 at 22 Parker Street, Derby, England, the sixth son of John Weston, an elastic manufacturer, and his wife, Emma Britland. He was educated at Derby School between 1876 and 1880, where he held the school record for running the mile distance (viz., four minutes, 47 seconds). He then went up to Clare College, Cambridge, graduating BA in 1883 and MA in 1887. He studied for the Church of England's priesthood at Ridley Hall, Cambridge. He played six times for Derby County F.C. in their inaugural season, 1884–85.

== Early career ==
Ordained a deacon in 1885, priest in 1886, Weston was appointed curate of St John's, Reading, Berkshire, in 1885. He was already a mountaineer, and in 1886 and 1887 spent periods climbing in the Alps.

== Weston in Japan ==
Weston went to Japan as a missionary of the Church of England's Church Missionary Society in 1888, working first at Kumamoto, then serving as chaplain in Kobe from 1889 to 1895. Alternating between postings to parishes in England, Weston spent a total of fifteen years in various ministries of the Anglican Church in Japan between 1888 and 1915 including service as a SPG sponsored missionary at St. Andrew's Cathedral and Christ Church, Yokohama.

He began mountain climbing while expressing a strong interest in Japanese landscapes, traditions, customs and culture. He published Mountaineering and Exploration in the Japanese Alps (1896). As a writer and lecturer he continued to introduce Japan to an overseas audience. He gave universal currency to the term Japanese Alps, though it was first used before he came to Japan. He was instrumental in the establishment of the Japanese Alpine Club in 1906, and became its first honorary member.

=== Legacy in Japan ===
Weston and Edward Bramwell Clarke are the westerners identified with the emergence of mountain climbing as a new sport in Japan. In the past in Japan, climbing steep high peaks was considered to be an act of practicing Shinto, Shugendō and Buddhism and was hardly considered a sport. By the end of Weston's life, some British climbers referred to him as 'the father of mountaineering in Japan'. In 1937, Emperor Hirohito conferred on him the Japanese Order of the Sacred Treasures (fourth class). The Japanese Alpine Club erected a bronze tablet in his honour at Kamikōchi in the Japanese Alps.

The Weston Park of Mount Ena was made in October 2001. Each year on 11 May, the Weston festival at the park opens the climbing season in the Japanese Northern Alps.

== Later career ==
After returning to England during the First World War, Weston settled in London and became an active member of the Alpine Club of Great Britain, the Japan Society of London (serving on its council), and the Royal Geographical Society, which in 1917 awarded him its Back Award and a Fellowship for his work in Japan.

He was a lecturer for Cambridge University and the Gilchrist Educational Trust and established himself as a writer.

== Family ==
On 3 April 1902, prior to the start of Weston's second extended stay in Japan, he married Frances Emily, second daughter of Sir Francis Fox, a prominent civil engineer. Frances accompanied Weston on many of his expeditions in the Japanese Alps.

== Books ==
Weston's published books include:

- Mountaineering and Exploration in the Japanese Alps (1896)
- The Playground of the Far East (1918)
- A Wayfarer in Unfamiliar Japan (1925)
- Japan (1926)

== See also ==
- Anglo-Japanese relations
- Anglican Church in Japan
