= Mount Akanagi =

Mountain of the Kiso Mountains

- 赤椰岳
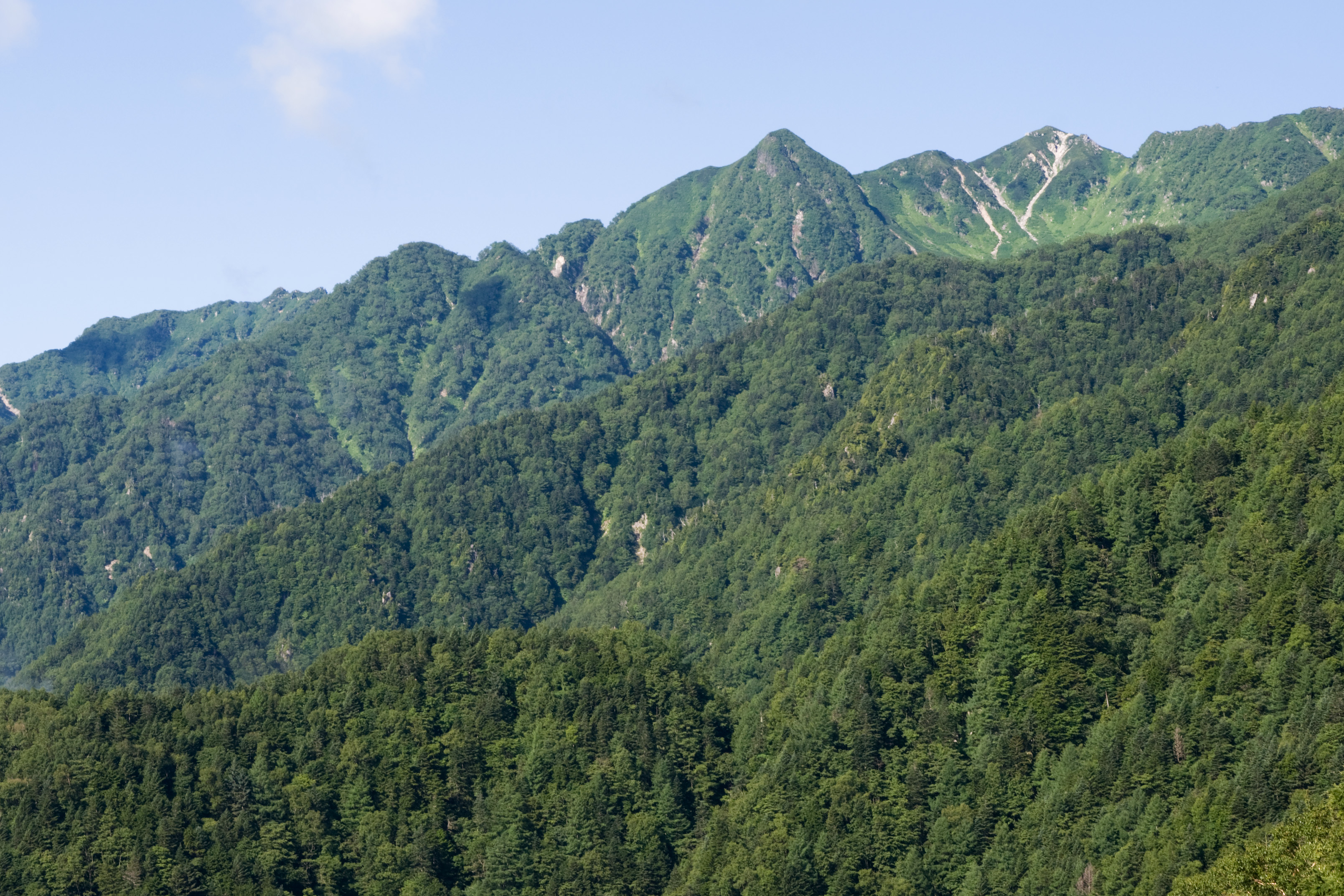
- Mount Akanagi from Ikeyama ridge

Highest point
- Elevation: 2,798 m (9,180 ft)
- Coordinates: 35°42′23″N 137°48′56″E

Geography
- Location within Japan
- Location: Kiso District and Kamiina District, Nagano Prefecture, Japan
- Parent range: Kiso Mountains

Mount Akanagi (赤椰岳, Akanagidake) is a mountain of the Kiso Mountains and located on the border between Okuwa, Kiso District, and Iijima, Kamiina District, Nagano Prefecture, in the Chūbu region of Japan. Its peak is 2,798 m (9,180 ft) high.

== Gallery ==
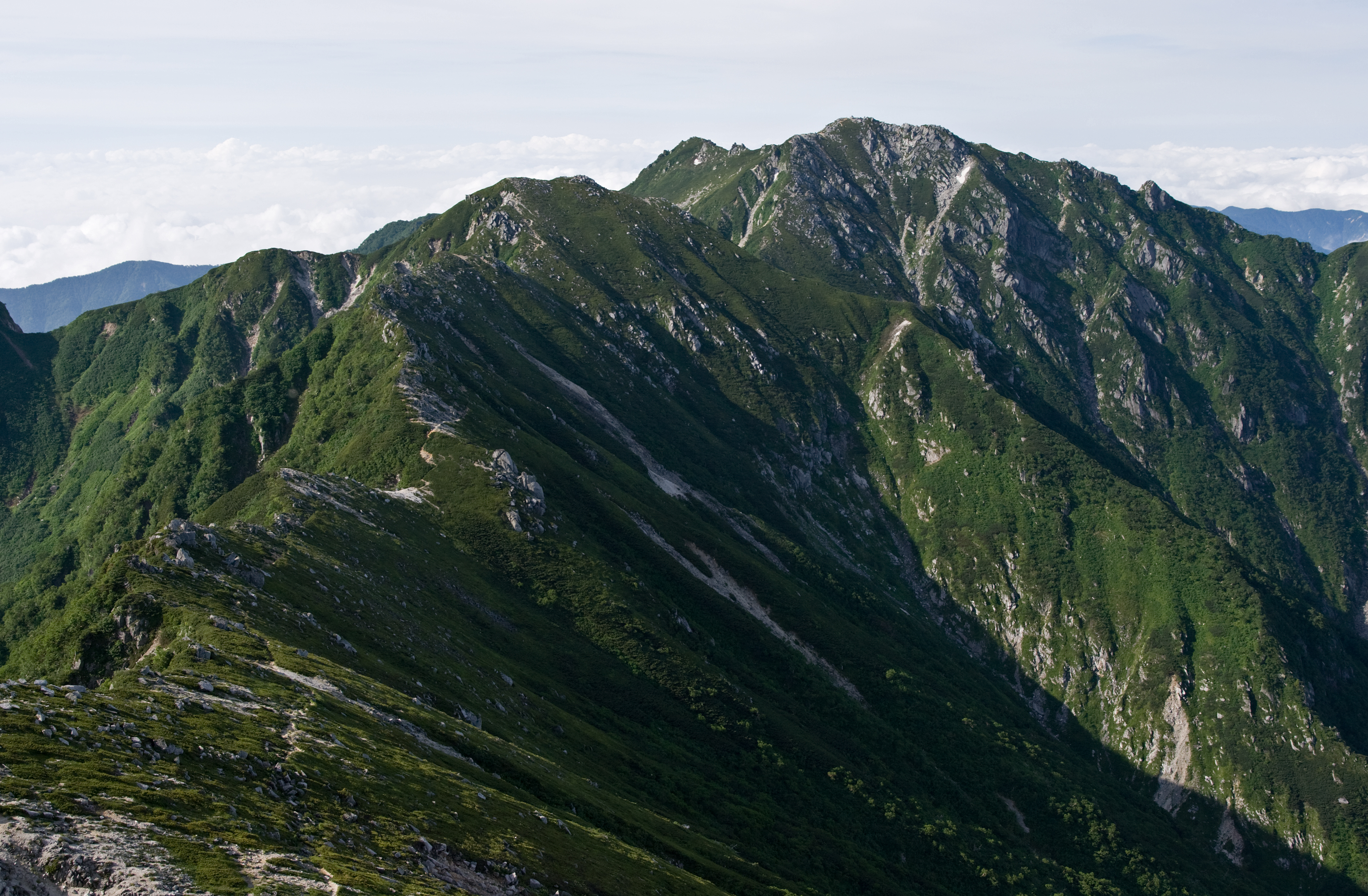
Mt.Minamikoma and Mt.Akanagi from Mt.Utsugi.

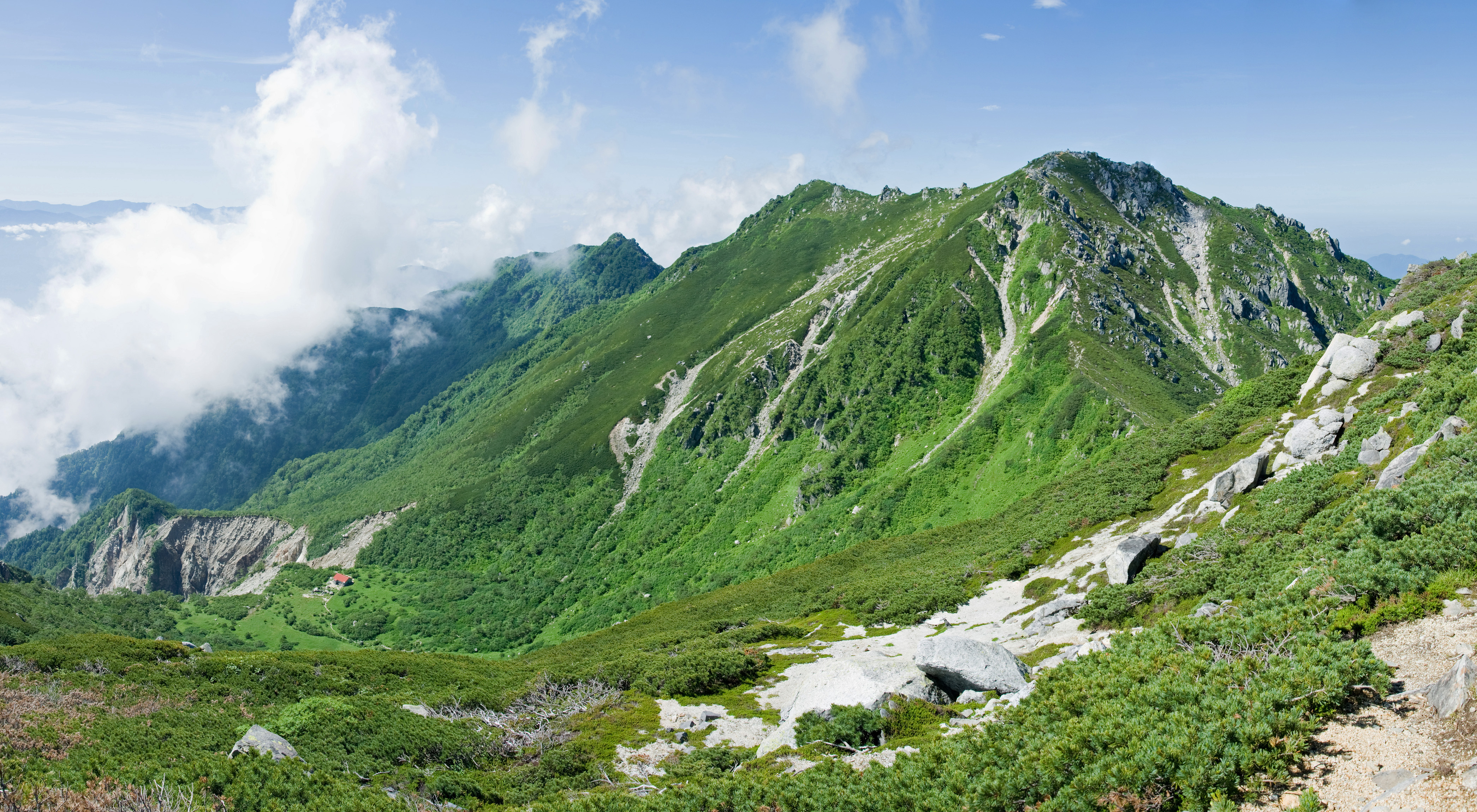
The view from the summit toward south.
