= Komagatake Ropeway =

Japanese aerial lift line

Coordinates: 35°46′22″N 137°49′24.2″E

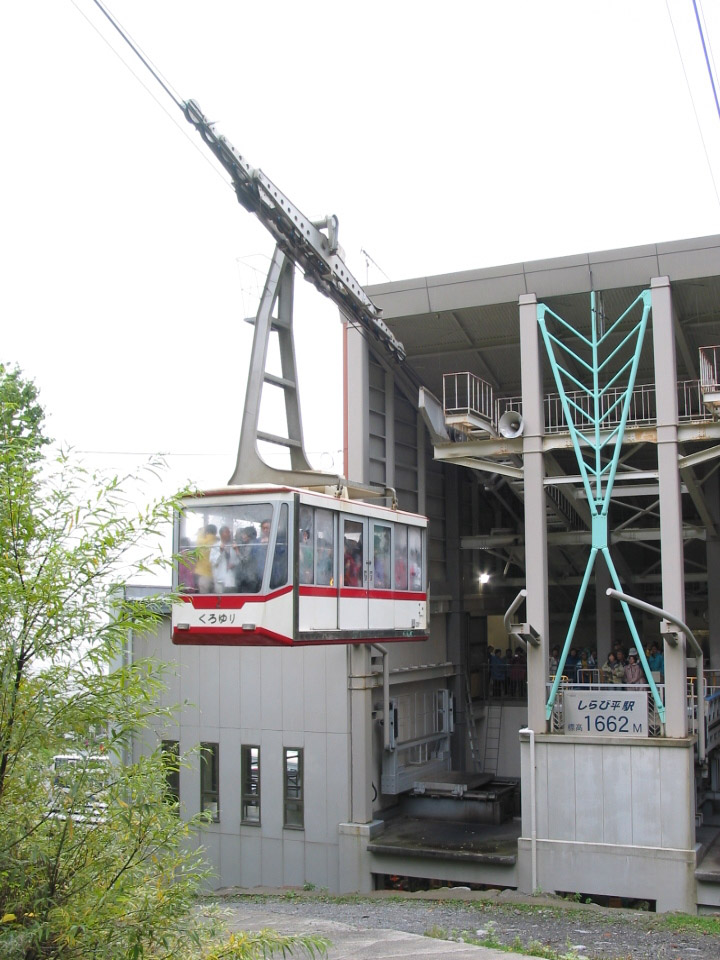
Shirabidaira Station.

Komagatake Ropeway (駒ヶ岳ロープウェイ, Komagatake Rōpuwei) is an aerial lift line in the Kiso Mountains range, Nagano Prefecture, Japan.

== Description ==
The line, opened in 1967, climbs up to Senjōjiki Cirque 2600m above sea level, and it is easiest route to Mount Kisokoma and Mount Hōken. Summit station, Senjōjiki, is known as the station with the highest altitude in the country, 2,611.5 m (8,567.9 ft). The Kiso Mountains are the "Central Alps" of the scenic Japanese Alps group, located on central Honshu.

The Chūō Arupusu Kankō company operates Central Alps sightseeing line. The company is a member of Meitetsu Group (Nagoya Railroad), and also operates hotels and ski resorts.

=== Specifications ===
- System: Aerial tramway, 1 track cable and 2 haulage ropes
- Distance: 2.3 kilometres (1.4 mi)
- Vertical interval: 950 m (3,117 ft)
  - The largest in Japan.
- Passenger capacity per a cabin: 61
- Stations: 2

Summit:Senjōjiki station (also equipped Hotel Senjōjiki) Bottom: Shirabidaira station

- Time required for single ride: 7 minutes, 30 seconds.

== See also ==
- Kiso Mountains topics
- List of aerial lifts in Japan
