= Mount Ena =

Peak on the Kiso Mountains, Chūbu, Japan

- 恵那山
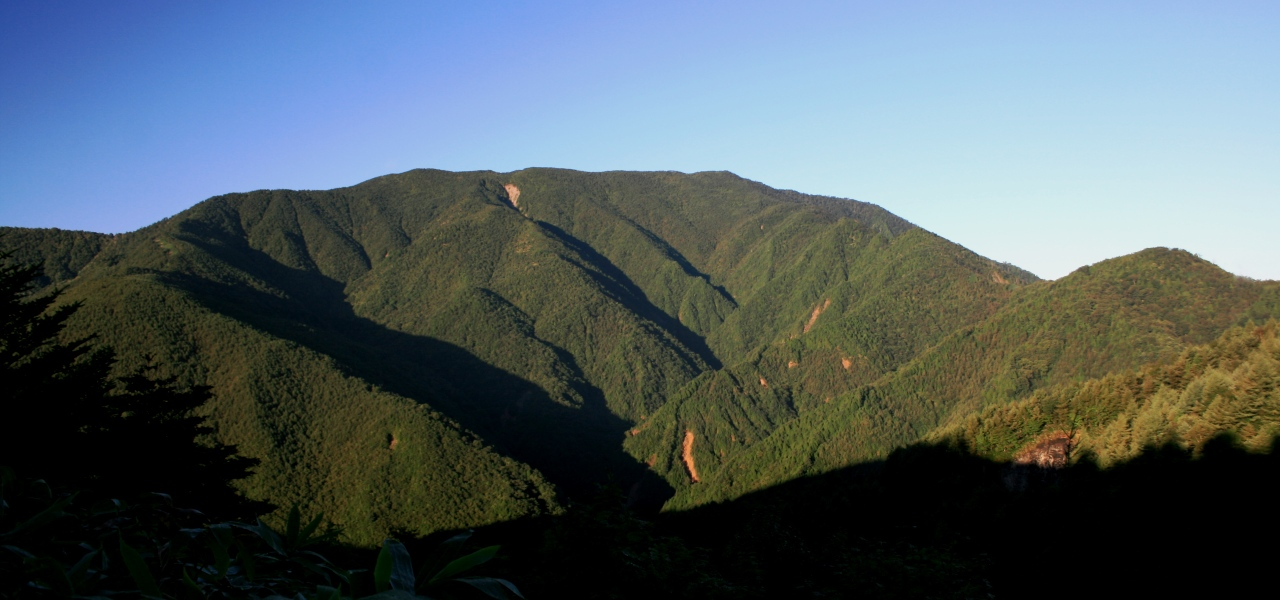

Highest point
- Elevation: 2,191 m (7,188 ft)
- Listing: Mountains and hills of Japan
- Coordinates: 35°26′35″N 137°35′49″E

Geography
- Location within Japan
- Location: Nakatsugawa, Gifu Prefecture; Achi, Nagano Prefecture; Japan
- Parent range: Kiso Mountains

Mount Ena (恵那山, Ena-san) is a mountain peak of the Kiso Mountains in the Chūbu region of Japan.

== Geography ==
Mount Ena is 2,191 m (7,188 ft) in elevation. It is located on the border between Nakatsugawa in Gifu Prefecture and Achi in Nagano Prefecture.

The mountain is on the list of landmark "100 Famous Japanese Mountains." The Kiso Mountains are the "Central Alps" of the scenic Japanese Alps group, located on central Honshu.

== Ascents ==
=== Hiking routes ===
There are four hiking routes to the summit of Mount Ena:

- Kuroisawa Route (黒井沢ルート)
- Misaka Pass Route (神坂峠ルート)
- Hirogawara Route (広河原ルート)
- Maemiya Route (前宮ルート)

=== Summit views ===
The Japanese Alps ranges, Mount Ontake, Mount Haku, and part of Mount Fuji can be seen from the summit of Mount Ena.

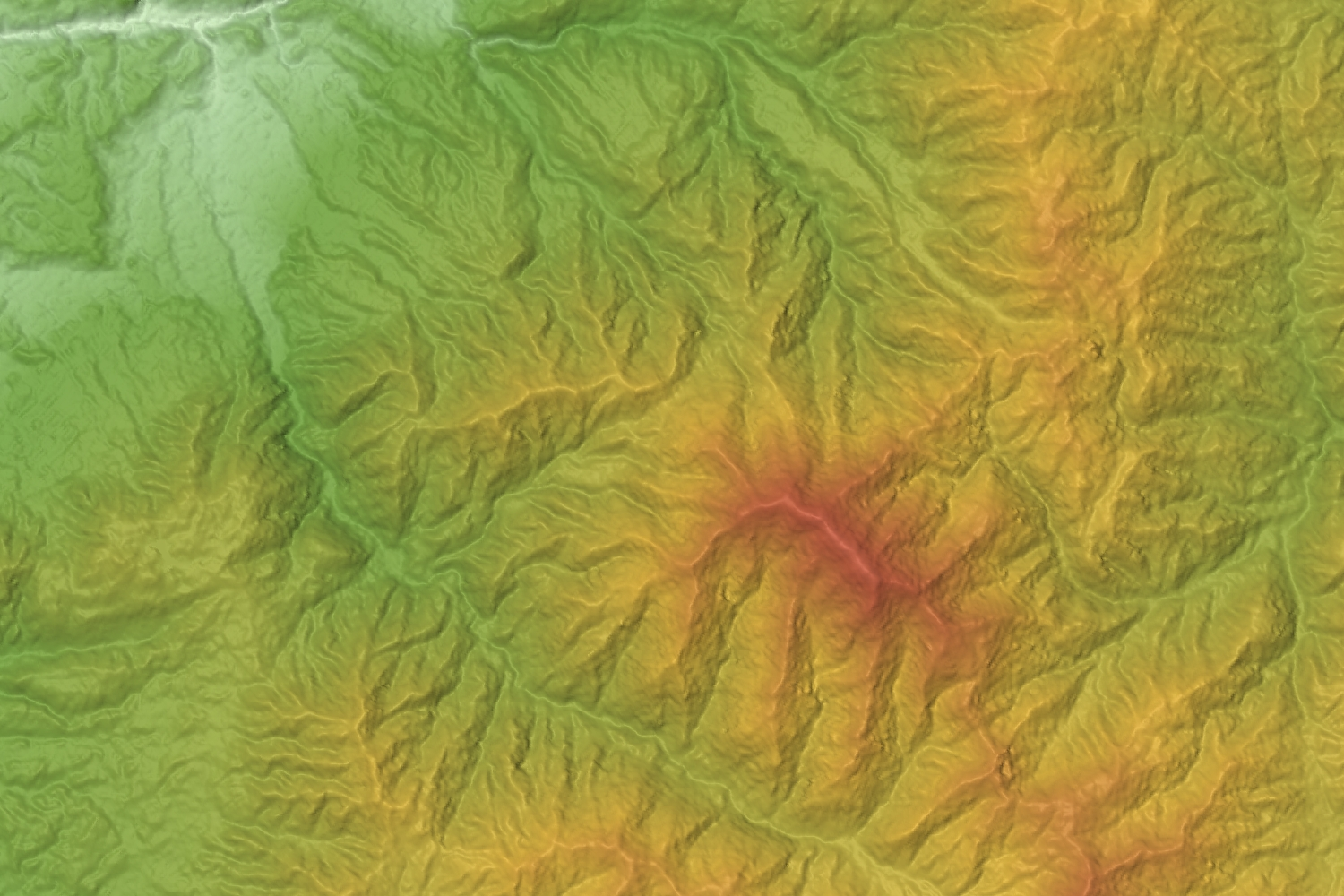
Relief Map

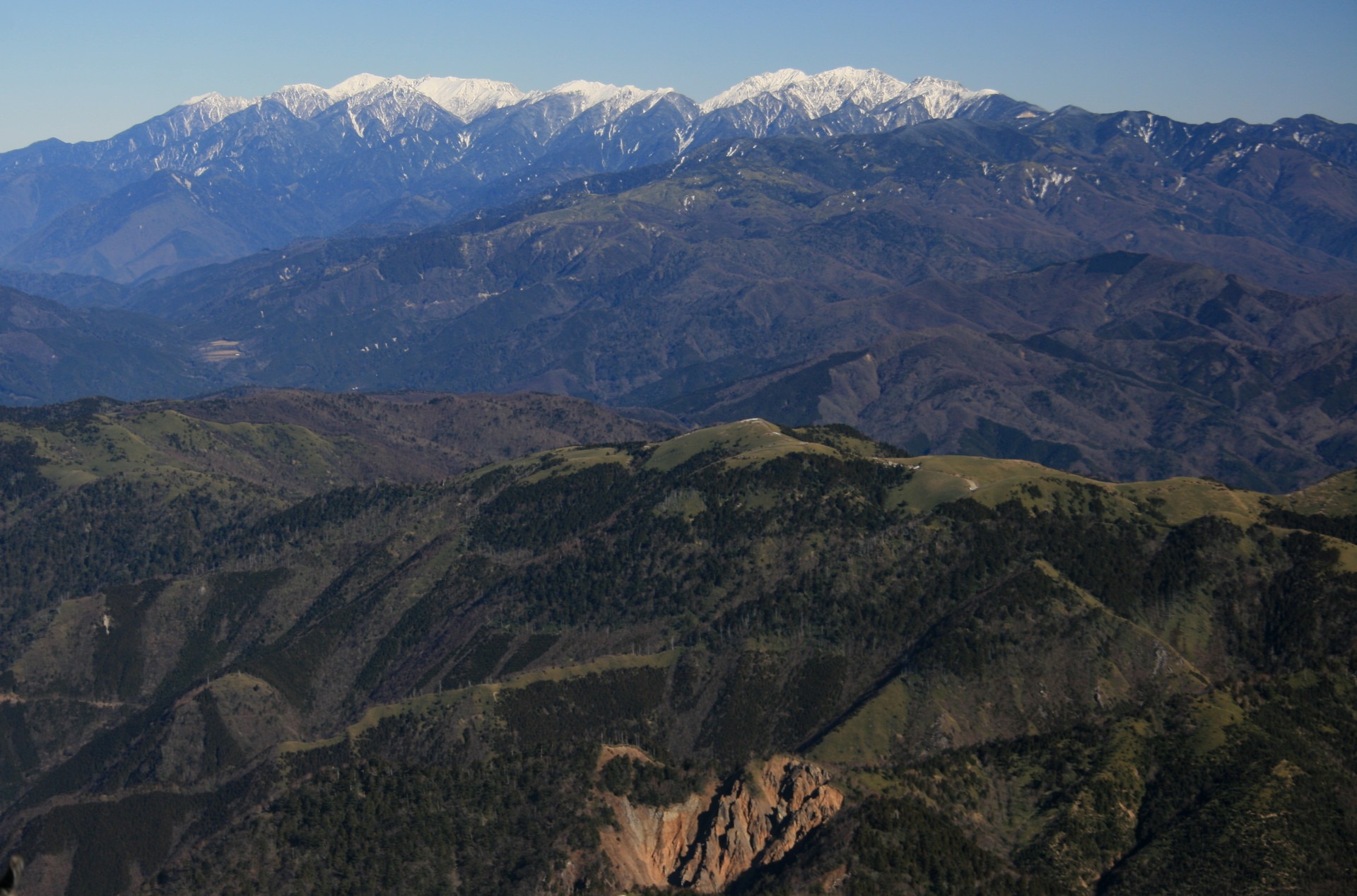
The Kiso Mountains—Central Alps

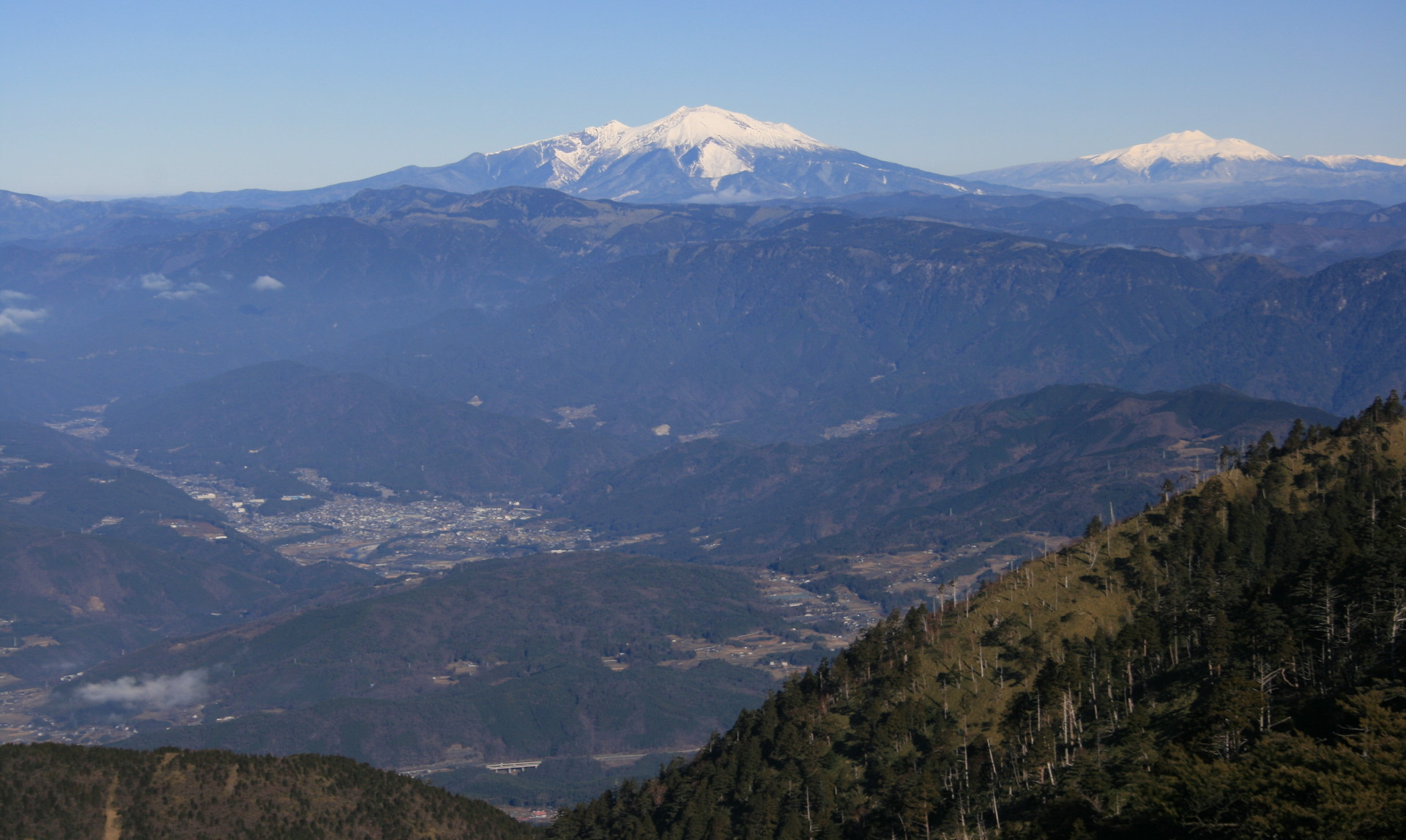
Mount Ontake and Mount Norikura

== See also ==
- Kiso Mountains
- 100 Famous Japanese Mountains
- Before the Dawn — novel by Tōson Shimazaki.
