= Mount Hōken =

Mountain in Japan

Mount Hoken
- 宝剣岳
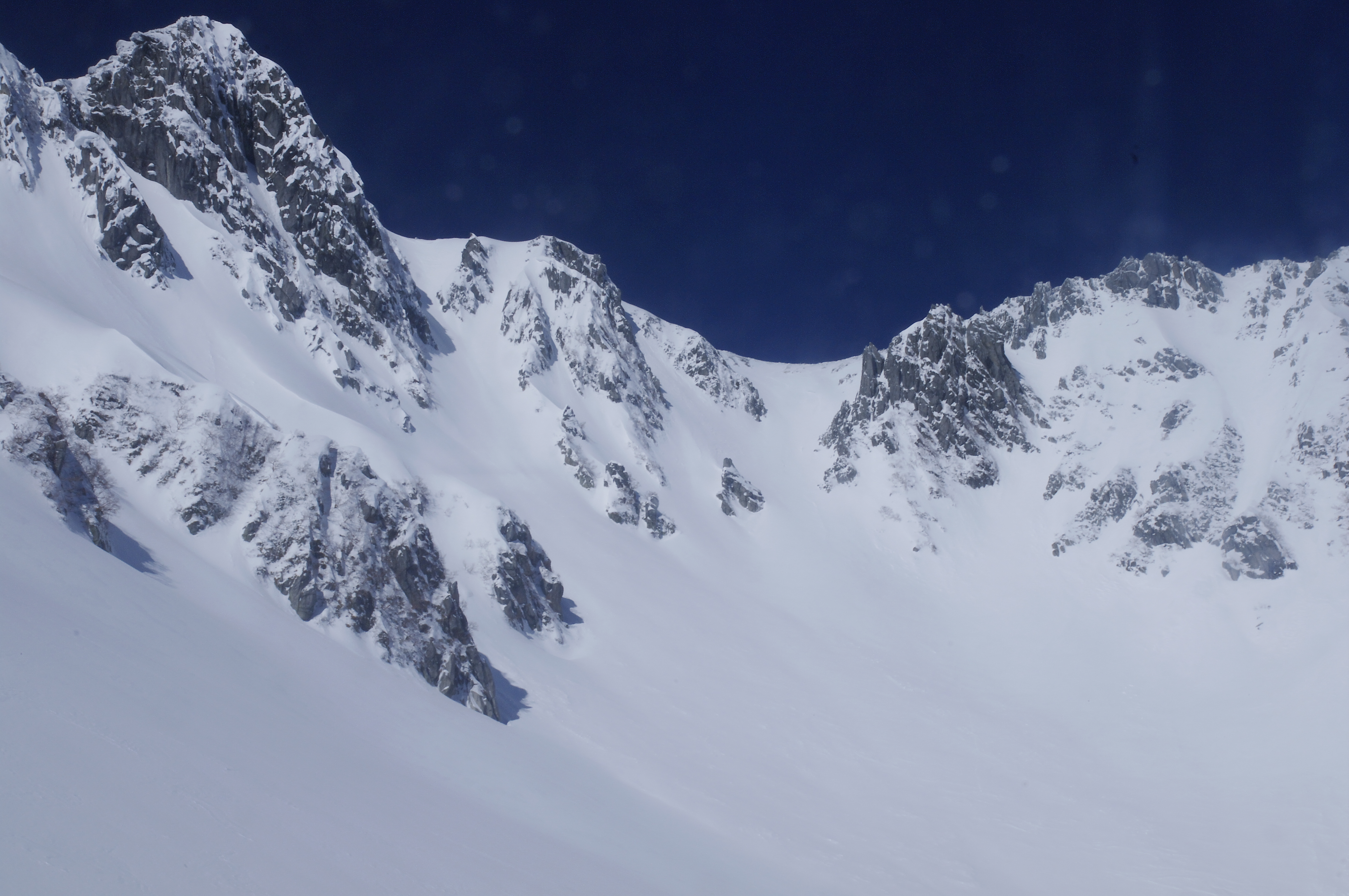
- Mount Hoken (left) from Senjojiki Cirque

Highest point
- Elevation: 2,931 m (9,616 ft)
- Coordinates: 35°46′53″N 137°48′33″E

Naming
- Language of name: Japanese

Geography
- Location within Japan
- Location: Chūbu region, Honshū, Japan
- Parent range: Kiso Mountains

Climbing
- Easiest route: Ropeway

Mount Hōken (宝剣岳 (Hōken-Dake)) is one of major peaks in Kiso Mountains or Central Alps, Nagano Prefecture, Japan. It is 2,931 m (9,616 ft) high, and its shape is sharp pyramidal peak.

== Geography ==
Mount Hōken is located on the main ridgeline of Kiso mountains, about 1km south of Mount Kisokoma, the highest peak of Kiso Mountains. On the East of Mount Hōken lies great Senjōjiki Cirque. Komagatake Ropeway bring you up to the bottom of Cirque which is about 2600m above sea level. Senjojiki Cirque is one of the largest and the most typical cirque in Japan, and it means one thousand tatami mattresses. In summer, it is filled by alpine flowers. According to geologist Tatsuto Aoki, the cirque was created 17,000 to 25,000 years ago, the last glacial maximum age.

== Mountaineering ==
Though it is easy to go up to Senjojiki by Ropeway, nearby the rocky peak of Mount Hōken is very steep and dangerous, often occurs accident falling down to death. On the shoulder of the peak is Hōken Hut, Tengu Hut. And upper stages of "Senjojiki Station" of Komagatake Ropeway exist "Senjojiki Hotel". Inside Senjojiki Cirque, promenades are equipped.

== Name of the mountain ==
"Hōken" means treasure sword, especially meaning the sword of Acala Buddha. It resembles the shape of the peak. In Edo era, the mountain was called "Shakujō-dake". "Shakujou" means "Buddhist monk's staff". This mountain was regarded as sacred.

== Alpine plants ==
Pinus pumila	Dicentra peregrina	Leontopodium shinanense	Campanula chamissonis	Rhodiola rosea	Gentiana algida
