= Mount Kisokoma =

Mountain in Nagano Prefecture, Japan

- 木曽駒ヶ岳
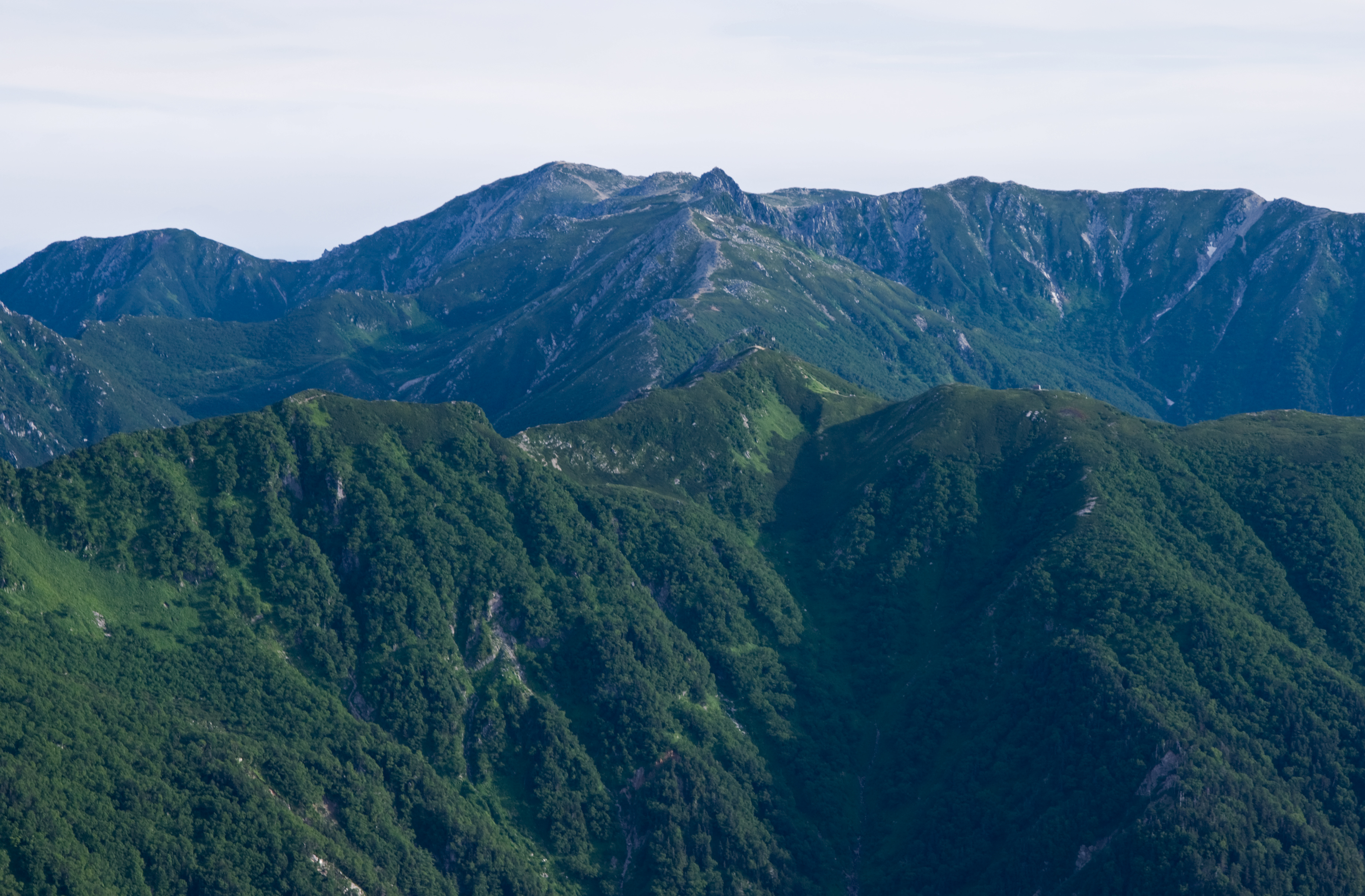
- Mount Kisokoma from Mount Utsugi

Highest point
- Elevation: 2,956 m (9,698 ft)
- Prominence: 1,751 m (5,745 ft)
- Listing: Ultra
- Coordinates: 35°47′21″N 137°48′12″E

Geography
- Location within Japan
- Location: Kiso District and Kamiina, Nagano Prefecture, Japan
- Parent range: Kiso Mountains

Climbing
- Easiest route: Komagatake Ropeway

Mount Kisokoma (木曽駒ヶ岳, Kisokoma-ga-take) is a mountain located in Miyada, Kamiina District, and Kiso and Agematsu, Kiso District, Nagano Prefecture, in the Chūbu region of Japan. It is 2,956 m (9,698 ft) tall and is the tallest peak in the Kiso Mountains. It is also included on the list of "100 Famous Japanese Mountains." Sometimes its name is just shortened to Kisokoma. Alternative kanji for the name are 木曾駒ヶ岳 (Kisokoma-ga-take).

== Geography ==
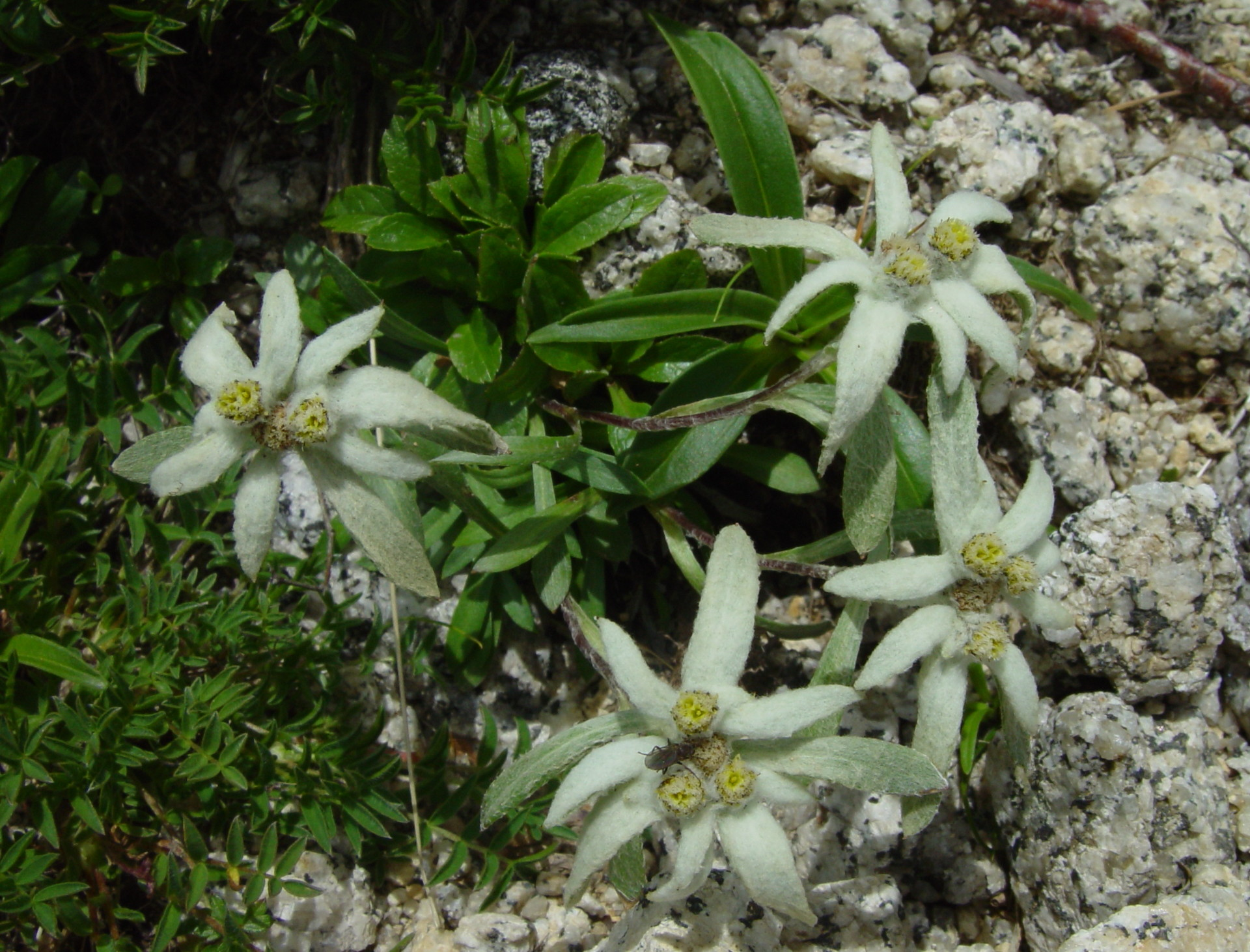
Leontopodium shinanense of Leontopodium in Mount Kisokoma

The Ina Valley is located between the "two Koma Mountains." Mount Kisokoma is referred to as the western of the two mountains, while Mount Kaikoma is referred to as the eastern one. The mountain consists of Granite. The upper part of the mountain range is the Tree line, and many Alpine plants grow naturally. Leontopodium shinanense of Leontopodium is the Endemism around Mount Kisokoma. It is called Leontopodium shinanense (駒ウスユキソウ, Koma-Usuyukisō) in Japanese. Also, Siberian Dwarf Pine can be seen around the top of the mountain.

The Komagatake Ropeway will take hikers from the base of the mountain up the Senjōjiki Col, a large cirque located 2,650 m (8,694 ft) above sea level, leaving just the last few hundreds meters of the mountain to be scaled.

=== Rivers that become source ===
The following rivers that become the sources flows to the Ise Bay and the Pacific Ocean.

- Name River, Shōzawa River (Tributary of Kiso River)
- Odagiri River, Ōtagiri River (Tributary of Tenryū River)

== Mountaineering and Lodgings ==
There is the Komagatake Ropeway in the east side of Mount Kisokoma. Many tourists and hikers visit the station on the top. There are five mountain huts and one hotel on the mountain. The hotel is named "Hotel Senjōjiki," after the cirque on the mountain. There is one campground near the lodge between Mount Kisokoma and Mount Naka. There are many mountain climbing trails in the surrounding area.

== Scenery of Mount Kisokoma ==
Kiso Mountains and Mountain hut and campground seen from east (Mount Naka)	Mount Kisokoma seen from west (Mount Mugikusa) spring	Mt. Kisokoma and Mt. Hōken and Autumn leaf color seen from north (Mount Shōgigashira) autumn	Senjōjiki Cirque at Mount Hōken summer

== See also ==
- Komagatake Ropeway
- 100 Famous Japanese Mountains
- Mount Hōken
