= Kiso Mountains =

Mountain range in the central part of the Japanese alps

- Central Alps
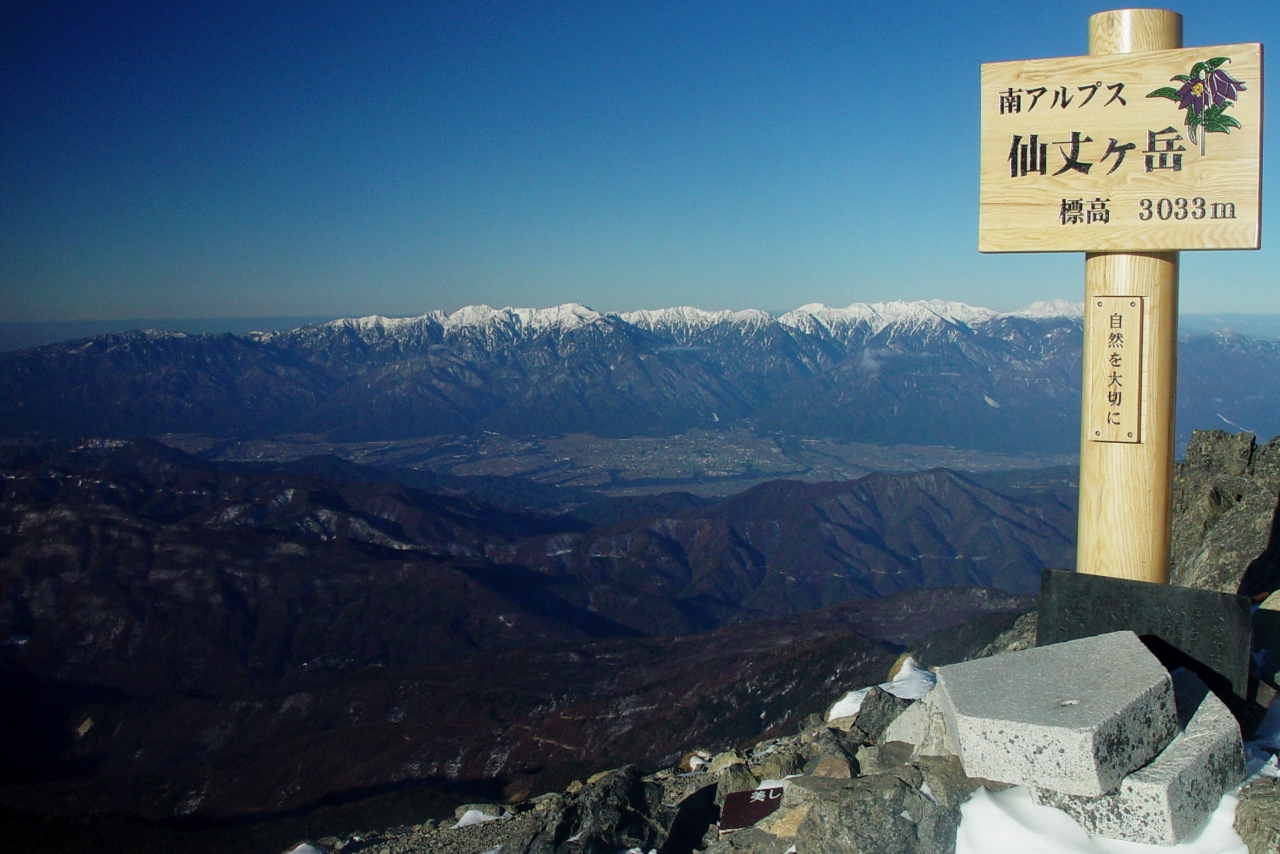
- Kiso Mountains from Mount Senjō in the Akaishi Mountains

Highest point
- Peak: Mount Kisokoma, Kiso District, Nagano Prefecture
- Elevation: 2,956 m (9,698 ft)
- Coordinates: 35°47′22″N 137°48′16″E

Dimensions
- Length: 65 km (40 mi)
- Width: 15 km (9.3 mi)

Naming
- Native name: 木曽山脈 (Japanese); 中央アルプス (Japanese)

Geography
- Country: Japan
- Prefectures: Gifu; Nagano

Kiso Mountains (木曽山脈, Kiso Sanmyaku) are a mountain range in Nagano and Gifu prefectures in Japan. They are also called the Central Alps (中央アルプス, Chūō Arupusu) and they combine with the Hida Mountains ("Northern Alps") and the Akaishi Mountains ("Southern Alps") to form a group collectively known as the Japanese Alps.

== Outline ==
The mountain range consists of granite. The Komagatake Ropeway is on the east side of Mount Kisokoma. A lot of tourists visit the station on the top. The upper part of the mountain range is the tree line, and a lot of alpine plants grow naturally. Leontopodium shinanense of Leontopodium is endemic around Mount Kisokoma.

== Geography ==
=== Major peaks ===
No.	Image	Mountain	Height	Note	Japanese
1		Mount Kyō	2,296.25 m (7,534 ft)	200 famous	経ヶ岳
2		Mount Shōgikashira	2,730 m (8,957 ft)		将棊頭山
3		Mount Kisokoma	2,955.95 m (9,698 ft)	highest in Kiso Mountains; 100 famous	木曽駒ヶ岳
4		Mount Hōken	2,931 m (9,616 ft)	Senjōjiki Cirque	宝剣岳
5		Mount Sannosawa	2,848.48 m (9,345 ft)		三ノ沢岳
6		Mount Hinokio	2,827.74 m (9,277 ft)		檜尾岳
7		Mount Kumasawa	2,778 m (9,114 ft)		熊沢岳
8		Mount Utsugi	2,863.71 m (9,395 ft)	100 famous	空木岳
9		Mount Minamikoma	2,841 m (9,321 ft)	200 famous	南駒ヶ岳
10		Mount Kosumo	2,613.24 m (8,574 ft)	300 famous	越百山
11		Mount Okunenjō	2,303 m (7,556 ft)		奥念丈岳
12		Mount Ampeiji	2,363.14 m (7,753 ft)	200 famous	安平路山
13		Mount Surikogi	2,168.52 m (7,115 ft)		摺古木山
14		Mount Ena	2,191 m (7,188 ft)	100 famous	恵那山
15		Mount Ōkawairi	1,907.74 m (6,259 ft)		大川入山

Foothills

- Mount Nenjō (念丈岳), 2,291 m (7,516 ft)
- Mount Nagiso (南木曽岳), 1,677 m (5,502 ft)
- Mount Kazakoshi (Kiso) (風越山), 1,699 m (5,574 ft)
- Mount Kazakoshi (Ena) (風越山), 1,535 m (5,036 ft)

=== Rivers ===
Rivers with headwaters in the Kiso Mountains drain to Ise Bay of the Pacific Ocean. They include:

- Kiso River
- Tenryū River
Scenery of Kiso Mountains

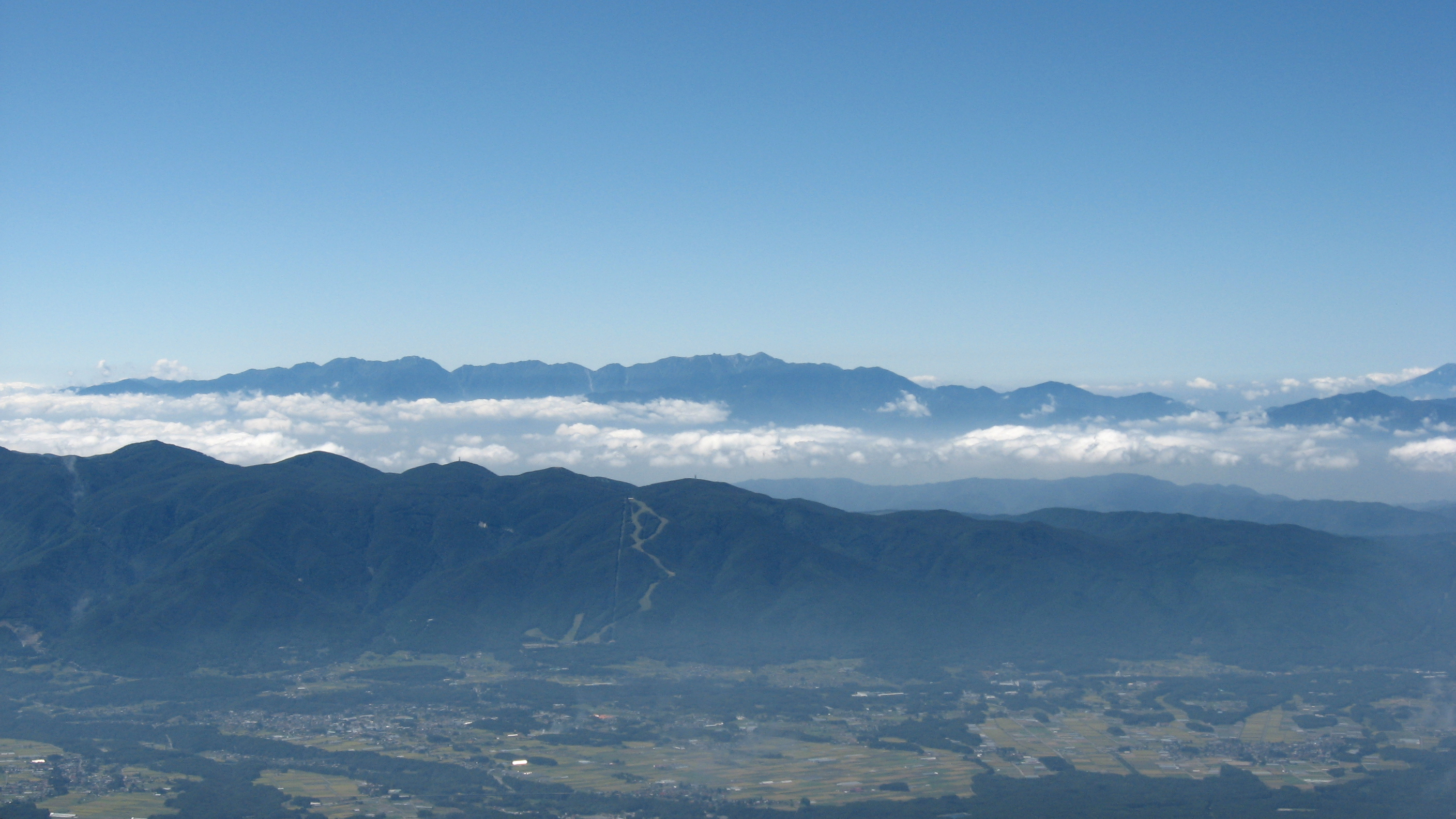
Kiso Mountains seen from east (Mount Amida)

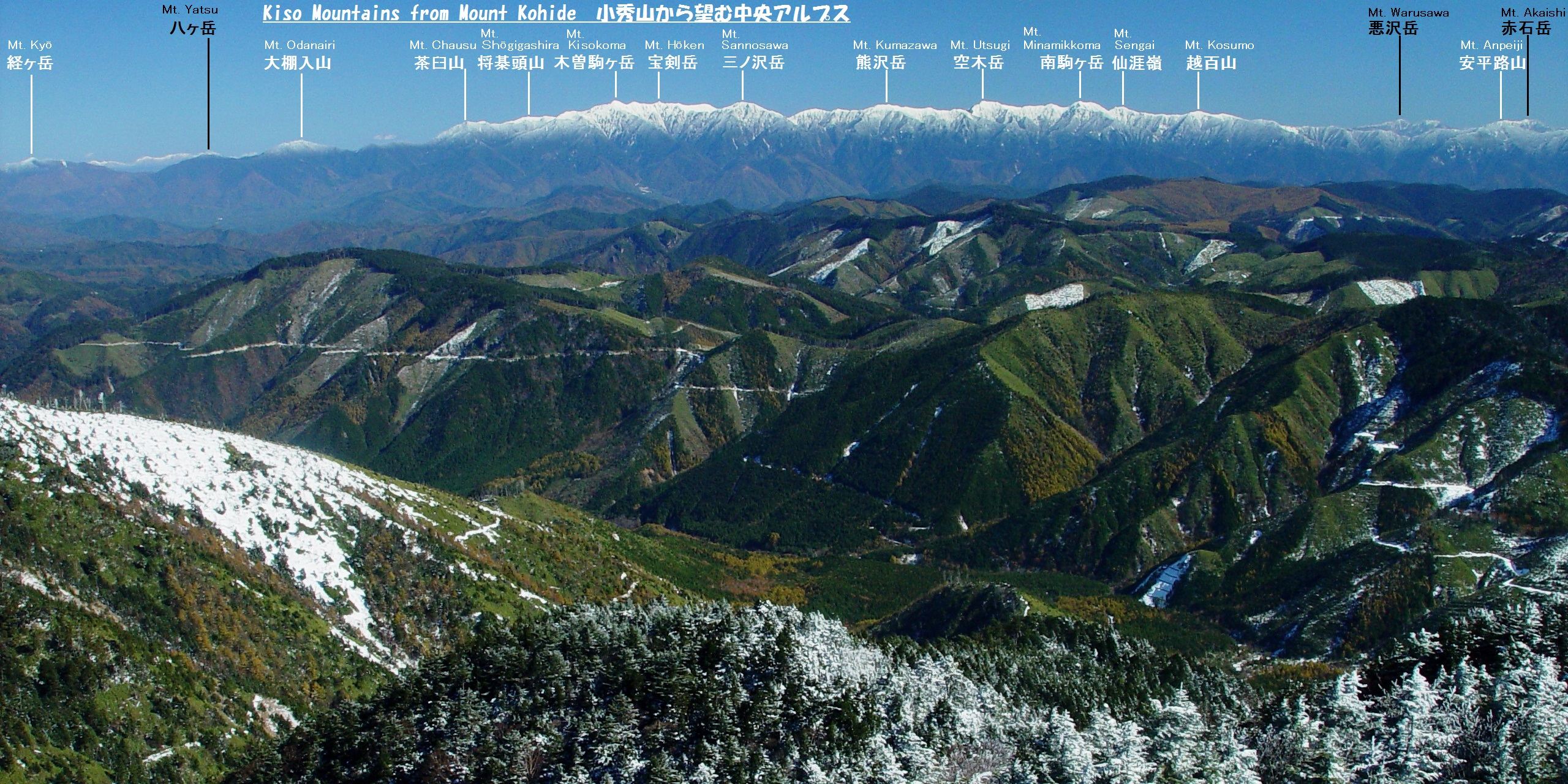
Kiso Mountains seen from west (Mount Kohide)

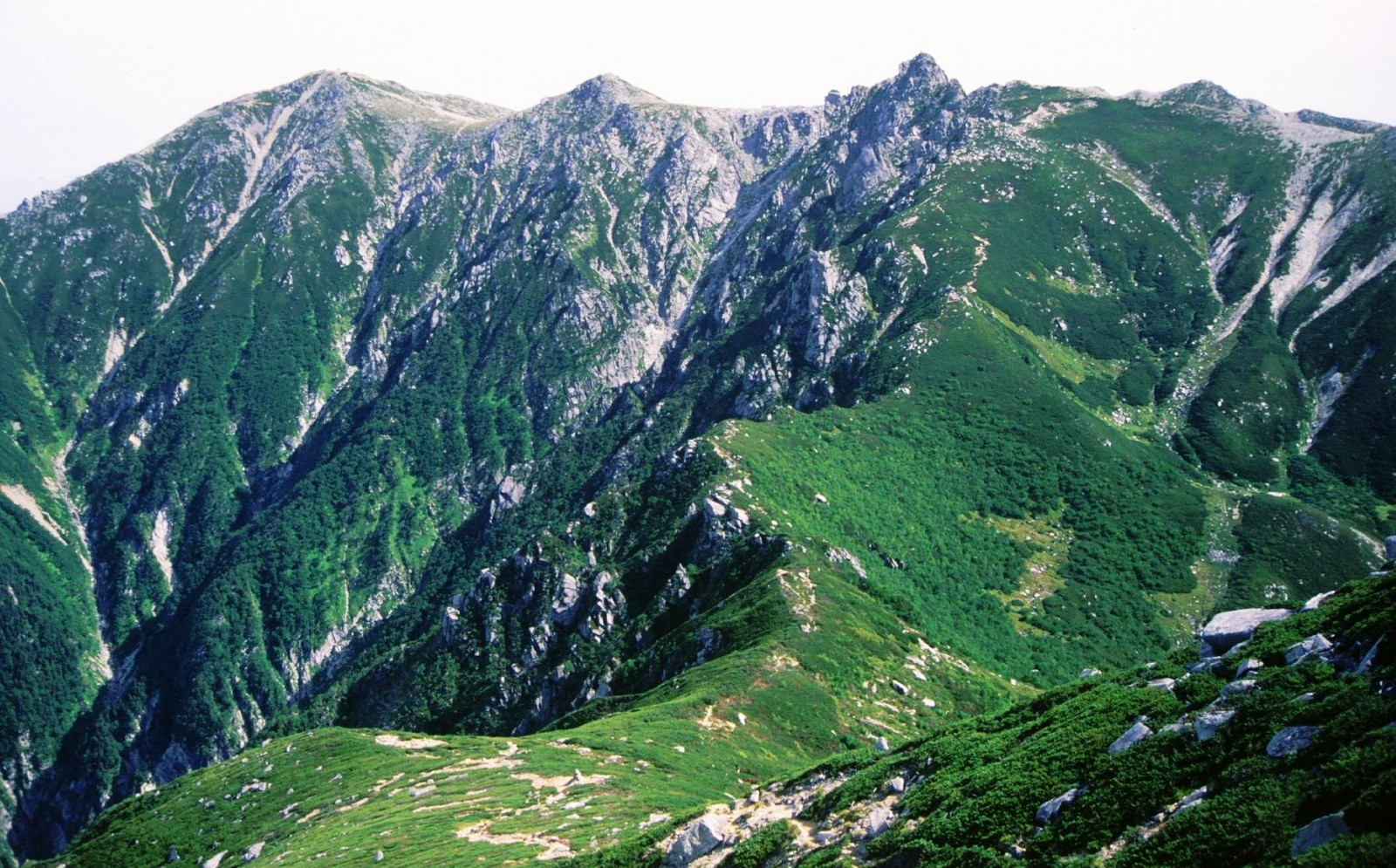
Mt. Kisokoma and Mt. Hōken seen from Mount Sannosawa

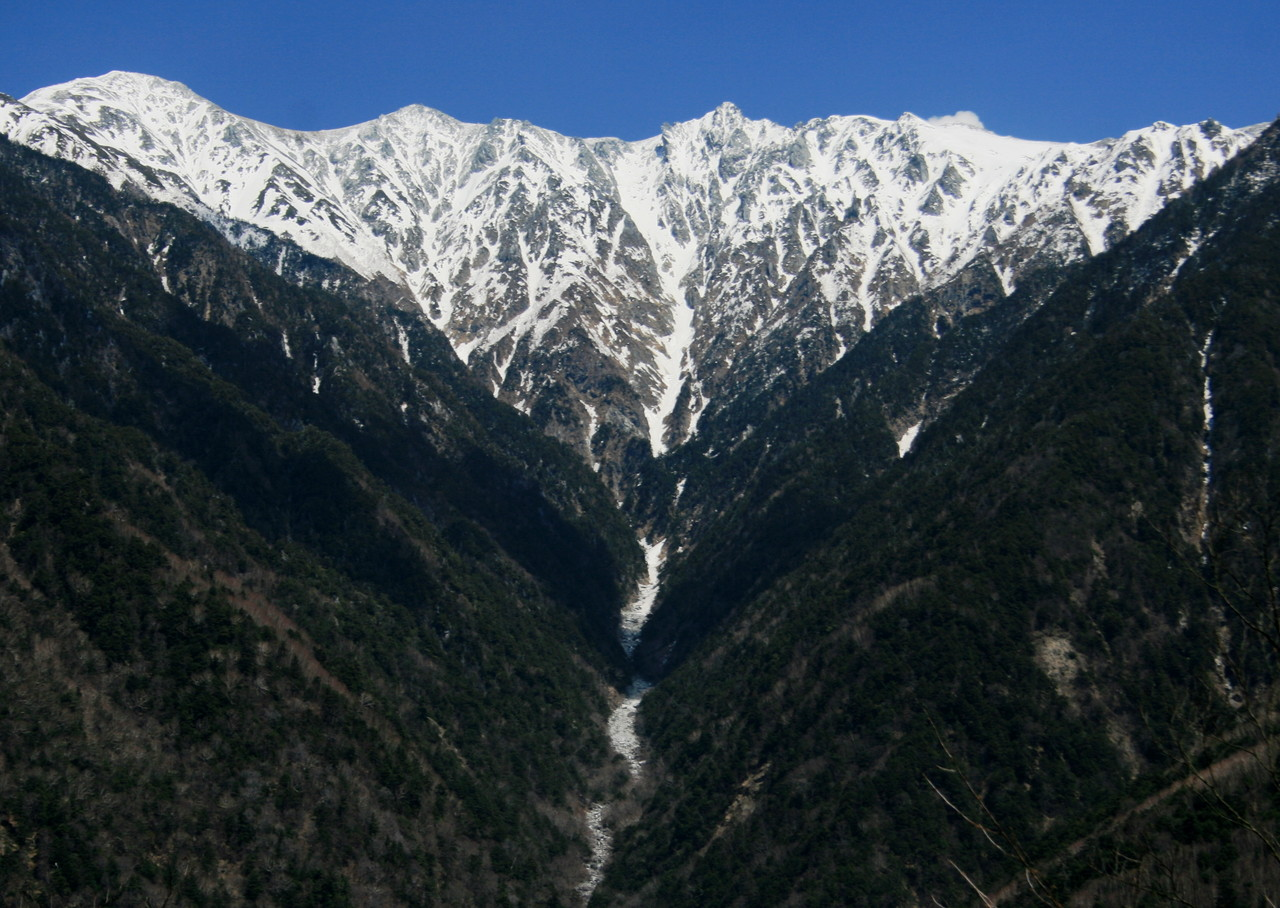
Mt. Kisokoma and Mt. Hōken seen from Mount Kazakoshi

== See also ==
- Japanese Alps
  - Hida Mountains (Northern Alps)
  - Akaishi Mountains (Southern Alps)
- List of mountains in Japan
