= Mount Utsugi =

Mountain in Chūbu region, Japan

- 空木岳
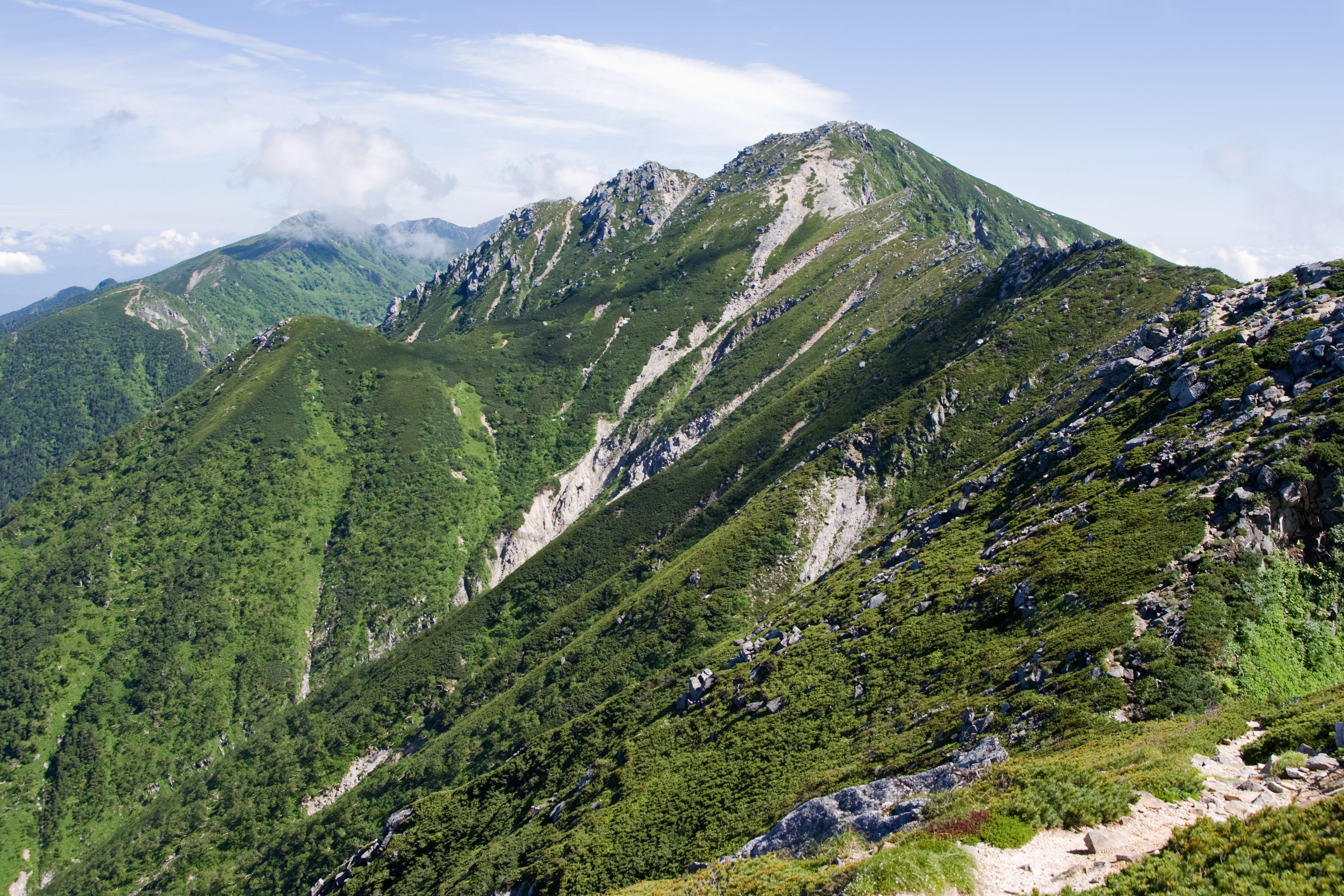
- Mount Utsugi from Mount Akanigi

Highest point
- Elevation: 2,864 m (9,396 ft)
- Listing: Mountains of Japan
- Coordinates: 35°43′08″N 137°49′01″E

Geography
- Location within Japan
- Location: Kiso District and Kamiina District, Nagano Prefecture, Japan
- Parent range: Kiso Mountains

Mount Utsugi (空木岳, Utsugi-dake) is a mountain located on the boundary of Okuwa, Iijima and Miyada, Nagano Prefecture, in the Chūbu region of Japan. It is 2,864 m (9,396 ft) tall and part of the Kiso Mountains. It is also included on the list of "100 Famous Japanese Mountains."

== Hiking ==
The landscape of Mt. Utsugi includes large granite boulders surrounded by lush greenery. Due to its distance and elevation gain it is usually completed as an overnight hike. The trail begins in the town of Komagane which is also popular for its onsen and the Komagatake Ropeway.

== Gallery ==
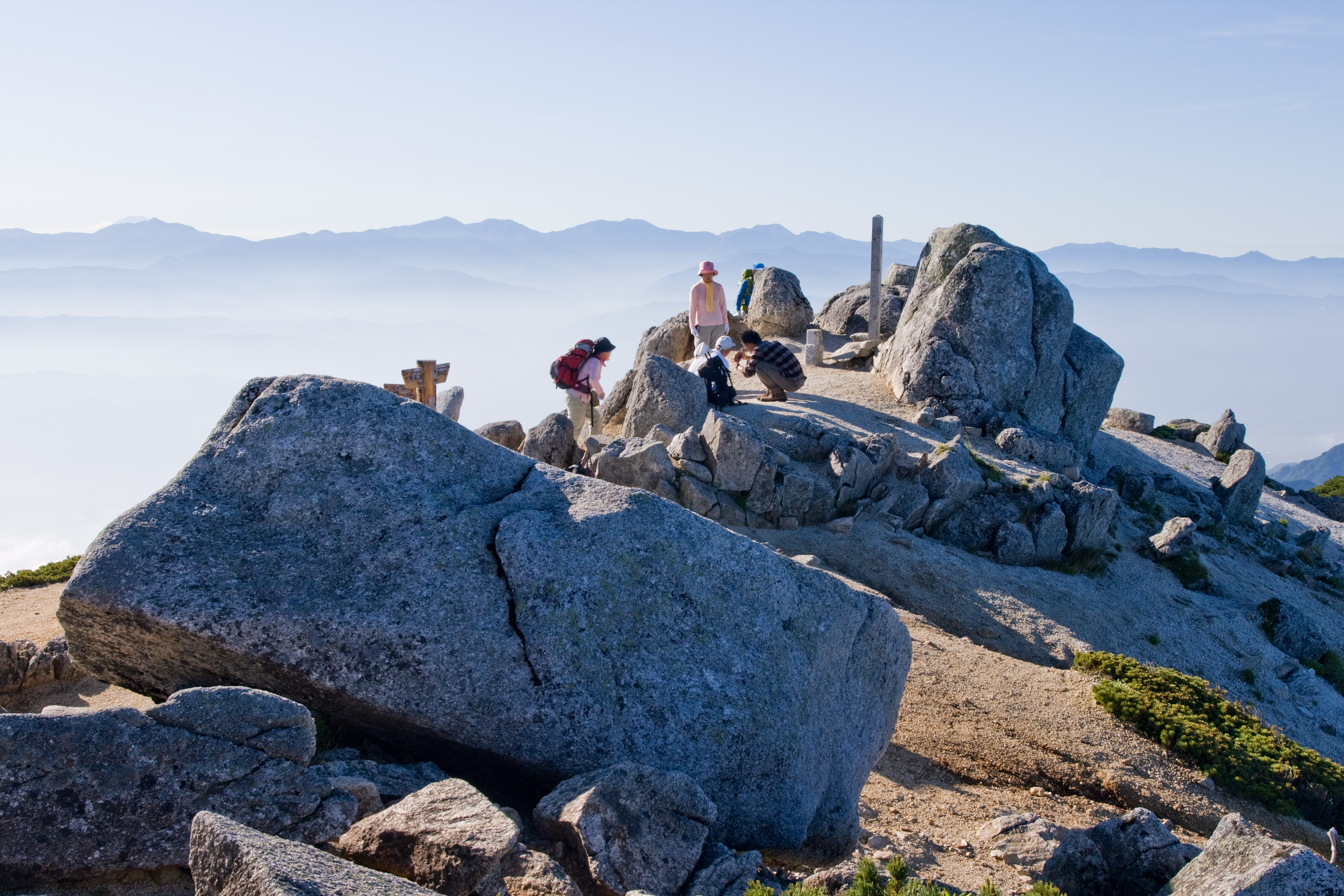
The summit of Mount Utsugi.

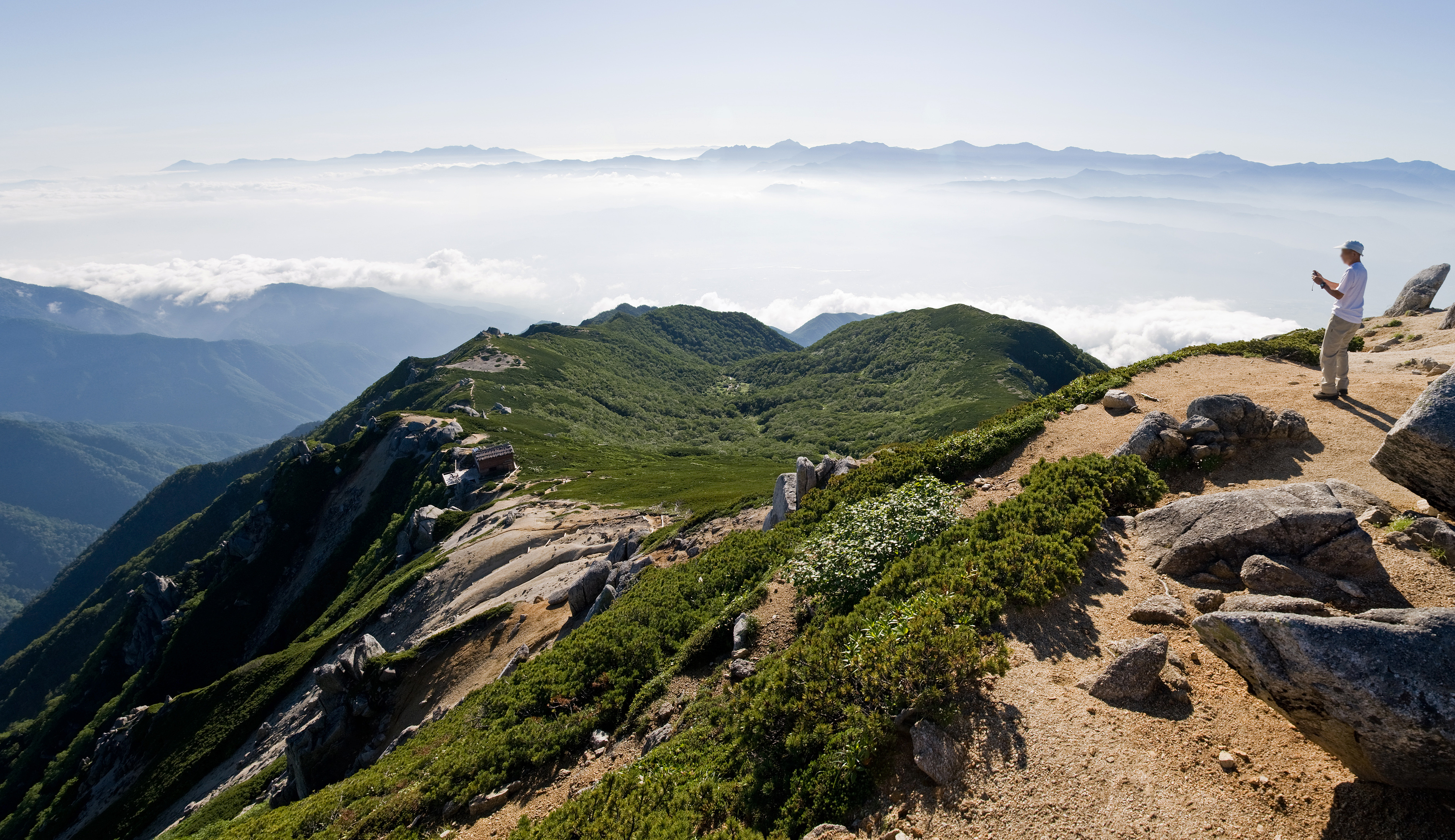
The view from the summit.
