= Jean-Marc Boivin =

French extreme sports athlete

Boivin, with trademark headband, on the cover of Jean-Marc Boivin: Extrêmement vôtre DVD

Jean-Marc Boivin (6 April 1951 – 17 February 1990) was a French mountaineer, extreme skier, hang glider and paraglider pilot, speleologist, BASE jumper, film maker and author. The holder of several altitude records for hang gliding and paragliding, the creator of numerous first ascents and first ski descents in the Alps, a member of the team that broke the record for a sub-glacial dive and the first person to paraglide from the summit of Mount Everest, Boivin was a pioneer of extreme sports. He died from injuries incurred after BASE jumping off Angel Falls in Venezuela, the highest waterfall in the world.

== Early life ==
Boivin was born in Dijon in 1951. He went to secondary school in Dijon, Belfort and Tournus, and gained his Baccalauréat de technicien in 1971. Between 1972 and 1973 he studied mechanical manufacturing in Sens. It was while working at the Peugeot factory in Dijon that he decided to live "in" and "for" the mountains. Coming to both climbing and skiing quite late in his childhood at the age of 14, he climbed on the cliffs of Cormot, in the cirque du Bout du Monde near Nolay, as well as in Brochon, Fixin and Saffres, and skied in the Jura mountains. By 1972 he was sufficiently proficient at skiing to come fourth in the Série Nationale. He gained his aspirant guide diploma from l'Ecole Nationale de Ski et d'Alpinisme de Chamonix in 1973, the same year that he completed his military service with the 159th Regiment of Alpine Infantry in Briançon, section Eclaireurs en Montagne. From this point, Boivin dedicated himself to being what he called "an all-round professional adventurer".

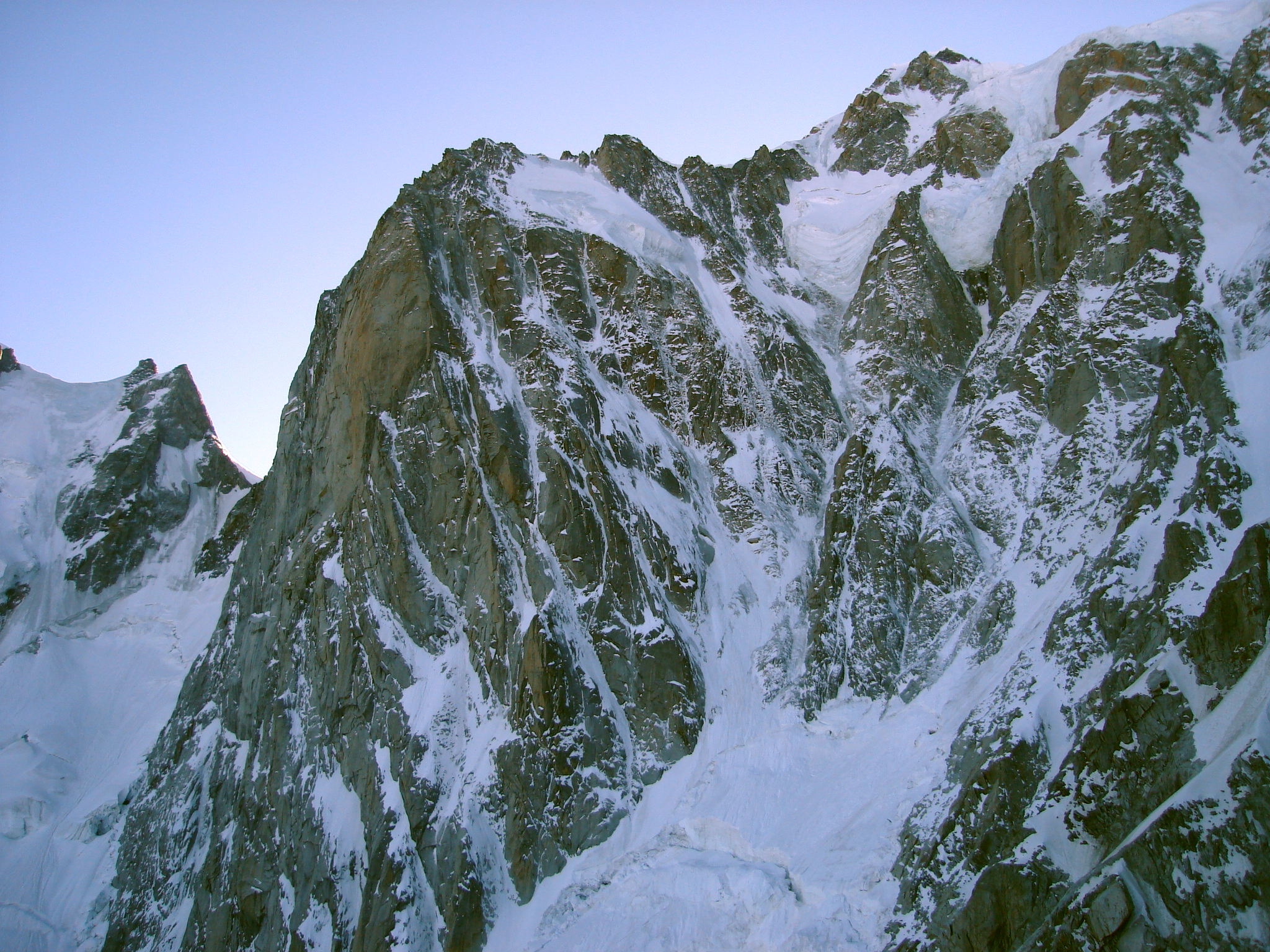
The Grand Pilier d'Angle. In 1975 Boivin and Patrick Vallençant added a direct finish to the classic Cecchinel-Nominé route. In 1978 Boivin soloed the Bonatti-Zapelli route, which takes the centre of the face.

== Extreme sports ==
=== Alpinism ===
Boivin was one of the leading alpinists of his era, making solo ascents of some of the hardest routes in the Alps during the 1970s: the Albinoni-Gabarrou goulotte on Mont Blanc du Tacul in 1972, the Lagarde-Ségogne on the Aiguille du Plan in 1976 and the Bonatti-Zapelli on the Grand Pilier d'Angle in 1978. In 1975, Boivin and Gabarrou made first ascents of the direct north faces of Les Droites and the Aiguille Verte, followed by the Supercouloir on Mont Blanc du Tacul, and came to be seen as "the young new wave of the moment". On 31 July 1983 Boivin soloed the north face of the Eiger in 7 1/2 hours, finishing the climb via the Harlin Direttissima.

He is well known for being one of the leading practitioners of the concept of enchaînement, in which several difficult climbs are undertaken in one outing (with descents often being made by hang glider, paraglider or ski). On 14 August 1981, together with Patrick Berhault, he climbed the south face of the Aiguille du Fou and the American Direct on the Aiguille du Dru, flying to the Dru from the summit of the Aiguille de Blaitière by hang glider. On 20 February 1985 he made the first winter solo ascent of the Bettembourg-Thivierge on the Aiguille Verte, descending the Whymper Couloir by ski. On 14 March 1985, he climbed the Albinoni-Gabarrou on Mont Blanc du Tacul, then made the first ski descent of the south face of Mont Blanc du Tacul, then climbed the Kuffner arėte on Mont Maudit and made the first ski descent of the Kuffner, returning to Italy via the Androsace couloir. On 17 March 1986, using skis, paraglider and hang glider, he linked up ascents of the north faces ("les 4 Glorieuses") of the Aiguille Verte (first winter solo of the Grassi route), Les Droites (via the Corneau-Davaille, ending via the Boivin-Gabarrou), Les Courtes (Swiss route) and the Grandes Jorasses (The Shroud), flying 15 km (9.3 mi) back to the Chamonix valley after his final ascent and arriving at 0:30 am.

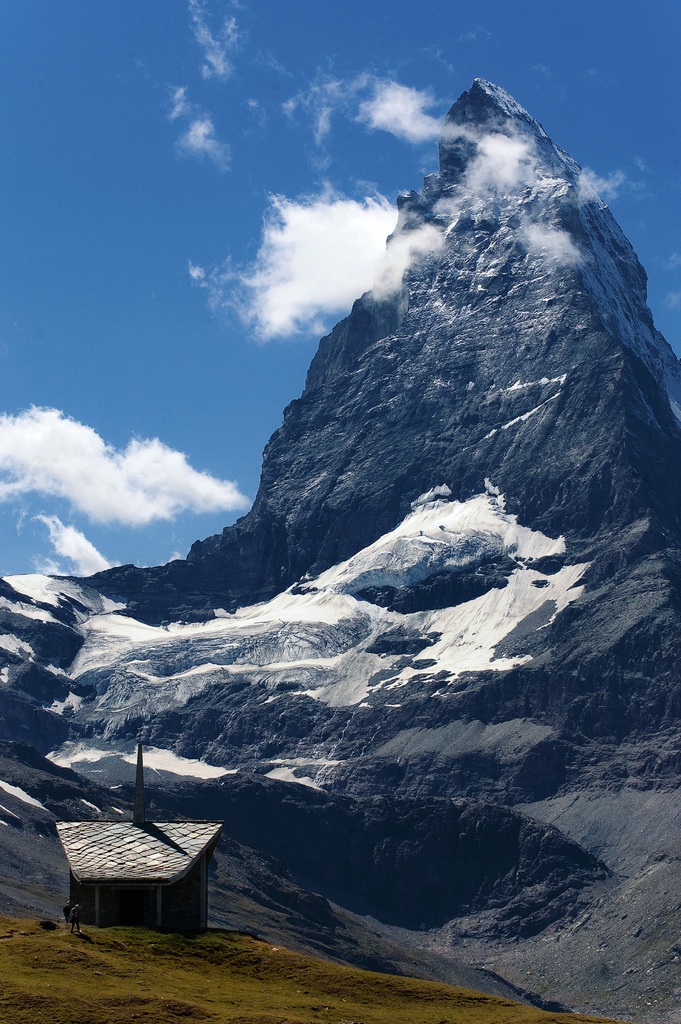
The east face of the Matterhorn. Boivin made the first ski descent of the face in 1980, from the Shoulder.

=== Extreme skiing ===
Boivin made the first ski descents of the following mountains and faces, amongst others: the Frendo Spur on the Aiguille du Midi on 2 July 1977; the south face of Huascarán and the north faces of Pisco and Kitarahu (all in the Andes) in 1978; the east face of the Matterhorn, on which he skied slopes of more than 60 degrees (from the Shoulder, after which he soloed the Schmid route on the north face in 4 hours 10 minutes) on 6 June 1980; Y-shaped Gully on the Aiguille Verte on 26 February 1985; Nant Blanc face of the Aiguille Verte on 12 June 1989. On 17 April 1987 he made a ski enchaînement of five descents: south-east face of the Aiguille du Moine (1st descent); south face of the Aiguille du Dru (1st descent); Whymper Couloir on the Aiguille Verte; north-east face of Les Courtes; finishing off with a descent of the Grandes Jorasses.

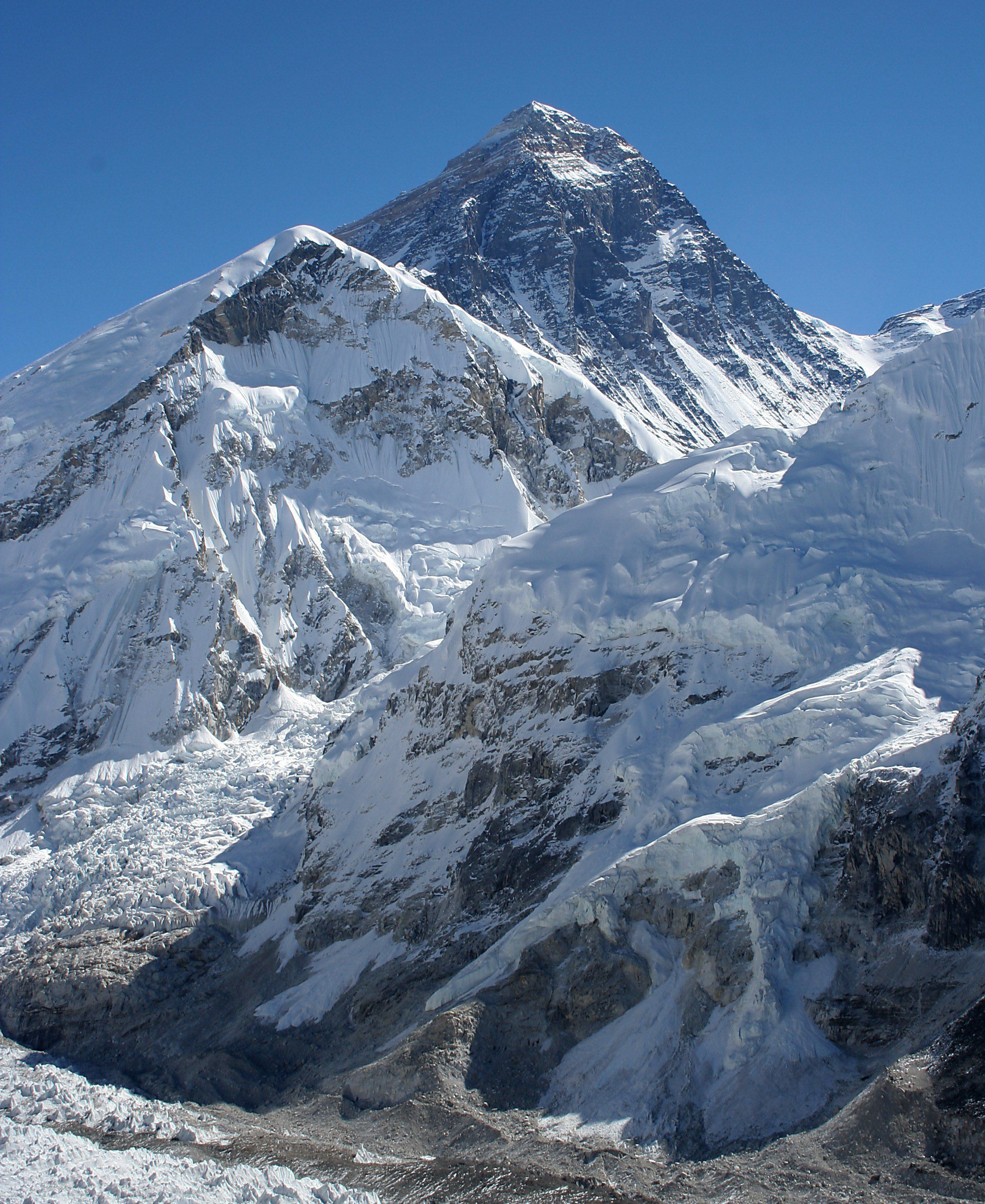
Boivin set several records on Mount Everest in 1988: highest paraglider flight, first paraglider descent and fastest descent of the mountain.

Boivin made a number of films of his ski descents, stunning people who had never seen such extreme descents before. One person who saw footage of Boivin at the Telluride Film Festival said:

"My hands broke a sweat as I watched Boivin. He'd make a turn, then slide for 40 feet with his skis shaking and uphill hand dragging on the snow, finally gaining enough control to make another 'turn'. It was an awesome display and made us realize just what could be done using skis as a tool of alpinism."

—

=== Hang gliding and paragliding ===
In 1979, Boivin set an altitude record for a hang glider, launching from Camp IV on K2 at an altitude of 7,600 m (24,900 ft) after making an ascent of the peak. Two years later, in 1981, he set an altitude record together with Dominique Marchal for a two-man hang glider by launching from the summit of Aconcagua (7,021 m (23,035 ft)).

On 14 July 1985, Boivin again broke the altitude record for a hang glider by launching from the summit of Gasherbrum II (he had reached the 8,035 m (26,362 ft) summit the week before, on 8 July, and reclimbed the mountain to make his jump). On 26 September 1988, having climbed the mountain via the south-east ridge, Boivin made the first paraglider descent of Mount Everest, in the process creating the record for the fastest descent of the mountain and the highest paraglider flight. Boivin said: "I was tired when I reached the top because I had broken much of the trail, and to run at this altitude was quite hard." Boivin ran 60 ft (18 m) from below the summit on 40-degree slopes to launch his paraglider, reaching Camp II at 19,400 ft (5,900 m) in 12 minutes (some sources say 11 minutes).

On 14 April 1988, he broke the record for distance travelled by paraglider, flying 31.5 km (19.6 mi) from Mont Maudit in the Mont Blanc massif, arriving at Orsière having flown over the Aiguille Verte, the Aiguille du Tour and Pointe d'Orny.

=== Speleology ===
On 6–7 November 1986, together with a team of speleologists, Boivin set a world record for a subglacial dive. They dived to a depth of 117 m under the Mer de Glace in their exploration of the Grand Moulin de la Mer de Glace.

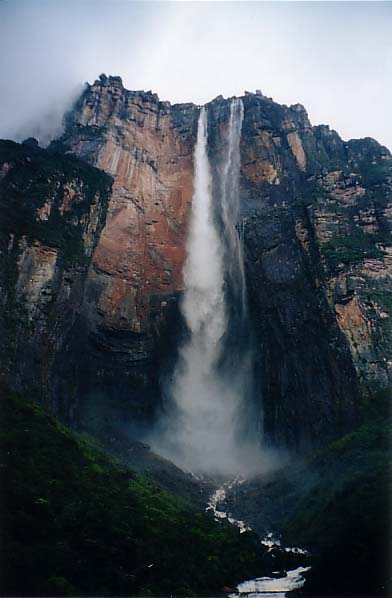
Angel Falls, where Boivin died in 1990

== Death ==
On 16 February 1990, while being filmed by a TV crew for the French programme Ushuaïa, le magazine de l'extrême, Boivin made a c. 1,000 m (3,300 ft) BASE jump down Angel Falls in Venezuela, the highest waterfall in the world. This was a jump from the highest point of the falls. The following day he decided to repeat the jump. Just before he leapt off, a woman named "Catherine" jumped and was injured at the foot of the falls. Boivin decided to make his jump immediately afterwards, carrying help for the injured woman. According to one account, on his descent he hit a tree and was seriously injured with multiple fractures. He told the helicopter team that came to rescue him to attend to the injured woman first. Another witness account maintains that Boivin hit the cliff, landed in the tree-tops, and that the helicopter team thought that his waving was a sign that he was not injured, rather than an attempt to summon help. Both accounts agree that when the team returned for him, he had died from internal injuries and blood loss.

== Films ==
=== By Boivin ===
- Glace Extrême, 1977, 36 min (director and producer). Award: Mario Belo prize at the Trento International Mountain Film Festival
- Au Vent des Cimes, 1978, 36 min (director and producer)
- Aventure au Cervin, 1980, 56 min (director). Produced by the Société Française de Production and Antenne 2. Awards: Grand Prix at the Trento International Mountain Film Festival, the San Sebastián International Mountain Film Festival, the Cortina d'Ampezzo International Mountain Film Festival (all in 1981); "Prix du Meilleur Film de Montagne" at the Tourcoing Festival, 1983
- Aventure à l'Aconcagua, 1981, 56 min (co-director). Produced by the Société Française de Production and Antenne 2
- Aratitiyopé, 1984, 26 min (co-director). Produced by Antenne 2 and Riviera Films. Award: Prix Feuille de Hêtre at the San Sebastian International Mountain Film Festival, 1985
- L'Oiseau Rare, 1985, 26 min (co-writer). Produced by Antenne 2 and MC4
- Descente, 1987, 26 min (co-writer with Jean Afanasieff). Produced by FR3 Rhône-Alpes and MC4
- Vents Contraires, 1988 (writer and director). Produced by TF1, FR3 Rhône-Alpes and MC4

=== About Boivin ===
- Everest 88, 1988 (directed by Jean Afanasieff). Produced by FR3
- Inlandsis, 1989, 26 min. Award: Prix "Ville de Paris" at the Festival de l'Aventure de Paris, 1990
- Jean-Marc Boivin: Extrêmement vôtre, 2007, 52 min (directed by Gilles Chappaz). Produced by FR3 Bourgogne Franche-Comté

== Books by Boivin ==
- Trois défis au Cervin (with Guy Geoffroy), Editions Glénat/Aventures Extraordinaires, 1981
- L'abominable homme des glaces, Editions Flammarion, 1983
- L'Aventure jusqu'au bout (with F. Boivin and J. M. Parte), Meylan, 1991

== Awards ==
- International Award for Valour in Sport, London, 5 February 1980 (awarded for Boivin's hang glider flight from a height of 7,600 m (24,900 ft) off K2)

== Commemoration ==
- Lycée Jean-Marc Boivin in Chevigny-Saint-Sauveur, opened on 5 October 1990
- Complexe Sportif Jean-Marc Boivin in Nolay
- Salle Jean-Marc Boivin in the Club alpin français building in Dijon
- Jean-Marc Boivin footpath in Nolay (45 km (28 mi) long with 1,500 m (4,900 ft) of ascent and descent)
- Jean-Marc Boivin award at the Dijon International Adventure Film Festival. This annual award, presented by his widow Françoise Boivin, is given "for the authenticity of an adventure".
