= Pointe des Ecandies =

Mountain in Switzerland

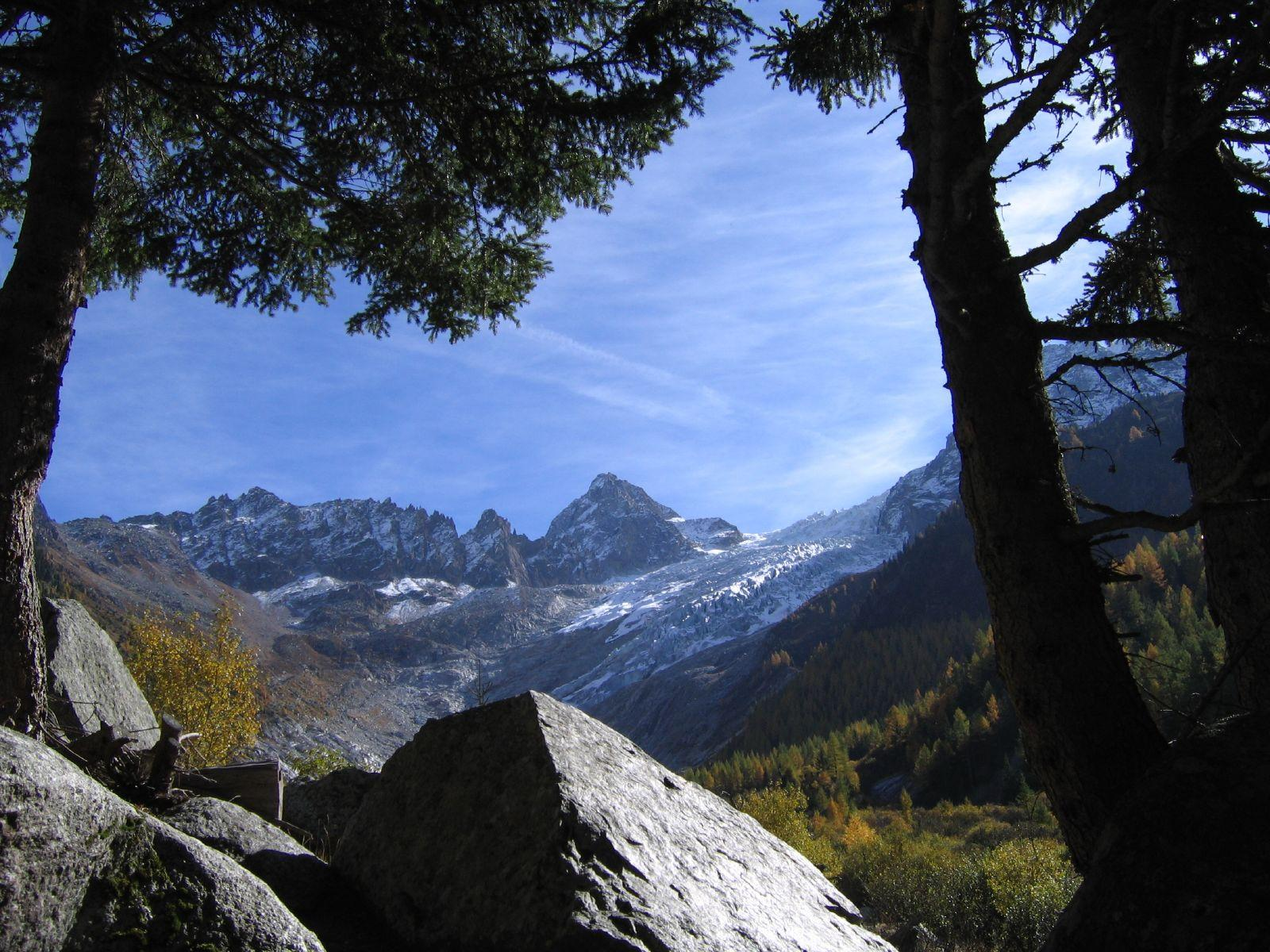
- Pointe des Ecandies (left summit) and Petite Pointe d'Orny (central summit)

Highest point
- Elevation: 2,873 m (9,426 ft)
- Prominence: 90 m (300 ft)
- Coordinates: 46°00′54.4″N 7°02′22.1″E

Geography
- Location within Switzerland
- Location: Valais, Switzerland
- Parent range: Mont Blanc Massif

The Pointe des Ecandies is a mountain of the Mont Blanc Massif, located between Trient and Champex in the canton of Valais. It is located north of the Pointe d'Orny and east of the Trient Glacier.
