= Cirque du Bout du Monde =

Cirque du Bout du Monde may refer to:

== In Europe ==
=== In France ===
- Cirque du Bout du Monde (Côte d'Or) in Burgundy
- Cirque du Bout du Monde (Herault) in Languedoc
