= Petite Pointe d'Orny =

Mountain in Switzerland

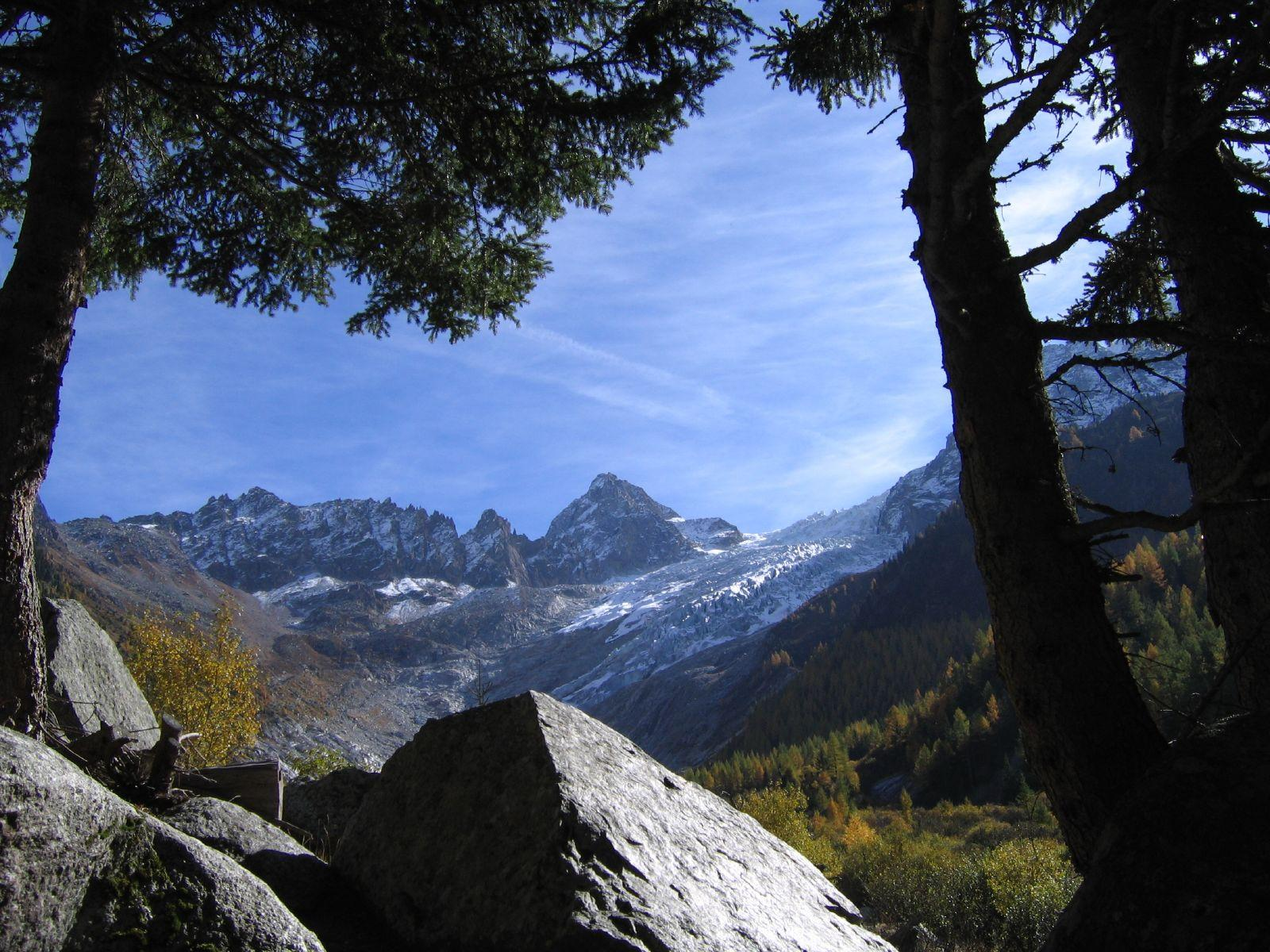
- Petite Pointe d'Orny (center)

Highest point
- Elevation: 3,187 m (10,456 ft)
- Prominence: 42 m (138 ft)
- Parent peak: Pointe d'Orny
- Coordinates: 46°00′22″N 7°02′15″E

Geography
- Location within Switzerland
- Location: Switzerland
- Parent range: Mont Blanc Massif

The Petite Pointe d'Orny is a mountain of the Mont Blanc Massif, overlooking the Trient Glacier in the canton of Valais. It lies north of the Pointe d'Orny.
