= Vauchignon =

Commune in Côte-d'Or, France

- Part of Cormot-Vauchignon
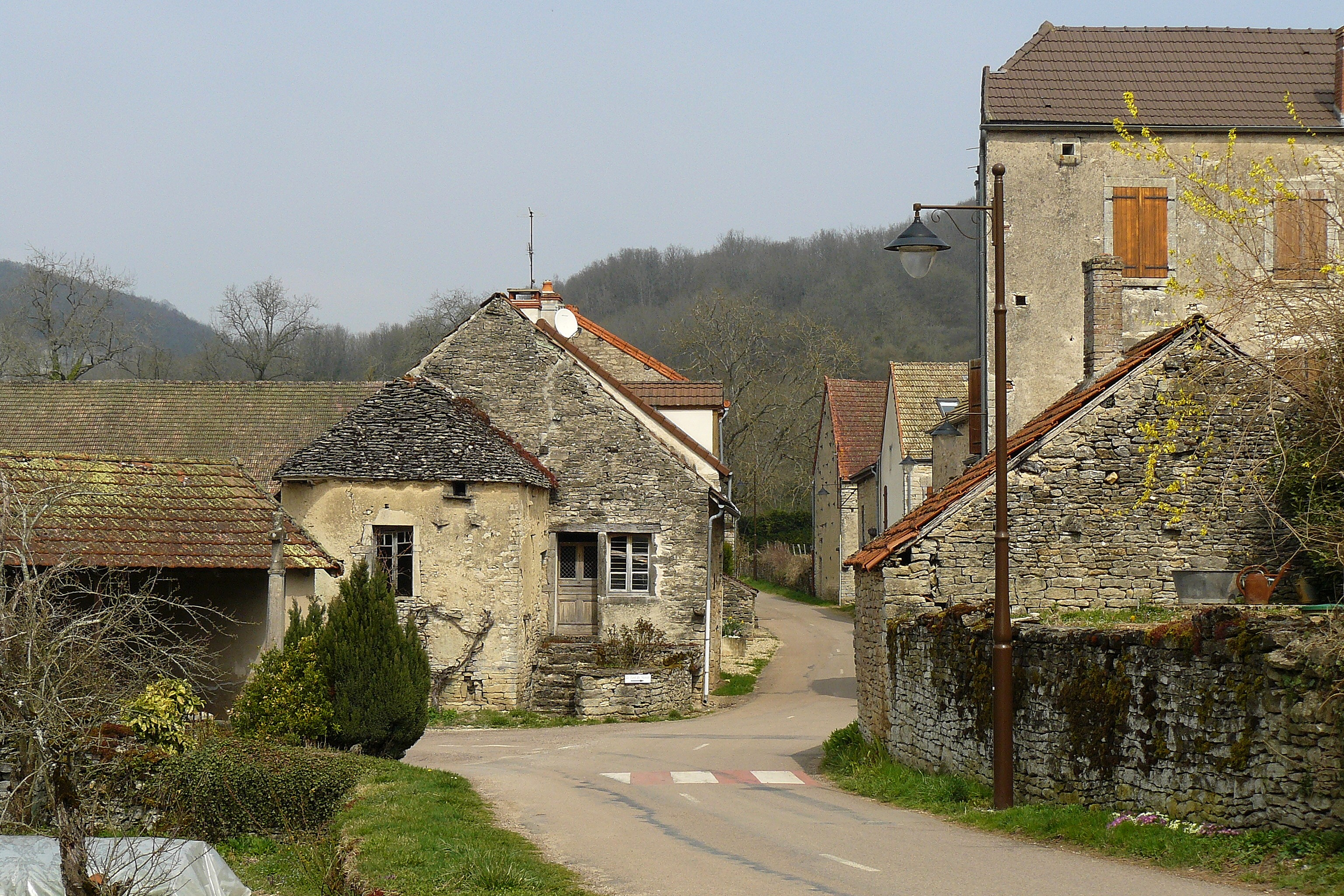
- Location of Vauchignon
- Location within France Location within Bourgogne-Franche-Comté
- Coordinates: 46°58′37″N 4°38′42″E
- Country: France
- Region: Bourgogne-Franche-Comté
- Department: Côte-d'Or
- Arrondissement: Beaune
- Canton: Arnay-le-Duc
- Commune: Cormot-Vauchignon
- Area^{1}: 4.24 km^{2} (1.64 sq mi)
- Highest elevation: 567 m (1,860 ft)
- Lowest elevation: 367 m (1,204 ft)
- Population (2014): 44
  - Density: 10/km^{2} (27/sq mi)
- Time zone: UTC+01:00 (CET)
  - Summer (DST): UTC+02:00 (CEST)
- Postal code: 21340
- ^{1} French Land Register data, which excludes lakes, ponds, glaciers > 1 km^{2} (0.386 sq mi or 247 acres) and river estuaries.

Vauchignon (French pronunciation: [voʃiɲɔ̃]) is a former commune in the Côte-d'Or department in eastern France. On 1 January 2017, it was merged into the new commune Cormot-Vauchignon.

== See also ==
- Communes of the Côte-d'Or department
