= Yamasaki Cirque =

Coordinates: 36°34′34″N 137°36′58″E

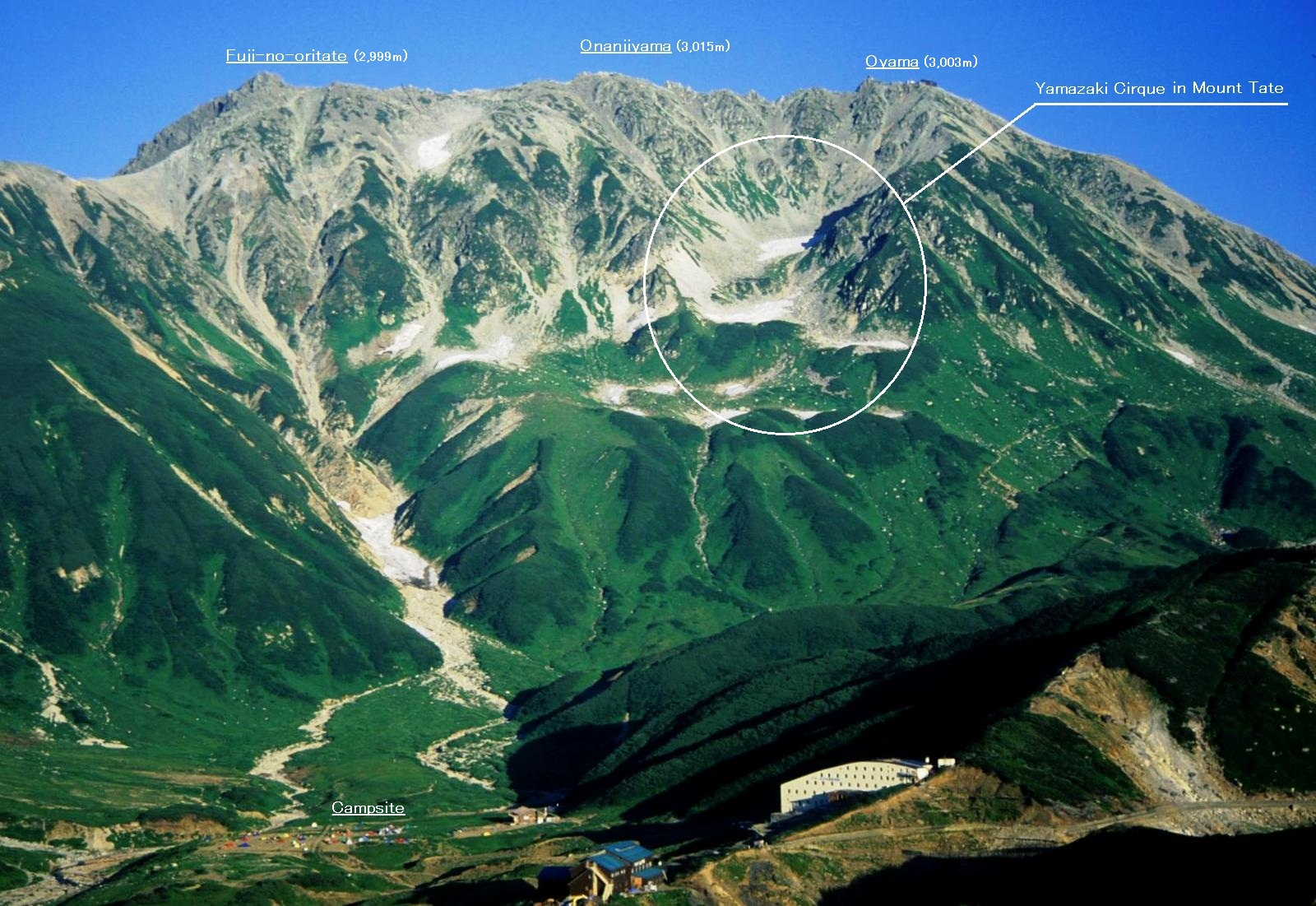
Mount Tateyama and Yamasaki Cirque

Yamasaki Cirque is a cirque located on the North-West side of Oyama peak of Mount Tateyama, Hida Mountains, Japan.

== Outlines ==
It is 400 metres wide, and its length is 600 m. It is one of the first cirques discovered in Japan by geographer Naomasa Yamasaki (1870–1929), in 1905. It was named after Yamasaki in 1942. In 1945, it was assigned as natural monument by national government as "Yamasaki Cirque of Tateyama". Geologist Saburo Fukai found three moraines in the cirque. It is prohibited to go inside the cirque, but it can observed from Enmadai Platform in the north of Mikurigaike Pond.

== See also ==
- Naomasa Yamasaki
- Mount Tate
- Cirque
- Karasawa Cirque
- Senjōjiki Cirque
