= Cormot-Vauchignon =

- Commune
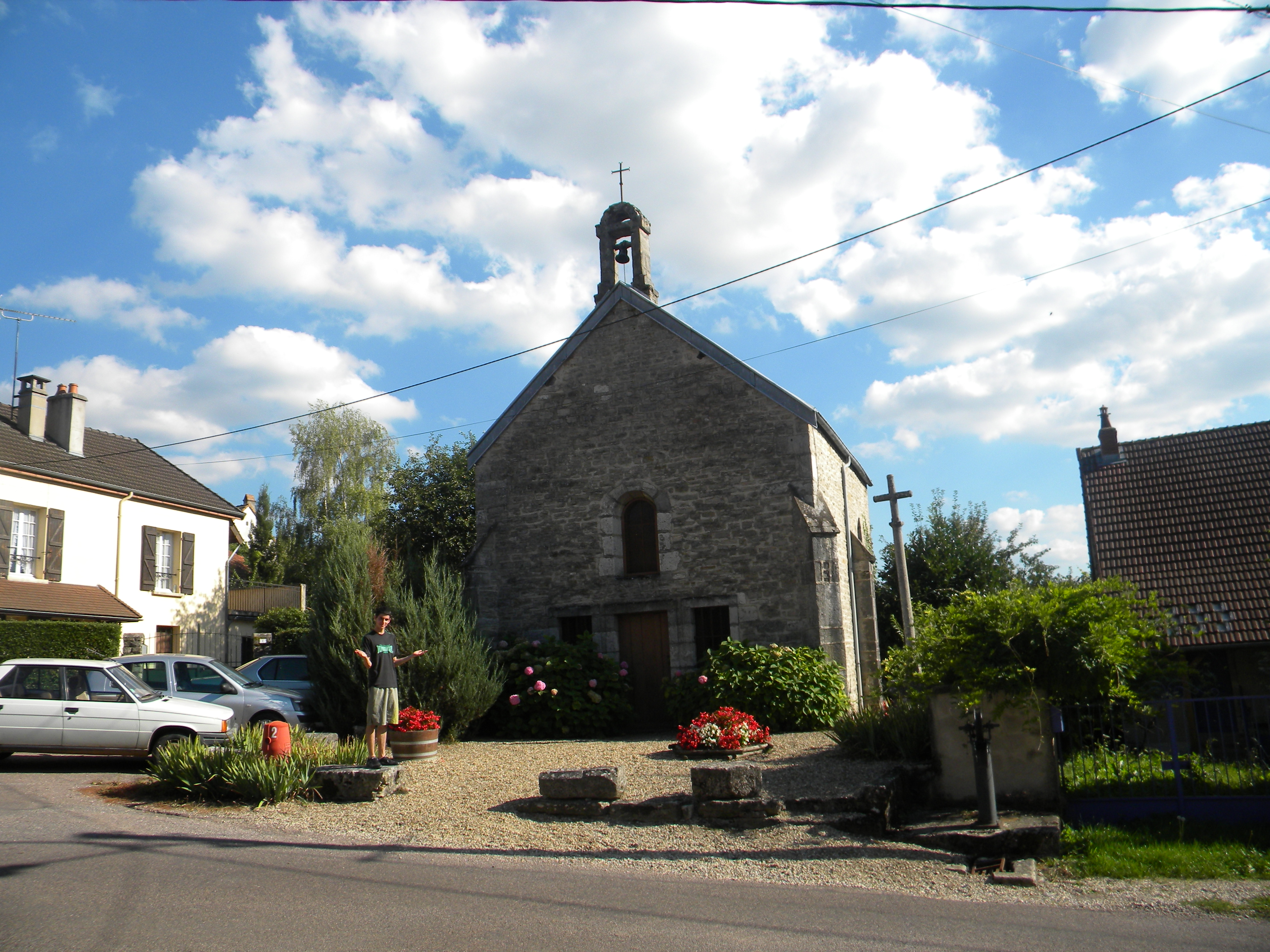
- The church in Cormot-le-Grand
- Location of Cormot-Vauchignon
- Location within France Location within Bourgogne-Franche-Comté
- Coordinates: 46°57′47″N 4°38′38″E
- Country: France
- Region: Bourgogne-Franche-Comté
- Department: Côte-d'Or
- Arrondissement: Beaune
- Canton: Arnay-le-Duc
- Intercommunality: CA Beaune Côte et Sud

Government
  - Mayor (2020–2026): Marc Denizot
- Area^{1}: 10.12 km^{2} (3.91 sq mi)
- Population (2023): 210
  - Density: 21/km^{2} (54/sq mi)
- Time zone: UTC+01:00 (CET)
  - Summer (DST): UTC+02:00 (CEST)
- INSEE/Postal code: 21195 /21340
- ^{1} French Land Register data, which excludes lakes, ponds, glaciers > 1 km^{2} (0.386 sq mi or 247 acres) and river estuaries.

Cormot-Vauchignon (French pronunciation: [kɔʁmo voʃiɲɔ̃]) is a commune in the department of Côte-d'Or, eastern France. The municipality was established on 1 January 2017 by merger of the former communes of Cormot-le-Grand (the seat) and Vauchignon.

== See also ==
- Communes of the Côte-d'Or department
