= Naomasa Yamasaki =

Japanese geographer (1870–1929)

Naomasa Yamasaki (山崎 直方, Yamasaki Naomasa; March 10, 1870 – July 26, 1929) was a Japanese geographer and regarded as the father of modern Japanese geography.

He was a professor at Tokyo Imperial University from 1911 to 1929, where he created the department of geography and founded The Association of Japanese Geographers. The latter is the primary academic geographic society in Japan.

== Books ==
- 地理学教科書(Chirigaku Kyokasyo)1900
- 大日本地誌(Dainihon Chishi)1903-1915
- 我が南洋(Waga nanyo)1916

== Articles ==
- 氷河果して本邦に存在せざりしか(Hyoga hatashite hompo ni sonzaisezarishika)1902

== See also ==
- Bunjirō Kotō
- Yamasaki Cirque
