= Cirque du Bout du Monde (Côte d'Or) =

Steephead valley and cirque in France

Coordinates: 46°59′02″N 4°38′55″E

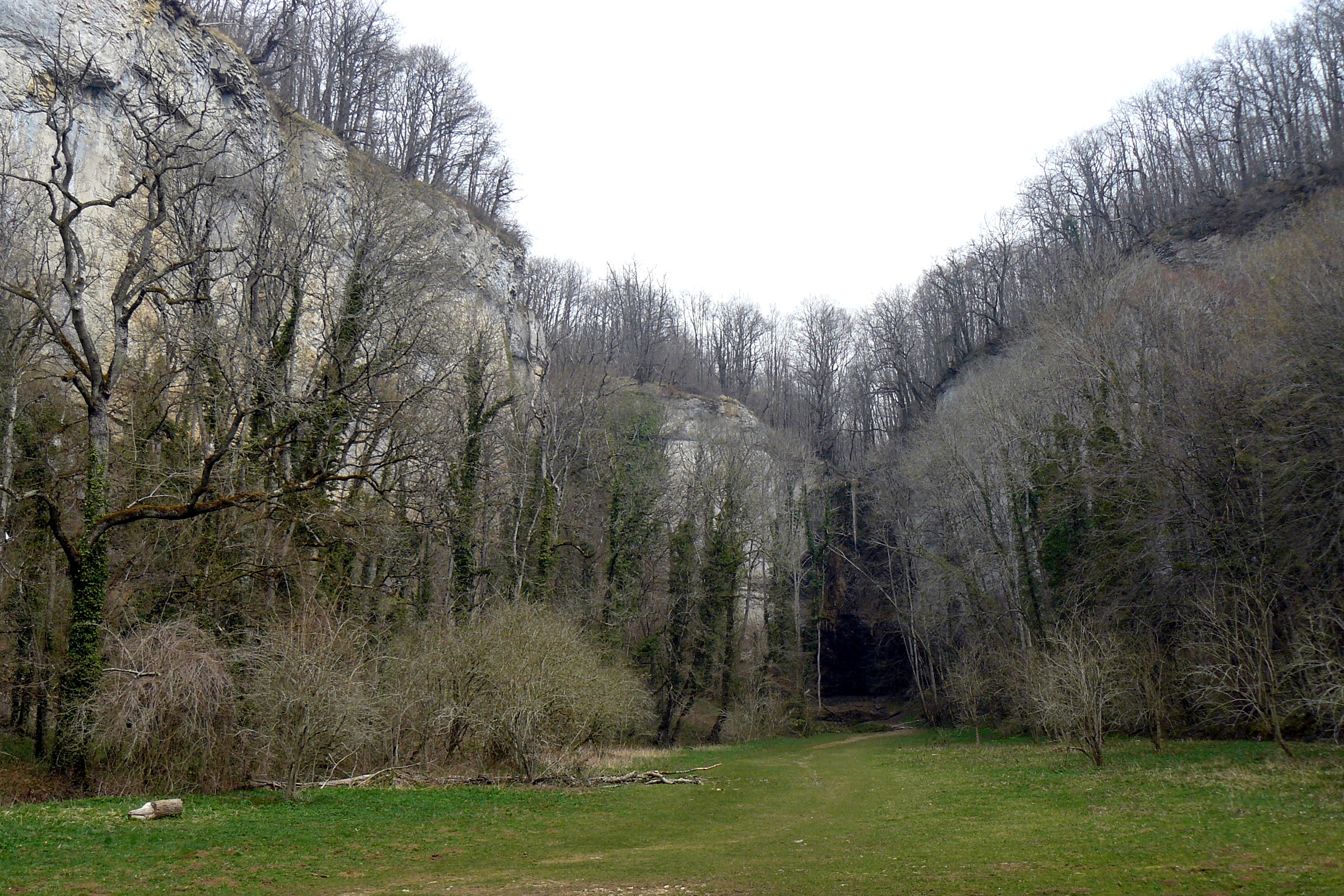
The Cirque du Bout du Monde in early Spring.

The Cirque du Bout du Monde (English: Cirque at the Edge of the World) is a steephead valley and cirque in Burgundy, in the département of Côte-d'Or near the vineyards of Beaune.

It is the sole costalorian steephead valley. Major features of the valley are a 40 metres (130 ft) waterfall and several caves.
