= Saint-Étienne-de-Gourgas =

- Commune
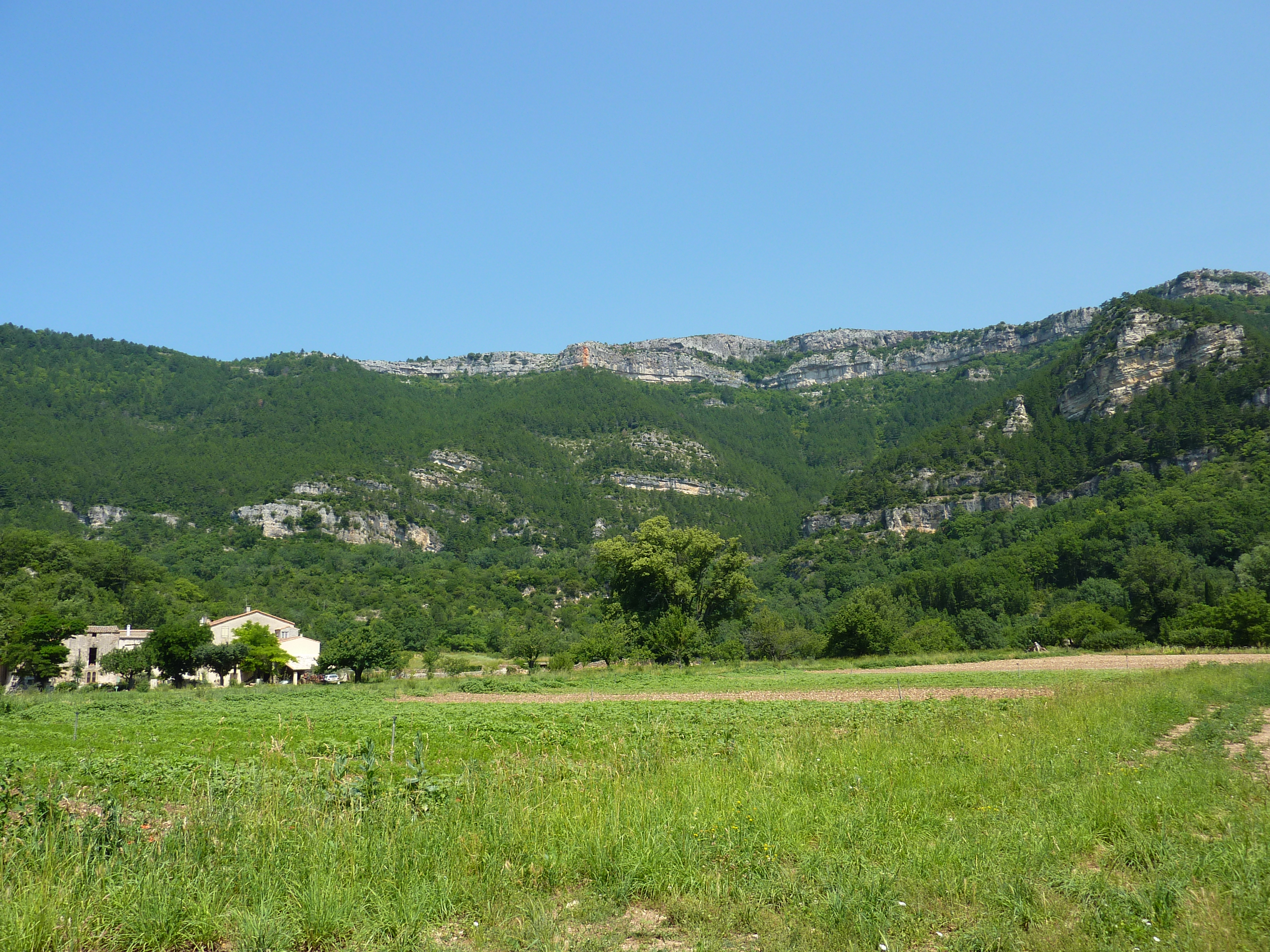
- Cirque du Bout du Monde
- Location of Saint-Étienne-de-Gourgas
- Location within France Location within Occitanie
- Coordinates: 43°46′14″N 3°22′42″E
- Country: France
- Region: Occitania
- Department: Hérault
- Arrondissement: Lodève
- Canton: Lodève
- Intercommunality: Lodévois-Larzac

Government
  - Mayor (2020–2026): Jean-Luc Requi
- Area^{1}: 19.43 km^{2} (7.50 sq mi)
- Elevation: 380 m (1,250 ft)
- Highest elevation: 762 m (2,500 ft)
- Lowest elevation: 240 m (790 ft)
- Population (2023): 517
  - Density: 26.6/km^{2} (68.9/sq mi)
- Time zone: UTC+01:00 (CET)
  - Summer (DST): UTC+02:00 (CEST)
- INSEE/Postal code: 34251 /34700
- ^{1} French Land Register data, which excludes lakes, ponds, glaciers > 1 km^{2} (0.386 sq mi or 247 acres) and river estuaries.

Saint-Étienne-de-Gourgas (Languedocien: Sant Estève de Gorgàs) is a commune in the Hérault department in the Occitanie region in southern France.

== Geography ==
Saint-Étienne-de-Gourgas is known for the "Cirque du Bout du Monde" which was formed from a meander in the Ruisseau de la Bronzinadouïre that cut deeply into the plateau of the Causse du Larzac leaving the monumental chalk cliffs.

== Population ==
Historical population
Year	Pop.	±% p.a.
1968	233	—
1975	212	−1.34%
1982	254	+2.62%
1990	253	−0.05%
1999	308	+2.21%
2007	434	+4.38%
2012	454	+0.91%
2017	494	+1.70%
2023	517	+0.76%
Source: INSEE

== See also ==
- Communes of the Hérault department
