= Pointe d'Orny =

Mountain of the Mont Blanc massif

- Location within Switzerland

Highest point
- Elevation: 3,271 m (10,732 ft)
- Prominence: 183 m (600 ft)
- Coordinates: 46°00′07.7″N 07°02′33.8″E

Geography
- Location: Valais, Switzerland
- Parent range: Mont Blanc Massif

The Pointe d'Orny (3,271 m) is a mountain of the Mont Blanc massif, located west of Orsières in the canton of Valais. It lies north-east of the Plateau du Trient.

Below the summit lies the Cabane du Trient, a mountain hut operated by the Swiss Alpine Club.
