= List of volcanoes in Japan =

This is a list of active and extinct volcanoes in Japan. An Orange background indicates a volcano considered active by the Japan Meteorological Agency.

== Hokkaido ==
Name	Elevation (m)	Elevation (ft)	Coordinates	Last eruption
Akaigawa Caldera	725	2379	43.083°N 140.817°E	1.3 Ma BP (Note: Quaternary Volcanoes of Japan (2016) - Geological Survey of Japan)
Daisetsuzan Volcanic Group	2290	7513	43.663°N 142.854°E	AD 1739
Mount Eniwa	1320	4331	42.793°N 141.285°E	AD 1707
Mount E	613	2028	41.804°N 141.166°E	AD 1874
Mount Iō	512	1680	43.610°N 144.438°E	Not known
Akan Caldera	-	-	43.451°N 144.110°E	0.25 Ma BP
Mount Meakan	1499	4916	43.386°N 144.008°E	AD 2008
Mount Oakan	1370	4495	43.453°N 144.163°E	5 ka BP
Mount Iō	1563	5128	44.131°N 145.165°E	AD 1936
Kussharo Caldera	-	-	43.621°N 144.336°E	2.3 ka BP
Kuttara Caldera	581	1906	42.499°N 141.175°E	40 ka BP
Mashū Caldera	855	2805	43.570°N 144.565°E	1 ka BP
Nigorigawa Caldera	356	1168	42.12°N 140.45°E	15 ka BP
Nipesotsu-Maruyama Volcanic Group	2013	6604	43.453°N 143.036°E	AD 1898 (Note: 丸山 有史以降の火山活動 - Japan Meteorological Agency)
Niseko Volcanic Group	1309	4295	42.88°N 140.63°E	6 ka BP
Mount Onnebetsu	1330	4364	43.993°N 145.013°E	0.2 Ma BP
Oshima-Ōshima	737	2418	41.50°N 139.37°E	AD 1759
Mount Rausu	1661	5449	44.075°N 145.122°E	150 BP
Mount Rishiri	1721	5646	45.18°N 141.25°E	7.78 ka BP
Shikaribetsu Volcano Group	1430	4692	43.312°N 143.096°E	20 ka BP
Shikotsu Caldera	1320	4331	42.753°N 141.327°E	AD 1978
Mount Shiribetsu	1107	3632	42.767°N 140.916°E	Not known
Tōya Caldera	-	-	42.602°N 140.851°E	AD 2000
Mount Hokkaidō-Komagatake	1131	3711	42.063°N 140.677°E	AD 2000
Mount Shari	1547	5075	43.765°N 144.717°E	0.25 Ma BP
Mount Shiretoko	1254	4114	44.235°N 145.273°E	0.2 Ma BP
Mount Tarumae	1041	3416	42.690°N 141.376°E	AD 1981
Mount Tenchō	1046	3432	44.044°N 145.086°E	1.9 ka BP
Tokachidake Volcano Group	2077	6814	43.418°N 142.686°E	2004
Tokachi-Mitsumata Caldera	-	-	43.516°N 143.150°E	1 Ma BP
Tomuraushi-Chubetsu Volcano Group	2141	7024	43.527°N 142.849°E	0.1 Ma BP
Mount Unabetsu	1419	4656	43.876°N 144.876°E	0.5 Ma BP
Mount Usu	737	2418	42.543°N 140.839°E	AD 2000
Mount Yōtei	1898	6227	42.826°N 140.811°E	2.5 ka BP

== Honshū ==
Name	Elevation (m)	Elevation (ft)	Coordinates	Last eruption
Abu Volcano Group	-	-	34.50°N 131.60°E	Mt. Kasayama (ja): 8.8 ka BP
Mount Adatara	1718	5635	37.62°N 140.28°E	AD 1900
Mount Akagi	1828	5997	36.53°N 139.18°E	AD 1251? (Note: Akagisan - Japan Meteorological Agency)
Mount Akandana	2109	6919	36.200°N 137.572°E	10–6.5 ka (Note: 焼岳火山群 Yakedake Volcano Group - Geological Survey of Japan)
Mount Akita-Komagatake	1637	5371	39.75°N 140.80°E	AD 1971
Mount Akita-Yakeyama	1366	4482	39.964°N 140.757°E	AD 1997
Mount Amagi	1406	4613	34.862°N 139.002°E	0.2 Ma BP
Aonoyama Volcano Group	-	-	34.461°N 131.791°E	70 ka BP
Mount Asakusa	1585	5200	37.343°N 139.234°E	1.6 Ma BP
Mount Asama	2544	8340	36.405°N 138.522°E	AD 2019
Mount Ashitaka	1504	4934	35.219°N 138.800°E	80 ka BP
Mount Azuma	1705	5594	37.73°N 140.25°E	AD 1977
Mount Azumaya	2354	7723	36.542°N 138.413°E	0.3 Ma BP
Mount Bandai	1819	5968	37.60°N 140.08°E	AD 1888
Mount Chōkai	2237	7326	39.08°N 140.03°E	AD 1974
Mount Daisen	1729	5673	35.371°N 133.54°E	17 ka BP
Mount Daruma	982	3222	34.955°N 138.839°E	0.5 Ma BP
Eboshi Volcano Group	2227	7306	36.433°N 138.387°E	0.3 Ma BP
Mount Fuji	3776	12388	35.358°N 138.731°E	AD 1707
Mount Futamata (ja)	1548	5079	37.246°N 139.967°E	90 ka BP
Mount Gassan	1984	6509	38.549°N 140.027°E	0.3 Ma BP
Mount Hachimantai	1614	5295	39.95°N 140.85°E	7.3 ka BP
Hakkōda Caldera	-	-	40.693°N 140.930°E	0.4 Ma BP BP
Mount Hakkōda	1585	5200	40.656°N 140.881°E	600-400 BP
Mount Hakone	1438	4720	35.22°N 139.02°E	AD 2015
Mount Haku	2702	8865	36.15°N 136.78°E	AD 1659
Mount Haruna	1449	4754	36.47°N 138.88°E	AD 525-550 (Note: Harunasan - Japan Meteorological Agency)
Hijiori Caldera	516	1693	38.608°N 140.161°E	12 ka BP
Mount Hiuchigatake	2356	7730	36.95°N 139.28°E	AD 1544
Mount Hotaka (ja)	2158	7080	36.805°N 139.132°E	1 Ma BP
Mount Ibuki	1377	4518	35.25°N 136.24°E	Over 10 million years ago
Ikarigaseki Caldera	-	-	40.499°N 140.620°E	1.3 Ma BP
Mount Iiji	1112	3648	36.956°N 138.833°E	0.2 Ma BP
Mount Iizuna	1917	6289	36.739°N 138.136°E	0.15 Ma BP
Mount Iwaki	1625	5331	40.65°N 140.30°E	AD 1863
Izu-Tōbu Volcano Group	1406	4613	34.92°N 139.12°E	Teishi Knoll (ja): 1989
Mount Iwate	2041	6696	39.850°N 141.004°E	AD 1919
Kannabe Volcano Group	-	-	35.507°N 134.675°E	Mt.Kannabe: 20-10 ka BP
Mount Kanpū	355	1165	39.93°N 139.88°E	10 ka BP
Mount Kirigamine	1925	6316	36.103°N 138.196°E	0.75 Ma BP
Mount Komochi	1296	4252	36.591°N 138.998°E	0.2 Ma BP
Mount Kurohime	2053	6736	36.817°N 138.120°E	50 ka BP
Kurofuji Volcano Group	1642	5387	35.803°N 138.536°E	0.5 Ma BP
Mount Kurikoma	1628	5341	38.95°N 140.78°E	AD 1944 (Note: 栗駒山 有史以降の火山活動 - Japan Meteorological Agency)
Mount Kusatsu-Shirane	2160	7123	36.619°N 138.535°E	AD 2018 (Note: Quaternary Volcanoes of Japan (2019) - Geological Survey of Japan)
Mount Onoko	1208	3963	36.581°N 138.937°E	1.2 Ma BP
Mount Madarao	1382	4534	36.837°N 138.274°E	0.5 Ma BP
Mount Minakami	659	2162	36.554°N 138.222°E	0.3 Ma BP
Megata	291	955	39.95°N 139.73°E	20-29 ka BP
Mount Moriyoshi	1454	4770	39.977°N 140.544°E	0.5 Ma BP
Mukaimachi Caldera	-	-	38.75°N 140.51°E	0.6 Ma BP
Mount Mutsu-Hiuchi	781	2562	41.439°N 141.052°E	0.5 Ma BP
Mount Myōkō	2446	8025	36.891°N 138.113°E	3 ka BP (Note: Myokosan - Japan Meteorological Agency)
Mount Naeba	2145	7037	36.836°N 138.684°E	0.2 Ma BP
Mount Nanashigure	1063	3488	40.069°N 141.106°E	0.9 Ma BP
Mount Nantai	2484	8148	36.768°N 139.486°E	7 ka BP
Naruko Caldera	462	1542	38.73°N 140.73°E	AD 837 (Note: Narugo - Japan Meteorological Agency)
Mount Nasu	1917	6283	37.12°N 139.97°E	Mt. Chausu (ja): AD 1963
Mount Nekoma	1404	4606	37.615°N 140.016°E	0.8 Ma BP
Mount Niigata-Yakeyama	2400	7874	36.920°N 138.036°E	AD 2016
Mount Nikkō-Shirane	2578	8458	36.798°N 139.376°E	AD 1890
Nodai Caldera	-	-	41.267°N 140.867°E	1.9 Ma BP
Mount Nyohō	2483	8146	36.811°N 139.536°E	80 ka BP (Note: 栃木県北部，日光火山群女峰赤薙火山で約12-15万年前に起きた大規模山体崩壊 - 橘英彰)
Mount Norikura	3026	9928	36.106°N 137.55°E	2 ka BP
Numazawa (volcano)	1100	3609	37.454°N 139.572°E	5.4 ka BP
Oki-Dōgo	151	495	36.181°N 133.324°E	0.42 Ma BP
Okiura Caldera	-	-	40.567°N 140.733°E	1.5 Ma BP
Mount Omanago	2376	7795	36.796°N 139.507°E	0.47 Ma (Note: 東北日本・日光火山群の地質および岩石学 - 佐々木実 Minoru Sasaki)
Mount Ontake	3063	10049	35.890°N 137.48°E	AD 2020 (Note: 御嶽山 有史以降の火山活動 - Japan Meteorological Agency)
Onikobe Caldera	-	-	38.83°N 140.69°E	0.2 Ma BP
Mount Osore	879	2884	41.32°N 141.08°E	20 ka BP or 1787
Mount Sanbe	1126	3694	35.13°N 132.62°E	1.4-1.3 ka BP
Mount Shiga	2041	6696	36.70°N 138.52°E	10 ka BP
Mount Sukai	2144	7034	36.689°N 139.337°E	0.9 Ma BP
Mount Takahara	1795	5889	36.90°N 139.78°E	6.5 ka BP
Mount Takara	350	1148	35.346°N 134.919°E	0.3 Ma BP
Mount Takayashiro	1351	4432	36.799°N 138.403°E	0.2 Ma BP
Midagahara (A.K.A. Tateyama)	-	-	36.57°N 137.60°E	AD 1836 (AD 1949?)
Tazawako Caldera	-	-	39.722°N 140.661°E	1.4 Ma BP
Towada Caldera	1159	3802	40.47°N 140.92°E	AD 915
Washiba-Kumontaira	2924	9593	36.408°N 137.594°E	4000 BC
Mount Yake	2455	8054	36.226°N 137.587°E	AD 1963
Mount Yakeishi	1548	5079	39.164°N 140.829°E	0.2 Ma BP
Kita-Yatsugatake (Northern Yatsugatake Volcanic Group)	-	-	36.088°N 138.32°E	Mt.Yokodake: 0.9-0.7 ka BP
Minami-Yatsugatake (Southern Yatsugatake Volcanic Group)	-	-	35.971°N 138.37°E	0.1 Ma BP
Mount Tateshina (Part of Northern Yatsugatake Volcanic Group)	2530	8300	36.10°N 138.30°E	
Mount Zaō	1841	6040	38.15°N 140.45°E	AD 1940

== Izu Islands ==
Name	Elevation (m)	Elevation (ft)	Coordinates	Last eruption
Aogashima	423	1388	32.45°N 139.77°E	AD 1785
Bayonnaise Rocks	11	36	31.888°N 139.918°E	AD 1970 (Note: ベヨネース列岩 有史以降の火山活動 - Japan Meteorological Agency)
Hachijōjima	854	2802	33.13°N 139.77°E	AD 1605
Izu-Ōshima	758	2507	34.726°N 139.394°E	Mt. Mihara: AD 1990
Kōzushima	574	1877	34.22°N 139.15°E	AD 838
Kurose	-110	-361	33.40°N 139.68°E	Caldera: older than 20 ka BP (Note: 海域火山データベース Hachijyoujima - Japan Coast Guard)
Mikurajima	851	2792	33.871°N 139.605°E	6.3 ka BP
Miyakejima	813	2674	34.086°N 139.526°E	AD 2013 (Note: 三宅島 有史以降の火山活動 - Japan Meteorological Agency)
Myōjinshō (A.K.A. Myojin Reef)	-50	-164	31.918°N 140.021°E	AD 1970
Niijima	432	1417	34.37°N 139.27°E	Mt. Mukaiyama: 887
Sofugan (A.K.A. Lot's Wife)	99	325	29.793°N 140.342°E	(Discolored water: AD 1975)
Sumisujima (A.K.A. Smith Rocks)	136	446	31.439°N 140.05°E	AD 1916
Toshima	508	1667	34.52°N 139.28°E	9.1-4.0 ka BP
Torishima (A.K.A. Izu-Torishima)	394	1293	30.484°N 140.302°E	AD 2002

== Ogasawara Archipelago ==
The Ogasawara Archipelago include the Bonin Islands and Volcano Islands.

Name	Elevation (m)	Elevation (ft)	Coordinates	Last eruption
Nishinoshima	142	466	27.274°N 140.877°E	AD 2017
Fukutoku-Okanoba	-25	-82	24.28°N 141.485°E	AD 2021 (Note: 海域火山データベース Fukutoku-Oka-no-Ba - Japan Coast Guard)
Funka Asane	-20	-67	25.455°N 141.238°E	AD 1945
Kita-Iōjima (North Iwo Jima)	792	2598	25.43°N 141.28°E	0.14 Ma BP
Iōjima (Iwo Jima)	161	528	24.781°N 141.315°E	AD 2015
Kaitoku Seamount	-103	-338	26.127°N 141.098°E	AD 1984 (Note: Kaitoku Seamount - Japan Meteorological Agency)
Kaikata Seamount	-165	-541	26.667°N 140.929°E	(Submarine hydrothermal activity: AD 1988)
Kita-Fukutokutai	-55	-180	24.414°N 141.419°E	AD 1988?
Minami-Hiyoshi Seamount	-30	-98	23.5°N 141.935°E	AD 1976 (Note: 南日吉海山 有史以降の火山活動 - Japan Meteorological Agency)
Nikkō Seamount	-612	-2008	23.083°N 142.3°E	(Discolored water: AD 1979)
Mokuyō Seamount	-920	-3018	28.317°N 140.566°E	(Submarine hydrothermal activity: AD 1990)
Suiyo Seamount	-1418	-4652	28.6°N 140.633°E	(Submarine hydrothermal activity: AD 1991)

== Kyūshū ==
Name	Elevation (m)	Elevation (ft)	Coordinates	Last eruption
Aira Caldera	-	-	31.656°N 130.705°E	2017
Ata Caldera	-	-	31.359°N 130.683°E	0.11 Ma BP
Wakamiko Caldera	-	-	31.666°N 130.783°E	19 ka BP
Mount Aso (A.K.A. Aso Caldera)	1592	5223	32.881°N 131.106°E	AD 2021
Fukue Volcano Group	315	1033	32.653°N 128.861°E	unknown volcano: 2.4 ka BP
Mount Futago (ja)	720	2362	33.583°N 131.601°E	1.1 Ma BP
Ibusuki Volcanic Field	922	3025	31.22°N 130.57°E	30 ka BP
Ikeda (Part of Ibusuki Volcanic Field)	256	840	31.235°N 130.564°E	Mt. Nabeshima 4.9 ka BP
Imuta	509	1670	31.822°N 130.461°E	0.35 Ma BP
Mount Kaimon	922	3025	31.180°N 130.528°E	AD 885
Kakuto Caldera	-	-	32.0455°N 130.764°E	0.35-0.30 Ma BP
Mount Kinbō (Kinpō)	665	2182	32.814°N 130.639°E	0.2 Ma BP
Mount Kirishima	1700	5577	31.931°N 130.864°E	Mt. Shinmoedake: AD 2018
Kobayashi Caldera	-	-	31.99°N 130.976°E	0.4 Ma BP
Mount Kujū	1791	5876	33.083°N 131.251°E	AD 1996
Sakurajima	1117	3665	31.585°N 130.657°E	AD 2026 (Note: 噴火警報、噴火予報の発表状況 - Japan Meteorological Agency)
Ojikajima Volcano Group	111	364	33.201°N 129.063°E	0.3 Ma BP
Lake Sumiyoshi	-	-	31.771°N 130.591°E	8.2 ka BP (Note: Yonemaru and Sumiyoshiike: National catalogue of the active volcanoes in Japan - Japan Meteorological Agency)
Yonemaru	-	-	31.775°N 130.564°E	8.1-8 ka BP
Mount Takasaki	628	2060	33.252°N 131.524°E	0.5 Ma BP
Mount Tara	1076	3530	32.974°N 130.071°E	0.4 Ma BP
Mount Tsurumi and Mount Garan	1584	5197	33.28°N 131.432°E	AD 867
Mount Unzen	1500	4921	32.757°N 130.294°E	AD 1996
Mount Yufu	1583	5194	33.282°N 131.390°E	2.0-1.9 ka BP

== Ryūkyū Islands ==
Name	Elevation (m)	Elevation (ft)	Coordinates	Last eruption
Akusekijima	586	1923	29.45°N 129.60°E	Late Pleistocene
Gajajima	497	1631	29.903°N 129.541°E	0.2 Ma BP
Kogajajima	301	988	29.879°N 129.625°E	30-20 ka BP
Submarine Volcano NNE of Iriomotejima	-	-	24.558°N 124.00°E	AD 1924
Iōtorishima	212	696	27.877°N 128.224°E	AD 1968
Kikai Caldera	704	2310	30.789°N 130.308°E	Satsuma-Iōjima: AD 2013
Kuchinoshima	628	2060	29.967°N 129.924°E	0.84-0.78 ka BP
Kuchinoerabujima	649	2129	30.43°N 130.22°E	AD 2020
Nakanoshima	979	3212	29.859°N 129.856°E	Mt. Otake: AD 1914
Suwanosejima	799	2621	29.638°N 129.714°E	AD 2021
Yokoatejima	495	1624	28.799°N 128.996°E	younger than 10 ka BP

== See also ==
- Ring of Fire – Tectonic belt of earthquakes and volcanoes
