= Irao =

Irao could refer to:

- Portuguese name for Iran, country in West Asia; see List of country names in various languages (D–I)
- Inter RAO, Russian energy holding company
- Irao Island, island in the Philippines
- Irao-yama, mountain in Honshu, Japan
- Irish Republican Army Organisation, 1920s revolutionary group
