= Minami-Hiyoshi Seamount =

Active submarine volcano within the Volcano Islands, Japan

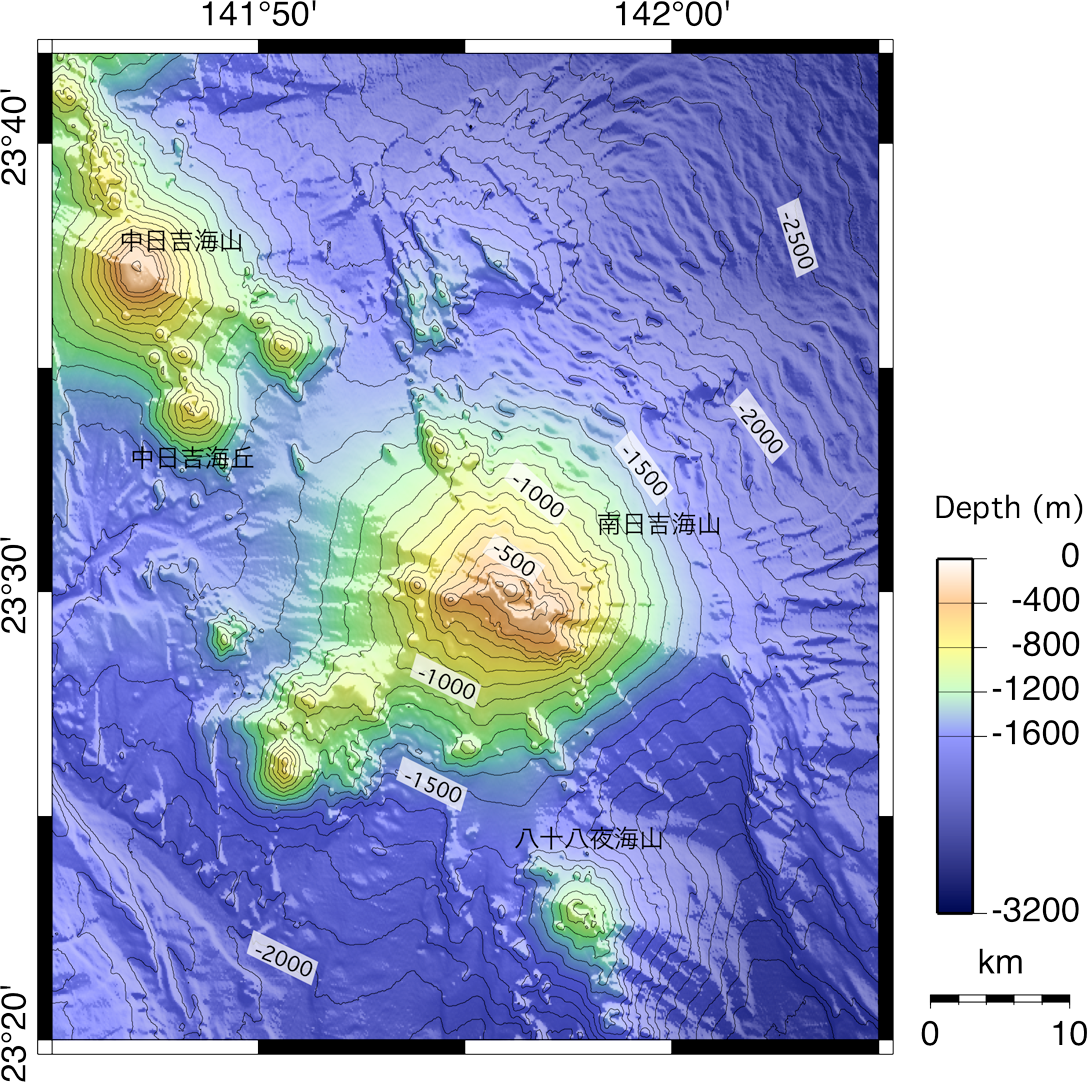
- Bathymetry map of Minami-Hiyoshi
- Summit depth: −107 m (−351 ft)
- Height: ~1,300 m (4,265 ft)

Location
- Range: Izu-Ogasawara Ridge
- Coordinates: 23°30′00″N 141°56′06″E
- Country: Japan

Geology
- Type: Stratovolcanoes
- Last eruption: 1975

The Minami-Hiyoshi Seamount is an active seamount in the Bonin Islands of Japan.

== Geography ==
Located 1,350 km (839 mi) south of Tokyo and 155 km (96 mi) south of Iwo Jima, The main cone of the Hiyoshi complex, the Minami-Hiyoshi is a stratovolcano with a base diameter of 19 km (12 mi) with a height above the seabed around 1,300 m (4,265 ft). The submarine volcano complex involves four submarine volcanic peaks; Kita-Hiyoshi, Naka-Hiyoshi, Minami-Hiyoshi and the Ko-Hiyoshi submarine volcanoes. This complex is geologically connected to the Izu-Mariana arc.

=== Composition ===
Unlike volcanoes of the south and central parts of the Mariana volcanic arc, which usually are made of low-alkali and mid-alkali tholeeite basalt, the Hiyoshi complex includes more alkaline lava with more K, Ba and Sr.

== Recent activity ==
In a report about the seismic activity of the volcano compiled in 2003, the active cone, Minami-Hiyoshi was reported to have "low activity" over the period of a month in 2001. Other than that, Minami-Hiyoshi has had many periods of activity including 1975, 1976, 1977, 1978, 1992 and 1996.

== Gallery ==
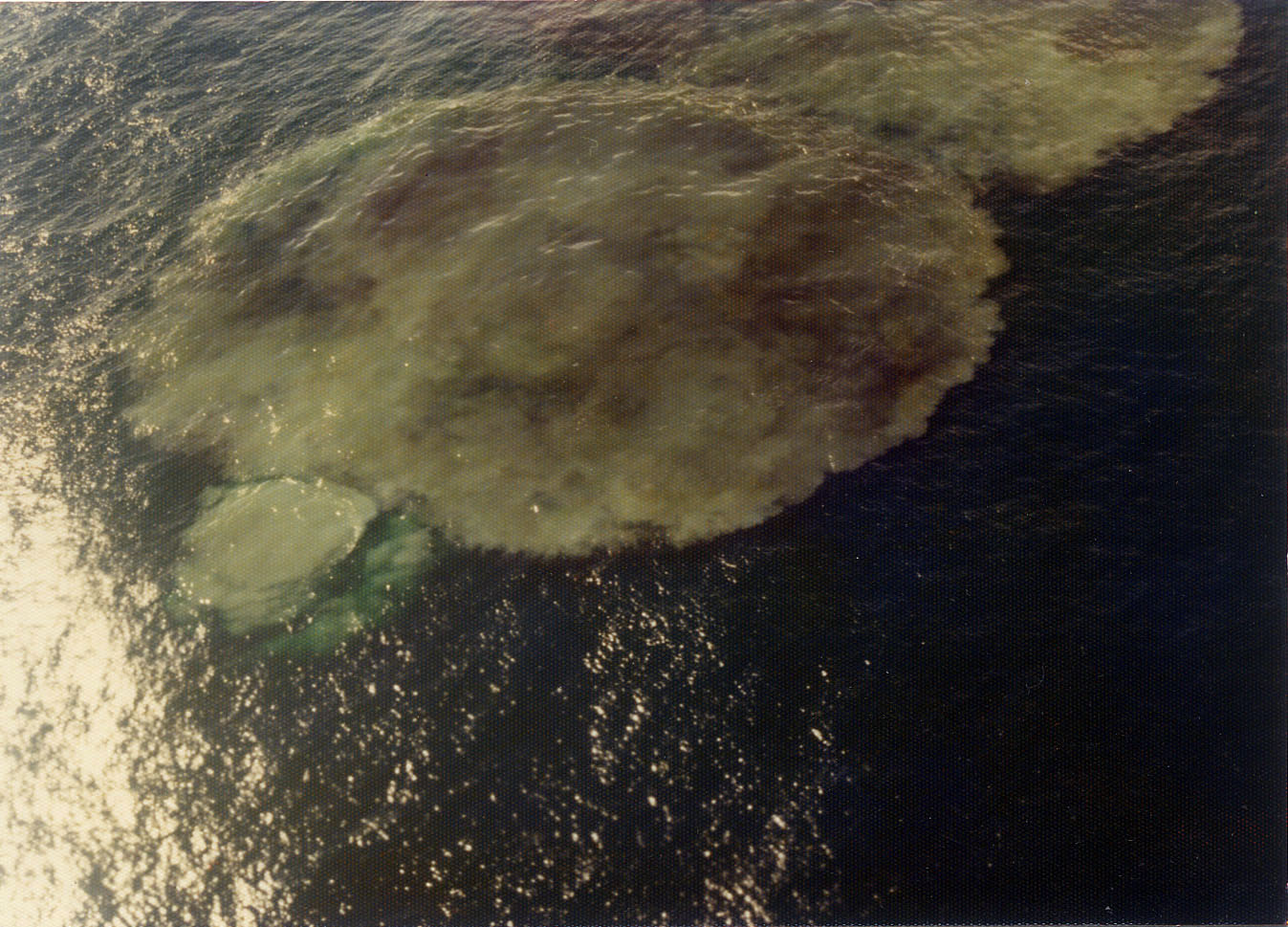
Activity at Minami-Hiyoshi on 10 January 1977

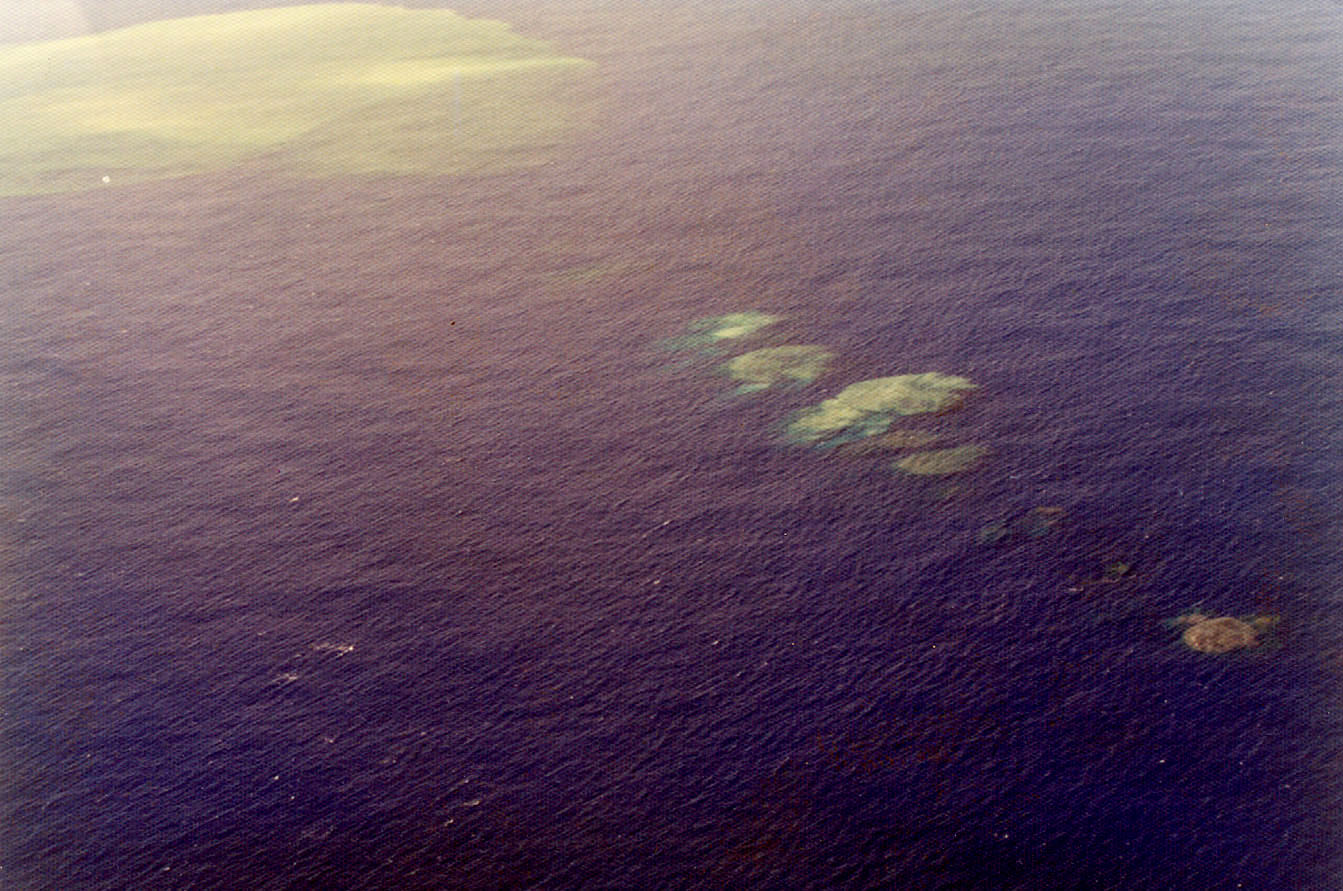
Rafts of volcanic rocks rising to the surface above the Minami-Hiyoshi volcano on 12 January 1977

== See also ==
- Kaitoku Seamount
- List of volcanoes in Japan
