= Naruko (volcano) =

Stratovolcano on the island of Honshu, Japan

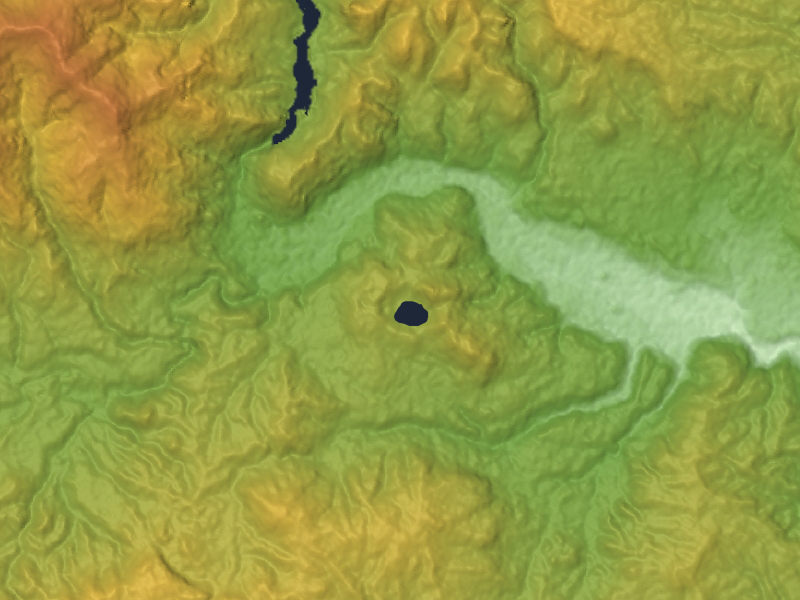
- Naruko Caldera

Highest point
- Elevation: 470 m (1,540 ft)
- Coordinates: 38.733°N 140.732°E

Naming
- Native name: 鳴子 (Japanese)

Geography
- Location: Honshū, Japan

Geology
- Mountain type: Caldera
- Volcanic arc: Northeastern Japan Arc
- Last eruption: May 837 CE

Naruko (鳴子火山群, Naruko kazangun) is a stratovolcano located in Ōsaki, Miyagi Prefecture, Japan. The volcano consists of a 7 km wide caldera with several lava domes. The summit of the 470 m high Mt. Kurumigatake is one of the four lava domes located in the center of the caldera. The volcano is well known because of its relationship to the Naruko Hot Springs Villages. However, its lack of well-defined features makes it difficult to recognize for a casual observer. The Japan Metrological Agency considers Naruko to be an active volcano.

The Naruko volcano was formed through two pyroclastic flows, which occurred 73,000 and 45,000 years ago. The first lava domes were formed approximately 20,000 years ago. The rocks produced by the pyroclastic flows and lava domes vary in composition, but are generally dacitic. Subsequent volcanic activity continued to create more lava domes, while also resulting in explosive eruptions that destroyed such domes. Tephra created by an explosive eruption approximately 18,000 years ago is said to be related to the formation of Katanuma lake. The lake is located in the center of the volcano, and is known as one of the most acidic lakes in Japan, with a pH around 1.6.

The only known historical eruption of the volcano is recorded in the Shoku Nihon Kōki. According to the document, "In 837, the Naruko volcano suddenly began to tremble for several days and finally exploded, spouting hot water which ran like a river. The people were surprised and reported this event to the imperial court, which enshrined a hot spring god." This event is believed to be a relatively small phreatic eruption that resulted in the collapse of a lava dome. This also led to the present-day name of the volcano, which is said to be derived from "narugō" (鳴郷) or "naru koe no sato" (鳴る声の郷), which literally means "the place with a trembling sound."

== See also ==
- List of volcanoes in Japan
