= Numazawa (volcano) =

Lake in Japan

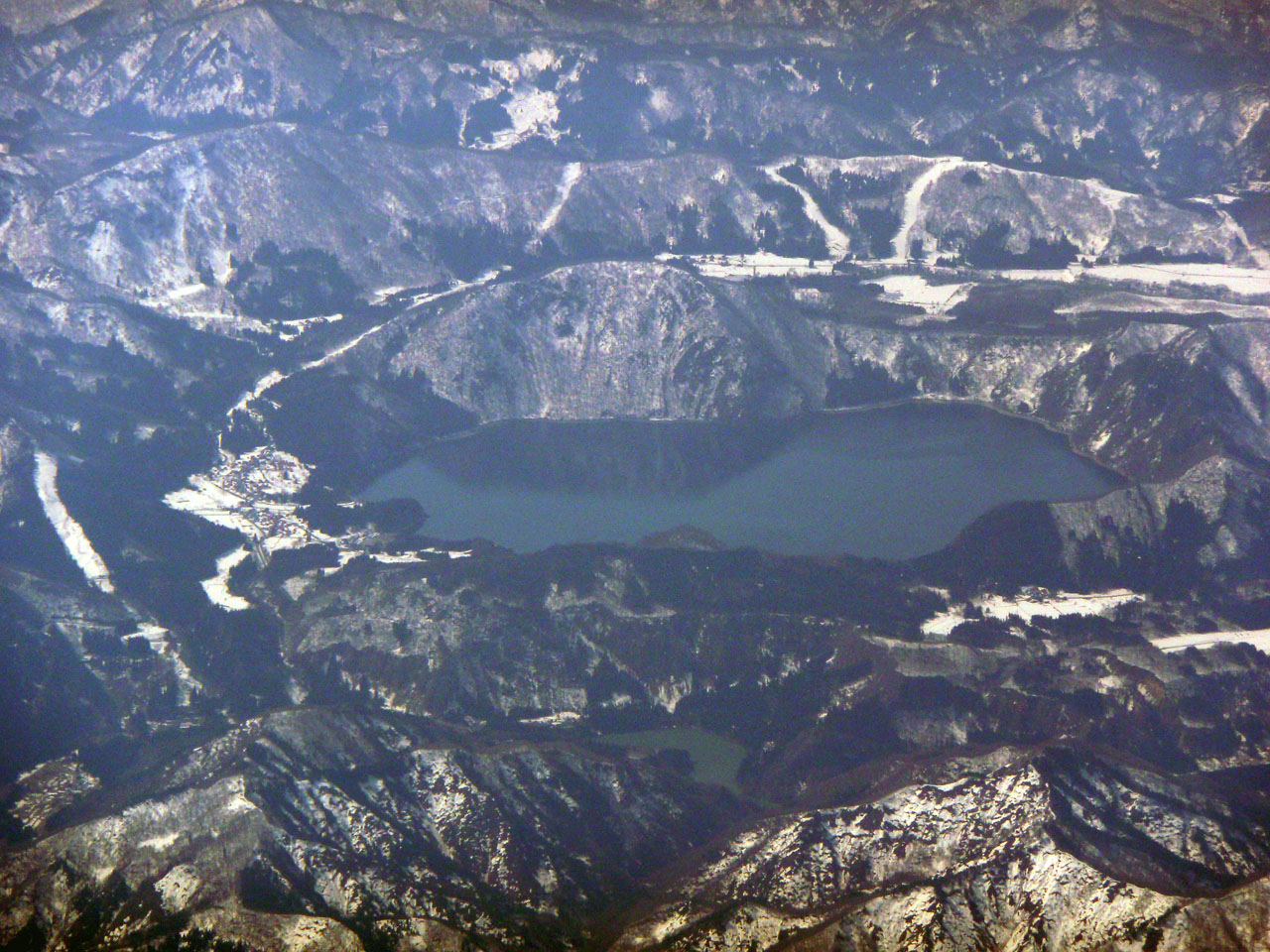
- Lake Numazawa

Highest point
- Elevation: 2,740 ft (840 m)
- Listing: Volcanoes in Japan
- Coordinates: 38°57′40″N 140°47′17″E

Geography
- Location within Japan
- Location: Fukushima Prefecture

Geology
- Mountain type: Shield volcano
- Volcanic arc: Northeastern Japan Arc
- Last eruption: 3,400 BCE

Numazawa is a caldera and lake in Ōnuma District of Fukushima Prefecture, Japan. The caldera measures 2 km (1.2 mi) across and the lake that occupies it measures 96 m (315 ft) deep. The volcanic caldera was constructed within the older and larger Uwaigusa caldera which is 4.2 to 4.0 million years old. The volcano first erupted 110,000 years before present (BP) produced pyroclastics. At 71,000 BP, the Mukuresawa lava dome formed, and at 45,000 BP, a Plinian eruption occurred. Two additional lava domes developed in 43,000 BP and 20,000 BP. The caldera-forming Plinian eruption occurred at 4,600 BP. A VEI 5 eruption occurred at 3,400 BP.

== See also ==
- List of volcanoes in Japan
- List of mountains in Japan
