= Mount Takahara =

Stratovolcano in Tochigi Prefecture, Japan

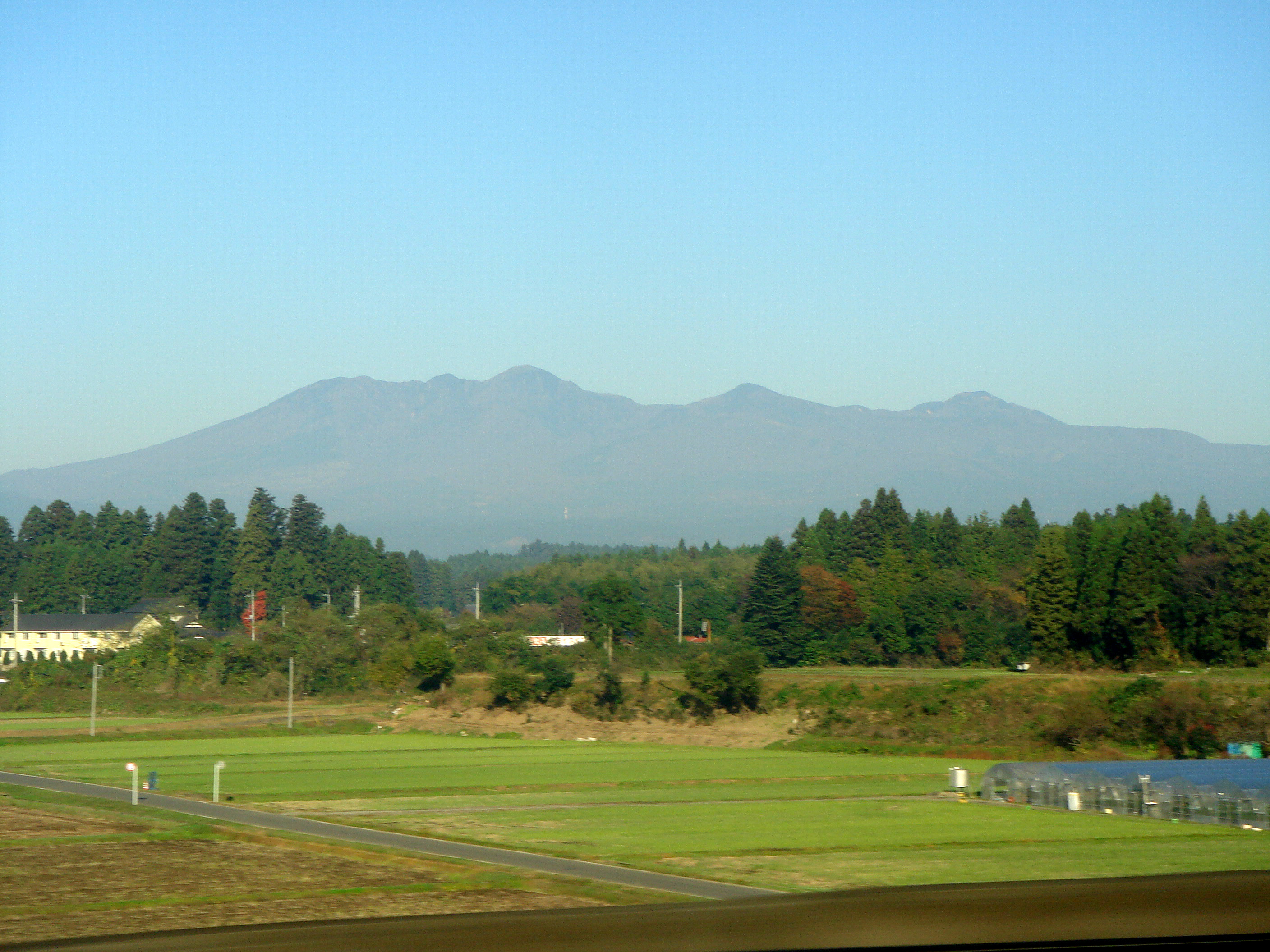
- Viewed from the southeast

Highest point
- Elevation: 5,889 ft (1,795 m)
- Listing: Volcanoes in Japan
- Coordinates: 36°54′00″N 139°46′37″E

Geography
- Location within Japan
- Location: Tochigi Prefecture

Geology
- Mountain type: Stratovolcano
- Volcanic arc: Northeastern Japan Arc
- Last eruption: 4570 BCE

Mount Takahara (Japanese: 高原山) is a stratovolcano in Tochigi Prefecture, Japan. It comprises three volcanic cones, Myojindake, Maekuroyama and Shakagadake, situated within the Shiobara caldera. The caldera-forming eruption occurred in the late Pleistocene. The tallest volcano in the group, Shakagatake, contains four more peaks. Volcanic activity at the present location occurred between 500,000 and 10,000 years ago, and ceased until about 6,500 years ago when a fissure eruption occurred on its northern part. It produced the Takahara-Uenohara tephra deposit, and by the end of the eruption, had formed the Fujiyama lava dome. No eruptions have occurred since, but the volcano has fumaroles and two earthquake swarms occurred during the late 1970s and early 1980s.
