= Nakanomine Kofun =

Kofun period burial mound in Gunma, Japan

- 中ノ峯古墳 (Japanese)
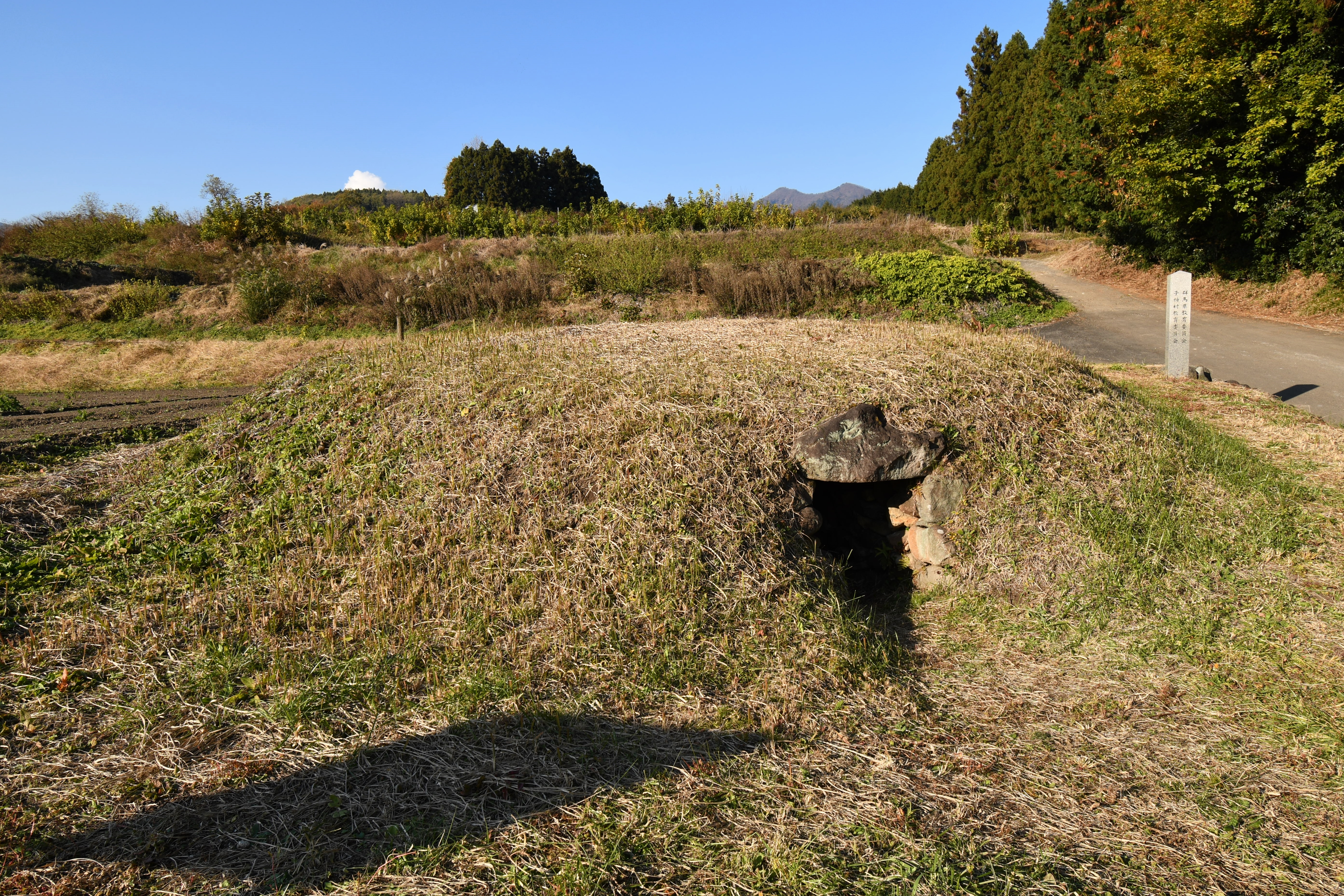
- Nakanomine Kofun

- Nakanomine Kofun Nakanomine Kofun (Japan)
- 36°31′55″N 138°59′26″E
- Type: Kofun
- Periods: Kofun period
- Location: Kitamoku-cho, Shibukawa, Gunma
- Region: Kantō region

History
- Built: late 6th century

Site notes
- Public access: Yes (park)
- Gunma Prefecture Historic Site

The Nakanomine Kofun (中ノ峯古墳) is a Kofun period burial mound, located in the Kitamoku neighborhood of the city of Shibukawa, Gunma in the Kantō region of Japan. The tumulus was designated a Gunma Prefecture Historic Site in 1980.

== Overview ==
The Nakanomine Kofun is an enpun (円墳)-style circular kofun constructed on the sloping edge of a cliff cut by the Agatsuma River at the southern foot of Mount Komochi in central Gunma Prefecture. It sits directly above a volcanic ash layer (Hr-FA, early 6th century) associated with the eruption of Mount Haruna's Futatsudake, and is buried in a pumice layer (Hr-FP, mid-6th century) associated with a second eruption, remaining almost completely intact. It was discovered and partially destroyed in 1979 during pumice mining, and subsequent archaeological excavations have been conducted.

The tumulus is a low, flat, circular shape, measuring nine meters in diameter (seven meters at the top) and 1.95 meters (valley side) and 0.70 meters (mountain side) in height, with a flat surface at the top. While fukiishi revetment stones are visible on the surface of the mound, no haniwa clay figures) have been found. A terrace 1.50 meters wide and a moat surround the mound.

The burial chamber is a small, sleeveless, horizontal-entry stone chamber opening to the south. The chamber measures five meters by 0.86 meters (back wall) or 0.76 meters (entrance) with a height of 1.3 meters. It is constructed of irregular masonry. Four sets of human remains (three adults and one infant), along with grave goods such as beads (three magatama, six tubular beads, one faceted bead, one abacus bead, one jujube-shaped bead, 15 mortar-shaped beads, and one hollow silver bead), two iron swords, nine iron arrowheads, two small knives, and Sue ware pottery, have been discovered inside the chamber. The construction period can be precisely dated to mid-6th century, during the late Kofun period, due to the volcanic ash layers, although there is evidence of subsequent burials dating up to the end of the 6th century.

The excavated artifacts are on display at the Shibukawa City Buried Cultural Properties Center.

The tumulus is approximately 2.5 kilometers east of the JR East Agatsuma Line Kanashima Station.

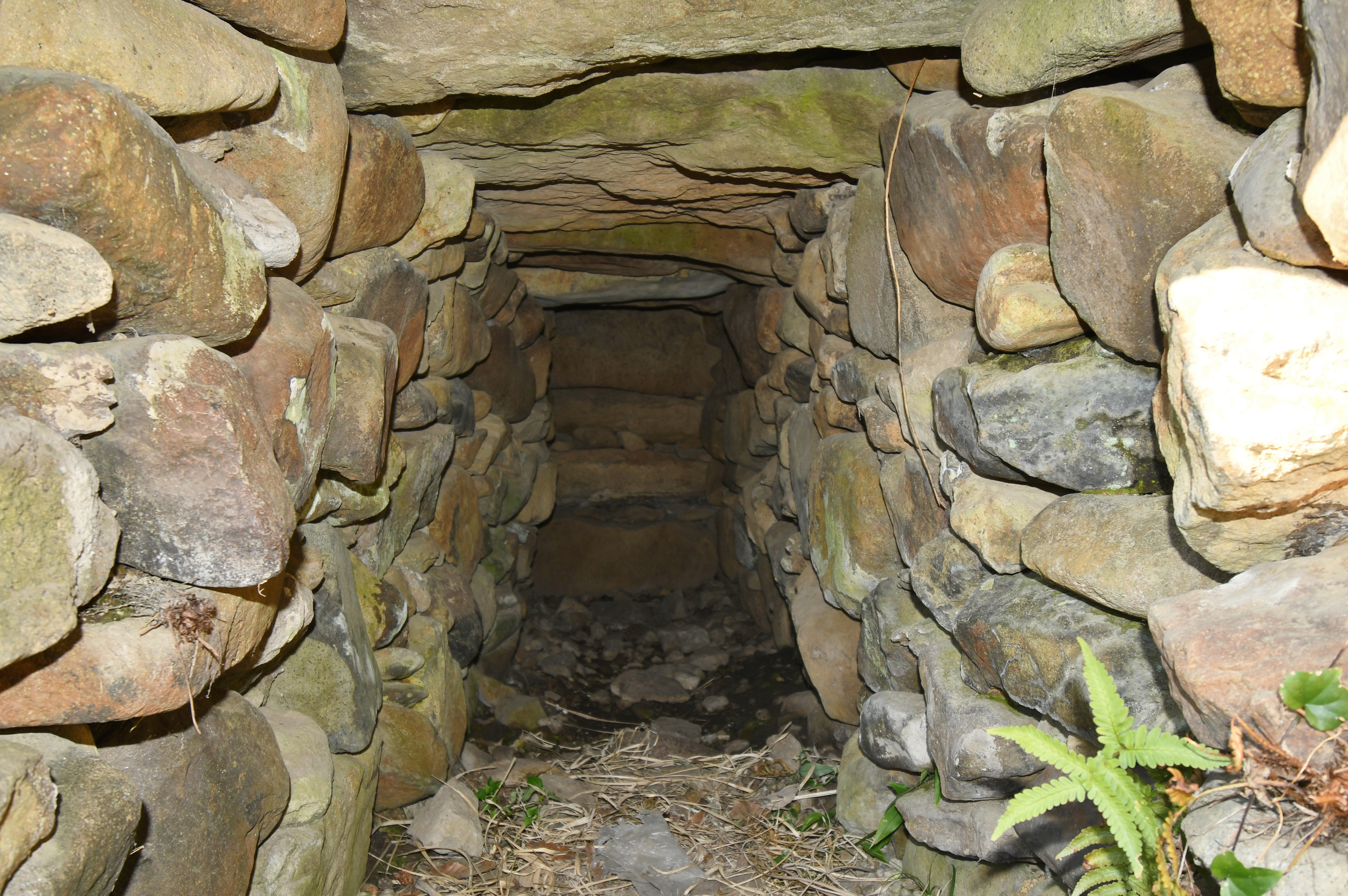
Entry to the Burial Chamber

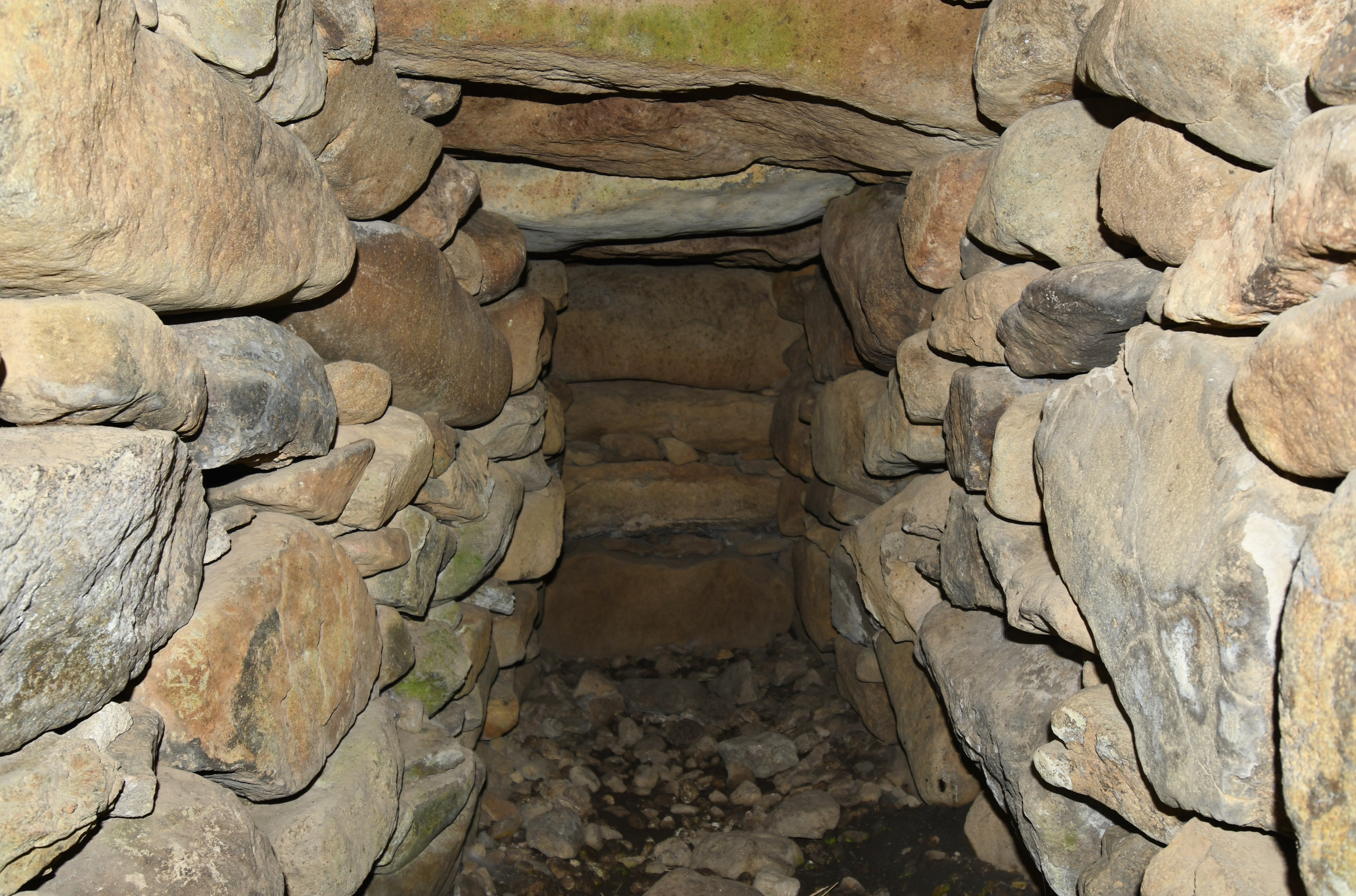
Burial chamber (towards the back)

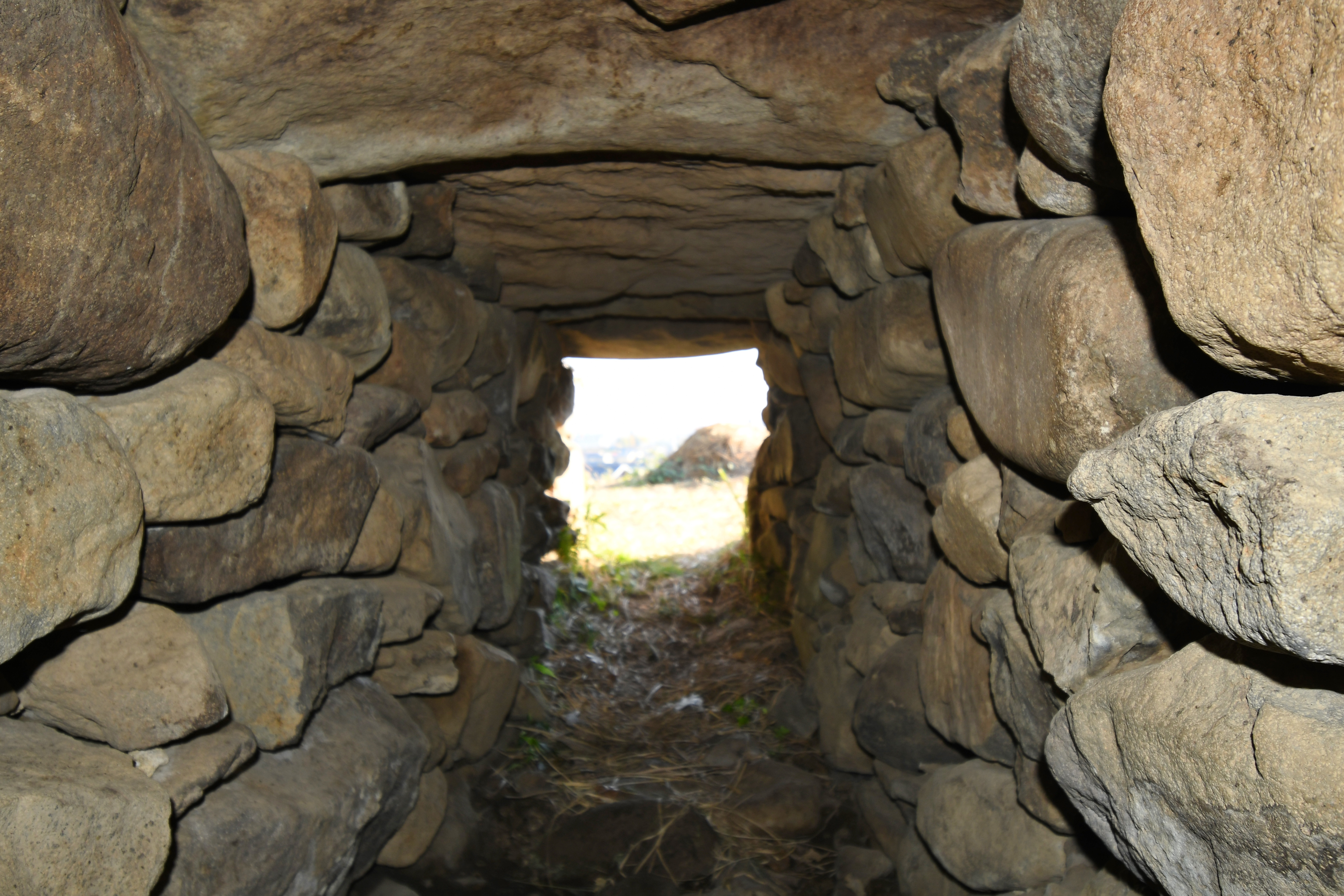
Burial chamber (towards the opening)）

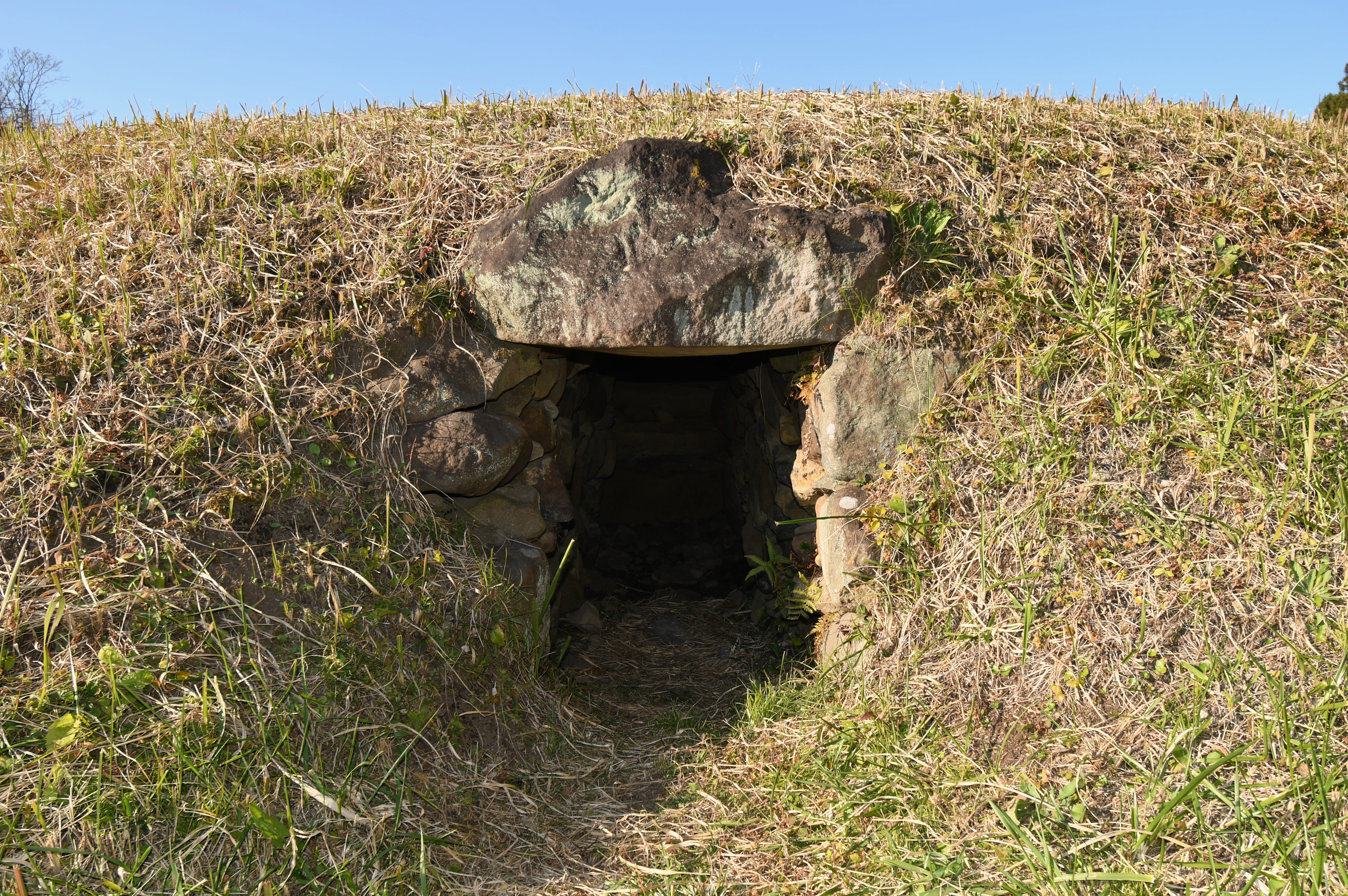
Opening

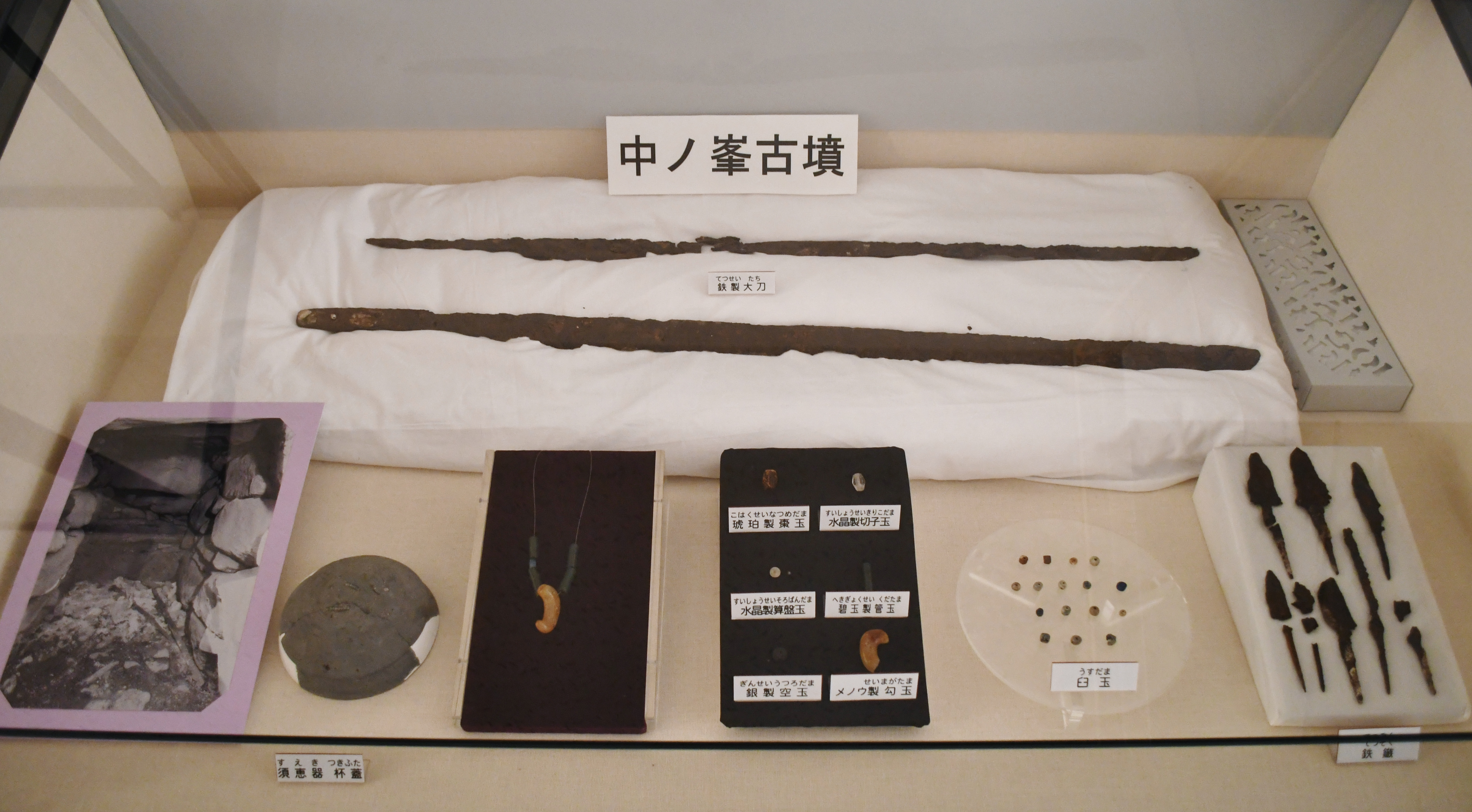
Artifacts now displayed at the Shibukawa City Buried Cultural Properties Center.

== See also ==
- List of Historic Sites of Japan (Gunma)
