= Kaitoku Seamount =

Active submarine volcano within the Volcano Islands, Japan

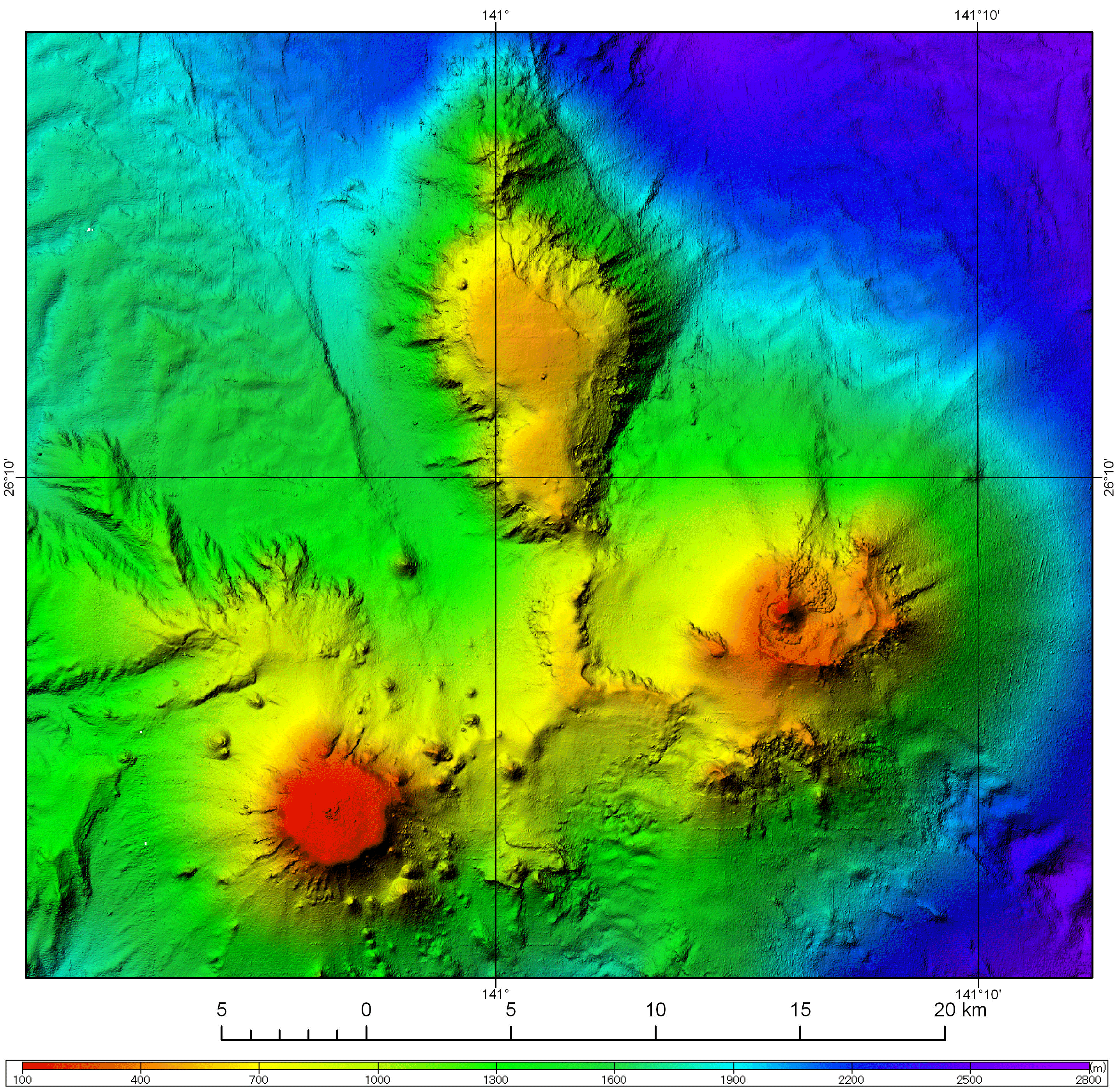
- Bathymetry map of Kaitoku
- Summit depth: −95 m (−312 ft)
- Height: ~2,500 m (8,202 ft)

Location
- Range: Izu-Ogasawara Ridge
- Coordinates: 26°07′37″N 141°06′07″E
- Country: Japan

Geology
- Type: Stratovolcanoes
- Last eruption: 2023

Kaitoku Seamount (海徳海山 in Japanese) is an active submarine complex volcano located in the Bonin Islands of Japan.

== Geography ==
The seamount, located 150 km (93 mi) southwest of Chichijima and 146 km (91 mi) north of the more famous Iwo Jima, is a triple-peaked seamount. The 2 southern peaks, from west to east, Saikai Tokuba and the Tokai Tokuba are the primary peaks of this seamount complex, with each of them with a depth of −95 m (−312 ft) and −100 m (−328 ft) in their respective order. Saikai Tokuba, the non-eruptive part of the volcano, has a stratovolcanic structure with a flatter peak. Tokai Tokuba, the eruptive part of the volcano, is a caldera with the active cone on the peak. The northern peak, with a summit depth of around −506 m (−1,660 ft) is believed to be a pile of basaltic lava extrusions.

=== Composition ===
Despite the northern peak having basaltic composition, the pumice from Tokai Tokuba's 1984 eruption was recorded to be dacitic.

== Geologic setting ==
The Volcano Islands range which Kaitoku is situated within is a part of the Izu-Mariana range which is caused by the subduction of the Pacific Plate under the Philippine Sea Plate.

== Activity ==
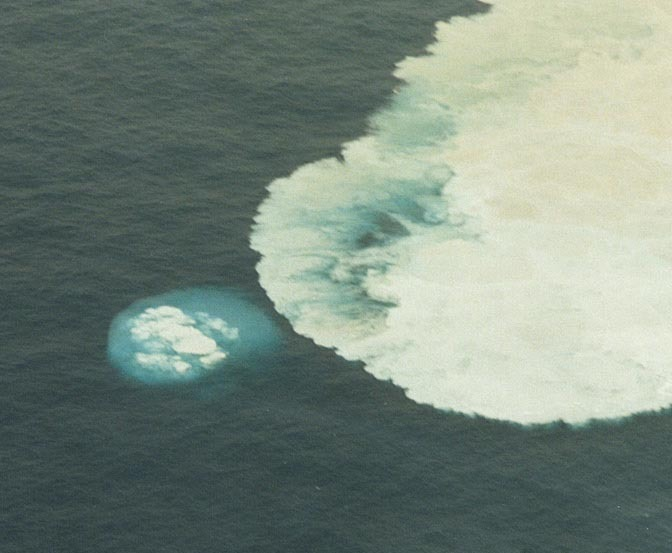
Pumice rafts emitted from Kaitoku on March 15, 1984

Kaitoku has had an activity period in 1543, 1984, 2001 and 2022, the most documented one being the 1984 eruption. All of these eruptions have been rather weak, with a Volcanic Explosivity Index of 0. The volcano is actively monitored by the Japan Coast Guard.

=== 1984 eruption ===
On 7 March 1984, the Japanese Coast Guard reported discolored water near the volcano. The next day, the volcano reportedly started erupting rocks which didn't reach the sea surface. In March 16, a reef-like pile of black rocks rose onto the sea surface. In March 23, the eruption finally breached the surface and explosions reached a height of around 160 m (525 ft). 3 days later, the eruption calmed down and continued under the sea level. In July, the activity of the volcano completely ceased.

==== Chemical composition ====
After the 1984 eruption in March, pumice rock was collected which had a composition of 62.3% silicon dioxide (SiO_{2}), 5.2% sodium oxide (Na_{2}O) and 1.4% potassium oxide (K_{2}O). 7 samples of discolored water were taken and were observed by research vessels which found a pH level of 7.8-8.11 which correlates to basic composition. In the same samples, the amount of iron (Fe) in mg/L was found in between 0.01-0.32 and the amount of SiO_{2} per L was found in between 0.37-0.58 mg.

==== Mystery cloud ====
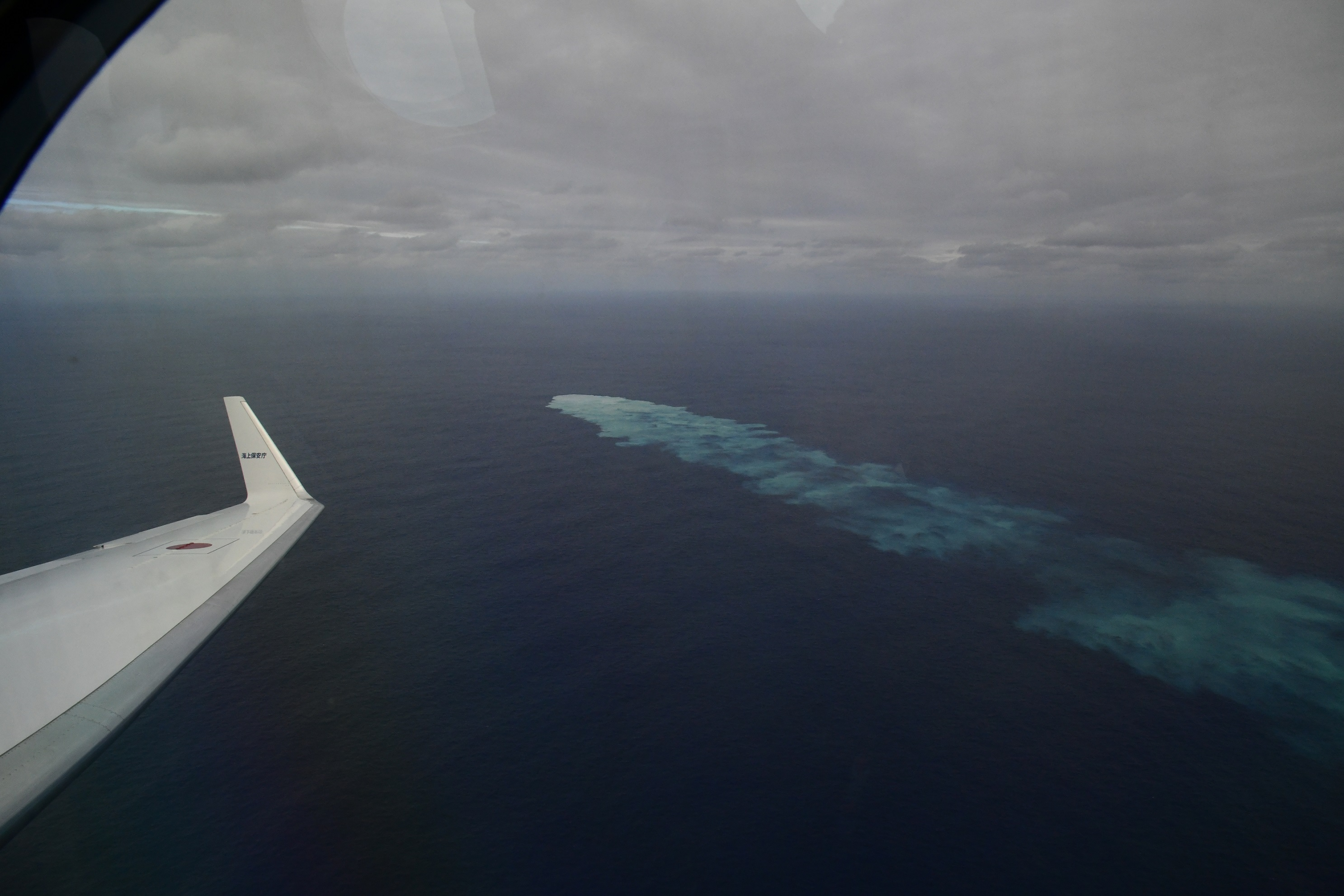
Spreading rafts of pumice rocks on 25 November 2022

It was suspected that a "mystery cloud" 180 miles off the east coast of Japan spotted by 3 crews of separate airliners on 9 April 1984 was connected to the Kaitoku Seamount, which coincidentally was erupting in the same period. Later, following research, it was proven that it was very likely not from Kaitoku but rather from a 'natural phenomenon' or a man-made explosion.

=== 2022 activity ===
There were several months of activity within 2022 for Kaitoku which were August, October, November and December. In August, only discolored water was observed, however in October and November, the extrusion of rocks breached the surface and in December the pile of pumice travelled 10 km away from the vent of the volcano. The December activity has continued into 2023.

== Gallery ==
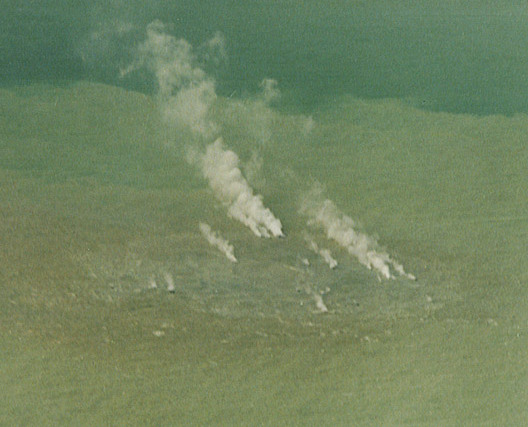
Steaming pumice over the sea surface on 19 March 1984

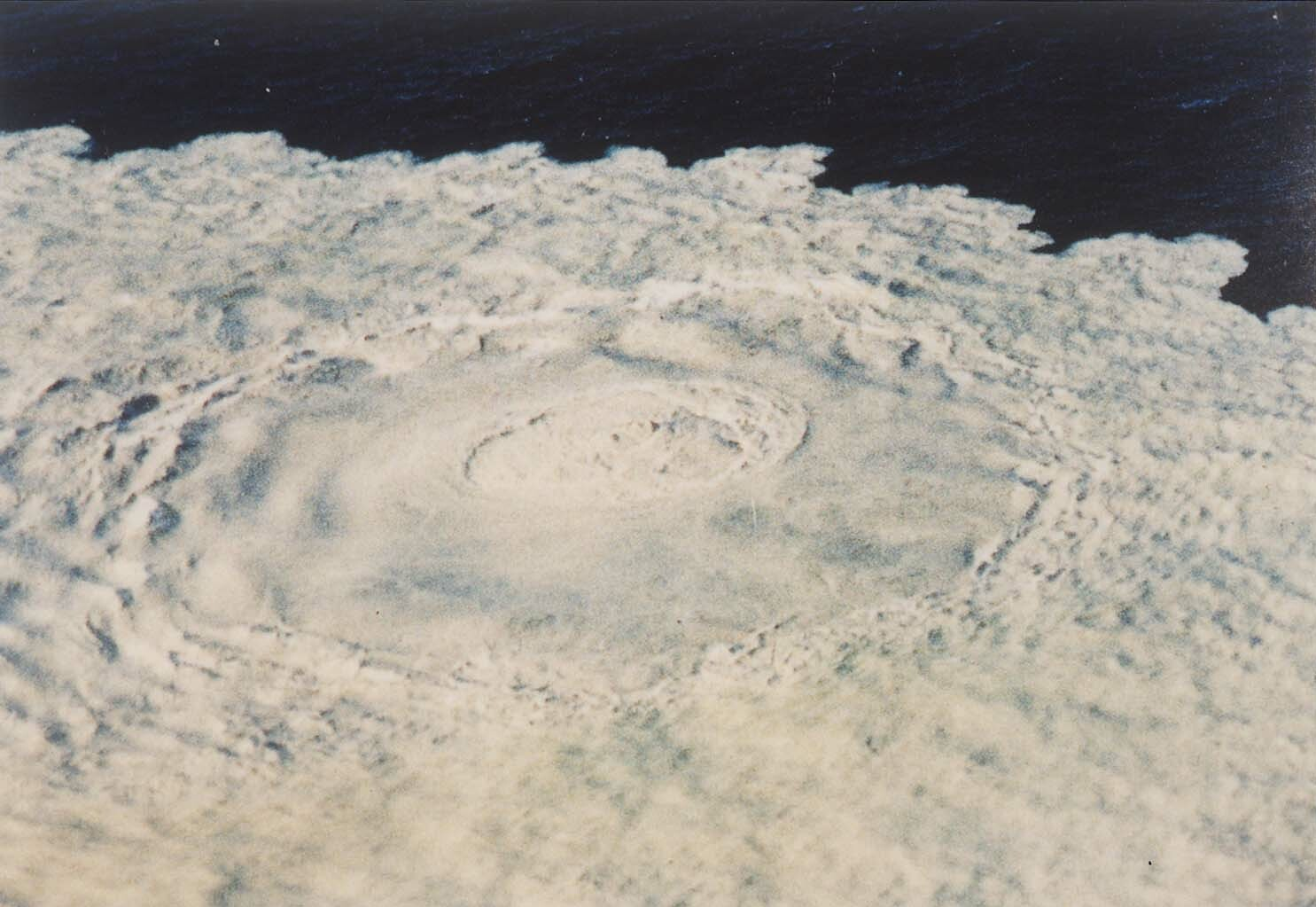
Tokai Tokuba emitting pumice on 29 March 1984

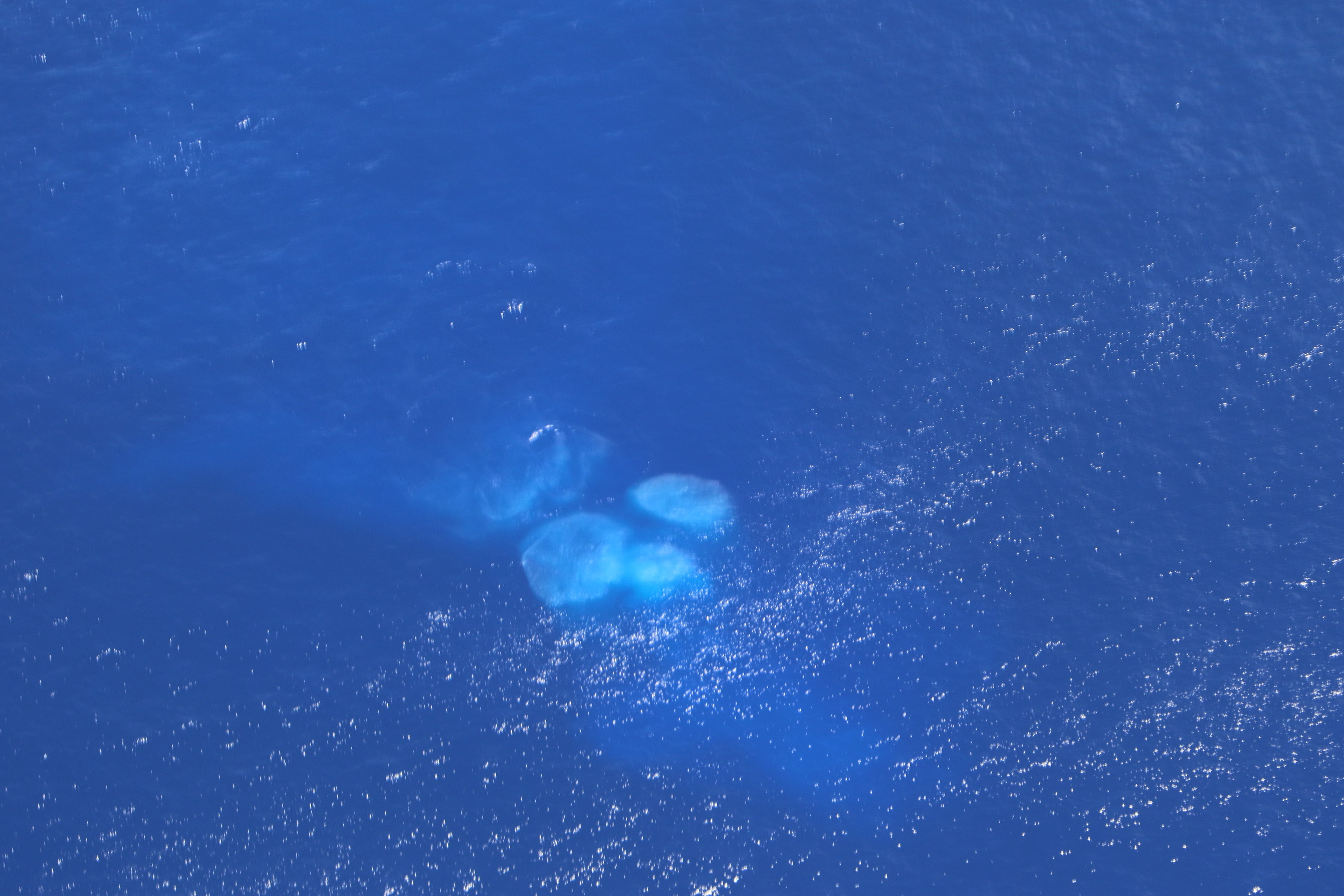
Discolored water over Tokai Tokuba on 28 August 2022

== See also ==
- Suiyo Seamount
- Nishinojima
