= Mount Komochi =

Volcano on the island of Honshu, Japan

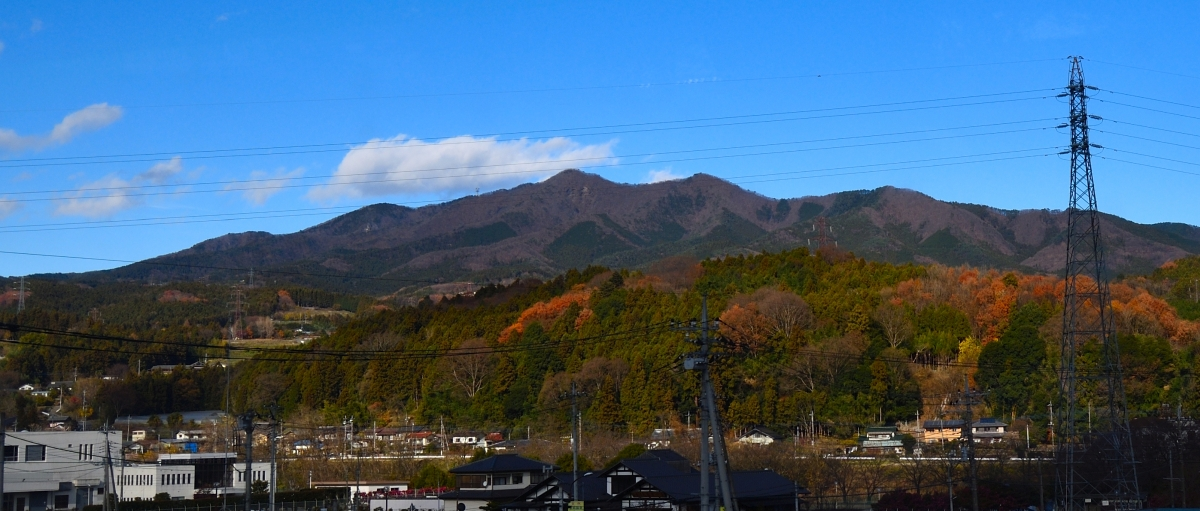
- Mount Komochi seen from the SSW.

Highest point
- Elevation: 1,296 m (4,252 ft)
- Prominence: 597 m (1,959 ft)
- Listing: Mountains of Japan; Volcanoes of Japan
- Coordinates: 36°35′30″N 138°59′52″E

Naming
- Native name: 子持山 (Japanese)

Geography
- Location within Gunma Prefecture Location within Japan
- Location: Gunma Prefecture, Japan

Geology
- Mountain type: Stratovolcano
- Volcanic arc: Northeastern Japan Arc

Mount Komochi (子持山, Komochi-yama) is a volcano in Gunma Prefecture, Japan. Its elevation is 1,296 metres (4,252 ft) and its prominence is 597 metres (1,959 ft).

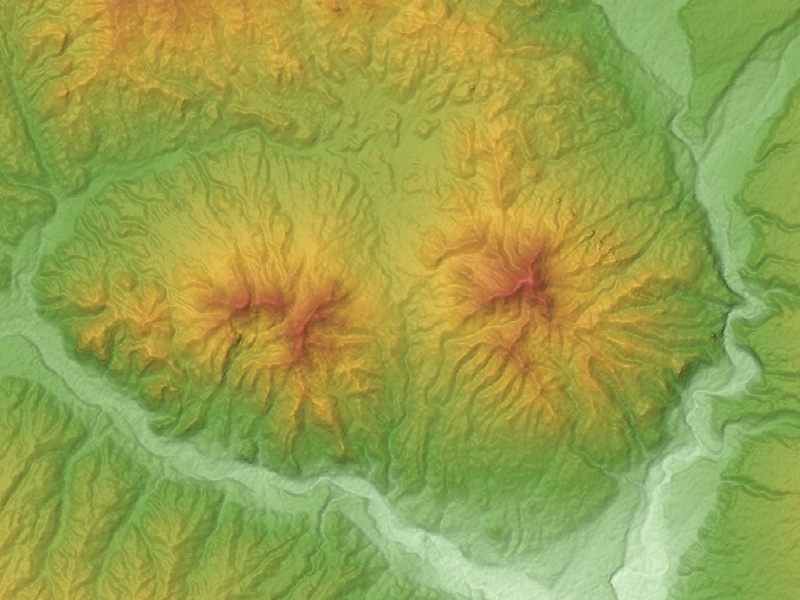
Onoko Volcano (Left) Komochi Volcano (Right)
