= Mount Sanbe =

Stratovolcano in Japan

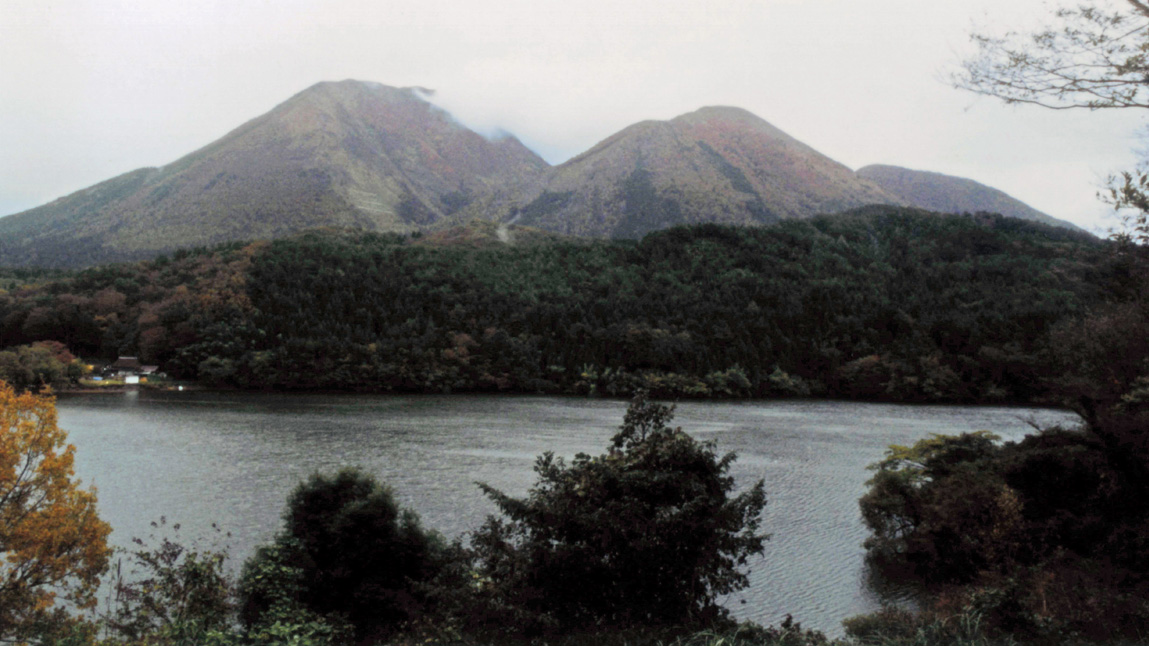
- Viewed from the west in 1990

Highest point
- Elevation: 3,694 ft (1,126 m)
- Listing: Volcanoes in Japan
- Coordinates: 35°08′28″N 132°37′19″E

Geography
- Location within Japan
- Location: Shimane Prefecture

Geology
- Mountain type: Stratovolcano
- Last eruption: 650 CE

Mount Sanbe, also known as Sanbesan, is an active stratovolcano in Ōda, Shimane Prefecture. The highest peak, Osanbe, has an elevation of 1,126 m (3,694 ft). At the center of the volcano is a caldera 1 km (0.62 mi) across. The volcano's composition is mainly dacite and andesite.

Volcanic activity was believed to have started 100 thousand years ago. The volcano frequently produces explosive eruptions with several classified as Plinian eruptions. All of these explosive eruptions occurred during the Pleistocene while one occurred in the Holocene at the Taiheizan lava dome approximately 3,700 years ago. The Holocene eruption triggered pyroclastic flows down the northeastern and southeastern flanks, reaching the Hayamizu River in the south. More recent eruptions have taken place but they are not precisely dated.

== See also ==
- List of volcanoes in Japan
- List of mountains in Japan
