= Megata =

Volcano in Tohoku, Japan

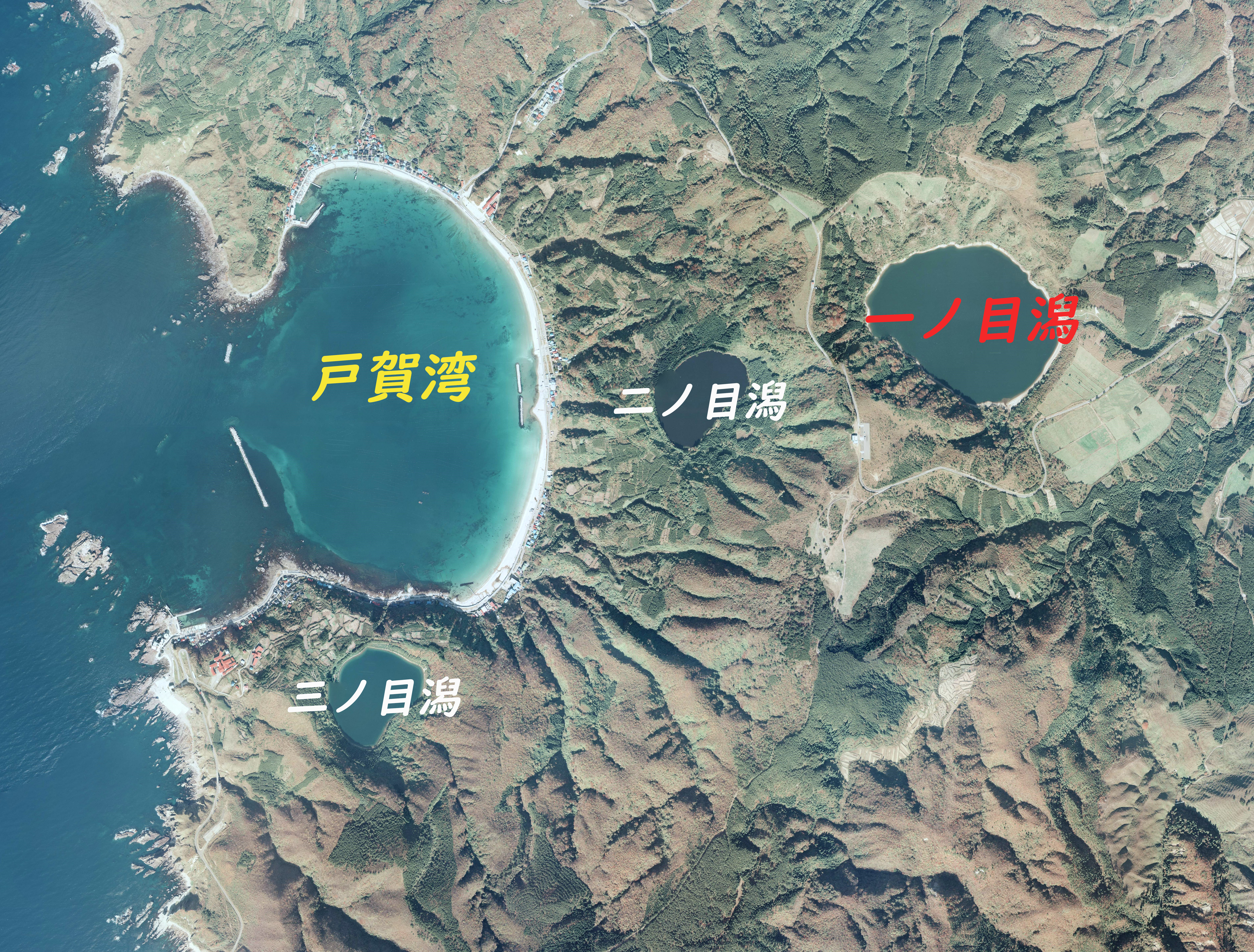
- Megata volcanic group onshore and Toga off the western shore of the peninsula

Highest point
- Coordinates: 39.955681°N 139.7386°E

Geography
- Location within Japan
- Location: Honshu, Japan

Geology
- Mountain type: Maar
- Volcanic arc: Northeastern Japan Arc
- Last eruption: Pleistocene

Megata is a volcanic group on the Oga Peninsula in northwestern Honshu, Japan. It consists of three basaltic-to-dacitic maars at the edge of the peninsula. These maars measuring between 300 m (980 ft) and 600 m (2,000 ft) across are filled with water, forming freshwater lakes. Ichinomegata is the widest and oldest of the three. These features date to around the Pleistocene although pottery discovered between layers of tephra has been dated to 4,000 years before present. An older and larger maar is located offshore on the western coast of the peninsula, known as Toga (Togowan), it formed 450,000 years ago. The western wall of Toga maar is breached, forming a bay.

Ichinomegata maar has a depth of 44.6 m (146 ft). The depth of Ninomegata is 11.8 m (39 ft).
