= Sakhalin Island Arc =

Ancient volcanic arc dating from the Early Miocene

Coordinates: 51°N 143°E

The Sakhalin Island Arc (Russian: Сахалинские острова) is an ancient volcanic arc dating from the Early Miocene. The arc was a result of the Okhotsk Plate subducting beneath the Eurasian Plate in the convergence zone. The arc runs from mainland Asia through Sakhalin Island into central Hokkaido and the collision zone around the Daisetsuzan Volcanic Group, where the Kuril Island Arc and the Northeastern Japan Arc meet.
