= Kurose Hole =

Submarine caldera off the coast of Japan

- Summit depth: 107 m (351 ft)

Location
- Location: Izu Islands, Japan
- Coordinates: 33.40°N 139.68°E
- Country: Japan

Geology
- Type: Submarine volcano
- Age of rock: Holocene?
- Last eruption: Unknown

Kurose Hole is a submarine caldera located between Mikurajima and Hachijōjima in the Izu Islands chain. The caldera is 600–760 m deep and 5–7 km wide.

== See also ==
- List of volcanoes in Japan
