= Abu (volcano) =

Group of shield volcanoes on the island of Honshu

Abu (Abu Volcano Group)
- 阿武火山群
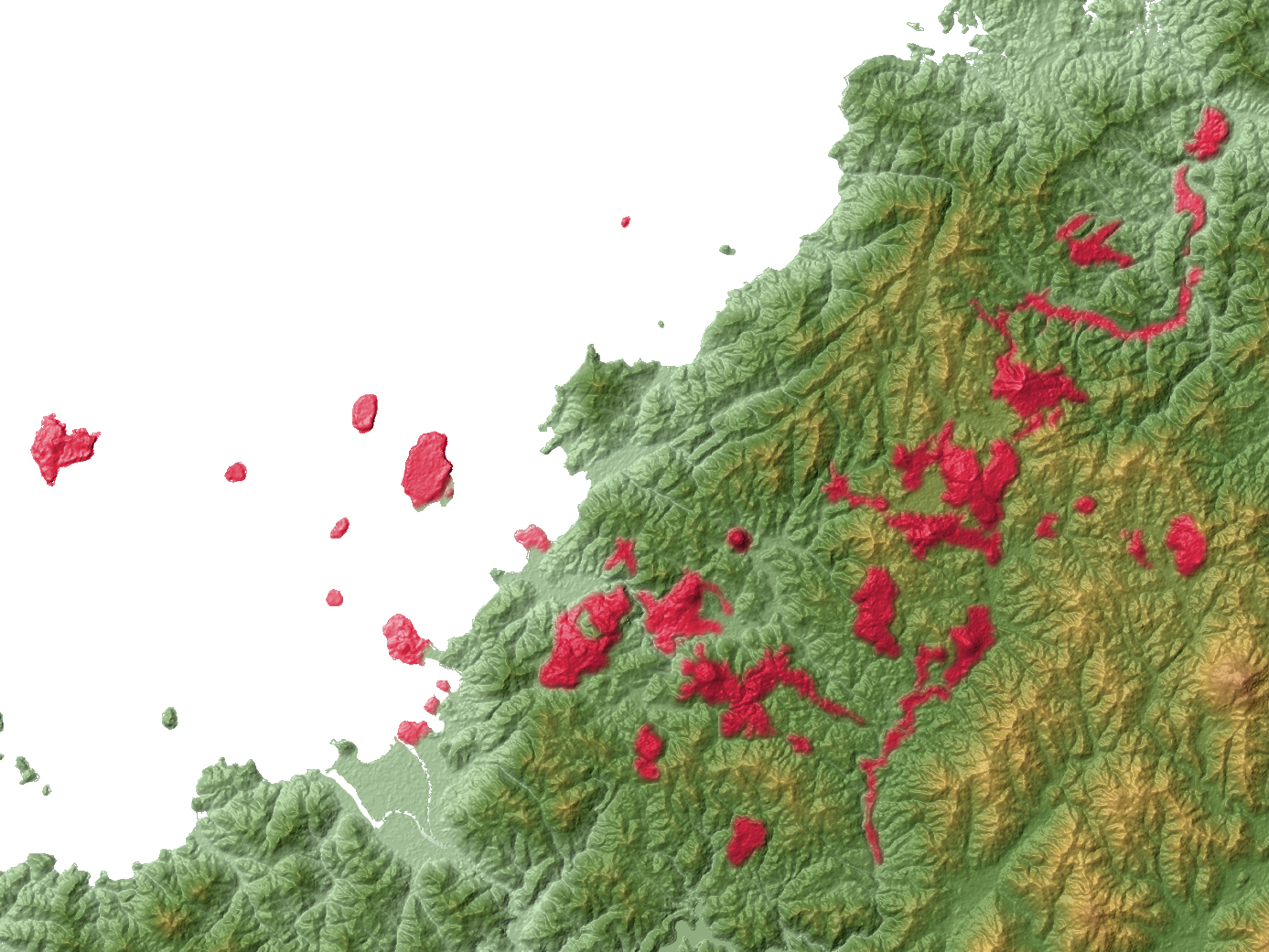

Highest point
- Elevation: 641 m (2,103 ft)
- Listing: List of volcanoes in Japan
- Coordinates: 34°30′N 131°36′E

Geography
- Location within Yamaguchi Prefecture
- Location: Honshu, Japan

Geology
- Rock age: 800,000 years
- Mountain type: Monogenetic volcanic field
- Last eruption: 6850 BCE

Abu (阿武火山群, Abu Kazan-gun) is the name of a group of shield volcanoes located on the coast of Japan on the southwest end of the island of Honshū. It is primarily based in the city of Hagi, Yamaguchi Prefecture.

The group dates from 800,000 years ago and was active into the Holocene era. The last eruption occurred around 9000 years ago.

The group of volcanoes consists of basalt and dacitic lava flows, small shield volcanoes, cinder cones, and lava domes. Altogether, there are about 40 volcanoes, with the highest peak being Irao-yama.

Volcanic activity in the region is related to subduction of the Philippine Sea Plate.

The erupted magmas of Abu are mainly alkaline basalt and calc-alkaline andesite - dacite in composition.

== See also ==
- List of volcanoes in Japan
- List of mountains in Japan
