= Irao Island =

Island of the Philippines

Geography
- Location: Cagayan Valley, Cagayan, Philippines
- Coordinates: 18°59′N 121°13′E
- Highest elevation: 23 m (75 ft)

Additional information

Irao Island (Iroo Island) is an island of the Philippines. Its highest elevation is about 23 m (75 ft.). It is one of the islands on the Babuyan Islands. It is found in Cagayan Valley, Cagayan.
