= Suiyo Seamount =

Submarine volcano of the Izu Islands, Japan

- Location within Pacific Ocean
- Summit depth: 1,418 m (4,652 ft)
- Height: ~1,400 m (4,593 ft)

Location
- Range: Izu–Ogasawara Trench
- Coordinates: 28°36′0″N 140°38′0″E
- Country: Izu Islands, Japan

Geology
- Type: Seamount (submarine volcano)
- Volcanic arc/chain: Shichiyo Seamounts

Suiyo Seamount is a seamount (submarine volcano) off the eastern coast of Japan, directly south of Torishima and Sofugan volcano at the southern tip of the Izu Islands. The volcano is one of the Shichiyo Seamounts, a small group of submarine volcanoes named after different days of the week ("Suiyo" means "Wednesday" in Japanese).

Suiyo consists of a basaltic to dacitic submarine caldera and lava dome, and rises about 1,400 m (4,590 ft) from its base on the sea floor to within 1,418 m (4,652 ft) of the surface. Suiyo has a prominent summit caldera, 1.5 km (0.9 mi) wide and 500 m (1,640 ft) deep.

The volcano's excised (weathered) structure suggests that it is of older age then some of the other volcanoes in the group. Suiyo is covered by a thick sediment cap, a feature that collects over a long span of inactivity, and fault patterns and valleys have been observed on its flanks.

Suiyo Seamount is associated with a magnetic anomaly: ocean-floor surveys of it and the surrounding area found that a large negative rock body existed to the east of the seamount, while positive bodies existed to the northwest and south. The reasons for this complex anomaly, which also exists in several other nearby seamounts, are unknown, but is suggested to be the result of interactions between different magnetic fields of different ages.

A burst of hydrothermal activity was observed in July 1991, raising water temperatures at the vent to 290 °C (550 °F); following the event, the volcano, until then thought extinct, was reclassified as active by the Japan Meteorological Agency. A bathymetric survey of the volcano found sulfur-oxidizing microbes to be predominant, and concluded that Suiyo Seamount was a natural "incubator" for this bacterial type.

== See also ==
- List of volcanoes in Japan
