= Nishinoshima (Ogasawara) =

Active volcanic island belonging to the Volcano Islands arc

Native name: 西之島
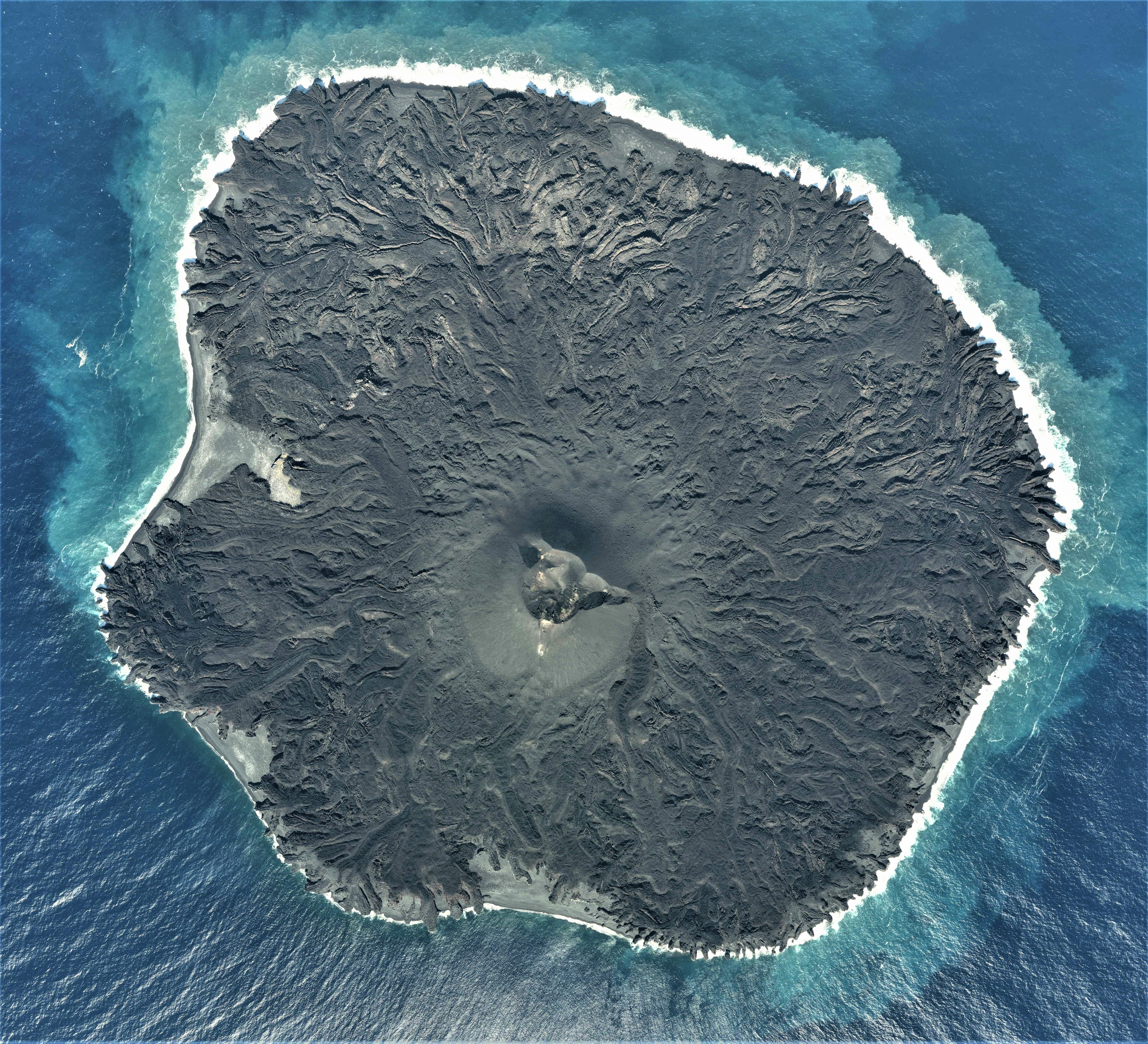
- Nishinoshima on 1 December 2018

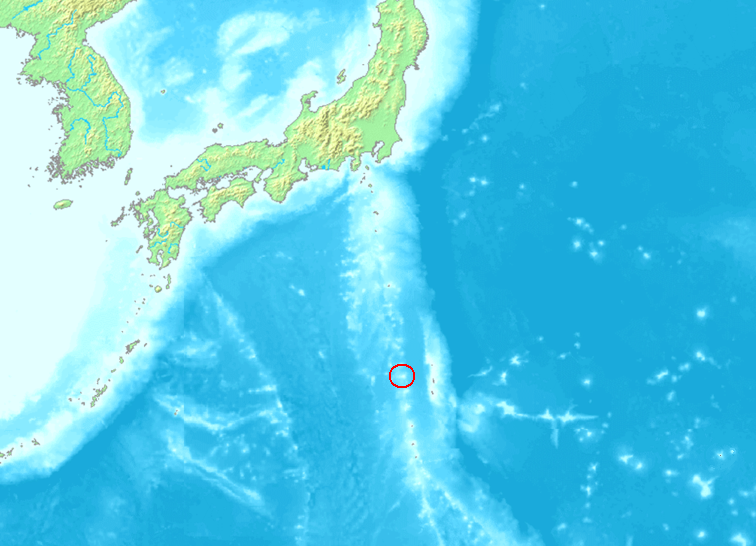

Geography
- Location: Pacific Ocean
- Coordinates: 27°14′49″N 140°52′28″E
- Archipelago: Volcano Islands
- Total islands: 1
- Area: 4.1 km^{2} (1.6 sq mi)
- Highest elevation: 200 m (700 ft)

Administration
- Japan
- Prefecture: Tokyo
- Subprefecture: Ogasawara Subprefecture
- Village: Ogasawara

Nishinoshima (Japanese: 西之島; lit. 'western island') is a volcanic island located around 940 km (584 mi) south-southeast of Tokyo that is part of the Volcano Islands arc. Nishinoshima is located about 130 km to the west of the nearest inhabited Ogasawara islands, Chichijima Island, hence the name; the other Ogasawara island groups are aligned more to the north–south. The nearest of the other Volcano Islands is over 270 km away, but Nishinoshima is on the alignment of the Volcano Islands.

It was formed by ash from an underwater volcanic eruption. Originally the above-water part of the ridge of an underwater caldera, Nishinoshima was enlarged in 1974 after eruptions created a new section of the island. Another eruption that began in November 2013 further enlarged the island and attracted worldwide attention and also made people concerned. A volcanic cone soon formed, rising to an estimated height of 142 m (466 ft) by July 2016. The eruptions ceased by November 2015, though emissions of volcanic gases continued for several months afterwards. There were further eruptions in 2017, 2018, and in 2019–2020. As of 14 August 2020, it is about 4.1 km^{2} (1.6 mi^{2}) and over 2 km (1.2 mi) in diameter and showed evidence of the return of various plants and animal species.

== Etymology ==
The island was named "Rosario Island" when it was discovered by the Spanish ship Rosario in 1702 prior to the volcanic activity. That was the island's name until 1904, when the Japanese term "Nishinoshima" (literally, "West Island") was made the official name. The new island that was formed in the 1973 eruption was called Nishinoshima Shintō (西之島新島; literally, "New Nishinoshima Island"), but due to erosion and shifting sands, that island joined the main island and ceased to be considered a separate entity.

During the early stages of the 2013 eruption, a new volcanic island was formed southeast of the original Nishinoshima. The island was not given an official name but was mentioned in Japanese reports as "new island": atarashii shima (新しい島) or shintō (新島). Government officials said the island would be named "after it is stable and it is clear it will remain". As the island has now merged with Nishinoshima, "there is little possibility it will be named as a separate entity."

== Geology ==
=== Morphology ===
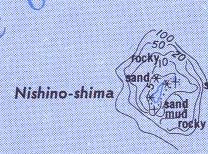
Nishinoshima before 1973

Prior to 1973, Nishinoshima was a small, green island that had no eruptions in the past 10,000 years. The island was merely the tip of an undersea volcano some 3,000 m (9,800 ft) in height and 30 km (19 mi) wide at the base. Its main period of activity was from the Late Pleistocene to the Holocene. The volcano takes the form of a caldera, with the original Nishinoshima and some nearby rocks forming part of the northwest ridge of a caldera about 1 km (0.6 mi) in diameter. The island was originally about 650 m (710 yd) long and 200 m (220 yd) wide. A 1911 survey determined the caldera was 107 m (351 ft) at its deepest.

The volcano has many large, submarine, satellite cones to the south, west, and northeast. The southern cone rises to within 196 m (643 ft) of the surface, around 9 km (6 mi) south-southeast of Nishinoshima. The island was formed by Surtseyan and Strombolian eruptions with andesitic lava that took place in 1973 and 2013. The island's surface is mostly andesitic (consisting of 58–62% SiO_{2}). The older volcanic body has been displaced by a fault running in the north–northwest–south–east direction. The crust of Nishinoshima is estimated to be 15–21 km thick.

==== 1973–1974 eruption ====
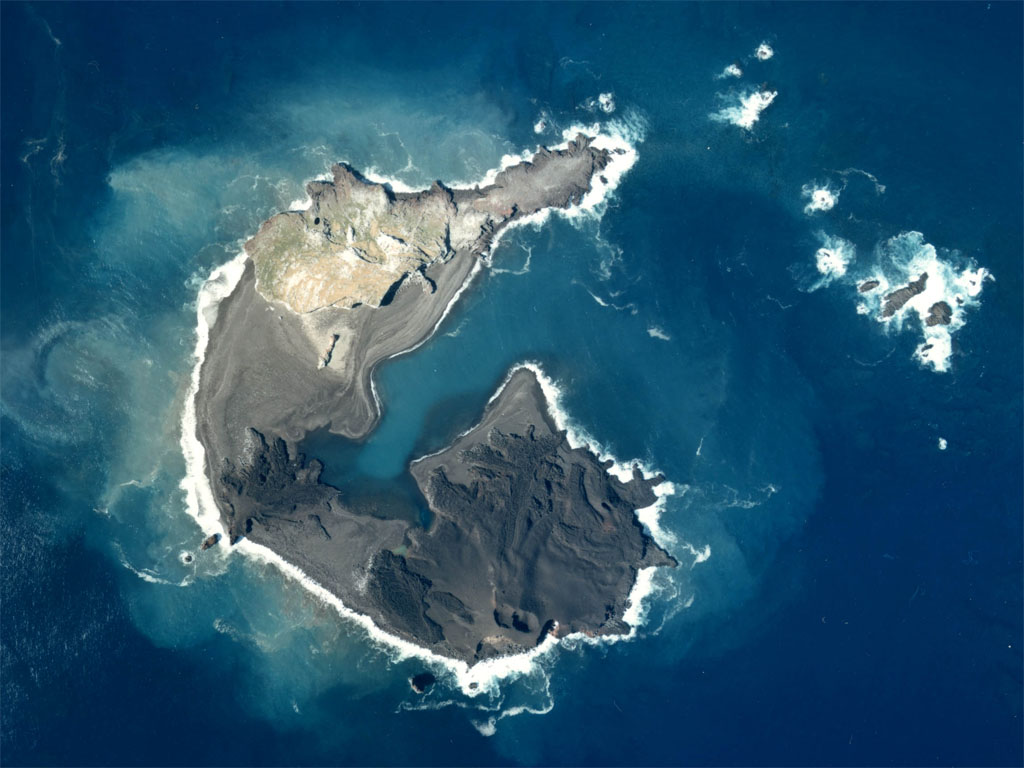
An aerial photo of Nishinoshima in 1978. The upper part of the bay is the old island, and the lower part is the new island formed by the 1973 eruption.

On 30 May 1973, the crew of a fishing boat Hirukomaru No. 2 reported to the Japan Coast Guard that, at around 11:00, white smoke rose east of the island to around 100 m (330 ft) in the air every few minutes. The Japan Coast Guard Hydrographic Department went to observe the area using a YS-11 aircraft that same day and confirmed the presence of a cloudy vent. An aerial inspection the next day said that the eruption was taking place 400 m (440 yd) east of the island. The submarine volcanic activity had been thought to have begun in early April. Yellow-green sea water and floating pumice were seen 5 km (3 mi) north of the site. Another crew discovered that two black rocks were rising from the sea. The new island's vent moved in a semicircular arc above the sea surface.

In July, the eruption continued to erupt water fountains every few minutes with white smoke rising to 100 m above sea level. An aerial inspection on 14 September noted that a new island had formed above the submarine eruption site, the island formed a cinder cone around 40 m (130 ft) high and 150 m (160 yd) across. The new island had a 70 m (77 yd) diameter crater that frequently ejected cinders to a maximum height of 300 m (980 ft). White smoke rose to a height around 1,500 m (4,900 ft) high. In November, a fissure eruption was noted on the new island with a chain of cinder cones running from southwest to northeast. The most recent cones were formed at the end of the chain, with the original cone being destroyed by the waves. The cones were erupting ash to a height of around 300 m (980 ft). On 21 December, the new island grew larger than "old" Nishinoshima. The island was 700 m (770 yd) long and 250 m (270 yd) wide; the new island had now developed a central crater that rose to a maximum height of 40 m (130 ft). The cone was continuing to eject ash and cinders to a height of 100 m (330 ft).

By February 1974, the new island had developed two cinder cones at the western end of the new island, but only the eastern cinder cone was erupting. In March, the new island was still erupting; by then, the island had five cinder cones. The total amount of eruption, including the amount below sea level, is estimated to be about 40 million tons. On 3 August 1974, the Japan Coast Guard aerial survey found the island's area to be around 316,000 m^{2} (78 acres), with the new island having an area of around 238,000 m^{2} (59 acres). From 3 August to 29 October 1974, the coastline, likely from five typhoons, retreated a maximum of 120 m (390 ft). After August 1974, the southern side of the island eroded by the water coast. From 12 November to 9 August 1976, one coastline had retreated by more than 50 m (160 ft). The bay of the island was filled with sediment due to sedimentation, later becoming a lake due to it getting closed off from the sea by sediments in 1982.

==== 2013–2015 eruption ====
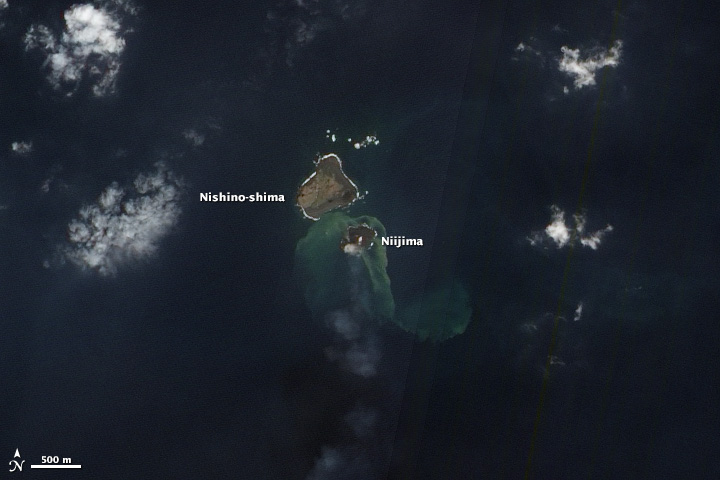
Nishinoshima as of 8 December 2013

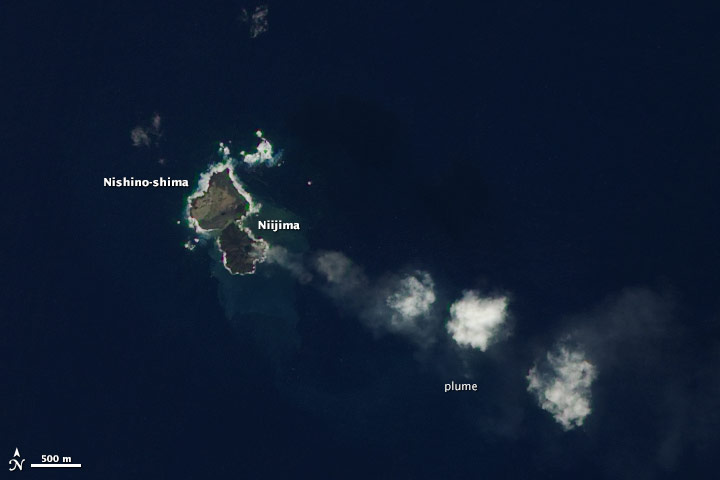
Nishinoshima as of 24 December 2013. The land from the eruption grew rapidly in less than two weeks.

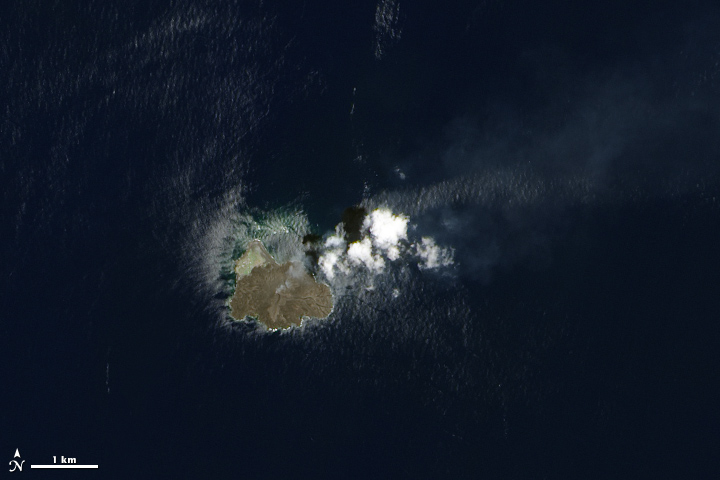
Nishinoshima as of 4 July 2014. It becomes even larger, and the relatively white old island is slightly visible.

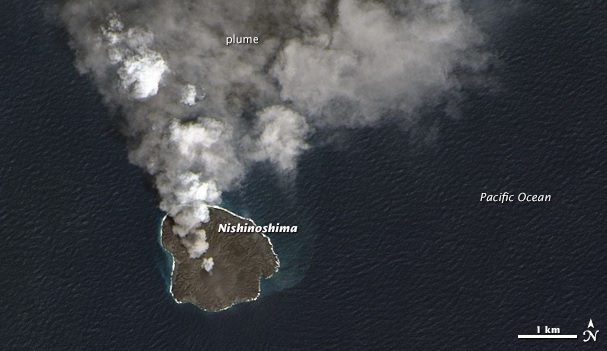
Nishinoshima as of 1 March 2015. (All are satellite images of NASA.)

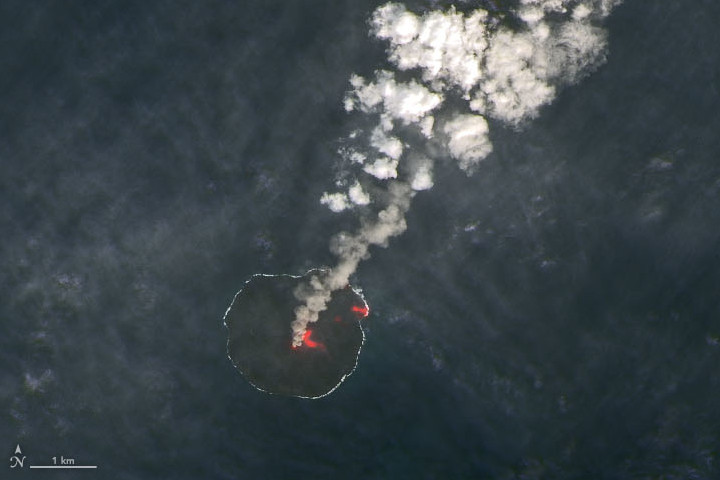
Nishinoshima as of 26 January 2020. Infrared data (red) are superimposed on a natural-color image. The remote sensing data were acquired by the Operational Land Imager (OLI) and Thermal Infrared Sensor (TIRS) aboard Landsat 8.

In November 2013, an eruption created a new small island south-southeast off the shore of the original island. By December 2013, the island rose 20–25 m (66–82 ft) above sea level, with an area of 56,000 square meters (14 acres). The island was considered large enough to maintain a presence above sea level for at least several years. By 20 December 2013, the island had grown fast enough that experts predicted that it would probably join up with Nishinoshima before the end of 2013 and cease to be a separate island. On 26 December 2013, the Japanese Coast Guard confirmed that the two islands had joined. NASA says two cones have formed around the main volcanic vents and stand more than 60 m (200 ft) above sea level. The newer portion of the island is now larger than the original Nishinoshima landmass. The merged island is slightly more than 1 km (0.6 mi) across.

During July and August 2014, lava flow increased, causing the island to expand rapidly to the east. Between September and December, the lava flow increased further and headed north, almost completely overrunning the pre-existing island, leaving only a small portion of the old island exposed. The volume of the eruption later exceeded 50 million m^{3}. On 27 December 2014, Japanese authorities said the island had reached nearly 2.3 km^{2} (570 acres) in size and is estimated to have risen to about 110 m (360 ft) above sea level and that the volcano was still active. A pyroclastic cone formed around the vents, which further rose the island to about 135 metres (443 feet) by 23 February 2015.

The eruption continued throughout the first half of 2015, and the island continued to expand. However, by August, the volcano ceased to erupt smoke and ash, but continued to emit lava. As of 16 September 2015, the total area of the island had decreased slightly, but the fumarolic zone had expanded as "vigorous volcanic activity continued without significant change". Eruptions resumed soon thereafter, but 17 November 2015 was the date of the last observed explosive eruption. Fumarolic activity continued, but decreased in amount as no new lava flows were observed. Decreases in temperatures were also recorded, and subsidence was observed near the summit of the volcano. The total surface area of the island decreased from September to November 2015 — 2.67 to 2.64 km^{2} (660 to 650 acres).

In August 2016, the Japan Meteorological Agency announced that the alert level for the volcano had been lowered, and that the no-entry zone had been reduced from a radius of 2 km (1.2 mi) to a radius of 500 m (1,600 ft). This would finally enable landings on the island. Water discoloration was still evident immediately offshore in August, indicating that volcanic activity, while in significant decline, was still present. On 14 February 2017, the Japan Meteorological Agency cancelled all alerts for the island, declaring that there was no indication of subsequent eruptions. In October 2016, a team of scientists visited Nishinoshima to conduct research on the island. Apart from documenting the island's ecology and geology, monitoring equipment was also installed for future volcanic activity.

==== 2017 and 2018 eruptions ====
On 20 April 2017, the Japan Coast Guard confirmed explosive eruptions at the No. 7 crater at Nishinoshima and lava flows emerging from the base of the volcano. Satellite imagery from 19 April also confirmed high temperatures on the island. Examination of the data revealed that the eruption likely began on 17 April. By 27 April, two lava flows had reached the sea, one on the west shore, the other on the south-west shore of the island. By 29 June, the flows had created two lobes, one extending 330 meters beyond the western shore, and other 310 to the south-west. The area of the island increased to 2.9 km^{2} (1.1 mi^{2}). By July, surface temperatures began to decrease until they became indistinguishable from the surroundings in August; lava flows also stopped by the end of August. Lava that effused onto the western and southwestern sides of the island has been characterized by its lava inflation cleft. The 2017–2018 eruptive materials are also richer in magnesium oxide (MgO) than those from 2013 to 2015.

In June 2018, the JMA announced that the no-entry zone had been reduced from a radius of 2 km (1.2 mi) to a radius of 500 m (1,600 ft). Within a month, however, the zone was returned to 1,500 m (4,900 ft) after small eruptions were spotted on 12 July 2018. On 3 October 2018, the Coordinating Committee for Prediction of Volcanic Eruptions of the Japan Meteorological Agency announced that Nishinoshima had likely ceased erupting. A 200-meter-long lava have also been observed to flow at the foot of the pyroclastic cone. These eruptions quickly subsided, and the no-entry zone was reduced back to 500 m (1,600 ft) on 31 October 2018.

==== 2019–2020 eruption ====
On 6 December 2019, the Japan Coast Guard confirmed explosive activity in Nishinoshima has returned, with new lava flows entering the sea by the following day. The conditions were enough that the Meteorological Agency issued a warning to passing ships to stay clear of Nishinoshima. Due to this eruption, some ocean bottom electromagnetic meters (OBEMs) on the seafloor went missing. One OBEM was later found on Takana beach on Iriomote Island in February 2021.

In January 2020, the Japan Coast Guard observations confirmed that lava was flowing out on the northeast coast. Further activity was observed on 4 February, and the northern extension of the island was expected. On 25 June 2020, the explosive-effusive eruption was still continuing, with lava flows on the northeastern slope of the volcano, as well as ash plumes reaching 2,600 m (8,530 ft). On 4 July, an ash plume reached 8,300 m (27,230 ft) in height. On 14 August, it reached a size of 4.1 km^{2} (1.6 mi^{2}) with a diameter over 2 km (1.2 mi). The 2019–2020 period of eruption changed from mainly andesitic lava outflow to basaltic–andesitic strombolian eruption with the characteristics of fragmentations of pyroclastic materials.

==== 2021–2023 eruption ====
On 14 August 2021, around 6 a.m., artificial satellites confirmed an eruption for the first time since late August 2020. The height of the eruption was about 1,900 m (6,230 ft). On 15 August, the Japan Coast Guard made observations by aircraft, but no eruption was confirmed. On 1 October 2022, satellite images confirmed that Nishinoshima had erupted again and continued to erupt until 12 October, when a Japan Coast Guard aircraft confirmed it was no longer erupting. The ash of the eruption reached a height of between 2.2 and 3.5 km (1.4 and 2.2 mi) on 5–11 October. Foggy weather in Fukuoka Prefecture, Japan, and Busan, South Korea, occurred from late July to early August 2020 due to the volcanic eruption of the island. The PM2.5 concentration increased 6.03 times in Fukuoka and 4.32 times in Busan.

The Japan Coast Guard reported that during an overflight of Nishinoshima on 25 January 2023, an intermittent blackish-gray plumes rising 900 m (3,000 ft) from the central part of the crater was observed with brown discolored water around the island. A small eruption at the central crater was also observed during an overflight done by the Japan Coast Guard on 4 October 2023. The ash plumes rose to 1.5 km (0.93 mi) above sea level. Satellite images from April to September 2023 showed the discoloration of the seawater and the white smoke rising. Overall, in the decade since the latest series of eruptions began, the island increased in size by around 20 times.

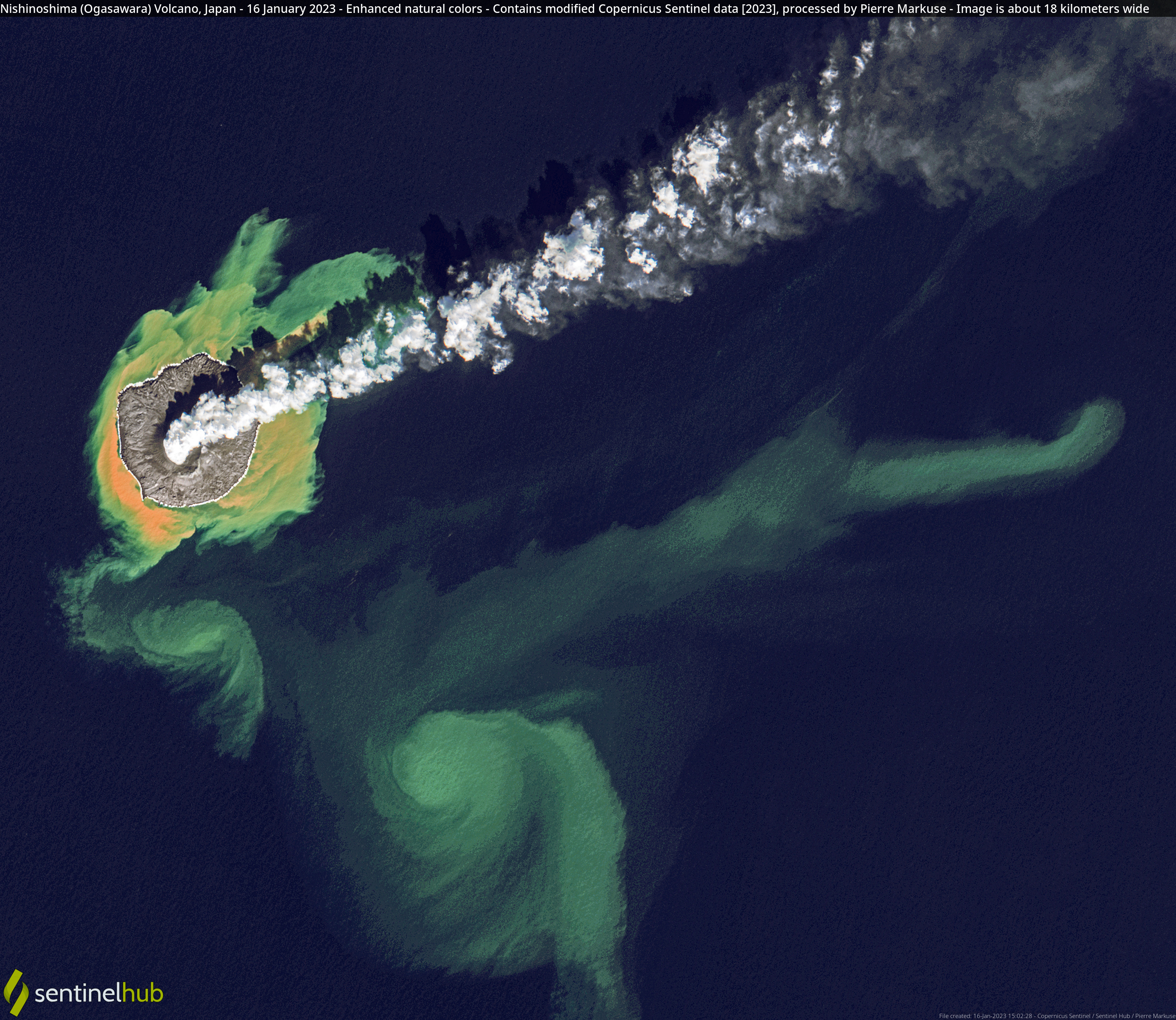
A January 2021 Sentinel-2 image of the island. The discolouration of the water around the island is due to volcanic minerals and seafloor sediment.

== Ecology ==
In 1983, four species of plants were found on the island, and a crab collection consisting of 73 species of 16 families, excluding pilumnoid and xanthoid crabs, was also documented. In 2004, short-tailed albatross, black-footed albatross, Bulweria, Puffinus pacificus, brown gannet, greater crested tern, sooty tern, and brown noddy birds were found breeding and living on the island. In 2004, 15 species of seabirds were confirmed to breed on the island. The most numerous tern species observed was the sooty tern. Boobys were the most numerous overall, with a total of about 700 nesting pairs recorded.

Since the 2013 eruption, biologists have expressed interest in how Nishinoshima would be colonized by plants and wildlife. It is expected that organic matter, mainly deposited by nesting birds in the form of feathers or excrement, would enrich the island surface for plants to grow. To prevent interference of the colonization process, researchers were also advised not to bring external species to Nishinoshima.

In October 2016, a team of scientists visited Nishinoshima to examine its environment and geologic makeup for the first time up-close. Their studies have discovered that both plant and animal life continue to exist on the remaining part of the old Nishinoshima island that had not been covered by lava. An accompanying video crew from Nippon TV captured masked boobies laying eggs and a pod of dolphins (either Indo-Pacific, Tursiops aduncus, or common bottlenose, T. truncatus) swimming off the coast. Gannets, bramblings, and earwigs were also discovered living on the island by researchers. Several cetaceans have been known to live around the island prior to the eruption, such as spinner dolphins, short-finned pilot whales, and bottlenose dolphins. Humpback whales had been seen before the eruption, and their recent returns have been confirmed as well. Insects, such as a type of carpet beetle and American cockroaches, were also discovered. In terms of flora, plants that were present on the original island, like goosegrass and purslane, were found to be growing again on the "old" section of Nishinoshima.

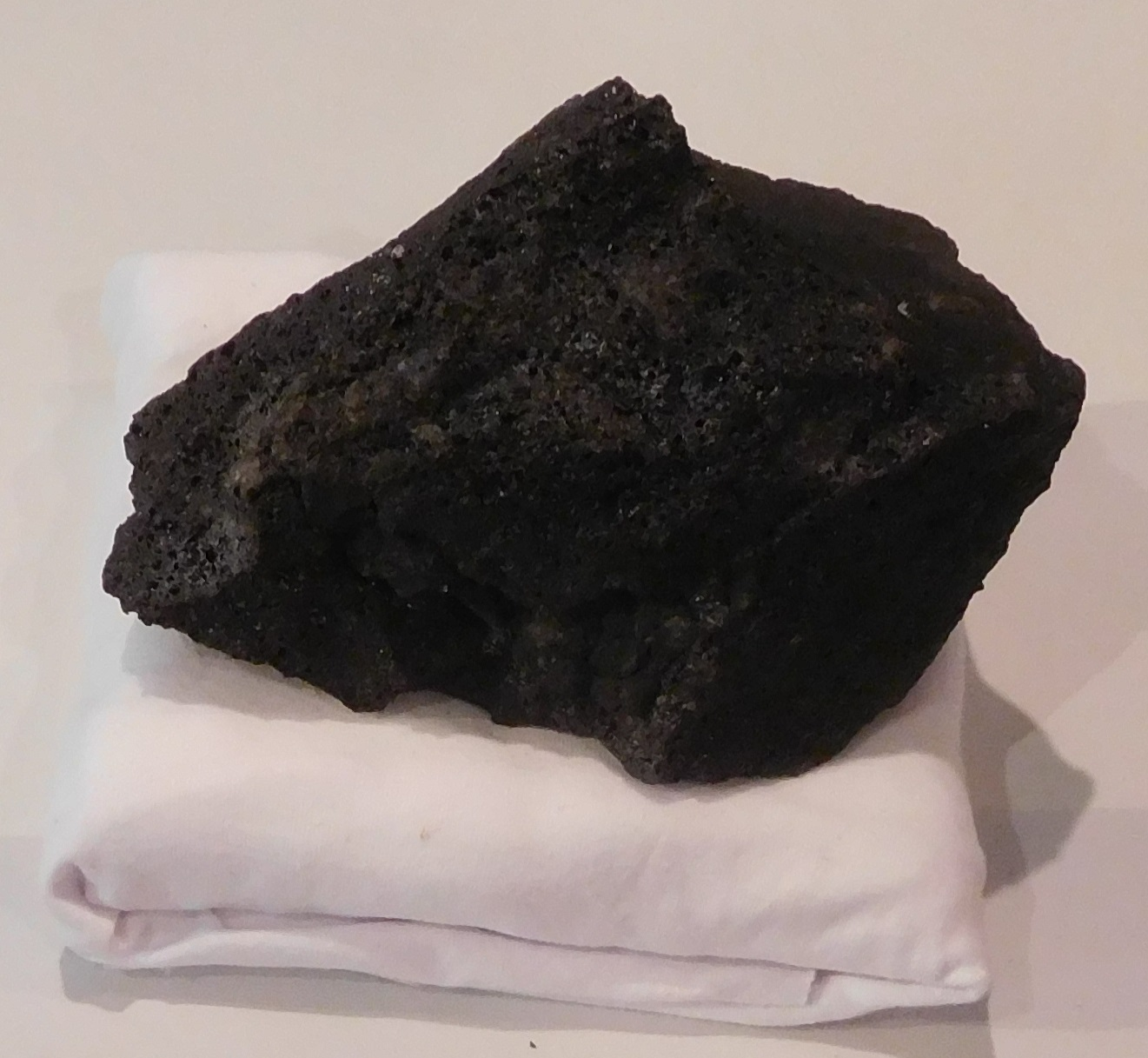
Stone of Nishinoshima (an exhibition of the Science Museum of Map and Survey)

The island and its surrounding waters have been recognised as an Important Bird Area (IBA) by BirdLife International because it supports a population of greater crested terns. A survey in September 2022 found about 30 nesting pairs of gannets on the island, down from around 150 in July 2022. The population of seabirds has also decreased overall. Five species of seabirds, including brown boobies and crested terns, have also been spotted nesting on the island. During a survey flight done by an Asahi Shimbun aircraft on 3 November 2023, a white plateau of feces left by seabirds was spotted on the island. It was reported that "The number of seabird nests observed in 2023 was about one-third of those in 2019."

== See also ==
- Surtsey, a new volcanic island that was formed in a similar manner off Iceland in 1963–1967.
- Desert island
- Lists of islands
- List of volcanoes in Japan
- List of islands in Japan
- Fukutoku-okanoba
