= Northeastern Japan Arc =

Island arc on the Pacific Ring of Fire

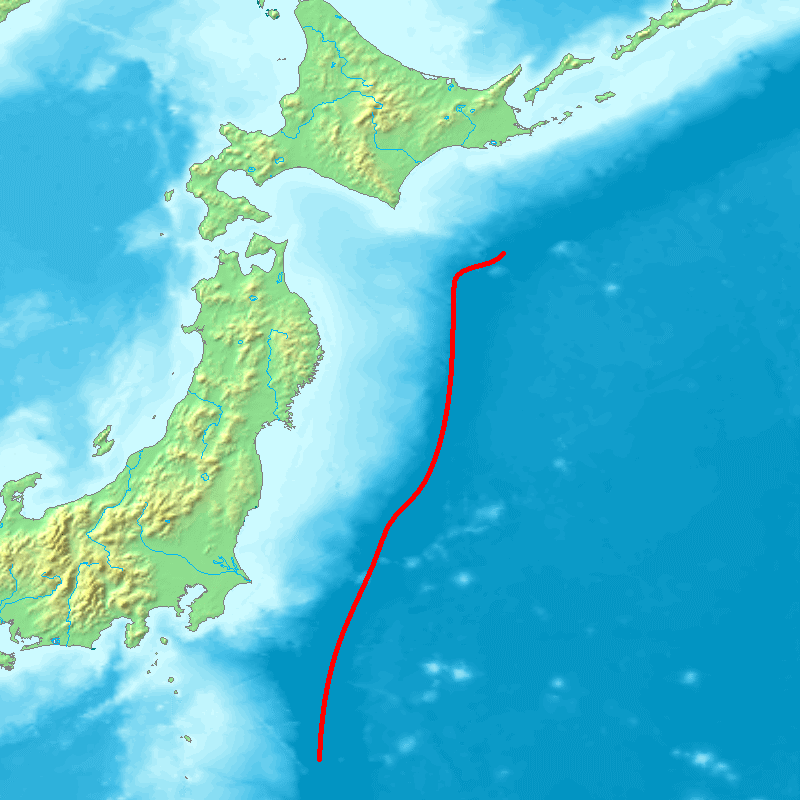
The Japan Trench, where the Pacific Plate slides beneath the Okhotsk Plate is the cause of the Northeastern Japan Arc

The Northeastern Japan Arc, also Northeastern Honshū Arc, is an island arc on the Pacific Ring of Fire. The arc runs north to south along the Tōhoku region of Honshū, Japan. It is the result of the subduction of the Pacific Plate underneath the Okhotsk Plate at the Japan Trench. The southern end of the arc converges with the Southwestern Japan Arc and the Izu–Bonin–Mariana Arc at the Fossa Magna (ja) at the east end of the Itoigawa-Shizuoka Tectonic Line (ITIL). This is the geologic border between eastern and western Honshū. Mount Fuji is at the point where these three arcs meet. To the north, the Northeastern Japan arc extends through the Oshima Peninsula of Hokkaidō. The arc converges in a collision zone with the Sakhalin Island Arc and the Kuril Island Arc in the volcanic Ishikari Mountains of central Hokkaidō. This collision formed the Teshio and Yūbari Mountains.

The Ōu Mountains form the backbone of the volcanic part of the inner arc that run from the Natsudomari Peninsula in Aomori Prefecture south to Mount Nikkō-Shirane in Tochigi and Gunma prefectures. The volcanic front consists of four north to south lines of Quaternary volcanoes and calderas, which extend the length of the range. It also includes the Quaternary volcanoes of southwestern Hokkaido. The Dewa Mountains and the Iide Mountains are non-volcanic uplift ranges that run parallel to the west of the Ōu Mountains.

The outer arc ranges are the Kitakami and the Abukuma Mountains. These mountains are made from pre-tertiary rock. The mountains rose in the Cenozoic and have since been worn smooth by erosion.
