= List of volcanoes in Mexico =

Volcanoes in Mexico form a significant part of the country's geological landscape, with numerous active and extinct volcanoes primarily located along the central-southern Trans-Mexican Volcanic Belt. The diverse array of volcanic features in Mexico includes stratovolcanoes, shield volcanoes, cinder cones, lava domes, and calderas.

Many of Mexico's volcanoes are part of the Pacific Ring of Fire, a region characterized by frequent earthquakes and volcanic eruptions. Notable volcanoes include Popocatépetl, one of the country's most active and dangerous volcanoes, Pico de Orizaba (Citlaltépetl), the highest peak in Mexico, and Parícutin, a cinder cone volcano that famously emerged from a cornfield in 1943. Volcanoes play a significant role in Mexico's geography, climate, and culture, influencing local ecosystems, agriculture, and human settlements. The volcanic activity also poses hazards to surrounding communities, necessitating ongoing monitoring and disaster preparedness efforts.

== Types of volcanoes ==
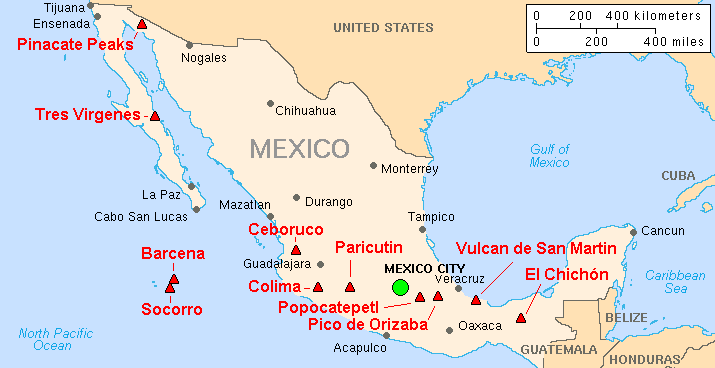
Major volcanoes of Mexico (minor volcanoes not shown)

Mexican volcanoes include cinder cone, composite, shield, and lava dome types, each forming in its own way. Cinder cone volcanoes are the simplest, forming from lava ejected from a single vent, which separates and solidifies into small fragments around the central vent to form an oval cone.

Composite or stratovolcanoes form some of the world’s most memorable mountains: Mount Rainier, Mount Fuji, and Mount Cotopaxi. These volcanoes are very steep sided and symmetrical cones produced by a conduit system channeling magma from deep in the Earth. They have many vents for escaping magma and grow up to thousands of meters tall. Composite volcanoes are also known to erupt violently, such as the Mount St. Helens eruption of 1980.

Shield volcanoes are very large and look like shields from above, formed by repeated thin layers of lava pouring out in all directions from a central summit vent.

Lava dome volcanoes contain accumulations of lava too viscous to flow far down the slope. They commonly occur within the crators of large composite volcanoes. The accumulated lava may explode, releasing huge amounts of ash and rock.

== Trans-Mexican Volcanic Belt ==
The Trans-Mexican Volcanic Belt is the Neogene volcanic arc along the southern edge of the North American plate, approximately 1000 kilometers long, overlying the Rivera and Cocos slabs. Uniquely, it is not parallel to the Middle American trench, where most stratovolcanoes are located. It has a wide range of chemical compositions, such as intraplate, and includes monogenetic volcano cones, shield volcanoes, lava domes, complexes, and major calderas. Some of the highest peaks are snow-covered year round. The Trans-Mexican Belt formed out of the Sierra Madre Occidental belt, as the Rivera plate begin to subduct beneath Central Mexico in the early to late Miocene. A slab tear propagating west to east across the back northern area of the belt generated asthenospheric heat in a mafic episode. At the end of the Miocene, flat slab subduction generated more silic volcanoes and pushed the belt further north. During the late Pliocene to Holocene, slab rollback moved the volcanic arc toward the trench to its present position.

== List ==
This is a list of active and extinct volcanoes in Mexico.

Name	Elevation (m)	Elevation (ft)	Location	Last eruption	Volcanic type
Los Atlixcos	800	2625	19.809°N 96.526°W	—	Shield
Acatlán Volcanic Field	1990	6529	20.45°N 103.57°W	Pleistocene	Caldera
Volcán Bárcena	332	1089	19.30°N 110.82°W	1953	Cinder
Ceboruco	2280	7480	21.125°N 104.508°W	1875	Composite
Cerro Prieto	223	732	32.418°N 115.305°W	Holocene	Composite
Sierra Chichinautzin	3930	12,894	19.08°N 99.13°W	400 CE	Shield
El Chichón	1060	3478	17.33°N 93.20°W	1982	Composite
Cofre de Perote	4282	14,049	19.492°N 97.15°W	1150	Shield
Colima	4330	14,306	19.51°N 103.62°W	2019	Composite
Comondú-La Purísima	780	2559	26.00°N 111.92°W	—	Cinder
Coronado	440	1444	29.08°N 113.513°W	—	Composite
Las Cumbres	3940	12,926	19.15°N 97.27°W	3920 BCE ± 50	Composite
Las Derrumbadas	3480	11,417	19.20°N 97.30°W	—	Composite
Durango volcanic field	2075	6808	24.15°N 104.43°W	—	Composite
La Gloria Volcanic Field	3600	11,483	19.33°N 97.25°W	—	Composite
Guadalupe	1100	3609	29.07°N 118.28°W	—	Shield
Los Humeros	3150	10,335	19.68°N 97.45°W	4470 BCE	Composite
Iztaccihuatl	5286	17,342	19.2°N 98.6°W	Holocene	Composite
Jaraguay volcanic field	960	3150	29.33°N 114.50°W	Holocene	Composite
Jocotitlán	3910	12,828	19.724°N 99.757°W	1270 ± 75	Composite
El Jorullo	3170	10,397	19.48°N 102.25°W	1774	Cinder
La Malinche	4461	14,636	19.23°N 98.03°W	1170 BCE ± 50	Composite
Mascota Volcanic Field	2540	8399	20.62°N 104.83°W	Holocene	Cinder
Michoacán–Guanajuato volcanic field	3860	12,664	19.48°N 102.25°W	1952	Cinder
Moctezuma volcanic field			29.63°N 109.52°W	530,000 ± 200,000	Composite
Naolinco Volcanic Field	2000	6562	19.67°N 96.75°W	1200 BCE	Cinder
Nevado de Toluca	4690	15,354	19.108°N 99.758°W	1350 BCE	Composite
Papayo	3600	11,811	19.308°N 98.70°W	Holocene	Composite
Parícutin	2800	9,186	19.5°N 102.2°W	1952	Cinder
Pico de Orizaba (Citlaltépetl)	5,636	18,491	19.017°N 97.27°W	1846	Composite
Pinacate Peaks	1200	3937	31.772°N 113.498°W	—	Composite
Popocatépetl	5426	17,802	19.023°N 98.622°W	2024	Composite
Sierra la Primavera	2270	7448	20.62°N 103.52°W	Pleistocene	Composite
La Reforma Caldera		-	27.508°N 112.392°W	—	Composite
San Borja volcanic field	1360	4462	28.50°N 113.75°W	Holocene	Cinder
Isla San Luis	180	591	29.814°N 114.384°W	Holocene	Shield
San Martin Tuxtla	1650	5413	18.57°N 95.320°W	1796	Shield
San Quintín Volcanic Field	260	853	30.468°N 115.996°W	Holocene	Shield
Sangangüey	2353	7677	21.45°N 104.73°W	1742	Composite
Serdan-Oriental	3485	11,434	19.27°N 97.47°W	Holocene	Composite
Socorro	1050	3445	18.78°N 110.95°W	1994	Shield
Tacaná	4060	13,320	15.13°N 92.11°W	1986	Composite
Tequila Volcano	2920	9,580	20.79°N 103.85°W	Pleistocene	Composite
Isla Tortuga	210	689	27.392°N 111.858°W	Holocene	Shield
Tres Virgenes	1940	6365	27.42°N 112.59°W	1857	Composite
Zitacuaro-Valle de Bravo	3500	11,483	19.40°N 100.25°W	3050 BCE	Composite

== Volcanic hazards ==
A volcanic hazard is a process that can cause damage to anything or anyone. Tephra/ash is a hazard caused by many volcanoes. Ash covers items like buildings, vehicles, homes, etc., and if "animals or humans consume fine-grained ash, it can cause health problems.." Lahars are a kind of flowing volcanic hazard that can be harmful as they can take/drag anything in their way. Lahars can flow at varying speeds, making it difficult for people to escape from them. Pyroclastic flows, which are toxic gases created by hot clouds that can destroy all things they come into contact with, are another example of a volcanic hazard. Lava flows are the least deadly out of the volcanic hazards as "most move slowly enough that people can move out the way easily." However, objects, people, and more that go near the lava flows "will be knocked over, surrounded, buried, or ignited by the extremely hot temperature of lava."

== Ring of Fire ==
A lot of earthquakes and volcanoes are in the pacific ring of fire. In addition, the ring of fire is “a direct result of plate tectonics, and the movement and collisions of lithospheric plates" and Mexico’s volcanoes are part of this ring of fire. A specific Mexican volcano apart from the ring of fire is Popocatépetl, which is also one of the most dangerous volcanoes. This volcano lies “on the Trans-Mexican Volcanic Belt, which is the result of the small Cocos Plate sub-ducting beneath the North American Plate”. The Popocatépetl volcano is a danger to a lot of people, so they have to be careful when or if this volcano erupts. In general, Mexico’s volcanoes are in the ring of fire, therefore people who live near the volcanoes listed above have to be careful with the volcanoes that will most likely erupt again.

== Effects of volcanic eruptions on surrounding communities ==
When a volcano erupts, the communities around them are affected depending on how big of an eruption occurred. Popocatépetl is an excellent example of the effects that volcanoes can have on a community. Popocatépetl is a famous volcano due to it being inactive for 50 years and coming back to life in 1994. Since 1994, it has been producing powerful explosions at irregular intervals. Over a period of several days of eruptions in 2013, it released a cloud of ash that would spew 2 miles high. In the city of San Pedro Nexapa, about 9.5 km (5.9 mi) from Popocatépetl, local residents were able to find small piles of ash on parts of the sidewalk. It is easy for ash to get picked up by the wind, and get passed around contaminating the air. Cars driving by pick up the ash with their exhaust, and with the volcano still erupting irregularly, ash is periodically being ejected. Following the explosions, a total of 17 flights were canceled “due to climate conditions and in accordance with their own international policies.” Other effects that volcanoes can have on communities in close proximity with the base are increased risk for ash clouds, mud flow, gases, earthquakes, and tsunamis. “During volcanic eruptions and their immediate aftermath, increased respiratory system morbidity has been observed as well as mortality among those affected by volcanic eruptions.”

== Impact on tree growth ==
Environmental effects on growth and survival of trees in Mexico from volcanic activity are significant. Using evidence from the effects of the 1855 - 1856 eruption of that Tacaná volcano and ash fall from the 1902 eruption of the Santa Maria volcano and the radial growth of trees at Tacaná. Because of these incidents, they caused two significant suppression events to happen. The first event took place from 1857 to 1868 which caused by the historic eruption of Tacaná, two years prior. A year later after the eruption of the Santa Maria volcano, the second suppression event started from 1903 to 1908, during which tree growth was affected by the thickness of ash fall from the eruption and deposited near each tree. Another example that the impact of volcano eruptions on forest ecosystems can be the 1913 Plinian eruption of Volćan de Fuego, 7.7 km to the south. This event was one of the largest explosive eruptions in Mexico and produced ash flow deposits up to 40 m thick. Also, this indicated extremely low growth in 1913 and 1914, radio growth reduction was over 30% in 75% of the sampled trees.

== See also ==
- Central America Volcanic Arc
- Trans-Mexican Volcanic Belt
- List of volcanoes in Guatemala
- List of volcanoes in the United States
