= List of volcanoes in Madagascar =

This is a list of active and extinct volcanoes in Madagascar.

Name	Elevation		Location	Last eruption
Name	meters	feet	Coordinates	Last eruption
Ambre-Bobaomby	1475	4839	12.60°S 49.15°E	Holocene
Ankaizina volcanic field	2878	9442	14.30°S 48.67°E	Holocene
Ankaratra Field	2644	8674	19.40°S 47.20°E	Holocene
Itasy volcanic field	1800	5905	19.00°S 46.77°E	6050 BC
Nosy-Be	214	702	13.32°S 48.48°E	Holocene
