= Cat Hills volcanic field =

Volcanic field in New Mexico, US

Cat Hills volcanic Field
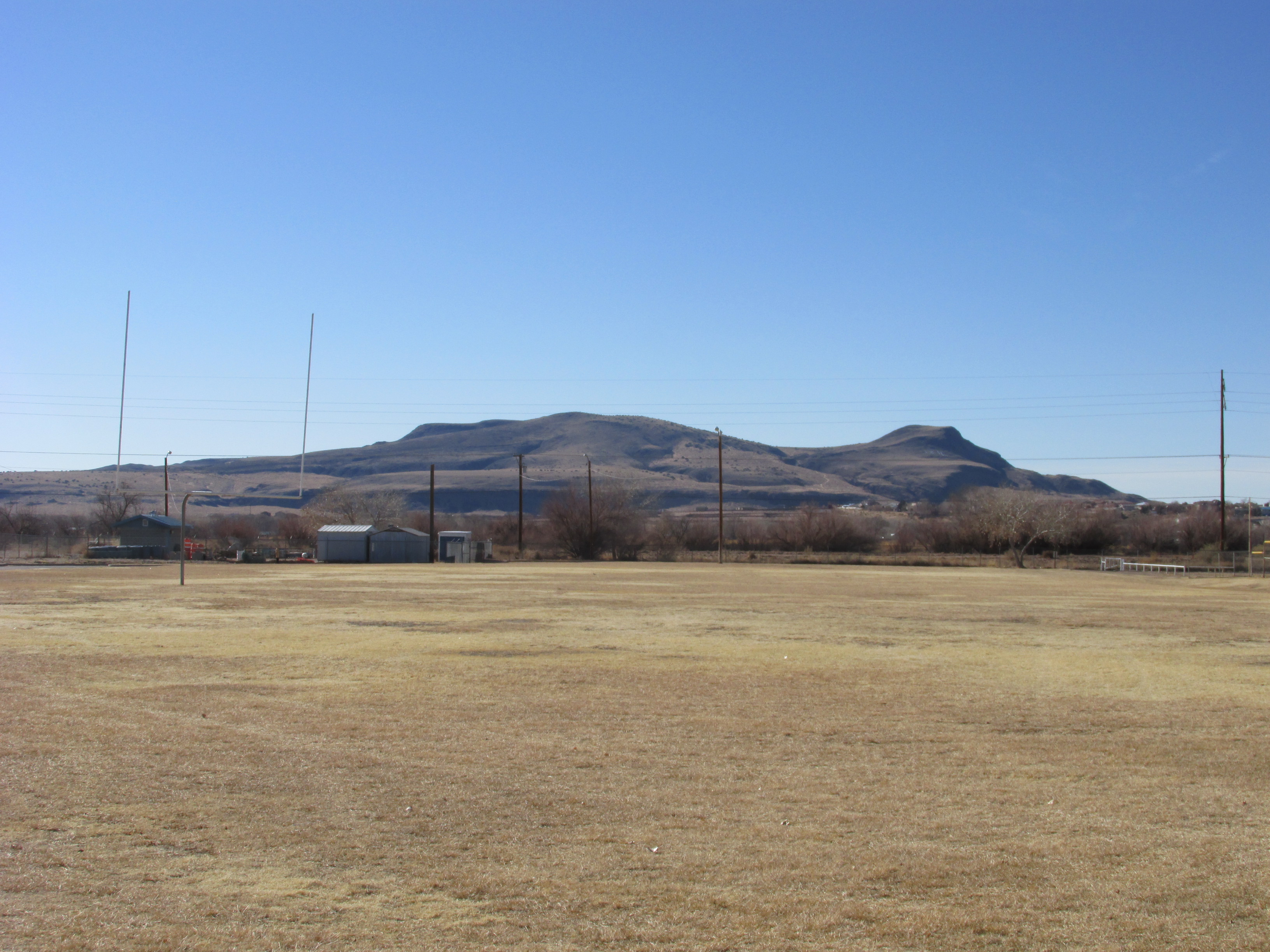
- Los Lunas volcano

Highest point
- Elevation: 1,750 m (5,740 ft)
- Coordinates: 34.83°N 106.83°W

Geography
- Location: New Mexico, United States

Geology
- Mountain type: volcanic field
- Volcanic zone: Rio Grande Rift
- Last eruption: c. 140,000 years ago

Cat Hills volcanic field is a monogenetic volcanic field located in New Mexico, US.

== Description ==
The field consists of the Cat Hills cones and flows, Wind Mesa, and Isleta volcano and Los Lunas volcano. These are located in close proximity to each other, but show a diversity of compositions and ages.

The oldest volcano of the field is Isleta volcano, which is located about 2 miles (3.2 km) west of Isleta Pueblo. I-25 crosses its eastern flank. The volcano has a K-Ar age of 2.78 Ma. Isleta volcano is a cone built over a maar, and consists of alkali olivine basalt.

Los Lunas volcano is located on the eastern escarpment of Ceja Mesa, about 4 miles (6.4 km) west of Los Lunas. It shows evidence that flows cascaded from the vent down the escarpment, showing that the volcano is younger than the escarpment. The lavas have been dated at 1.1 to 1.3 Ma based on K-Ar dating, which constrains the age of the Ceja surface and the Ceja Formation. The position on the escarpment means that the peak is imposing viewed from the east (with an apparent topographic prominence of 1,100 feet (340 m)) but much less so viewed from the west, where the apparent topographic prominence is just 250 feet (76 m). The volcano is composed of andesite erupted from two closely spaced vents.

The youngest volcanoes of the field are the Cat Hills themselves, which form a chain of 23 cinder cones following a hidden fissure that strikes just east of north. The fissure also erupted extensive flows, covering an area of about 26 square miles (67 km^{2}). The cinder cones range in size from 500 feet (150 m) in diameter and 70 feet (21 m) tall to 100 feet (30 m) in diameter and 20 feet (6.1 m) tall. All show summit craters and are obviously young. They have been mined extensively for cinder, with one cone quarried completely away by 1978. K-Ar dating gives an age of 0.14 Ma. All are composed of alkali olivine basalt similar to that of Isleta volcano.

Wind Mesa is undated but seems to lie just east of the same fissure zone as the Cat Hills and about 6 miles (9.7 km) west of Isleta volcano. The mesa is truncated by faults on both the west and east sides, and is composed of an olivine-bearing basaltic andesite.

== Notable vents ==
Name	Elevation	Coordinates	Last eruption
Isleta volcano	5,387 ft (1,642 m)	34.919°N 106.728°W	2.78 Ma
Wind Mesa	200 ft (61 m)	34.928°N 106.848°W	-
Los Lunas volcano	5,955 ft (1,815 m)	34.799°N 106.797°W	1.1-1.3 Ma

== See also ==
- List of volcanoes in the United States
- List of volcanic fields
