= Crater Basalt volcanic field =

Volcanic field in Argentina

Coordinates: 42.02°S 70.18°W

Crater Basalt volcanic field is a volcanic field in Argentina.

The field in the Chubut province covers a surface area of 700 square kilometres (270 sq mi) and a width of 60 kilometres (37 mi). It presents nine monogenetic volcanoes and several shield volcanoes that have merged to form volcanic plateaus. The tallest of these cones, Antitruz 1, is 88 metres (289 ft) high. Major cones in the field are Cerro Contreras, Cerro Fermín, Cerro Negro, Cerro Ventana, Cerro Volcán and Pinchuleu. Of these Cerro Negro is the highest with 1,344 metres (4,409 ft) altitude.

The field's products include lava and tephra. In total 26 cones and 9 eruptive centres have generated 2.3 cubic kilometres (0.55 cu mi) of eruption products. Volcanic cones are formed from spatter, which was still hot and liquid when falling down and fused together to form erosion-resistant spatter cones. Lava flows in the area are pahoehoe that formed lava tubes, lava tumuli and "whaleback" structures. They are between 1–10 metres (3 ft 3 in – 32 ft 10 in) thick. Cerro Fermín alone is the origin of six lava flows.

Being 300 kilometres (190 mi) east of the main arc and beyond the edge of the Nazca Plate slab, it is part of the back-arc of the Andean Southern Volcanic Zone. The position next to the slab edge may be responsible for its existence. The Southern Volcanic Zone is formed by the subduction of the Nazca Plate beneath the South America plate at a pace of 9 centimetres per year (3.5 in/year) in the Peru-Chile Trench, 400 kilometres (250 mi) west of Crater Basalt. It developed within the 30 kilometres (19 mi) wide Gastre graben that also contains salt pans. This graben is part of a major fault system that extends from the Atlantic Ocean to the Pacific. Northeast of the field lies the Somuncura basaltic field of Oligocene-Miocene age and uncertain origin.

It was active between 600 and 340 ka. Three stages of activity have been identified, one 1 mya, the second 0.6 mya and the third 0.3 mya. Activity has migrated eastward during time. Other estimates indicate Holocene activity, supported by stratigraphic relationships of Cerro Ventana and Cerro Contreras lava flows with nearby river sediments. The Holocene Tagua ash (<2712–2360 BP) may originate from the Crater Basalt volcanic field but there are geographical and petrological problems with this theory. There may be present-day thermal anomalies at the volcano. In terms of hazard level, Crater Basalt volcanic field has been rated 35th out of 38 Argentinian volcanoes.

The shield volcanoes have formed basalt as eruption products. Crater Basalt basalts include basanite and trachybasalts. Incompatible elements and rare-earth elements are enriched in these lavas. The volcanic rocks are derived from decompression melting of the asthenosphere, with garnet and lherzolite as precursors. Dunite xenoliths are found within the erupted basalts.

== See also ==
- List of volcanic fields
