= San Felipe volcanic field =

Volcanic field in northern New Mexico, USA

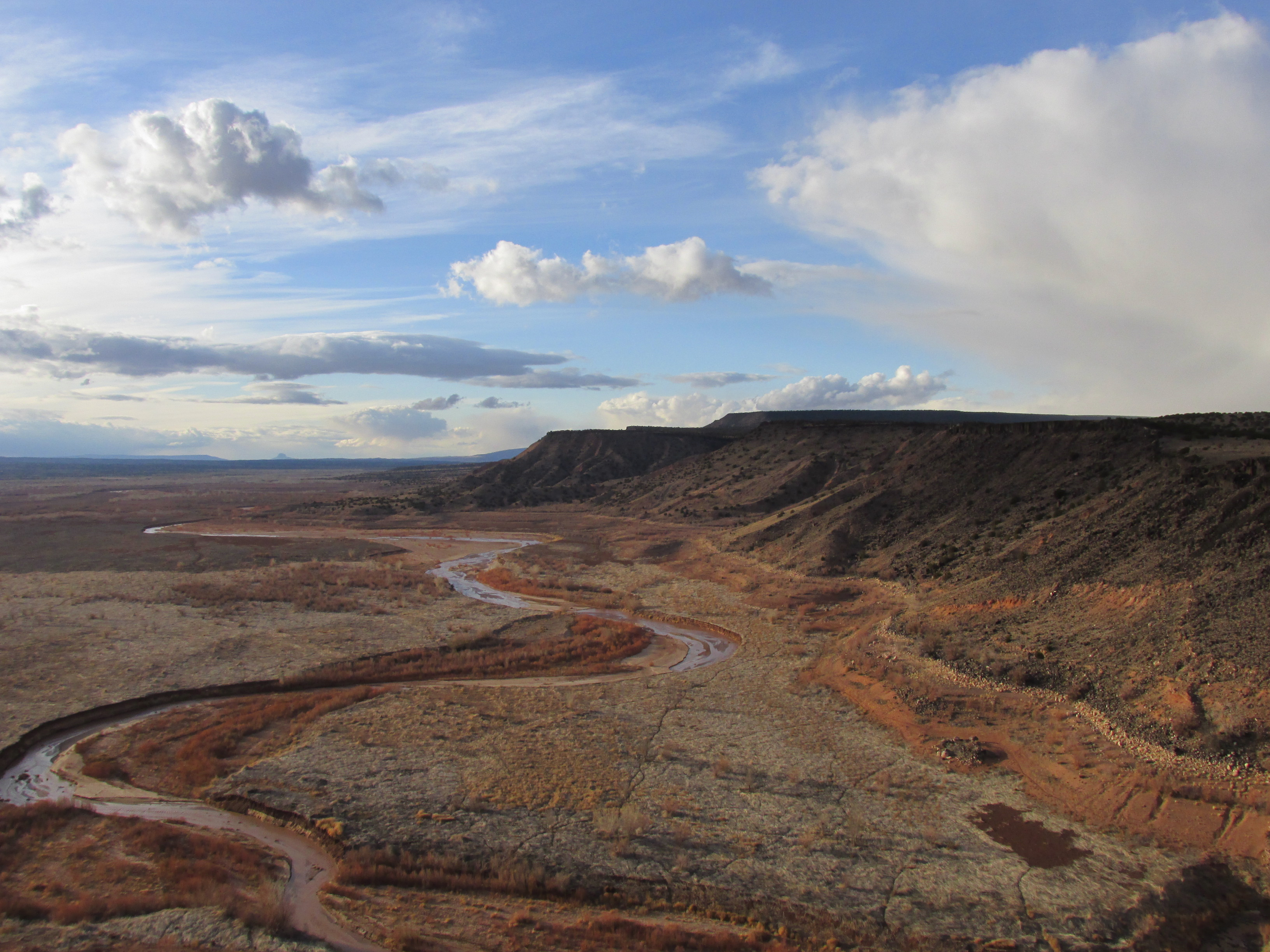
- Jemez River at the south end of the volcanic field

Highest point
- Elevation: 1,585 to 1,950 meters (5,200 to 6,398 ft)
- Coordinates: 35.5°N 106.5°W

Geography
- Location: New Mexico, United States

Geology
- Rock age: 2.5 million years
- Mountain type: Volcanic field
- Volcanic zone: Rio Grande Rift

San Felipe volcanic field (Eastern Keres: Tyiti Tzatya; also known as the Santa Ana Mesa field) is a monogenetic volcanic field located just north of the confluence of the Jemez River and the Rio Grande in New Mexico, United States.

== Description ==
The volcanic field consists of tholeiitic basalt lava flows, most of which were erupted from fissures and vents aligned from north to south. The largest of these fissures built up the San Felipe shield volcano, which has an elevation of 6,434 feet (1,961 m) and rises 800 feet (240 m) above the base of the lava flows. The flows themselves cover an area of about 38 square miles (98 km^{2}), which was fairly flat ground 2.5 million years ago when the eruptions took place. Erosion has since lowered the surrounding terrain and eroded the edges of the field, which now stands as a high mesa, with the basalt cap standing as much as 1,000 feet (300 m) above the Jemez River.

In addition to San Felipe volcano, three other major eruption centers and 66 cinder cones have been identified in the field. The cinder cones are aligned close to north-south faults, which show displacements of up to 350 feet (110 m). The cinder cones are unusual in being eroded nearly flat or even appearing as shallow craters on the flow surfaces. This is attributed to the nearby rivers meandering across the flows after the cinder cones erupted, but before regional uplift raised the field above river level. Some of the cinder cones show ring dikes. Small dikes and plugs are found across the field that are attributed to a late stage of eruption.

== Notable Vents ==
Name	Elevation	Location	Last eruption
Canjilon Hill	1,615 meters (5,299 ft)	35.361°N 106.538°W	-
San Felipe Peak	1,961 meters (6,434 ft)	35.471°N 106.492°W	2.5 Mya

== See also ==
- List of volcanoes in the United States
- List of volcanic fields
