= Pleiku-Bantour volcanic field =

Volcanic field in Vietnam

- Location within Vietnam

Highest point
- Elevation: 1,028 m (3,373 ft)
- Coordinates: 13.85°N 108.1°E

The Pleiku-Bantour volcanic field is an extensive volcanic field in southern Vietnam. It contains several volcanic edifices, most of which are not well-presevered. In 1973, the International Association of Volcanology and Chemistry of the Earth's Interior listed this volcanic area as Pleistocene in age. The southern extension of the Pleiku-Bantour volcanic field is the Darlac volcanic field which is also of Pleistocene age.

== Volcanoes ==
The Pleiku-Bantour volcanic field includes the following volcanoes:

Name	Landform	Coordinates
Mount Chi-Hodron (Chi-Haedrong)	Crater	13°54′N 108°0′E
Mount Chi-Holam	Cone	13°52′N 108°5′E
Mount Chi-Ten	Crater	13°57′N 108°5′E
Mount La Bang	Crater	13°54′N 108°2′E
Mount Pleiku	Crater	14°0′N 108°0′E
Mount Pleitott	Cone	13°46′N 108°2′E
Plei-Monu	Crater	14°0′N 108°2′E

== See also ==
- List of volcanic fields
