= El Toro volcanic field =

Volcanic field in Argentina

El Toro volcanic field is part of the Central Volcanic Zone of the Andes in the northern Puna of Argentina. Three of the cones in the volcanic field are located southwest of the town of El Toro and the fourth is found north. Part of a field of monogenetic volcanoes associated with subduction of the Nazca Plate beneath the South American Plate, it is constructed from three main cones and an additional lava flow. The field formed between six and two million years ago.

== Geological background ==
El Toro belongs to a formation of monogenetic volcanism, which in this part of the Central Volcanic Zone of the Andes is less well studied than the large volume dacitic eruptions that took place in this area. All these volcanic phenomena are linked to the subduction of the Nazca Plate beneath the South American Plate. Major north-south lineaments are also found in the area as well as other minor lineaments which may play a role in the magma supply.

The basement in the El Toro area consists of an Ordovician sedimentary layer with Paleogene-Miocene arenites. Likewise, Cretaceous sedimentary layers are found in the area. The Vizcachera Formation which underpins the volcanic field is of Eocene-Miocene age, while the volcanoclastic and sedimentary Filo Blanco sequence was formed 10.8–8.8 mya ago. The latter is of fluvial origin and also contains an ignimbrite layer.

There is a noticeable difference between the northern and southern Puna in terms of the existence of mafic volcanism, which is much more widespread in the southern Puna. Possibly, during the Miocene and Pliocene a molten layer existed within the 50–70 kilometres (31–43 mi) thick crust of the northern Puna. This layer would constitute a density barrier to the rise of mafic magma.

== Geology of the field ==
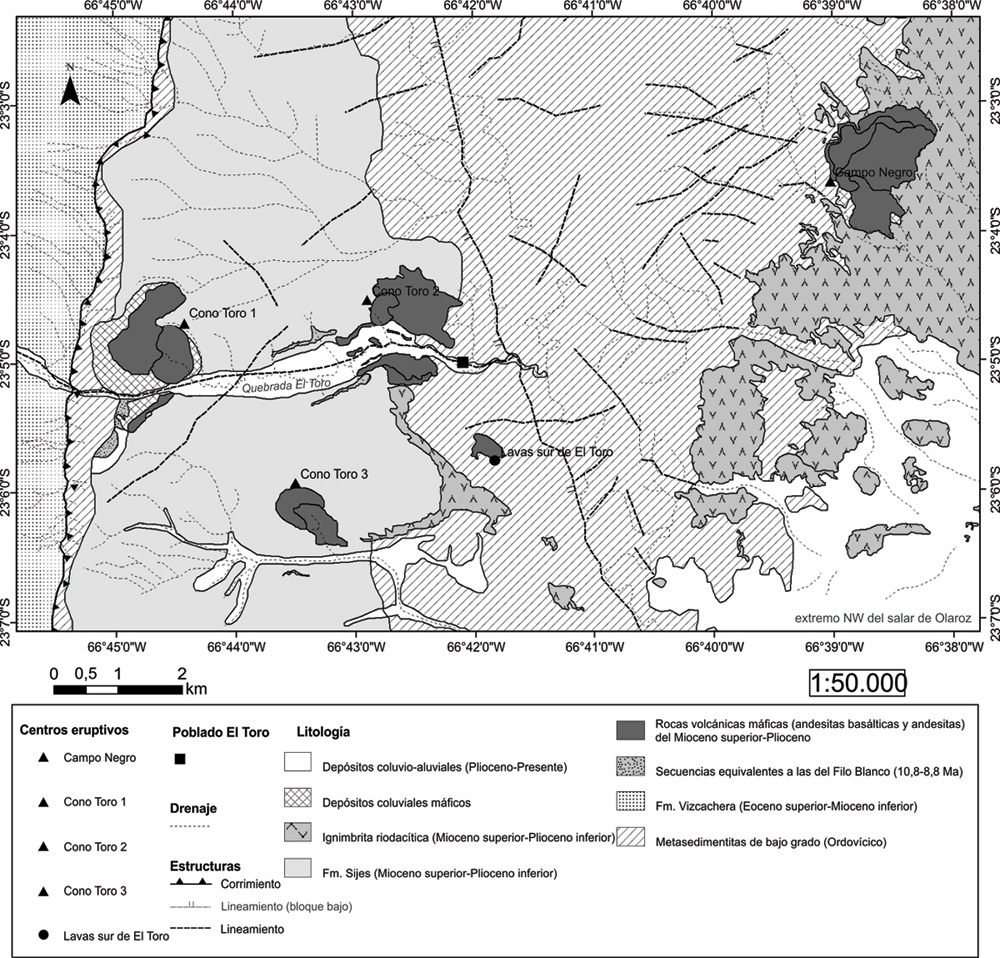
Geological map of the El Toro volcanic field

There are four different volcanoes in the field, Toro 1 (23°05′26″S 66°44′51″W), Toro 2, Toro 3 and Campo Negro. They are mostly heavily eroded. The construction of two of the edifices was influenced by local lineaments which intersect in the area. Dimensions range from 600 metres (2,000 ft) of width at the base and 110 metres (360 ft) of height for Toro 1 and 150 metres (490 ft) of width at the base and 20 metres (66 ft) for Campo Negro. These cones were all formed by strombolianic activity with distinct eruption pulses.

All these cones were breached by lava flows, which in most cones extend east and southeast of the cone. Toro 1, which also appears to be cut by a small WNW-trending structure, was breached to the west instead. Lapilli, lava bombs and scoria are also found at the cones. Large lava bombs, including some with tabular shapes, are found on Toro 1 and Toro 2. Both of the latter cones also feature dykes. The Campo Negro cone is dominated by the surrounding lava flows.

These breaches form lava fields with a full surface area of 3.87 square kilometres (1.49 sq mi). Two major and several minor lava flows are found at Toro 1, at least two superposed ones at Toro 2 and Toro 3, and four flows are found at Campo Negro. There is also an isolated andesitic lava flow (23°05′36″S 66°41′58″W) not associated with any cone and richer in xenoliths that is evidently unrelated to the closest flows from the cones proper. All these lavas have little recognizable surface features. Thicknesses range from 3–4 metres (9.8–13.1 ft) to 20 metres (66 ft) and lengths from <100 metres (330 ft) to >1.4 kilometres (0.87 mi) at one Campo Negro flow. Blocks and mounds of pyroclastics are found on some of the lava flows, some of these mounds contain small dykes. They most likely are rafted pyroclastics rather than separate vents.

=== Petrology and facies ===
There are three different rock facies in the El Toro volcanic field. The first encompasses a loose rock-breccia association with lapilli. It consists mostly of medium-sized fragments (1–6 centimetres (0.39–2.36 in)) and they form roughly stratified deposits. Average diameter of fragments decreases with increasing distance from the volcanoes. There are two types of lava bombs in the field, a more common type with flow shapes and deformation resulting from ground impact, and a type on Toro 1 and Toro 2 which are denser and more rounded. These cones also have some tabular rocks. Lava bombs may have formed from lava lakes in the cones or from colder remnant magma.

The second facies are partially welded pyroclastic rocks with fiammes which form deposits 3–6 metres (9.8–19.7 ft) thick. There are vertical variations in the grade of welding, some are only barely distinguishable from a lava flow except by the presence of clear edges around some clasts. Fiammes have brighter colours than the underlying rock matrix. Scoria layers at Toro 1 have thicknesses of 17–30 metres (56–98 ft). A third facies is also present at Toro 1 and consists of tuffs with lapilli. These layers have red-orange-brown colours and contain some palagonite. These tuffs lie directly on the basement rocks. They appear to be of phreatomagmatic origin, or by the interaction between eruption processes and a river.

Petrologically, the El Toro field rocks belong to potassium-rich andesite-basaltic andesite-basalt. Three types of rocks are distinguished by texture and mineral and phenocryst content. Other volcanoes in the area with similar petrologies include Cerros Negros de Jama and Cerro Morado, and similar to other monogenetic volcanoes in the Puna. Differences between the rocks in the various cones indicate origin of the magma at varying depths and temperatures.

The white matrix found between lapilli contains alkalifeldspath, hematite, hisingerite, montmorillonite, saponite and silica. It was probably formed by weathering of mafic minerals.

=== Dating ===
The eruption products of the Toro 1 and Toro 2 cones are partially buried by an ignimbrite named the Cerro Morado Ignimbrite. This ignimbrite is rhyodacitic in composition and contains abundant crystals. Another ignimbrite layer, possibly derived from the Convento/Coyahuaima volcano, overlies the Campo Negro cone rocks. Stratigraphic relations with older ignimbrites and younger lavas indicate an age between 6.45±0.15 mya and 2.03±0.07 mya.

== See also ==
- Altiplano-Puna volcanic complex
- List of volcanic fields

== Sources ==
- Presta, Juan F.; Caffe, Pablo J. (31 January 2014). "Historia eruptiva de los volcanes monogenéticos de El Toro (23º05'S-66º42'W), Puna norte, Argentina" [Eruptive history of monogenetic volcanoes from El Toro (23º05´S-66º42´W), northern Puna, Argentina]. Andean Geology (in Spanish). 41 (1): 142–173. doi:10.5027/andgeoV41n1-a06. hdl:11336/31854.
