= Lucero volcanic field =

Volcanic field in New Mexico

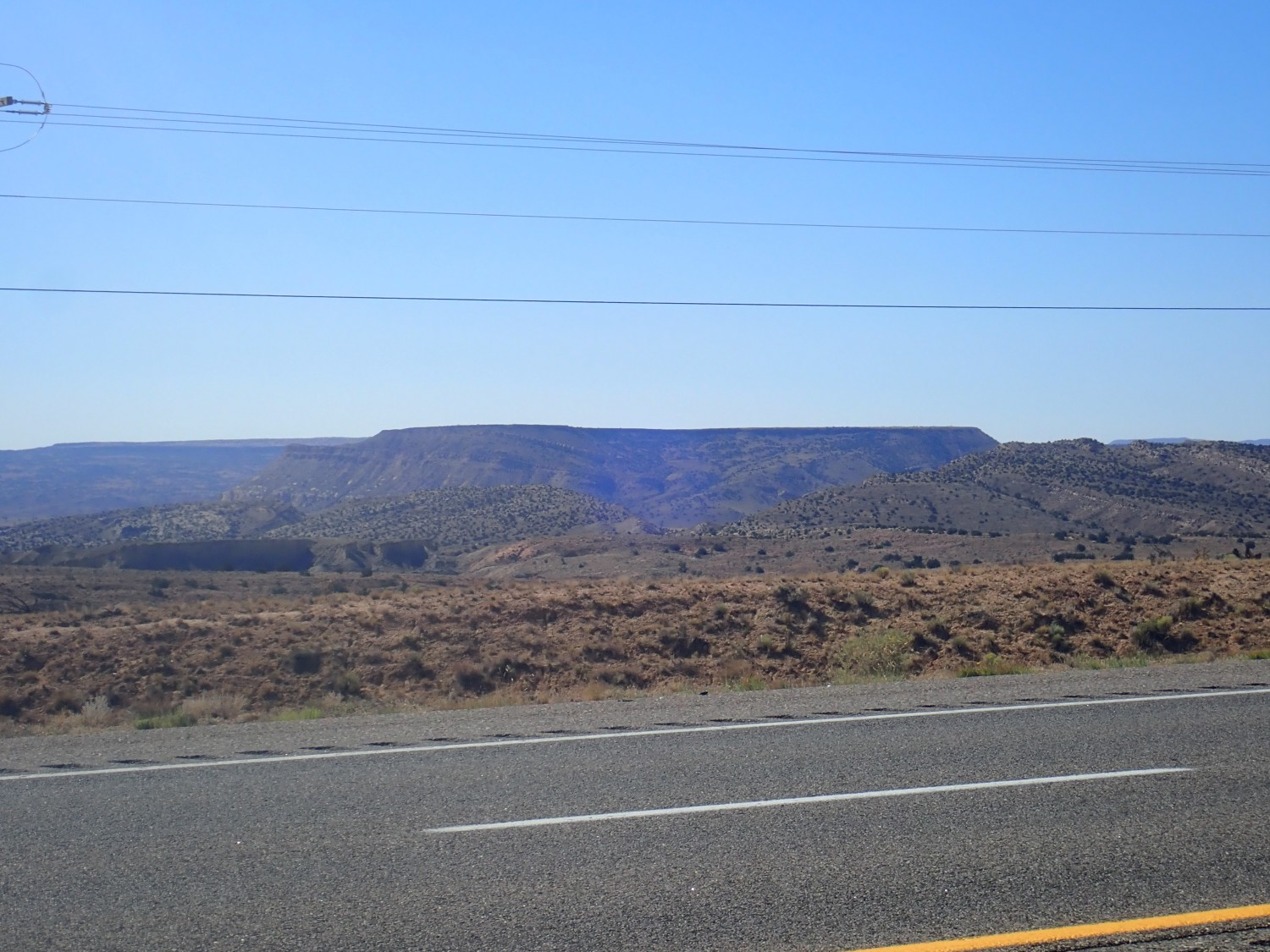
- Mesa Lucero, New Mexico, US

Highest point
- Elevation: 1,573 to 2,395 metres (5,161 to 7,858 ft)
- Coordinates: 34°42′N 107°20′W

Geography
- Location: New Mexico, United States

Geology
- Rock age: 8.3 million years
- Mountain type: Volcanic field
- Volcanic zone: Rio Grande rift
- Last eruption: 0.5 million years ago

The Lucero volcanic field is a monogenetic volcanic field located New Mexico, US. The field is located on the transition between the southeastern Colorado Plateau and the Rio Grande rift and was erupted in three pulses, at 8.3−6.2, 4.3−3.3, and 1.1−0 Mya. The field consists of isolated outcrops scattered over an area of about 2,000 square kilometers (770 sq mi) with a total eruptive volume of about 7.3 cubic kilometers (1.8 cu mi).

The field erupted silica-poor (mafic) lavas ranging from low-alkali tholeiitic basalt to basanites and other alkaline magmas. The more recent eruptions are increasingly dominated by tholeiitic magmas, suggesting that the source region for the magma has become increasingly shallow over time. The pause between the first and second pulse coincides with a general decrease in volcanism on the Colorado Plateau and Rio Grande rift, while the pause between the second and third pulse seems to be local and to correspond to a shift in volcanism to the nearby Mount Taylor volcanic field. Older eruptive centers are located at higher elevations than younger eruptive centers, illustrating development of inverted topography as the landscape has evolved.

Because the field contains individual vents displaying hydromagmatic, Strombolian, and effusive eruption modes, and because the subsurface strata are well characterized, the field has been studied to develop models of entrainment of country rock in eruptive conduits.

== Notable vents ==
Name	Elevation		Location	Last eruption
Name	meters	feet	Coordinates	Last eruption
Badger Butte			34.829°N 107.397°W	0.5 ± 0.1 Mya
Mush Mountain			34.769°N 107.491°W	0.7 ± 0.1 Mya
Volcano Hill			34.818°N 107.194°W	0.8 ± 0.1 Mya
Cerro Verde	2171	7123	34.768°N 107.284°W	-
Mesa del Oro			34.653°N 107.479°W	1.1 ± 0.1 Mya
Tres Hermanos Mesa			34.500°N 107.563°W	3.3 ± 0.1 Mya
Victorino Mesa			34.677°N 107.609°W	3.5 ± 0.1 Mya
Table Mountain			34.429°N 107.626°W	3.7 ± 0.1 Mya
Mesa Lucero			34.858°N 107.194°W	4.1 ± 0.1 Mya
Lava Butte			34.886°N 107.332°W	6.2 ± 0.8 Mya
Chicken Mountain			34.663°N 107.282°W	7.7 ± 0.2 Mya
Dough Mountain			34.918°N 107.310°W	8.2 ± 0.2 Mya
Hidden Mountain			34.782°N 106.998°W	8.3 ± 0.2 Mya

== See also ==
- List of volcanoes in the United States
- List of volcanic fields
