= Licto volcanic field =

Volcanic field in Ecuador

Licto is a volcanic field in Ecuador, close to the town of Licto.

The scoria cones named Licto, Loma Bellavista (3,113 metres (10,213 ft), 01°47′17″S 78°35′46″W) and Tulabug (3,336 metres (10,945 ft), 01°46′49″S 78°36′48″W) form the field.

The cones are constructed by andesite and basaltic andesite and may be of Pleistocene-Holocene age.

== See also ==
- List of volcanic fields
