= Moctezuma volcanic field =

Volcanic field in Sonora, Mexico

Moctezuma volcanic field is a volcanic field in Sonora, Mexico. The towns of Moctezuma, La Junta, Casa Grande, San Clemente de Terapa, Tepache, El Llano and Divisaderos lie in the area.

Volcanic activity in Mexico encompasses both oceanic and continental types of volcanic activity. Geographically, volcanism in Mexico is often subdivided into a Californian, Eastern Alcalic, Sierra Madre Occidental and Trans-Mexican Volcanic Belt, with the addition of a fifth proposed in 2007, which is known as the Northern Mexico Extensional Province.

The field is located in the Moctezuma basin, in central Sonora on the western foot of the Sierra Madre Occidental range. The ranges immediately east and west of the Moctezuma basin are known as Sierra La Madera and Sierra El Coyote, respectively. This is a sedimentary basin delimited by faults; the basin is part of the Basin and Range Province of the state of Sonora. The oldest rocks are of Cretaceous age and a number of fossils have been investigated there. Volcanic activity occurred early in the basin's history, with one old lava flow intercalated between sediments dated at 22.3 million years ago. The lithosphere in the region was thicker back then.

Five pyroclastic cones are found in the field and are named Cerro el Barril (29°40′0″N 109°31′0″W), 90 metres (300 ft) high Cerro Blanco which is covered by lava bombs (29°36′0″N 109°31′0″W), Cerro los Fierros (29°39′0″N 109°31′0″W), Cerro Mogote de Corralles (29°39′0″N 109°28′0″W), Cerro Villalobos (29°41′0″N 109°32′0″W) and Rancho la Poma (29°49′0″N 109°34′0″W). These cones and associated lava flows cover a surface of about 200 square kilometres (77 sq mi). The Rio Moctezuma and its tributary Rio Tepache flow through the area. Lava flows have repeatedly impounded the Moctezuma river and dammed it.

Rocks erupted in the field are basaltic andesite and hawaiite. These rocks are mafic and often hypersthene, nepheline or quartz normative. Olivine forms phenocrysts. The total volume of the latest products is less than 2 cubic kilometres (0.48 cu mi). There was a change in composition from tholeiite to alkali basalt over time, something observed in other volcanic centres of the Basin and Range Province as well. There is evidence that while older volcanism originated from lithospheric magma, more recent activity comes from asthenospheric magma. Moctezuma rocks noticeably lack xenoliths.

In the Terapa area, vegetation is formed by thornscrub and climate data amounting to an average temperature of 22 °C (72 °F) and average precipitation of 350–450 millimetres per year (14–18 in/year) have been computed.

Early volcanism was tholeiitic and formed a mesa with columnar joints exposed in river valleys. These eruptions occurred along the faults which delimit the basin, one date obtained from them is 1.7 ± 0.74 million years ago. Pahoehoe lava and pillow lava has been found on these flows. The pyroclastic cones were formed during later alkali basalt volcanism. The youngest eruption occurred at Cerro Blanco, forming lava flows. Potassium-argon dating has yielded an age of 530,000 ± 200,000 years ago. This cone formed aa lava flows that generated the Mesa Grande malpais.

== See also ==
- List of volcanic fields
