= Tafna Beni Saf =

Volcanic field in Algeria

- Location within Algeria

Highest point
- Elevation: 480 m (1,570 ft)
- Coordinates: 35.28°N 1.45°W

Tafna Beni Saf is a volcanic field in Algeria. It was active during the Pleistocene until 820,000 years ago, and is part of the larger Oranie volcanic field.

== See also ==
- List of volcanic fields
