= Dilo-Dukana volcanic field =

Volcanic field in Ethiopia and Kenya

- Location within Ethiopia Location within Kenya

Highest point
- Elevation: 1,111 m (3,645 ft)
- Coordinates: 4°14′51″N 37°32′13″E

The Dilo-Dukana volcanic field is a Pleistocene volcanic field extending across the Ethiopia–Kenya border of East Africa. It has a northeast trend and contains 52 eruptive centres, 26 of which are still well-preserved. Most of the eruptive centres are in the form of cinder cones, but the well-preserved centres consist mainly of maars. Eruptions in the Dilo-Dukana volcanic field occurred from several fissures as suggested by the orientation of the eruptive centres; they occur in clusters or alignments. Argon–argon dating of four samples obtained from the Dilo-Dukana volcanic field in 2019 yielded ages ranging from 0.3 to 0.13 million years old. The largest lava flows in the volcanic field engulfed areas of nearly 17 km^{2} (6.6 mi^{2}).

== Volcanoes ==
The Dilo-Dukana volcanic field includes the following volcanoes:

Name	Landform	Elevation	Coordinates
Arusi	Cone	695 m (2,280 ft)	3°51′38″N 37°20′28″E
Bate Ye'Isate Gemora Af	Maar	760 m (2,490 ft)	4°14′15″N 37°42′3″E
Dibbandibba	Cone	1,028 m (3,373 ft)	4°6′55″N 37°25′00″E
Dilo Ye'Isate Gemora Af	Maar	778 m (2,552 ft)	4°16′10″N 37°42′21″E
Didimtu	Cone	899 m (2,949 ft)	3°58′57″N 37°20′36″E
Gof Dukana	Maar	666 m (2,185 ft)	3°59′33″N 37°22′40″E
Golan	Cone	633 m (2,077 ft)	3°49′48″N 37°19′38″E
Kasa	Cone	818 m (2,684 ft)	3°55′37″N 37°24′26″E
Kolchaka	Maar	659 m (2,162 ft)	4°4′13″N 37°21′2″E
Mata Lama	Cone	784 m (2,572 ft)	3°51′59″N 37°23′26″E
Soi	Cone	1,111 m (3,645 ft)	4°14′51″N 37°32′13″E
Sore	Cone	772 m (2,533 ft)	3°52′14″N 37°23′46″E

== See also ==
- List of volcanic fields
