= Bruntál volcanic field =

Volcanic field in the Czech Republic

- Location within Czech Republic

Highest point
- Elevation: 780 m (2,560 ft)
- Coordinates: 49.88°N 17.475°E

The Bruntál volcanic field is a volcanic field in the Nízký Jeseník region of the Czech Republic, named after the town of Bruntál. It consists of several lava flows and cinder cones that formed during the Pliocene and Pleistocene epochs. A potassium–argon date of 0.83 ± 0.12 million years was obtained from the hill Venušina sopka in 2012.

== Volcanoes ==
The Bruntál volcanic field includes the following extinct volcanoes (they last erupted 0.5–1 million years ago):

Name	Elevation	Coordinates
Červená hora	749 m (2,457 ft)	49°46′36″N 17°32′28″E
Malý Roudný	772 m (2,533 ft)	49°52′50″N 17°30′26″E
Uhlířský vrch	672 m (2,205 ft)	49°58′22″N 17°26′23″E
Velký Roudný	780 m (2,560 ft)	49°53′29″N 17°31′23″E
Venušina sopka	655 m (2,149 ft)	49°57′3″N 17°28′40″E
nameless hill near Volárna	622 m (2,041 ft)	49°53′37″N 17°29′24″E

== See also ==
- List of volcanic fields
