= Jaraguay volcanic field =

Volcanic field in Baja California, Mexico

Coordinates: 29.33°N 114.5°W

Jaraguay volcanic field is a volcanic field in northern Baja California, Mexico.

Jaraguay volcanic field is part of a chain of volcanic fields that formed on the Baja California peninsula after subduction of the Pacific Plate beneath it ceased. Starting from the north they are San Quintín, Jaraguay, San Borja, Santa Clara, San Ignacio–San José de Gracia, Santa Rosalía and La Purísima (volcano) volcanic fields.

The field consists of cinder cones and lava flows. The lavas cover a surface area of 2,200 square kilometres (850 sq mi) and tend to have thicknesses 5–35 metres (16–115 ft). Many of these were erupted from fissures with no clear vents. Cinder cones have average heights of 720 metres (2,360 ft) above basis. There is some geographical differentiation with the largest cones found on the western side and the cones concentrated on the easternmost edge. A flat lava plateau also makes up the field. Approximately 214 vents were counted in 2013. Many of these vents are elongated in north-south direction, with a slight NNW-SSE slant.

Rocks erupted in the field range from magnesium-rich basalt to basaltic andesite, and define a calc-alkaline suite. These magnesium rich lavas have been named "bajaites". Late Miocene adakites are also found in Jaraguay. These melts probably form from dehydration melting of the mantle modified by the previous subduction of the Farallon plate; another older theory attributed their formation to the attempted subduction of a spreading ridge. The basement of the field is formed by Mesozoic sedimentary sequences with Cretaceous intrusions and Tertiary volcanic rocks.

Activity may be of Holocene age; some flows appear to be more recent than lava flows from San Quintín Volcanic Field which overlie 5,000-6,000-year-old deposits. Other than that, potassium-argon dating indicates effusive activity between 20 and 14 million years ago with a peak between 12.2 and 3.9 million years ago.

== See also ==
- List of volcanic fields
