= Addington volcanic field =

Volcanic field in Alaska, United States

- Location within Alaska

Highest point
- Elevation: −70 m (−230 ft)
- Coordinates: 55.44°N 134.17°W

The Addington volcanic field is a submerged volcanic field in the U.S. state of Alaska, located about 20 km (12 mi) offshore of Cape Addington on Prince of Wales Island in the Alexander Archipelago. It is southwest of Iphigenia Bay and may have been the source of Late Pleistocene pyroclastic fall distributed throughout the Alaskan Panhandle. The Addington volcanic field is not known to have been volcanically active since the Pleistocene.

== See also ==
- List of volcanic fields
