= Las Cumbres (volcano) =

Volcano in Mexico

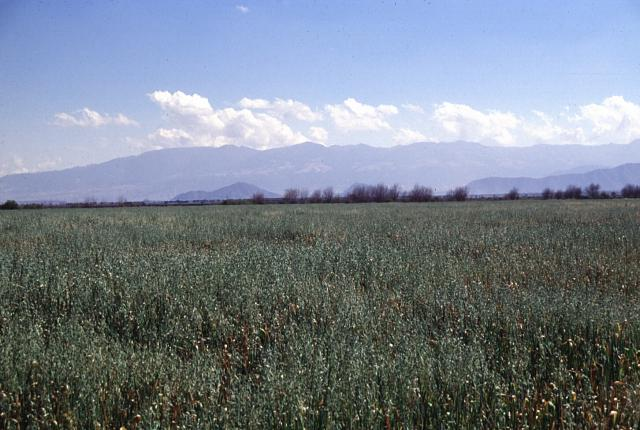

Highest point
- Elevation: 3,940 m (12,927 ft)
- Coordinates: 19.15°N 97.27°W

Geography
- Location: Puebla
- Country: Mexico
- Parent range: Trans-Mexican Volcanic Belt

Geology
- Mountain type: Stratovolcanoes
- Last eruption: 3920 BCE

Las Cumbres is a stratovolcano in Puebla, Mexico. It features an amphitheater-shaped caldera measuring 4 km (2.5 mi) across with its eastern wall breached. Major lava flows around the volcano are andesitic. Inside the crater is a dacitic lava dome. Previously thought to be as tall as Pico de Orizaba, the cone was destroyed in an ancient debris avalanche.

== Volcanism ==
Much of Las Cumbres formed during the early to middle Pleistocene, and volcanism ended by the late Pleistocene. At the time, the volcanic cone was glaciated, similar to all volcanoes taller than 4,000 m (13,000 ft). Prior to a major cone collapse, Las Cumbres may have been approximately the same height as Pico de Orizaba (5,675 m (18,619 ft)). The catastrophic eruption has been dated to approximately 16,980 ± 870 years Before Present, beginning with phreatomagmatic explosions as magma interacted with the glaciers. This also generated significant lahars. The eruption transitioned to a plinian phase when external water could not make contact with magma. The volcano erupting about 4 km^{3} (0.96 cu mi) of magma in this stage which triggered the cone's collapse.

The collapse was directed to the east, depositing an estimated 60–80 km^{3} (14–19 cu mi) of the cone towards the present-day Huitzilapan and Pescados rivers. Field survey indicated the deposit covered 1,500 km^{2} (580 sq mi). Close to the volcano, these deposits were up to 100 m (330 ft) thick and clastic rocks were the size of boulders. Some 20 km (12 mi) away, the collapse avalanche transitioned into a debris flow. Near the Gulf of Mexico, some 120 km (75 mi) away, the flow became hyperconcentrated.

Following the collapse, the eruption entered its vulcanian phase when water was able to interact with magma. This caused phreatomagmatic eruptions to resume, and another plinian eruptive phase occurred when the unobstructed volcanic vent allowed magma to flow. The horseshoe-shaped caldera and collapse deposit was partly buried by a lava flow. The dacitic lava dome marked the end stage of the eruption phase.

== See also ==
- List of volcanoes in Mexico
