= Mrit-Ment volcanic field =

Volcanic field in Morocco

- Location within Morocco

Highest point
- Elevation: 700 m (2,300 ft)
- Coordinates: 33.47°N 2.97°W

The Mrit-Ment volcanic field is a volcanic field in Morocco, last known to have been volcanically active during the Pleistocene.

== See also ==
- List of volcanic fields
