= San Diego volcanic field =

Volcanic field in El Salvador and Guatemala

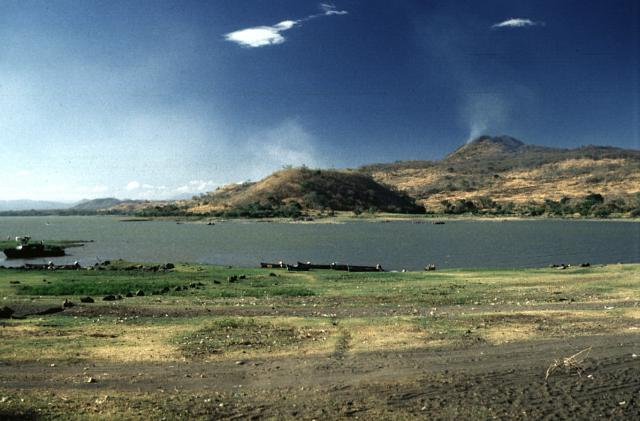
- Lake Güija with Volcán de San Diego in the upper right

Highest point
- Peak: Cerro el Shiste
- Elevation: 781 m (2,562 ft)
- Coordinates: 14°24′N 89°34′W

Geography
- Country: El Salvador/Guatemala
- State: Santa Ana Department/Jutiapa Department

Geology
- Volcanic arc: Central America Volcanic Arc
- Last eruption: Unknown

The San Diego volcanic field is an extensive volcanic field on the El Salvador–Guatemala border of Central America. It consists of a group of basaltic cinder cones and lava flows, with the largest feature being Volcán de San Diego after which the volcanic field is named.

Volcanism in the San Diego volcanic field took place north and east of Lake Güija which is dammed by a large basaltic lava flow from Volcán de San Diego. The volcanic field remains undated but may have been active within the last few thousand years.

== Volcanoes ==
The San Diego volcanic field includes the following volcanoes:

Name	Landform	Elevation	Coordinates
Cerro la Chata	Lava cone	746 m (2,448 ft)	14°24′N 89°34′W
Laguneta Clara	Pyroclastic cone	480 m (1,570 ft)	14°18′N 89°28′W
Loma la Culebra	Pyroclastic cone	572 m (1,877 ft)	14°20′N 89°36′W
Loma Iguana	Pyroclastic cone	521 m (1,709 ft)	14°17′N 89°30′W
Cerro Junquillo	Pyroclastic cone	640 m (2,100 ft)	14°20′N 89°35′W
Cerro Masatepeque	Pyroclastic cone	540 m (1,770 ft)	14°18′N 89°29′W
Cerro de Ostúa	Pyroclastic cone	580 m (1,900 ft)	14°19′N 89°35′W
Loma los Pajalitos	Pyroclastic cone	500 m (1,600 ft)	14°18′N 89°30′W
Cerro Quemado	Pyroclastic cone	460 m (1,510 ft)	14°15′N 89°28′W
Cerro el Shiste	Lava cone	780 m (2,560 ft)	14°24′N 89°34′W
Cerro el Tule	Cone	468 m (1,535 ft)	14°15′N 89°29′W
Cerro la Vega de la Caña	Pyroclastic cone	465 m (1,526 ft)	14°17′N 89°30′W

== See also ==
- List of volcanoes in El Salvador
- List of volcanoes in Guatemala
- List of volcanic fields
