= Khanuy-Gol =

Volcanic field in Mongolia

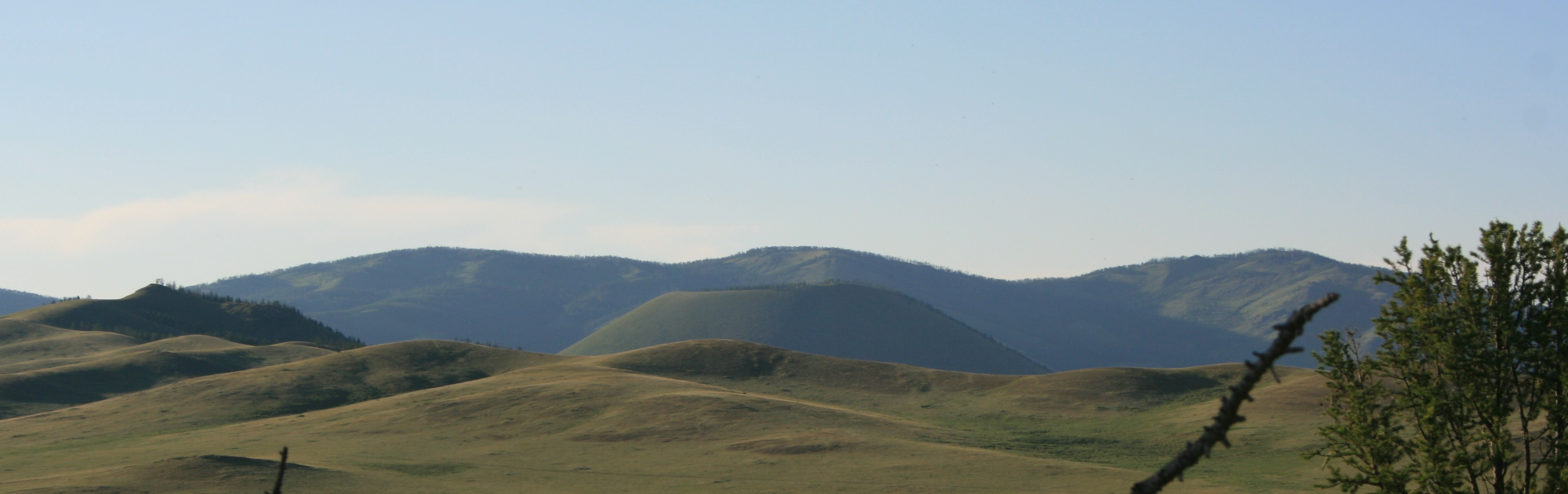
Uran-Togoo

Khanuy-Gol (also known as Bulgan Volcanic Field, Chanuj Gol Hanui Gol or Hanuy Gol) is a volcanic field in Mongolia. Khanuy-Gol is located in the northern Hangai range, north of the settlement of Bulgan.

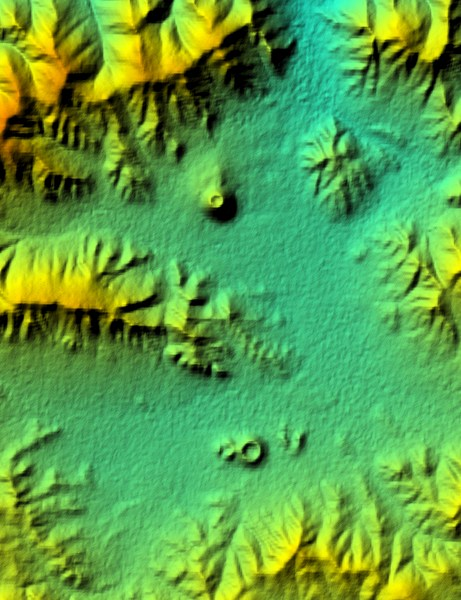
Topographic map

It covers a surface area of 3,500 square kilometres (1,400 sq mi) 150 kilometres (93 mi) southwest of Ulaanbaatar. Among the 10 cones with heights of 30–190 metres (98–623 ft) that make up the field are Baga Togo Uul/Bogo-Togo-Ula (meaning "Little Togo Mountain", 28 metres (92 ft) high, 48°55.79′N 102°46.22′E to 48°55.34′N 102°45.75′E), Ikh Togo Uul/Ikha-Togo-Ula (meaning "Great Togo mountain", 219 metres (719 ft) high, 48°59.53′N 102°44.48′E), Togo, Urun Dush, and Uran Uul. This cone is the highest of the field, with a height of 280 metres (920 ft). Baga Togo Uul has one maar-like vent among its three vents, these vents are named Javalach, Togo and Tulga. Both Togo cones have a vegetation cover.

Volcanic activity began 12.5 ± 1.0 mya, with trachybasalts erupting along the Hanui river. Later two unnamed cones less than 20 kilometres (12 mi) west of the river formed Pleistocene lava flows, one of which is 10–12 metres (33–39 ft) thick. The last eruption is not dated, may be in the Holocene though, judging by Uran Uul's steep sided appearance. The Baga Togo Uul cones are certainly older than 3-4 ka and probably Pleistocene. The field is part of the Hangai volcanic region, which is in turn part of the Baikal rift zone. The Hangai region has been subject to tectonic uplift and high heat flow anomalies and hot springs are found.

The rocks erupted by the cones are olivine basalt with inclusions of ilmenite and xenoliths of peridotite in the case of the Togo cones. Some presumably Pleistocene lava flows are basaltic trachyandesites. The Selenga belt of Permian-Triassic age forms the basement of the field. Seismic tomography has found low-velocity anomalies underground that extend from the volcanic field to the deep upper mantle.

== See also ==
- List of volcanic fields
