= Camargo volcanic field =

Volcanic field in Mexico

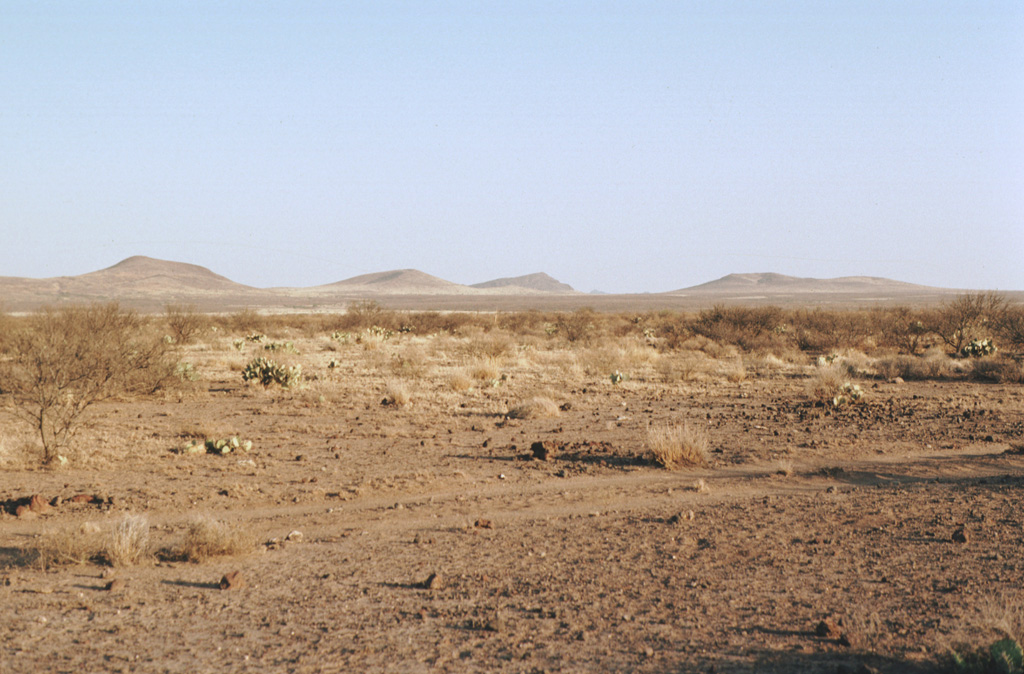
- Volcanic cones of the Camargo volcanic field

Highest point
- Peak: Cerro los Amoles
- Elevation: 1,900 m (6,200 ft)
- Coordinates: 27°52′N 104°15′W

Geography
- Location within Mexico

The Camargo volcanic field is a volcanic field in north-central Mexico. It lies within the northern portion of the Bolsón de Mapimí graben and includes more than 300 eruptive centres, most of which are in the form of cinder cones and lava cones. These cones overlie a 60 km (37 mi) wide and 70 km (43 mi) long lava plateau that covers an area of 2,500 km^{2} (970 mi^{2}).

Volcanism in the Camargo volcanic field took place mainly during the Pliocene, but lesser activity continued into the Pleistocene. An age of 1.43 ± 0.05 million years has been obtained from Cerro el Salto, the best-studied eruptive centre of the Camargo volcanic field. This Pleistocene cinder cone was once mined for its peridot which occurs in spinel-lherzolite xenoliths.

== Volcanoes ==
The Camargo volcanic field includes the following volcanoes:

Name	Elevation	Coordinates
Cerro los Amoles	1,900 m (6,200 ft)	27°52′N 104°15′W
Cerros las Casitas	1,700 m (5,600 ft)	27°46′N 104°12′W
Cerro las Colorados	1,460 m (4,790 ft)	27°51′30″N 104°25′30″W
Cerro el Divisadero	1,320 m (4,330 ft)	27°24′N 104°58′W
Cerro Don Pedro	1,590 m (5,220 ft)	27°20′N 104°26′W
Cerro el Pablo	1,610 m (5,280 ft)	27°43′N 104°14′W
Cerro Quemado	1,880 m (6,170 ft)	27°53′N 104°16′W
Cerro el Salto (La Olivina)	1,780 m (5,840 ft)	27°54′N 104°16′W
Loma la Venada	1,590 m (5,220 ft)	27°19′N 104°32′W
Cerro los Venados	1,700 m (5,600 ft)	27°39′30″N 104°25′00″W

== See also ==
- List of volcanic fields
