= Ventura volcanic field =

Extinct volcanic field in San Luis Potosí, Mexico

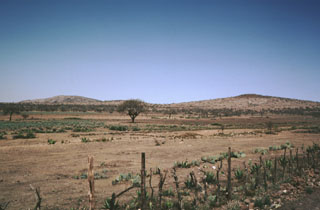

Highest point
- Elevation: 6,677 ft (2,035 m)
- Coordinates: 22°21′52″N 100°45′54″W

Geography
- Location within San Luis Potosí Location within Mexico
- Location: San Luis Potosí
- Parent range: Sierra Madre Oriental

Geology
- Mountain type: Extinct volcanic field
- Last eruption: 1.1 MYA (in Cerro Verde)

Climbing
- Easiest route: Walking

Ventura volcanic field is an extinct volcanic field located in the Mexican state of San Luis Potosí, its name is due to the town and railway crossing of the same name, which had its last activity in the Pleistocene, this volcanic field is known more for the volcanic crater known as La Joya Honda, which is currently a tourist site in San Luis Potosí.

The volcanic field is composed of two cinder cones and three craters, Joyuela (Tuff cone) and Cerro Verde (Pyroplastic cone) and Joya Honda, Laguna de los Paláu and Pozo del Cármen.

== See also ==
- List of volcanic fields
