= Northern Tibet volcanic field =

Volcanic field in the north of Tibet

Northern Tibet volcanic field is a volcanic field (Note: The Global Volcanism Program considers them together.) in China.

== Geography and geomorphology ==
The volcanic field lies in the Quiangtang plateau, in northern Tibet and the Kunlun mountains. The high altitude, bad terrain and weather make geologic investigations in the region difficult. The volcanic field partly covers the Kangtuo formation.

=== Local ===
The Bamaoqiongzong (34°00′N 88°45′E (Note: Individual coordinates are given by Global Volcanism Program in the Synonyms & Subfeatures tab)), Yongbohu and Qiangbaqian (35°30′N 88°15′E) fields featured Hawaiian eruptions that have formed lava flows. Later erosion has reduced these to flat topped conical hills and table mountains. Other volcanic centres are the cones of Heiguotou (34°15′0″N 90°45′0″E), Kushuihuan-Beishan (34°15′0″N 90°0′0″E) and Yuyiehu (33°15′0″N 90°0′0″E). In addition, the Kekexili (35°51′0″N 91°42′0″E) caldera is considered part of the field. This caldera has a diameter of 4 kilometres (2.5 mi). A volcano named "Debussey" is supposedly also located there.

Bamaoqiongzong covers a surface area of 300 square kilometres (120 sq mi). It forms a 5,400-metre-high (17,700 ft) peak with column-jointed rocks at its top. Two craters lie on this peak, one 230 metres (750 ft) wide and 20 metres (66 ft) deep on the northeastern side with a breach southeast and another less well preserved one on the southeastern side. It is surrounded by lava domes and lava sheets. Originally likely over 300 metres (980 ft) thick, now they reach only several 10 metres (33 ft).

Yongbohu features five vents, the principal one has a height of 150 metres (490 ft). One has the shape of a dragon and another one is conical. Quiangbaqian covers a surface of 55 by 70 kilometres (34 mi × 43 mi) and features lava tube and fissure fed lava flows as well as one 200-metre-high (660 ft) volcano. These volcanics are also known as Yulinshan formation. Sometimes, the chronologically, petrologically and geographically distinct Hoh Xil volcanics are grouped with these fields.

=== Composition ===
Bamaoqiongzong, Yongbohu and Qiangbaqian have erupted vitrophyric rocks. Minerals encountered in the vulcanites include andesite, trachyandesite and dacite containing augite, and are subalkaline. (Note: "Lime alkaline" is a different name for "subalkaline".) Bamaoqiongzong is potassic, it also contains phonolite and its minerals include aegyrite, alkali feldspar, analcite, foidite, leucite, noselite and titanaugite. This differences may be caused by the position of the centres with respect to the north Tibet block; the last two centres are located on its margin and the first one inside the block.

== Eruptive history ==
The Bamaoqiongzong, Yongbohu and Qiangbaqian volcanoes appear to be of Quaternary age, seeing as their deposits lie above Pliocene-Pleistocene rocks. Lava flows from Bamaoqiongzong lie on Quaternary lake deposits. Argon-argon dating has yielded ages of 30-26, 18 and 15-14 million years ago for the fields respectively however. Potassium-argon dating of Bamaoqiongzong has yielded ages ranging from 20 to 28.6 million years ago.

There is no evidence for Holocene eruptions. A satellite photo supposedly showing activity from a crater (35°51′N 91°42′E) on a 1.5-kilometre-wide (0.93 mi) cone on the ring fault of the Kekexili caldera in 1973 was later discarded.

== See also ==
- List of volcanic fields
