= Mascota volcanic field =

Volcanic field in Jalisco, Mexico

Coordinates: 20.62°N 104.83°W

The Mascota volcanic field is a volcanic field in Mexico, formed by cinder cones and lava domes located 50 kilometres (31 mi) east of Puerto Vallarta. Several other volcanic fields lie in the vicinity.

Volcanism in the Mascota volcanic field occurs within a complicated tectonic context. The Jalisco Block is bordered by two rift zones and one subduction zone.

The Mascota volcanic field is the youngest occurrence of minettes identified on Earth, with the most recent dates being about 70,000 ± 8,000 years ago. The youngest eruption of the field may have occurred less than 5,600 years ago.

== Geography and geomorphology ==
The Mascota volcanic field lies close to the town of Mascota, 50 kilometres (31 mi) east of Puerto Vallarta. The landscape is dominated by mountains and flat valleys that support agriculture. Dirt roads from Puerto Vallarta and a highway constructed in 1993 from Guadalajara lead into the area.

The Mascota volcanic field is formed by about 87 cinder cones and lava domes. The cones are vegetated, which contrasts with the relatively scarce vegetation of the surrounding Cretaceous terrain. The total surface covered by lavas is about 211 square kilometres (81 sq mi), and the field covers an area of 2,000 square kilometres (770 sq mi).

The Río Mascota and Río Talpa cross the field. Aside from the town of Mascota, Talpa de Allende is another settlement in the southwestern part of the field. The field covers a total area of about 2,000 square kilometres (770 sq mi). East of the Mascota volcanic field lies the wider Atenguillo graben, which has a number of associated volcanic fields. North of Mascota, the San Sebastian volcanic field is older than Mascota and may be associated with the Tepic rift.

== Geology ==
The field lies within the Jalisco tectonic block. Two grabens cut tuffs of Cretaceous age in the area, and the Mascota field has developed in these grabens, with the exception of a group of cones farther north that probably formed on a fault.

This part of Mexico is in a complex tectonic regime. Starting 14 million years ago, extension across the present-day Gulf of California commenced. Extension further occurred during the Pleistocene in the adjacent Mexican mainland in the Tepic-Zacoalco rift, which separates the Jalisco block from the Sierra Madre Occidental, and the Colima rift zone with its probable submarine extension, the Manzanillo canyon. Volcanism and earthquake activity are still ongoing in these rift zones today, forming, for example, Ceboruco and Volcán Colima, which is Mexico's most active volcano. These two rift zones, together with the Middle America Trench, delimit the Jalisco block, which contains four volcanic fields including the Mascota field.

At the same time, the Rivera Plate subducts beneath the Jalisco block, causing earthquakes such as the 1932 Mexico earthquake. Farther south, the Rivera Plate is bordered by the Cocos Plate which is also subducting beneath Mexico. The relatively oblique subduction of the Cocos Plate may be responsible for the Colima graben, while another theory postulates that the Colima graben is an extension of the East Pacific Rise. The Rivera Plate is a remnant of the Farallon Plate.

=== Composition ===
The field is known for having erupted many disparate types of rocks. Observed volcanic rocks include absarokite, andesite, basaltic andesite, hornblende-lamprophyre, minette, and spessartite. Basaltic andesite and minette constitute about 50% of all exposed rocks. Some of this diversity may reflect different classifications of the rocks rather than actual chemical differences, however. A similar variety of volcanic rocks has been found at the adjacent volcanic fields of Ayutla, Los Volcanes, and Tapalpa.

As a plate subducts and sinks into the mantle, it loses water to the overlying mantle wedge. This water also transports material from the subducting slab into the mantle wedge, modifying its chemistry. The melting of this modified mantle wedge appears to be the source of Mascota magmas, albeit with some magmas being modified by interactions with the crust.

The minettes of the Mascota volcanic field are the world's youngest. Potassium-argon dating has yielded ages of 70,000 ± 80,000 years for these rocks.

== Eruptive history ==
Little is known about the eruption ages of the Mascota field. The minettes have been dated using potassium-argon dating, with ages ranging from 1.93 million years ago to 68,000 years ago. A very low magma output of 0.003 ± 0.001 cubic kilometres per millennium (0.00072 ± 0.00024 mi^{3}/ka) has been determined, and volcanism has shifted from the southern to the northern part of the field over its history.

Rocks from the Mascota volcanic field exhibit diverse magnetizations. The youngest eruption occurred at Malpais volcano, which produced a basaltic andesite lava flow with minimal plant cover and no soil cover. This eruption may have happened only a few thousand years ago, and scoria found in neighboring lakes dates from less than 5,600 years ago.

== See also ==
- List of volcanic fields
