= Bijar volcanic field =

Volcanic field in Iran

- Location within Iran

Highest point
- Coordinates: 35.583°N 47.8°E

The Bijar volcanic field is a volcanic field northwest of Hamadan in western Iran. It consists of a group of lava domes and cinder/spatter cones that formed during the Miocene and Pleistocene. The main Miocene volcanic features are dacitic and rhyolitic lava domes whereas the cinder/spatter cones and two rhyolitic lava domes are of Pleistocene age. Potassium–argon dating of the Pleistocene volcanic features has yielded ages ranging from 1.3 to 0.5 million years old. The cinder/spatter cones in this Bijar area volcanic field are alkaline in composition.

== See also ==
- List of volcanic fields
