= Cerros Negros de Jama =

Volcanic field in Argentina

Coordinates: 23°29′S 66°56′W

Cerros Negros de Jama is a monogenetic volcanic group in the Andes, Jujuy Province, Argentina. The group is formed by about four well preserved scoria cones (between 100–150 metres (330–490 ft) high and 450–800 metres (1,480–2,620 ft) wide at the basis, subcircular to elliptic) with lava fields and one isolated lava field, constructed on Ordovician marine sediments and dacitic lavas from the adjacent Cerro Bayo de Archibarca (7.2 million years old) volcano. These cones are aligned submeridionally with a fault system in the ground. The lavas and associated dykes have porphyritic appearance and variable morphology. The lavas show no evidence of ponding in crustal magma chambers, suggesting that the large volatile content of the magma was sufficient to quickly transport it through the crust. Magma temperatures have been estimated at higher than 1,000 °C (1,830 °F).

The cones are constructed by reddish lapilli and lava bombs up to 1 metre (3 ft 3 in) wide with subordinate amounts of ash-like material, concentrated in the talus deposits that have been formed by erosion at the basis of the cones. Arenite of sedimentary origin and dacite are found as xenoliths. The cones were presumably built by Strombolian activity with occasional Hawaiian episodes.

Usually less than 1 metre (3 ft 3 in) thick folded lava flows of gray colour are found in the field, containing xenoliths and scoriaceous material from the cones. In two of the cones were erupted at the base of the cones by dykes. In the northernmost cone, two northeastern lava flows were erupted above each other. The lower flow (900 by 3,000 metres (3,000 ft × 9,800 ft) wide and long) is thinner and contains pyroxene phenocrysts, the upper one has a smaller extent (1,200 metres (3,900 ft) long) and is dominated by olivine. On its western margin, it borders a lineament that cuts through the cones. The eastern cone has no less than four lava flows dominated by olivine, one of which is 2.5 kilometres (1.6 mi) long.

Two other lava fields are also present. Two lava flows at Cerro El Chileno extend 2 kilometres (1.2 mi) southeastward and are associated with pyroclastic mounds (2 by 1 metre (6 ft 7 in × 3 ft 3 in)), suggesting some explosive activity, but no cone. The cone may be buried beneath the lava or might have been eroded away. 3.15 kilometres (1.96 mi) north of Cerro El Chileno lies an isolated lava flow with a circular shape (230 by 220 metres (750 ft × 720 ft)) that may be linked to a cone 2 kilometres (1.2 mi) north.

The volcanic field is located in the Puna-Altiplano highland, a region with strong tectonic and volcanic activity since the Oligocene. Changes in subduction style of the Nazca Plate have produced changes in the nature and amount of volcanic activity, with the latest change being a westward shift of volcanic activity to the main belt of the Central Volcanic Zone. In the region, mafic volcanism has been active since the Oligocene. Most volcanism in the area is of silicic nature however.

== See also ==
- List of volcanic fields
