= Todra volcanic field =

Volcanic field in Niger

Todra Volcanic Field
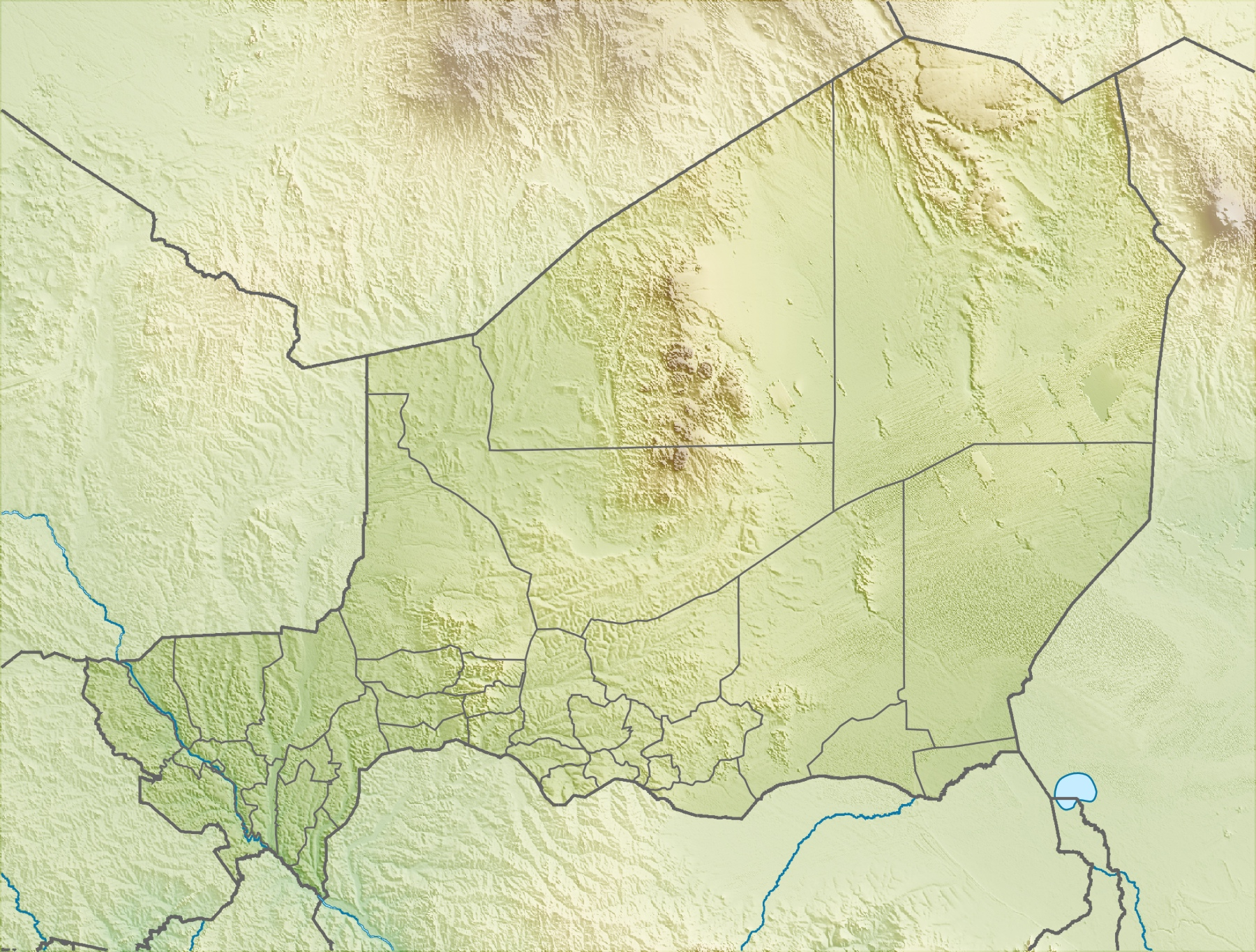
- Location within Niger

Highest point
- Elevation: 1,780 m (5,840 ft)
- Coordinates: 17.68°N 8.5°E

Todra volcanic field is a volcanic field in the Aïr region, Niger.

The field consists of about 150 volcanoes, whose position is fault controlled. Their eruption products (mainly basalt but also phonolite and trachyte) cover a surface of about 1,050 square kilometres (410 sq mi). Geologically, they are located at the northwestern end of the Téfidet graben of the Trans-Saharan orogen.

The field may have had historical eruptions.

== See also ==
- Tin Taralle volcanic field
- List of volcanic fields
