= Berguent volcanic field =

Volcanic field in Morocco

- Location within Morocco

Highest point
- Elevation: 1,200 m (3,900 ft)
- Coordinates: 33.75°N 2.4°W

The Berguent volcanic field is a volcanic field in Morocco. Its last known eruption was in the Pleistocene. It is in the Oriental region of Morocco.

== See also ==
- List of volcanic fields
