= Jordan Craters =

Volcanic field in eastern Oregon, USA

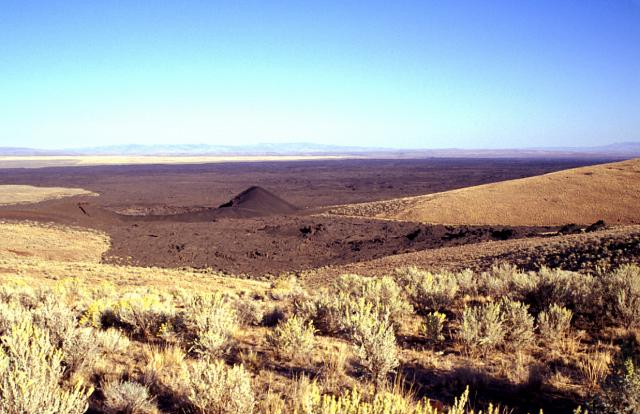
- Coffeepot Crater (left center) was the source of voluminous basaltic lava flows in the Jordan Craters volcanic field of SE Oregon.

Highest point
- Elevation: 4,833 ft (1,473 m)
- Coordinates: 43°06′43″N 117°24′58″W

Geography
- Location: Malheur County, Oregon, United States

Geology
- Rock age: less than 30,000 years
- Mountain type: Volcanic field
- Last eruption: 1250 BCE

== See also ==
- List of volcanoes in the United States of America
- List of volcanic fields
