= Duncan Canal (volcanic field) =

Volcanic field in Alaska, United States

Highest point
- Elevation: 49 ft (15 m)
- Listing: List of volcanoes in the United States of America
- Coordinates: 56.50°N 133.10°W

Geography
- Location: Alaska Panhandle, Alaska, United States

Geology
- Rock age: Holocene
- Mountain type: Volcanic field
- Last eruption: Unknown

Duncan Canal is a volcanic field located in the middle of the Alaska Panhandle, United States. It contains pahoehoe and aa lava flows overlying glacial till at Kupreanof Island. Basaltic lava flows within the Duncan Canal volcanic field are both subaerial and submarine.

== See also ==
- List of volcanic fields
