= Itasy volcanic field =

Volcanic field in Madagascar

- Location within Madagascar

Highest point
- Elevation: 1,800 m (5,900 ft)
- Coordinates: 19.033°S 46.7°E

The Itasy volcanic field is a monogenetic volcanic field west of Lake Itasy in the Itasy Region of central Madagascar. It consists of a north–south trending group of lava domes, scoria cones and maars, as well as lava flows with varying compositions. Volcanism in the Itasy field began during the Pliocene with the eruption of trachytic lava domes and basanitic lava flows. This was followed by Vulcanian eruptions and the effusion of trachytic lava flows. Volcanic activity at the start of the Holocene created a trachytic maar near the village of Saovinandriana. Two Holocene eruptions have been radiocarbon dated: one in 8301 BCE ± 139 years and another in or before 6050 BCE. Geothermal activity and mild seismicity have been recorded in the Itasy volcanic field, the former of which is represented by hot springs.

== Volcanoes ==
The Itasy volcanic field includes the following volcanoes:

| Name | Landform |
|---|---|
| Ambohibe | Dome |
| Ambohimalala | Cone |
| Ambohitritainerina | Cone |
| Ambohitrondry | Cone |
| Ampary | Dome |
| Andranojavatra | Cone |
| Andranoratsy | Crater |
| Andranotoraha | Crater |
| Angavo | Dome |
| Ingilofotsy | Dome |
| Kassijie (Kassigie) | Cone |
| Kitia | Dome |
| Kitombold | Cone |
| Matiankanina | Cone |
| Tsifajavona | Cone |

== See also ==
- List of volcanic fields
