= Aldama volcanic field =

Volcanic field in Mexico

- Location within Mexico

Highest point
- Elevation: 600 m (2,000 ft)
- Coordinates: 23.2°N 98.02°W

The Aldama volcanic field is a volcanic field southeast of the Sierra de Tamaulipas in the Mexican state of Tamaulipas. It occurs along the Gulf of Mexico and consists of lava flows and cinder cones. Eruptions during the Tertiary or Quaternary deposited volcanic rocks of trachytic, phonolitic and basaltic compositions. The Aldama volcanic field is not known to have been volcanically active since the Pleistocene.

== See also ==
- List of volcanic fields
