= Bosque San Diego La Barra =

Coordinates: 14°16′57″N 89°30′0″W

Bosque San Diego La Barra is a forest of the Santa Ana Department, El Salvador. It lies on the eastern side of Lake Güija and south of Laguna de Metapan.
