= Chott Tigri volcanic field =

Volcanic field in Morocco

- Location within Morocco

Highest point
- Elevation: 1,388 m (4,554 ft)
- Coordinates: 32.92°N 1.85°W

The Chott Tigri volcanic field is a volcanic field in Morocco, last known to have been volcanically active during the Pleistocene. It is in the Oriental region of Morocco.

== See also ==
- List of volcanic fields
