= Nemours-Nedroma =

Volcanic field in Algeria

Ghazaouet-Nedroma
- Location within Algeria

Highest point
- Elevation: 444 m (1,457 ft)
- Coordinates: 35.07°N 2.00°W

Nemours-Nedroma is a volcanic field in Algeria. It is in the Tlecmen province. Part of the larger Oranie volcanic field, it has erupted alkali basalts, with one eruption date being 2.1 million years ago.

== See also ==
- List of volcanic fields
