= Oulmés volcanic field =

Volcanic field in Morocco

- Location within Morocco

Highest point
- Coordinates: 33.33°N 6°W

The Oulmés volcanic field is a volcanic field in Morocco. It was active during the Pleistocene until 310,000 years ago, covering a surface of 70 by 20 kilometres (43 mi × 12 mi) in the Middle Atlas.

== See also ==
- List of volcanic fields
