= List of volcanic fields =

A list of volcanic fields follows below.

== Africa ==
=== Algeria ===
- Atakor volcanic field
- In Teria volcanic field
- Manzaz volcanic field
- Nemours-Nedroma
- Tafna Beni Saf
- Tahalra volcanic field

=== Cameroon ===
- Oku Volcanic Field

=== Cape Verde ===
- Charles Darwin volcanic field

=== Chad ===
- Tarso Toh

=== Ethiopia ===
- Dilo-Dukana volcanic field

=== Eritrea ===
- Assab volcanic field

=== Kenya ===
- Dilo-Dukana volcanic field

=== Libya ===
- Gharyan volcanic field
- Haruj

=== Madagascar ===
- Ambre-Bobaomby volcanic field
- Ankaizina volcanic field
- Itasy volcanic field

=== Morocco ===
- Azrou volcanic field
- Berguent volcanic field
- Chott Tigri volcanic field
- Mrit-Ment volcanic field
- Oujda volcanic field
- Oulmés volcanic field
- Rekkame volcanic field

=== Niger ===
- Tin Taralle volcanic field
- Todra volcanic field

=== Sudan ===
- Bayuda volcanic field
- Meidob volcanic field
- Tagabo Hills

== Asia ==
=== China ===
- Hainan Volcanic Field
- Honggeertu volcanic field
- Keluo
- Northern Tibet volcanic field
- Wudalianchi volcanic field

=== Iran ===
- Bijar volcanic field
- Qal'eh Hasan Ali
- Shahsavaran (volcanic field)

=== Mongolia ===
- Khanuy-Gol

=== Saudi Arabia ===
- Harrat Khaybar

=== Syria ===
- Sharat Kovakab

=== Vietnam ===
- Darlac volcanic field
- Pleiku-Bantour volcanic field

== Europe ==
=== Austria ===
- Steirisches Vulkanland

=== Czech Republic ===
- Bruntál volcanic field

=== Spain ===
- Campo de Calatrava Volcanic Field

== North America ==
=== Canada ===
- Atlin Volcanic Field
- Attawapiskat kimberlite field
- Baldface Mountain volcanic field
- Birch Mountains kimberlite field
- Bridge River Cones
- Buffalo Head Hills kimberlite field
- Churchill kimberlite field
- Desolation Lava Field
- Fort à la Corne kimberlite field
- Fort Selkirk volcanic field
- Garibaldi Lake volcanic field
- Iskut volcanic field
- Kirkland Lake kimberlite field
- Lac de Gras kimberlite field
- Lake Timiskaming kimberlite field
- Mount Cayley volcanic field
- Satah Mountain volcanic field
- Snowshoe Lava Field
- Squamish volcanic field
- Tuya volcanic field
- Wells Gray-Clearwater volcanic field
- Wrangell Volcanic Field

=== El Salvador ===
- Apastepeque Volcanic Field
- San Diego volcanic field

=== Guatemala ===
- Chiquimula Volcanic Field
- Cuilapa-Barbarena
- San Diego volcanic field

=== Mexico ===
- Aldama volcanic field
- Boot Heel volcanic field
- Camargo volcanic field
- Durango volcanic field
- Jaraguay volcanic field
- Mascota volcanic field
- Michoacán–Guanajuato volcanic field
- Moctezuma volcanic field
- Naolinco volcanic field
- Potrillo volcanic field
- San Quintín Volcanic Field
- Sierra Chichinautzin
- Trans-Pecos Volcanic Field
- Ventura volcanic field

=== United States ===
- Addington volcanic field
- Adel Mountains Volcanic Field
- Albuquerque volcanic field
- Big Pine volcanic field
- Black Rock Desert volcanic field
- Boot Heel volcanic field
- Boring Lava Field
- Cat Hills volcanic field
- Central Colorado volcanic field
- Cima volcanic field
- Clear Lake Volcanic Field
- Coso Volcanic Field
- Davis Lake volcanic field
- Devils Garden volcanic field
- Diamond Craters
- Duncan Canal (volcanic field)
- East Lava Field
- Espenberg volcanic field
- Four Craters Lava Field
- Hopi Buttes volcanic field
- Imuruk Lake volcanic field
- Indian Heaven
- Jordan Craters
- Lavic Lake volcanic field
- Lucero volcanic field
- Marble Mountain-Trout Creek Hill
- Marysvale volcanic field
- Mogollon-Datil volcanic field
- Mormon volcanic field
- Navajo volcanic field
- Ocate volcanic field
- Potrillo volcanic field
- Red Hill volcanic field
- San Carlos volcanic field
- San Felipe volcanic field
- San Francisco volcanic field
- San Juan volcanic field
- Sand Mountain Volcanic Field
- Sentinel Plain volcanic field
- Springerville volcanic field
- St. Michael volcanic field
- Taos Plateau volcanic field
- Trans-Pecos Volcanic Field
- Uinkaret volcanic field
- Wrangell Volcanic Field
- Yellowstone Plateau Volcanic Field
- Zuni-Bandera volcanic field

== Oceania ==
=== New Zealand ===
- Auckland volcanic field
- Maahunui volcanic field
- Ngatutura volcanic field
- South Auckland volcanic field

== South America ==
=== Argentina ===
- Antofagasta de la Sierra
- Cerro Bitiche
- Cerro Morado
- Cerros Negros de Jama
- Crater Basalt volcanic field
- El Toro volcanic field
- Infiernillo (volcanic field)
- Pali-Aike volcanic field

=== Bolivia ===
- Morococala
- Pampa Luxsar

=== Chile ===
- Caburgua-Huelemolle
- Pali-Aike volcanic field
- Puelche volcanic field

=== Ecuador ===
- Licto volcanic field

=== Peru ===
- Andagua volcanic field
- Huambo volcanic field
