= Rekkame volcanic field =

Volcanic field in Morocco

- Location within Morocco

Highest point
- Elevation: 1,500 m (4,900 ft)
- Coordinates: 33.17°N 3.33°W

The Rekkame volcanic field is a volcanic field in Morocco. It was active during the Pleistocene until 1.4 million years ago.

== See also ==
- List of volcanic fields
