= Tin Taralle volcanic field =

Volcanic field in Niger

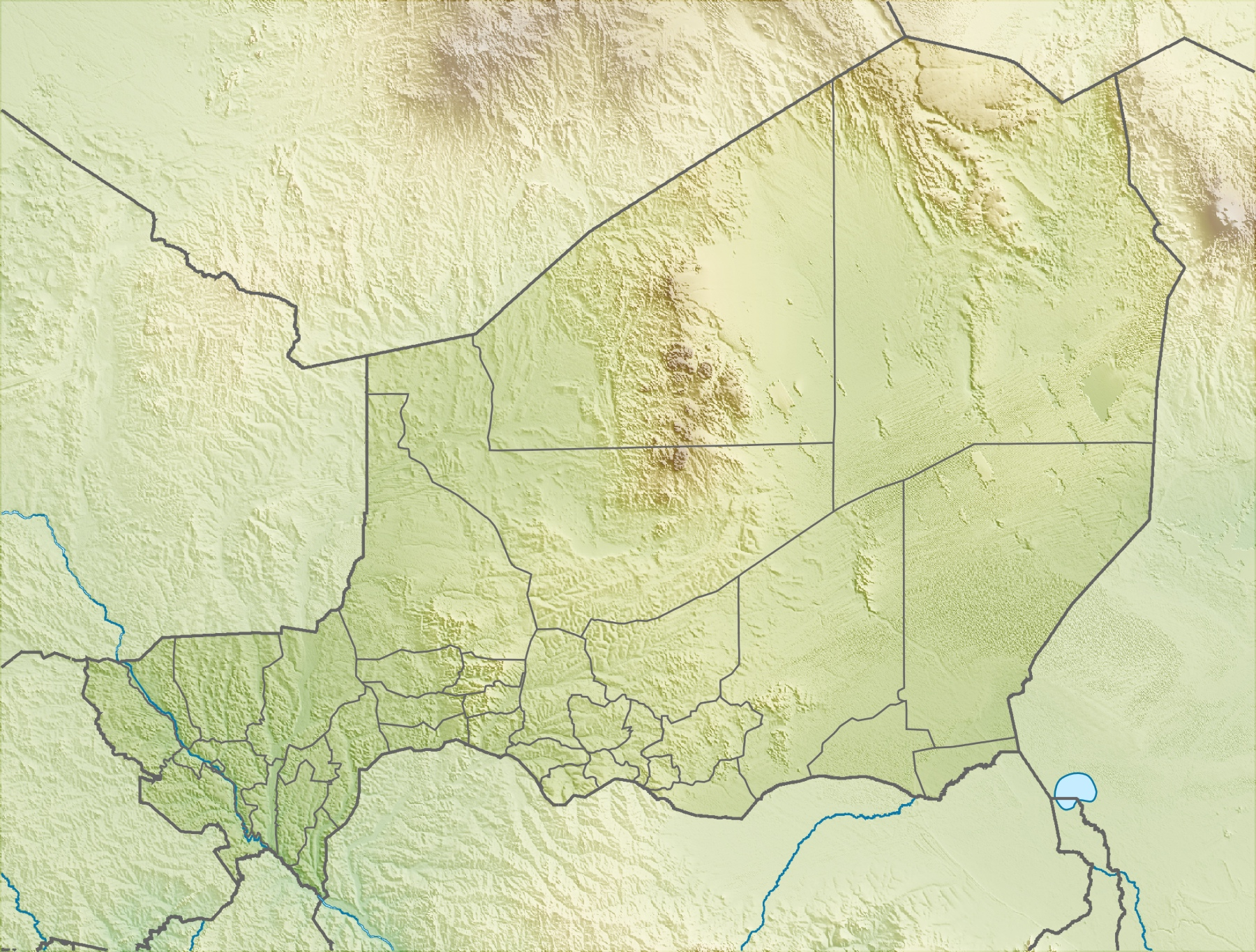
- Location within Niger

Highest point
- Coordinates: 18.27°N 9.33°E

Tin Taralle volcanic field is a volcanic field in the Aïr region of Niger, which covers a surface area of 50 square kilometres (19 sq mi). It was active during the Pleistocene, with eruptive episodes between 28-20, 15-8 and 4 to 0.7 million years ago. The field consists of cinder cones which have mostly erupted basalt but also phonolite and trachyte.

== See also ==
- List of volcanic fields
