= Darlac volcanic field =

Volcanic field in Vietnam

- Location within Vietnam

Highest point
- Coordinates: 12.88°N 108.2°E

The Darlac volcanic field is a volcanic field in southern Vietnam. It is the southern extension of the Pleiku-Bantour volcanic field and consists of a cluster of volcanic cones. The Darlac volcanic field is not known to have been volcanically active since the Pleistocene.

== See also ==
- List of volcanic fields
