= Maahunui volcanic field =

Submarine volcanic field off New Zealand

- Volcanic field
- Approximate extent of Maahunui volcanic field
- Interactive map of Maahunui volcanic field
- Coordinates: 44°00′32″S 172°33′54″E
- Offshore water bodies: Pacific Ocean
- Age: Middle Miocene (15.9–11 Ma)

Area
  - Total: 1,520 km^{2} (590 sq mi)
- Last eruption: 11.5 Ma

The Maahunui volcanic field is an extinct basaltic submarine Miocene monogenetic volcanic field off the east coast of the South Island of New Zealand to the south of the more recent Banks Peninsula Volcano.

== Geology ==
Over 30 volcanic features including craters and cones have been described in the Maahunui Volcanic Field, even although most are buried in up to 1 km (0.62 mi) thickness of ocean sediment. These are intraplate small-volume single event volcanoes. A feature of the field is that it was always underwater, but some of the cones formed islands in the historic sea and then have been eroded with characteristic flattened tops. It has been thought that explosive eruptions are rare in volcanoes whose vents are more than 100 m (330 ft) deep under water, but such must have occurred for some of the located craters that must have been formed at about 1 km (0.62 mi) deep. The eruptions occurred between 15.9 and 11 million years ago, mostly in the last 2 million years of this period. The resulting seamounts were finally all buried about the time that Banks Peninsula was formed in the late Miocene. The area of the field is about 1,520 km^{2} (590 sq mi) and the presence of the volcanoes is relevant to mineral and other potential exploitation of the Canterbury submarine basin. The detailed understanding of the field results from bore hole and seismic data accumulated over many years of geological mapping.

== Name ==
The name Maahunui relates to the canoe of Maui which (according to Māori legend) became the South Island of New Zealand. It is the term Māori use for the coast south of Banks Peninsula. It was so named after appropriate consultation in 2019.

== See also ==
- List of volcanic fields
