= Ankaizina volcanic field =

Volcanic field in Madagascar

- Ankaizina volcanic field in 2001

Highest point
- Elevation: 2,878 m (9,442 ft)
- Coordinates: 14.3°S 48.67°E

Geography
- Location within Madagascar

The Ankaizina volcanic field is a volcanic field of Cenozoic age in northern Madagascar. Volcanism was at first mainly silicic, producing pyroclastic flows which was followed by the eruption of minor basaltic lava flows. The most recent volcanism in the Ankaizina field probably took place during the Holocene with the eruption of well-presevered cinder cones and lava flows near Bealanana.

== See also ==
- List of volcanic fields
