= In Teria volcanic field =

Volcanic field in Algeria

- Location within Algeria

Highest point
- Coordinates: 26.814°N 9.638°E

In Teria volcanic field is a volcanic field in Algeria. It consists of about 20 craters.

== Geography and geomorphology ==
In Teria is located close to Illizi. The field consists of about twenty volcanic craters and tuff rings in a terrain of 100 square kilometres (39 sq mi), which were possibly formed by phreatomagmatic eruptions. None of the craters exceeds 2 kilometres (1.2 mi) in width.

== Geology ==
This volcanic field lies northeast of Hoggar. Volcanism in northern Africa, such as in Darfur, Hoggar and Tibesti, has variously been proposed to be due to mantle plumes, reactivated tectonic lineaments in the crust and several more geologic mechanisms. In Hoggar, after Cenozoic uplift, volcanism peaked in the Miocene after an Eocene start and continued to this day.

The field has also produced lapilli, lava bombs and melilitic rocks which contain xenoliths. Minerals found at In Teria include granite, granulite, garnet and spinel peridotite, phlogopite, phlogopitite and pyroxenite. These xenoliths have interacted with melts and testify to the presence of old, thick lithosphere.

== Eruption history ==
The field was emplaced during the Quaternary, with possible Holocene activity.

== See also ==
- List of volcanic fields
