= Charles Darwin volcanic field =

Submarine volcanic field in the Cape Verde islands

Coordinates: 16°42′18″N 25°34′54″W

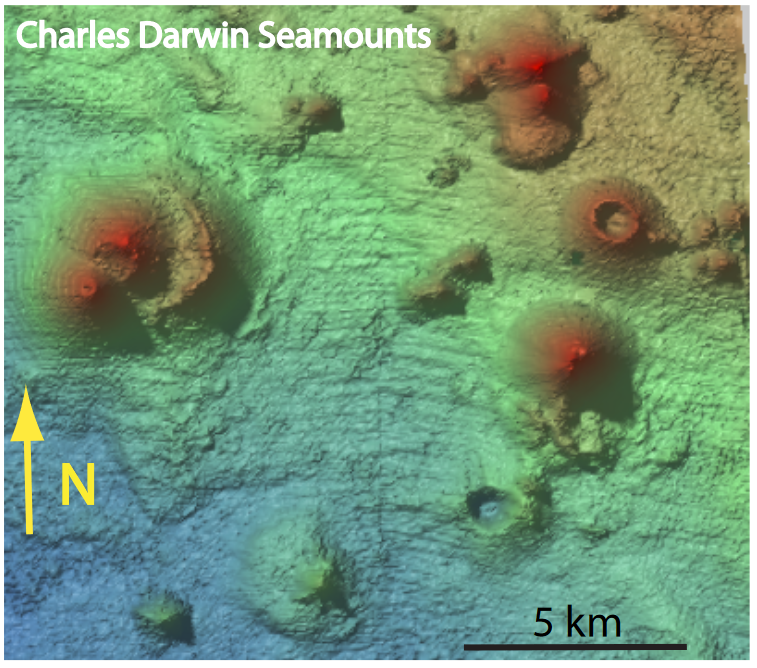
Bathymetric map of the Charles Darwin volcanic field

Charles Darwin volcanic field is a submarine volcanic field in the Cape Verde islands.

It was discovered by the RRS Charles Darwin.

It lies southwest of Santo Antao island at 3,600 metres (11,800 ft) depth. Two vents are named Tambor and Kolá; the first is 2,500 metres (8,200 ft) wide and 250 metres (820 ft) high while the second is 1,000 metres (3,300 ft) wide and 260 metres (850 ft) deep. Both feature 1 kilometre (0.62 mi) wide pit craters. Other vents are known as Tabanka, Batuku, Mandora, De Saude and Koladera. Vents in the Charles Darwin volcanic field include cones with pahoehoe, pillow lavas, scoria and have erupted basalts with xenoliths. Unusually for volcanoes at such depths, they show evidence of explosive eruptions. Volcanic rocks appear to be 1,000s or 10,000s of years old and there is no evidence of Holocene activity but the volcanic field was active in recent times and seismic swarms have been recorded.

Corals and sponges grow on the volcanoes. Bioluminescent gorgonians have been sampled at the Charles Darwin volcanic field.

== See also ==
- List of volcanic fields
