= Churchill kimberlite field =

Kimberlite field in Nunavut, Canada

Coordinates: 63°05′32″N 091°10′07″W

The Churchill kimberlite field is a kimberlite field near Hudson Bay in Nunavut, Canada. It was formed during three magmatic events between 225 and 170 million years ago. The proposed source of volcanism has been the New England and Cape Verde hotspots.

== See also ==
- List of volcanoes in Canada
- List of volcanic fields
- Volcanism of Northern Canada
