= Fort à la Corne kimberlite field =

Kimberlite field in Saskatchewan, Canada

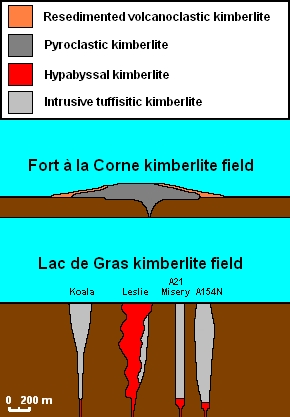
Fort à la Corne-Lac de Gras kimberlites

The Fort à la Corne kimberlite field is a 104- to 95-million-year-old diamond-bearing kimberlite field in east-central Saskatchewan, Canada. Its kimberlite pipes are among the most complete examples in the world, preserving maar-shaped craters.

== See also ==
- List of volcanoes in Canada
- List of volcanic fields
- Volcanism of Canada
- Volcanism of Western Canada
