= Vulcanian eruption =

Volcanic eruption with dense ash clouds

Vulcanian eruption: 1 ash plume, 2 lapilli, 3 lava fountain, 4 volcanic ash fall, 5 volcanic bomb, 6 lava flow, 7 layers of lava and ash, 8 stratum, 9 sill, 10 magma conduit, 11 magma chamber, 12 dike

A Vulcanian eruption is a type of volcanic eruption characterized by a dense cloud of ash-laden gas exploding from the crater and rising high above the peak. They usually commence with phreatomagmatic eruptions which can be extremely noisy due to the rising magma heating water in the ground. This is usually followed by the explosive clearing of the vent and the eruption column is dirty grey to black as old weathered rocks are blasted out of the vent. As the vent clears, further ash clouds become grey-white and creamy in colour, with convolutions of the ash similar to those of Plinian eruptions.

The term Vulcanian was first used by Giuseppe Mercalli, witnessing the 1888–1890 eruptions on the island of Vulcano. His description of the eruption style is now used all over the world. Mercalli described Vulcanian eruptions as "...Explosions like cannon fire at irregular intervals..." Their explosive nature is due to increased silica content of the magma. Almost all types of magma can be involved, but magma with about 55% or more silica (e.g. basaltic andesite) is most common. Increasing silica levels increase the viscosity of the magma which means increased explosiveness.

== Characteristics ==
Vulcanian eruptions display several common characteristics. The mass of rock ejected during the eruption is usually between 10^{2} and 10^{6} tonnes and contains a high proportion of non-juvenile material (> 50%). During active periods of volcanic activity, intervals between explosions vary from less than 1 minute (e.g. Anak Krakatoa) to about a day. Pyroclastic flows are also common features of this type of eruption. The gas streaming phase of Vulcanian eruptions are characterised by discrete cannon-like explosions. These expulsions of gas can reach supersonic velocities resulting in shock waves.

The tephra is dispersed over a wider area than that from Strombolian eruptions. The pyroclastic rock and the base surge deposits form an ash volcanic cone, while the ash covers a large surrounding area. The eruption ends with a flow of viscous lava. Vulcanian eruptions may throw large metre-size blocks several hundred metres, occasionally up to several kilometres.

Vulcanian eruptions are dangerous to persons within several hundred metres of the vent. Volcanic bombs are common products of this type of eruption. These are initially molten blobs of lava, which rapidly cool into blocks often 2 to 3 m across. At Galeras, a Vulcanian eruption ejected bombs which struck several volcanologists who were in the crater, some of whom died or suffered severe injuries.

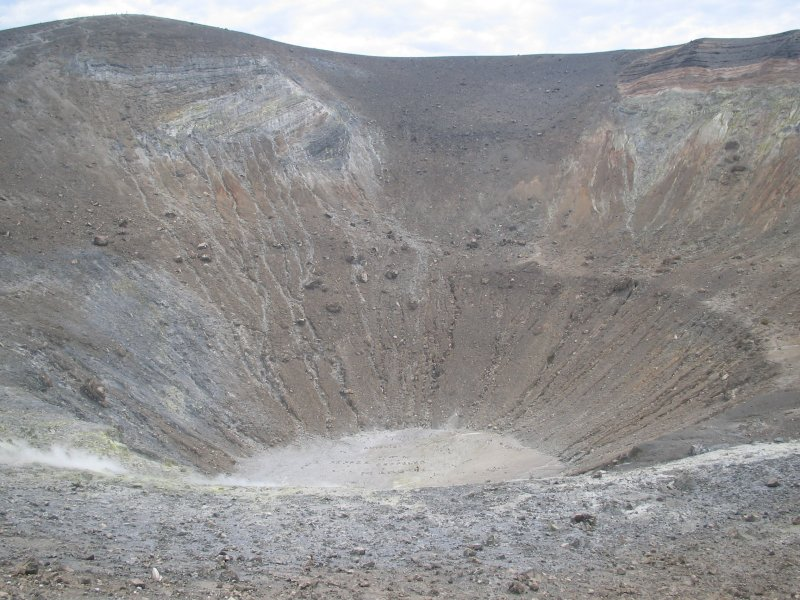
The Gran Cratere, Vulcano. A sense of scale is provided by the tourist visible near the centre of the crater.

== 1930 eruption of Stromboli ==
The 11 September 1930 eruption of Stromboli was a Vulcanian eruption. It started at 08:10 hours (local), when ash was vented for about 10 minutes. Then at 09:52 two incredibly powerful explosions occurred which shook the whole island. Blocks were hurled about 2 km. These fell out of the sky smashing through buildings etc. A tsunami 2 to 2.5 m high was generated. By 10:40 the explosive phase of the eruption was over. Expulsion of lava followed, this flowed down the Sciara del Fuoco, lasting into the night. At the same time incandescent scoria flowed down the Vallonazzo Valley and entered the sea near Piscità.

It is believed that water entered due to a partial collapse of the conduit. The water flashed into steam and took the easiest "escape route" via the open conduit. Expansion by contact with the molten magma generated the two very large explosions.

There were six deaths. Four fishermen died at sea when the avalanches of hot scoria caused the sea to become very disturbed. One person was killed in Stromboli village by falling blocks, and the sixth was killed by the tsunami.

== See also ==
- Volcanic eruption
