= Lake Güija =

Lake in Santa Ana Department, Guatemala

- Lago de Güija (Spanish)
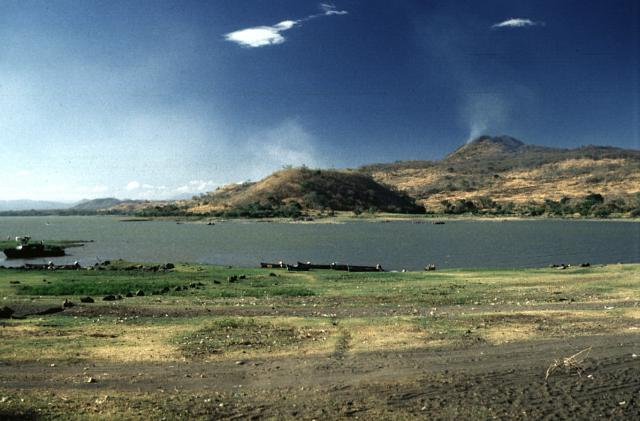
- Lake Güija with Volcán de San Diego in the upper right

- Location within El Salvador
- Location: Jutiapa, Metapan, Santa Ana
- Coordinates: 14°16′N 89°31′W
- Type: Volcanogenic lake
- Primary inflows: Ostúa River
- Basin countries: Guatemala, El Salvador
- Surface area: 45 km^{2} (17 sq mi)
- Surface elevation: 430 m (1,410 ft)

Ramsar Wetland
- Official name: Complejo Güija
- Designated: 16 December 2010
- Reference no.: 1924

Lake Güija is a lake in Central America. The lake is situated on the border between Guatemala and El Salvador and has an area of 45 km^{2} (17 sq mi), of which approximately 32 km^{2} (12 sq mi) lies in El Salvador.

== History ==
The Lenca, Xinca, Chʼortiʼ, and Pipil inhabited the region around the lake. Diego García de Palacio wrote in the 16th century that two rocks near the lake were used by the indigenous population for sacrifice and religious worship. Twenty archaeological sites dating to the Late Preclassic (400 BC–200 AD) and Postclassic (900–1550 AD) have been recorded in the area.

Guatemala and El Salvador placed their border across Lake Güija in 1938, with 7/10ths of the lake inside El Salvador and the remainder in Guatemala. Of the lake's drainage basin, 2,050 square kilometers (790 sq mi) is inside Guatemala. The two countries signed an agreement on sharing the water resources of the lake in 1957.

This site was added to the UNESCO World Heritage Tentative List on September 21, 1992, in the Mixed (Cultural + Natural) category.

== Geography ==
As of 1959, the area of the lake was 42 square kilometers (16 sq mi) and the drainage basin was 2,560 square kilometers (990 sq mi). The Ostúa and Cusmapa rivers are the principal tributaries to the lake.

The lake is of volcanic origin and was formed by a large basaltic lava flow from Volcán de San Diego in the San Diego volcanic field which blocked the Güija depression's original drainage.

=== Important Bird Area ===
The lake and its surrounds has been designated an Important Bird Area (IBA) by BirdLife International because it supports significant populations of range-restricted birds, including white-bellied chachalacas, orange-fronted parakeets, Nutting's flycatchers and white-throated magpie-jays.

== Works cited ==
- Hirsch, Abraham (1959). "A Proposed International Hydroelectric Development Project in Central America: Lake Guija". Land Economics. 35 (2). University of Wisconsin Press: 172–176. doi:10.2307/3144785. JSTOR 3144785.
- Lee, Terence (1995). "The Management of Shared Water Resources in Latin America". Natural Resources Journal. 35 (3). University of New Mexico: 541–553. doi:10.2307/24885658. JSTOR 24885658.
- Stone, Andrea (2014). "Spiritual Journeys, Secular Guises: Rock Art and Elite Pilgrimage at Naj Tunich Cave". Mexicon. 36 (2). Mexicon: 49–64. doi:10.2307/43857664. JSTOR 43857664.
