= Durango volcanic field =

Volcanic field in Durango State, Mexico

Coordinates: 24.15°N 104.45°W

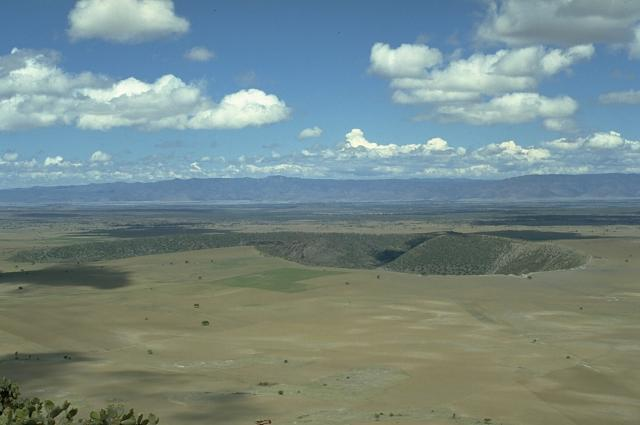
La Breña-El Jagüey maar complex

Durango volcanic field is a volcanic field in north-central Mexico (Durango), east of the Sierra Madre Occidental. The field covers a surface area of 2,100 square kilometres (810 sq mi).

The volcanic field is located in the Tepehuano terrane. Volcanism in the area was accompanied by tectonic extension. There are around hundred cones in the field. Some volcanic rocks have been affected by faulting; buried faults are also found. The San Luis-Tepehuanes fault system is associated with the field. The whole field is covered by lavas, which are about 10 metres (33 ft) thick and reach a total volume of 20 cubic kilometres (4.8 cu mi). Magma ascent has been controlled by northwest-trending faults. Volcanism in the wider territory was related to the subduction of the Farallon plate until 29 mya. Later tectonic changes caused a start of more alkaline volcanism.

The volcanoes have erupted basanite. The main components of the rocks at La Breña-El Jagüey are clinopyroxene, ilmenite, olivine, plagioclase and titanomagnetite, with rocks sporting variable textures. The participation of water in the formation process of these magmas is debatable; the rocks may have been influenced by sediments from the uppermost part of the subducting Farallon slab. These rocks are of mafic intraplate geochemistry. The rocks contain mantle xenoliths.

The most prominent volcanic centres of the field are the La Breña-El Jagüey maars. They form intersected craters and the larger Brena crater has cinder cones within. The diameter of the Brena maar is 1,400 metres (4,600 ft) and Jagüey 700 metres (2,300 ft), rising above a 2,000 metres (6,600 ft) high lava plain. Each maar is surrounded by a tuff ring 30–70 metres (98–230 ft) high. Jaguey presently holds a permanent lake and the formation of both maars was probably influenced by groundwater. Jaguey maar likely formed first, with the Brena maar forming eruption generating surge fields. The formation of the maars has partly buried some neighbouring cinder cones. Other cones in the field may date back to Pliocene-Pleistocene times given their state of degradation; one K-Ar date is 0.8 mya.

These two maars may be the most recent eruption products of the field, likely of Holocene age given the unvegetated appearance of the lava flows. The field is an inhospitable terrain.

== See also ==
- List of volcanic fields
