= Ambre-Bobaomby volcanic field =

Volcanic field in Madagascar

- Location within Madagascar

Highest point
- Elevation: 1,475 m (4,839 ft)
- Coordinates: 12.6°S 49.15°E

The Ambre-Bobaomby volcanic field is a group of volcanic rocks at the northern tip of Madagascar in the Indian Ocean. Volcanism began during the Miocene with the eruption of small pyroclastic flows and the construction of a large volcanic massif. This was followed by the eruption of well-preserved volcanoes during the Quaternary; the latest eruption may be of Holocene age. A wide variety of volcanic rocks comprise the Ambre-Bobaomby volcanic field, including basalt, rhyolite, trachyte, phonolite and foidite. Volcanism in the Ambre-Bobaomby volcanic field is an example of intraplate volcanism.

== See also ==
- List of volcanic fields
