= Monogenetic volcanic field =

Group of volcanoes, each of which erupts once

A monogenetic volcanic field is a type of volcanic field consisting of a group of small monogenetic volcanoes, each of which erupts only once, as opposed to polygenetic volcanoes, which erupt repeatedly over a period of time. The small monogenetic volcanoes of these fields are the most common subaerial volcanic landform.

Many monogenetic volcanoes are cinder cones, often with lava flows, such as Parícutin in the Michoacán-Guanajuato volcanic field, which erupted from 1943 to 1952. Some monogenetic volcanoes are small lava shields, such as Rangitoto Island in the Auckland volcanic field. Other monogenetic volcanoes are tuff rings or maars. A monogenetic field typically contains between ten and a hundred volcanoes. The Michoacán-Guanajuato field in Mexico contains more than a thousand volcanoes and is exceptionally large.

Monogenetic fields occur only where the magma supply to the volcano is low or where vents are not close enough or large enough to develop plumbing systems for continuous feeding of magma. Monogenetic volcanic fields can provide snapshots of the underlying region beneath the surface, and may be useful in studying the generation of magma and the composition of the mantle since the single eruption produced would match that of the chamber from which it erupted. The magma supplying such fields is thought to have rapidly ascended from its source region, with only short resident times (decades or less) in shallow magma chambers.

== Examples ==
- Auckland volcanic field, underlying much of the city of Auckland, New Zealand
- Wells Gray-Clearwater volcanic field, east-central British Columbia, Canada
- Honolulu Volcanic Series, Hawaii, United States
- Boring Lava Field, in and near Portland, Oregon, United States
- Michoacán-Guanajuato volcanic field (includes El Jorullo and Parícutin), Michoacán, Mexico
- Vulkan Eifel, Germany
- Chaîne des Puys, France
- La Garrotxa Volcanic Field (also known as the Olot Volcanic Field), Spain
- Carrán-Los Venados, Chile
- North and north-eastern area of Gran Canaria, Canary Islands, Spain
- Southern Volcanic Zone of Tenerife, Canary Islands, Spain
- Newer Volcanics Province, southeastern Australia
- Kachchh volcanic plugs, Gujarat, India
- Maahunui Volcanic System, Canterbury Basin, New Zealand
- Cat Hills volcanic field in New Mexico, United States
- Cumbre Vieja ridge, La Palma, Canary Islands, Spain

== See also ==
- Polygenetic volcanic field – Group of volcanoes, each of which erupts repeatedly
