= Basaltic andesite =

Volcanic rock that is intermediate in composition between basalt and andesite

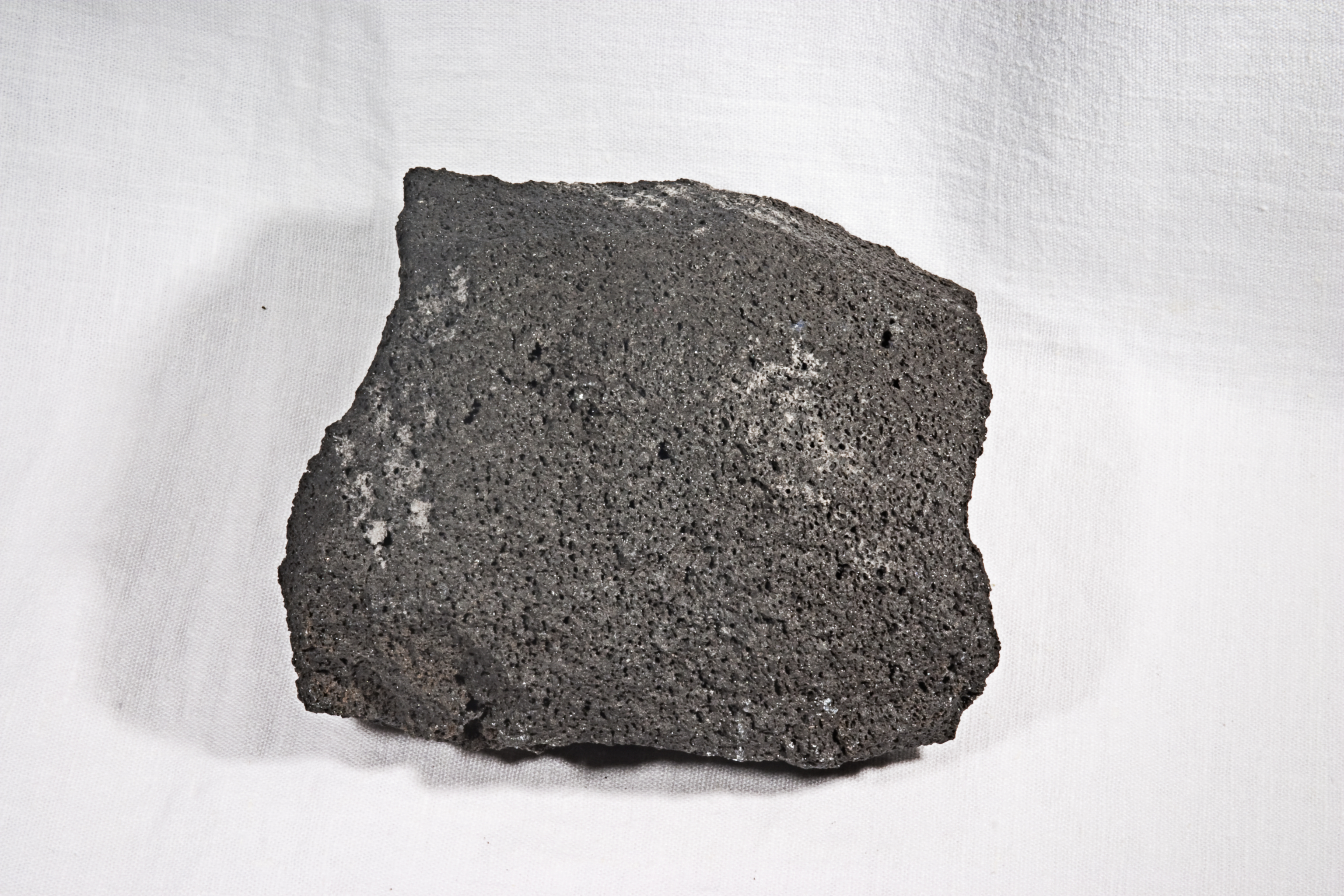
Basaltic andesite from Parícutin volcano in Mexico

Basaltic andesite or andesibasalt is a volcanic rock that is intermediate in composition between basalt and andesite. It is a type of low silica andesite that is composed predominantly of augite and plagioclase. Basaltic andesite can be found in volcanoes around the world, including in Central America and the Andes of South America.

== Description ==
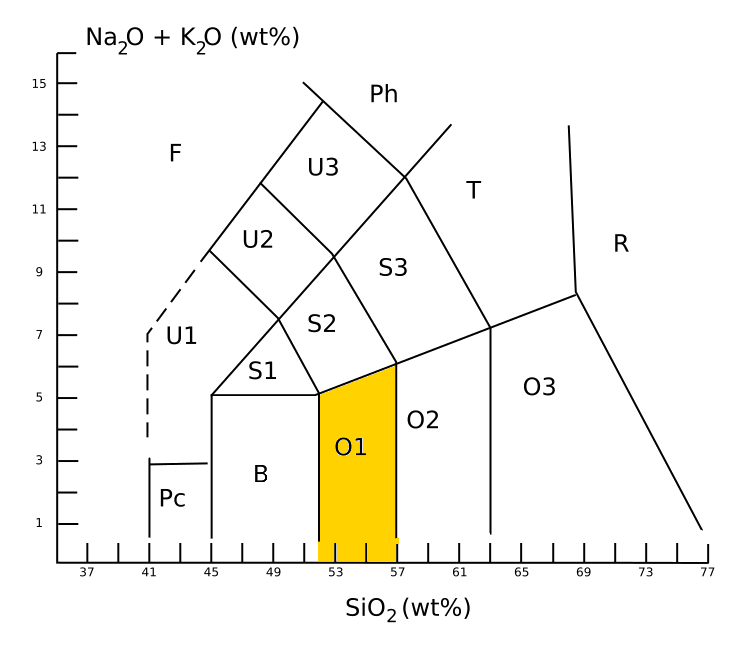
TAS diagram for classifying volcanic rock, with the basaltic andesite field (O1) highlighted

Basaltic andesite is a fine-grained (aphanitic) igneous rock that is moderately low in silica and low in alkali metal oxides. It is not separately defined in the QAPF classification, which is based on the relative percentages of quartz, alkali feldspar, plagioclase feldspar, and feldspathoids, but would fall in the basalt-andesite field. This corresponds to rock in which feldspathoid makes up less than 10% and quartz less than 20% of the total QAPF fraction, and in which at least 65% of the feldspar is plagioclase. Basaltic andesite would be further distinguished from basalt and andesite by a silica content of 52–57%.

Although classification by mineral content is preferred by the IUGS, this is impractical for glassy or very fine-grained volcanic rock, and then the chemical TAS classification is used. Basaltic andesite is then defined as volcanic rock with a silica content of 52–57% and a total alkali content (K_{2}O plus Na_{2}O) of less than about 6%, corresponding to the O1 field in the TAS diagram.

A basaltic andesite (or andesite) enriched in magnesium and depleted in titanium, with more than 8% MgO and less than 0.5% TiO_{2}, is termed a boninite.

== Occurrence ==
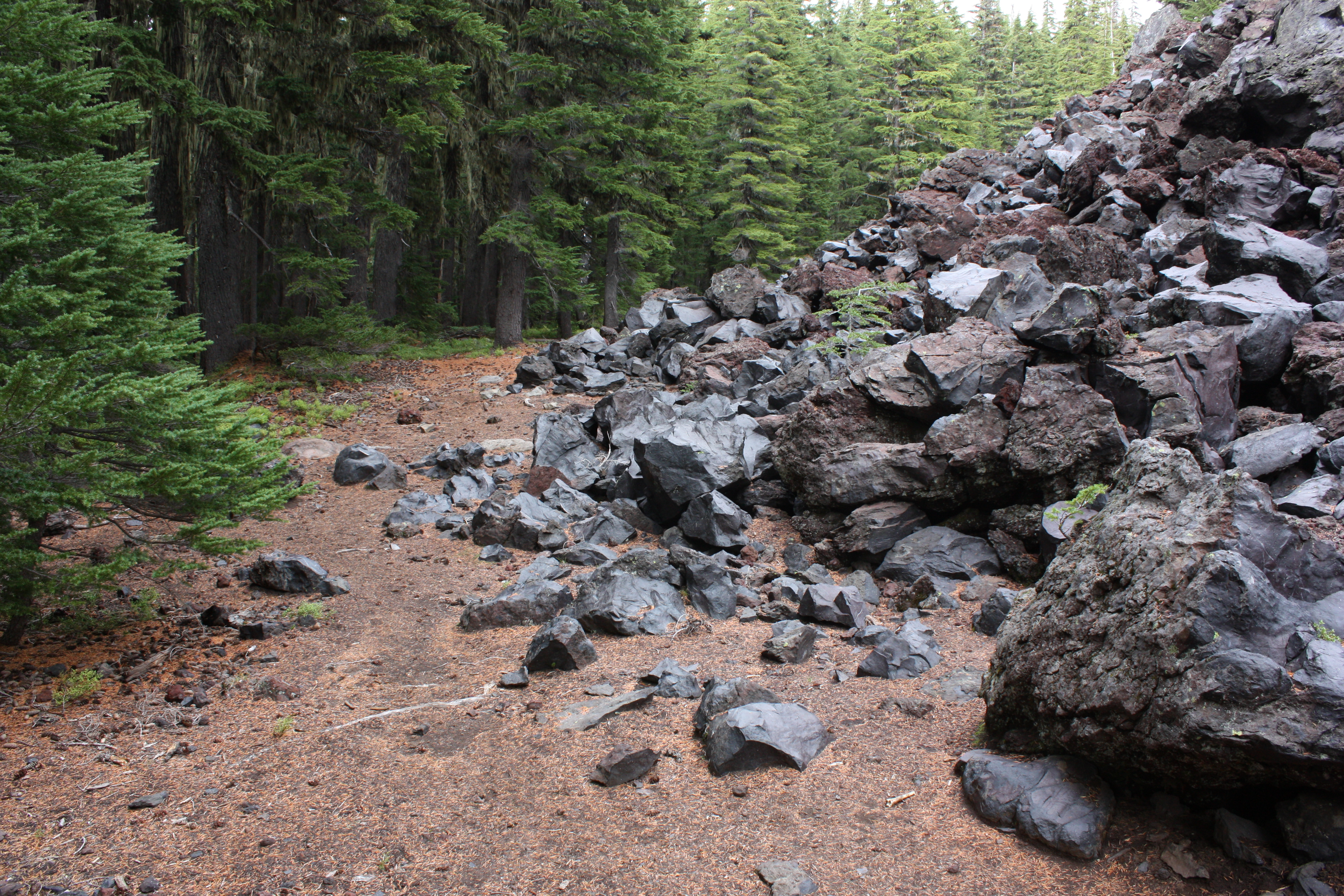
Basaltic andesite in the Cascade Range

Basaltic andesite is found in volcanic arcs, such as those of Central America, the Andes of South America, and the Cascades of North America.

Basaltic andesite is also common where the Earth's crust is undergoing extension. For example, mid-Cenozoic volcanic sequences in western Mexico, southwestern New Mexico, and southeastern Arizona are capped by basaltic andesite of the Southern Cordilleran Basaltic Andesite (SCORBA) suite, which may be the most extensive Cenozoic mafic suite in North America. Mount Mazama, a large composite volcano in south-central Oregon, consists of several overlapping basaltic andesite shields.

Basaltic andesite is a component of back-arc basin basalt suites. The Columbia River Basalt Group is composed of 80% basaltic andesites on the basis of silicon content.

Thick sequences of basaltic andesites were erupted in a shallow-marine environment during the Paleoproterozoic as melts formed in the anomalous Kaapval craton lithosphere.

The Mars Global Surveyor has found evidence for basaltic andesite on Mars.
