= Volcanic field =

Area of Earth's crust prone to localized volcanic activity

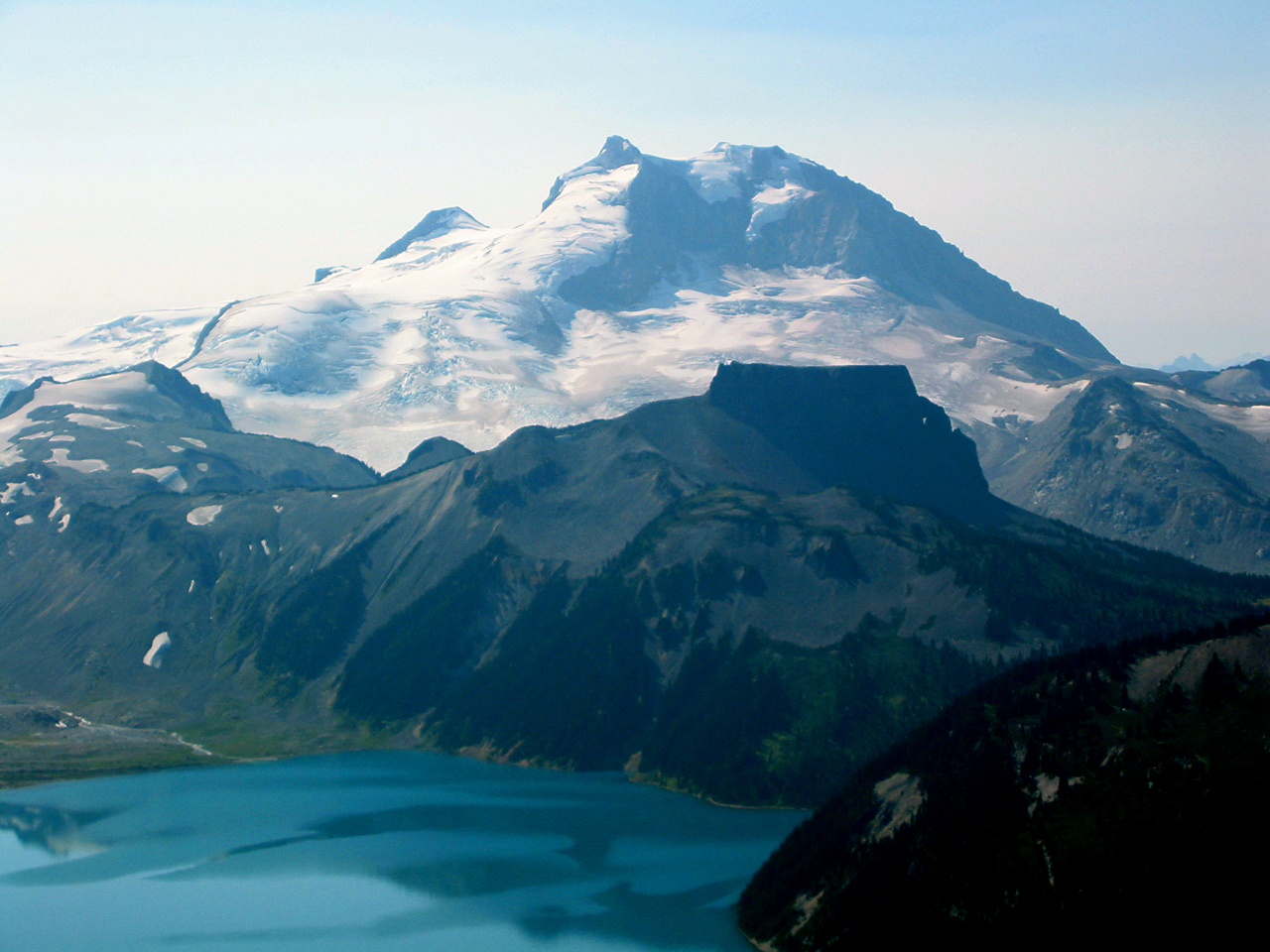
The north face of Mount Garibaldi rises above The Table and Garibaldi Lake in the Garibaldi Lake volcanic field

A volcanic field is an area of Earth's crust that is prone to localized volcanic activity. The type and number of volcanoes required to be called a "field" is not well-defined. Volcanic fields usually consist of clusters of up to 100 volcanoes such as cinder cones. Lava flows may also occur. They may occur as a monogenetic volcanic field or a polygenetic volcanic field.

== Description ==
Alexander von Humboldt observed in 1823 that geologically young volcanoes are not distributed uniformly across the Earth's surface, but tend to be clustered into specific regions. Young volcanoes are rarely found within cratons, but are characteristic of subduction zones, rift zones, or in ocean basins. Intraplate volcanoes are clustered along hotspot traces.

Within regions of volcanic activity, volcanic fields are clusters of volcanoes that share a common magma source. Unlike a large volcano with satellite or subsidiary vents, a volcanic field's vents have their own source of magma, possibly of different compositions (such as basalt and rhyolite), and these vents may span an area of thousands of square miles. Scoria cones are particularly prone to cluster into volcanic fields, which are typically 30–80 kilometers (19–50 miles) in diameter and consist of several tens to several hundred individual cones. The unusually large Trans-Mexican Volcanic Belt has nearly 1000 cones covering an area of 60,000 square kilometers (23,000 sq mi).

== Examples ==
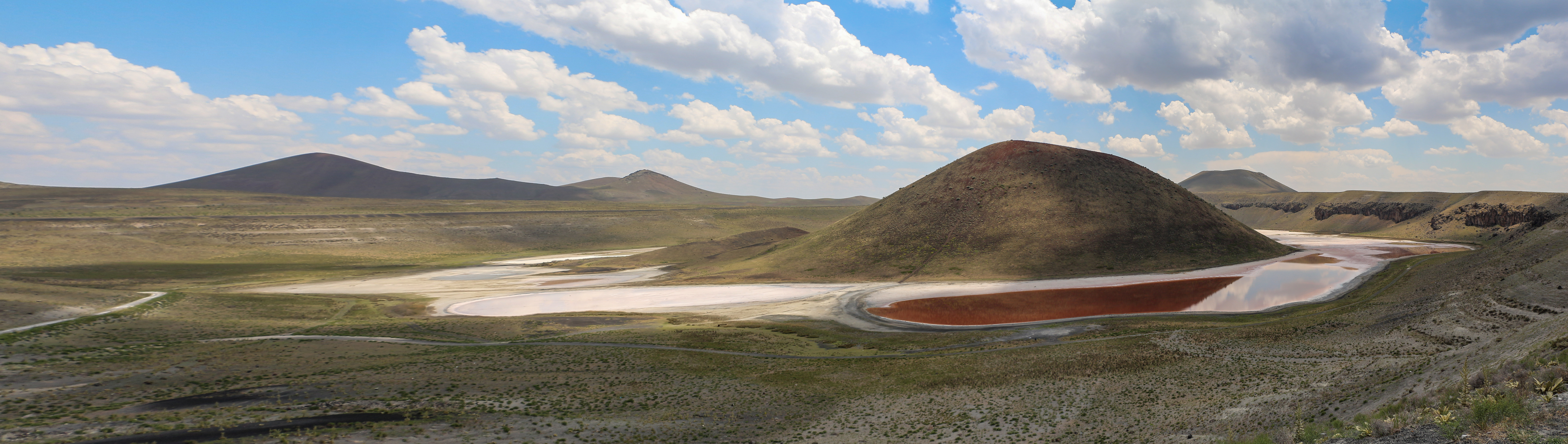
Karapınar Field in Turkey

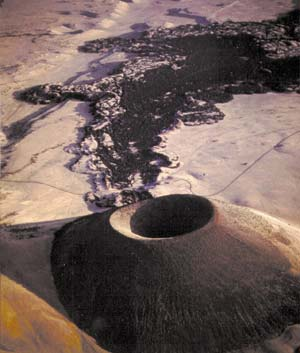
SP Crater in the San Francisco volcanic field is a cinder cone with a basalt lava flow that extends for 4 miles (6 km).

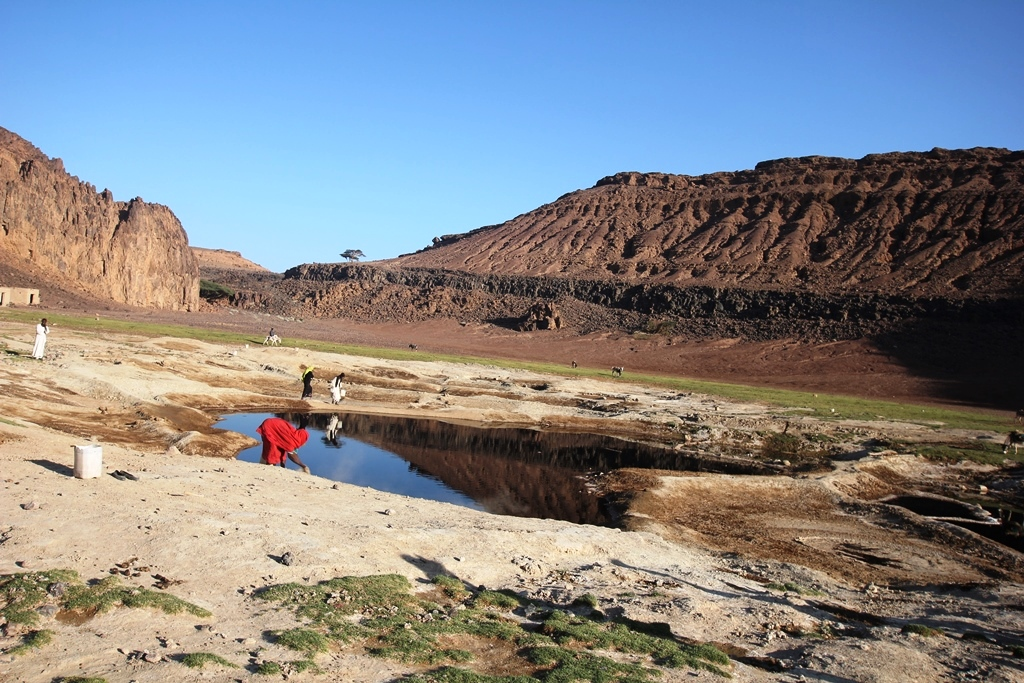
El Muweilih Crater in Sudan with natron-rich clay on the crater floor

=== Canada ===
- Atlin Volcanic Field, British Columbia
- Desolation Lava Field, British Columbia
- Garibaldi Lake volcanic field, British Columbia
- Mount Cayley volcanic field, British Columbia
- Snowshoe Lava Field, British Columbia
- Tuya Volcanic Field, British Columbia
- Wells Gray-Clearwater volcanic field, British Columbia
- Wrangell Volcanic Field, Yukon Territory

=== Mexico ===
- San Quintín Volcanic Field, Baja California
- Durango volcanic field, Durango

=== United States ===
- Boring Lava Field, Oregon
- Central Colorado volcanic field, Colorado
- Clear Lake Volcanic Field, California
- Coso Volcanic Field, California
- Indian Heaven, Washington
- Jemez Mountains, New Mexico
- Latir volcanic field, New Mexico
- Marysvale Volcanic Field, Utah
- Raton-Clayton volcanic field, New Mexico
- San Bernardino Volcanic Field, Arizona
- San Francisco volcanic field, Arizona
- San Juan volcanic field, Colorado
- Taos Plateau volcanic field, Taos County, New Mexico
- Trans-Pecos Volcanic Field, Texas
- Wrangell Volcanic Field, Alaska

=== Iceland ===
- Sundhnúkur crater row, Reykjanes Peninsula
- Central Highlands volcanic field
- Vatnajökull volcanic field, South Highlands
- Eyjafjallajökull caldera, South Highlands
- Ódáðahraun lava-field
- Oddnýjarhnjúkur-Langjökull volcanic field
- Krýsuvík volcanic field
- Laugahraun volcanic field

=== Africa ===
- Atakor volcanic field, Algeria
- Bayuda Volcanic Field, Sudan
- Haruj, Fezzan, Libya
- In Teria volcanic field, Algeria
- Manzaz volcanic field, Algeria
- Meidob Volcanic Field, Sudan
- Nemours-Nedroma, Algeria
- Oujda volcanic field, Morocco
- Oulmés volcanic field, Morocco
- Rekkame volcanic field, Morocco
- Todra volcanic field, Niger

=== Others ===
- Aguas Zarcas volcanic field, Alajuela, Costa Rica
- Antofagasta de la Sierra volcanic field, Antofagasta de la Sierra Department, Catamarca Province, Argentina
- Auckland volcanic field, North Island, New Zealand
- Tawau volcanic field, Sabah, Malaysia
- Central Skåne Volcanic Province, Sweden
- Chaîne des Puys, Auvergne, France
- Cu-Lao Re Group, Vietnam
- Laguna Volcanic Field, Philippines
- Newer Volcanics Province, Australia
- Vulkan Eifel, Germany
- Jeju Island, South Korea

== See also ==
- Lava field
- Volcanic arc
- Volcanic belt
- Volcanic group
- Volcanic island
