= Active volcano =

Geological feature

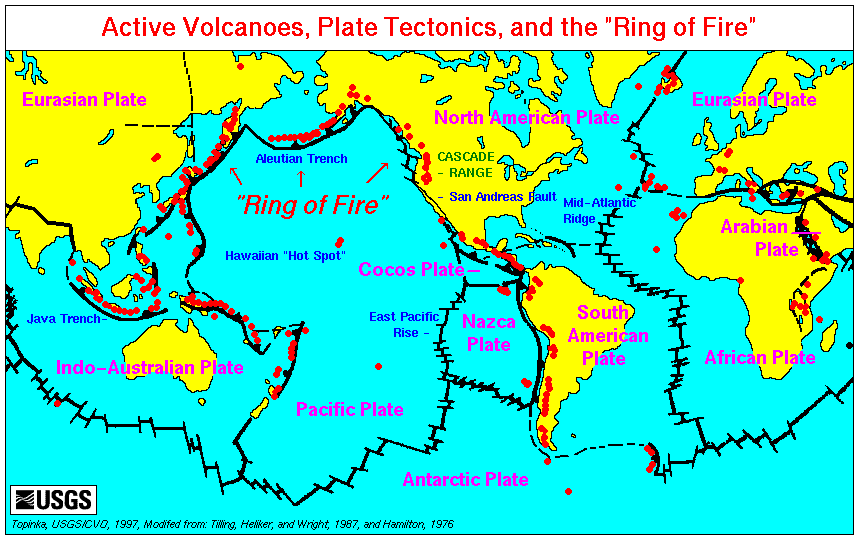
World map of active volcanoes and plate boundaries

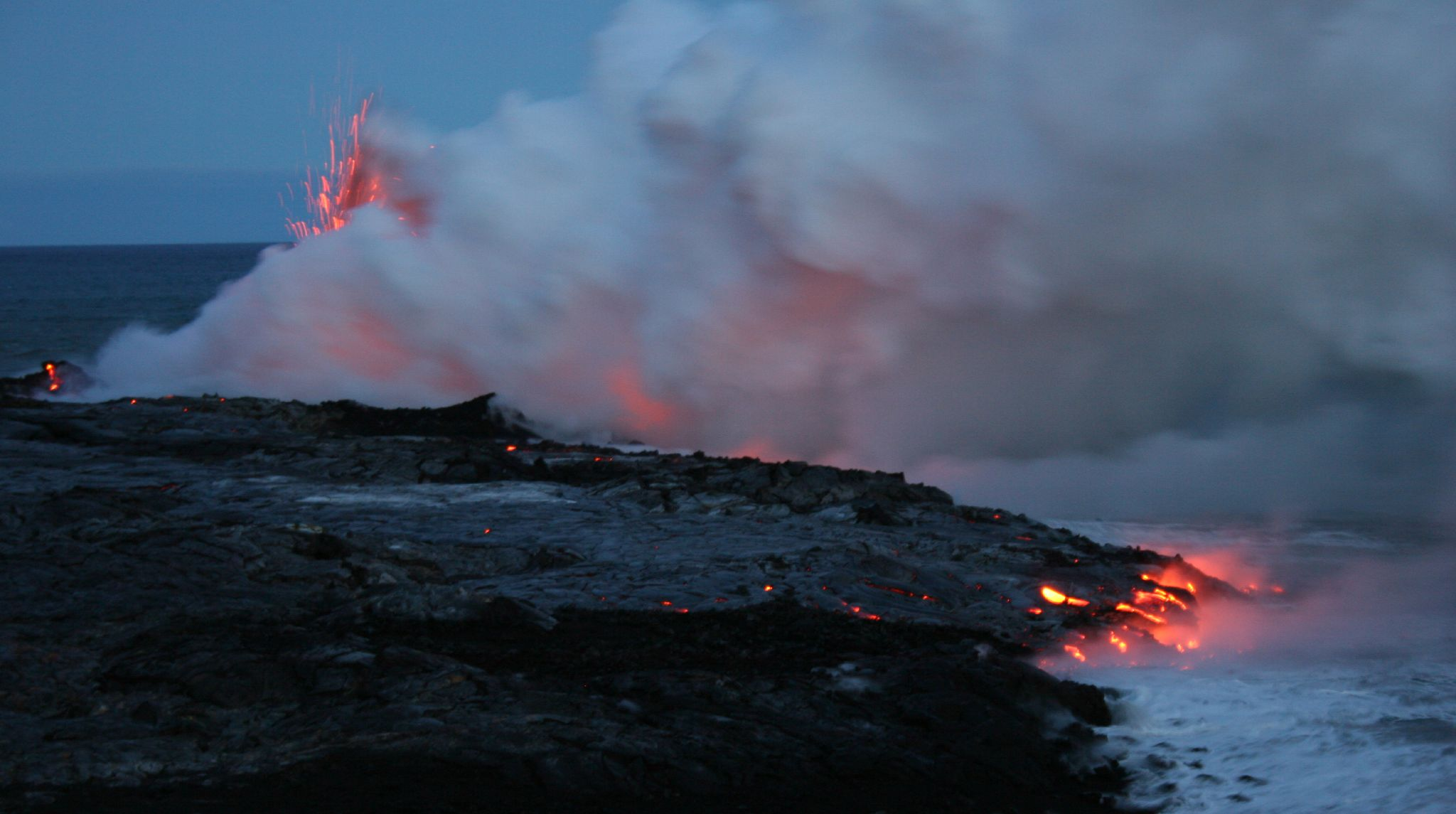
Kīlauea's lava entering the sea

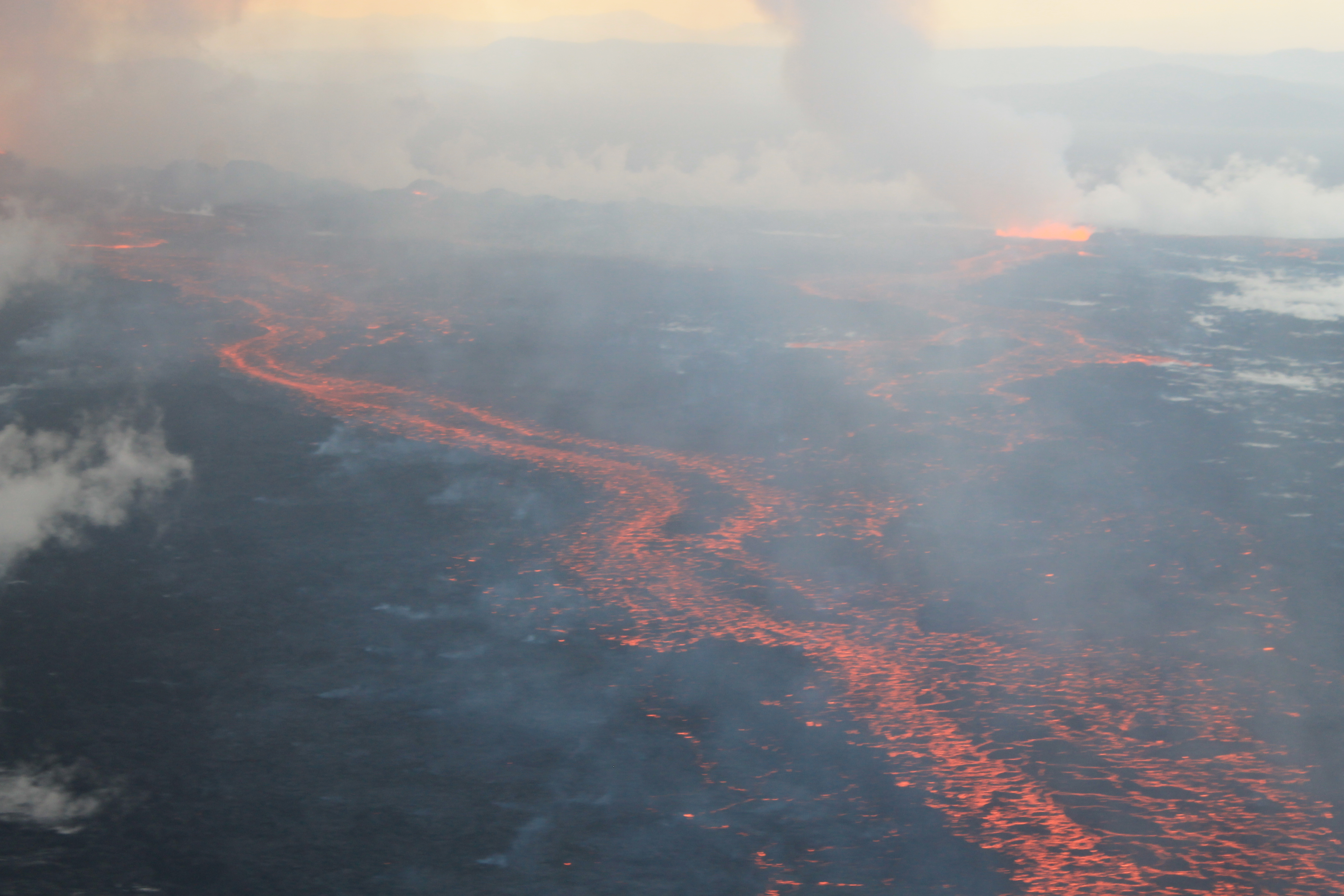
Lava flows at Holuhraun, Iceland, September 2014

An active volcano is a volcano that is currently erupting, or has the potential to erupt in the future. Conventionally it is applied to any that have erupted during the Holocene (the current geologic epoch that began approximately 11,700 years ago). A volcano that is not currently erupting but could erupt in the future is also known as a dormant volcano. Volcanoes that will not erupt again, or are thought to never erupt again, are known as extinct volcanoes.

== Overview ==
There are 1,650 potentially active volcanoes around the world, 500 of which have erupted in historical time. Many active volcanoes are located along the Pacific Rim, also known as the Pacific Ring of Fire. An estimated 500 million people live near active volcanoes.

Historical time (or recorded history) is another timeframe for active. The span of recorded history differs from region to region. In China and the Mediterranean, it reaches back nearly 3,000 years, but in the Pacific Northwest of the United States and Canada, it reaches back less than 300 years, and in Hawaii and New Zealand it is only around 200 years. The incomplete Catalogue of the Active Volcanoes of the World, published in parts between 1951 and 1975 by the International Association of Volcanology, uses this definition, by which there are more than 500 active volcanoes. As of March 2021, the Smithsonian Institution's Global Volcanism Program recognizes 560 volcanoes with confirmed historical eruptions.

Countries with the most Holocene volcanoes, according to the Smithsonian Institution's Global Volcanism Program (as of 2023):

1. United States: 165
2. Japan: 122
3. Russia: 117
4. Indonesia 117
5. Chile: 91

Countries with the most volcanoes active since 1960 (as of 2023):

1. Indonesia: 55
2. Japan: 40
3. US: 39 (mostly volcanic areas in and around Hawaii, Alaska, California, Oregon, Washington State and Pacific territories)
4. Russia: 27
5. Chile: 19
6. Papua New Guinea: 13
7. Ecuador: 12

As of 2025, the following are considered Earth's most active volcanoes:

- Kīlauea, the famous Hawaiian volcano, was in nearly continuous, effusive eruption (in which lava steadily flows onto the ground) between 1983 through 2018, and had the longest-observed lava lake.
- Mount Etna and nearby Stromboli, two Mediterranean volcanoes.
- Piton de la Fournaise, in Réunion, erupts frequently enough to be a tourist attraction.

Other highly active volcanoes include:

- Mauna Loa in Hawaii is the largest active volcano in the world. Its summit is more than 4 kilometers (2.5 mi) above sea level, and 17 kilometers (11 mi) above its base in the sea floor.
- Mount Nyiragongo and its neighbor, Nyamuragira, are Africa's most active volcanoes.
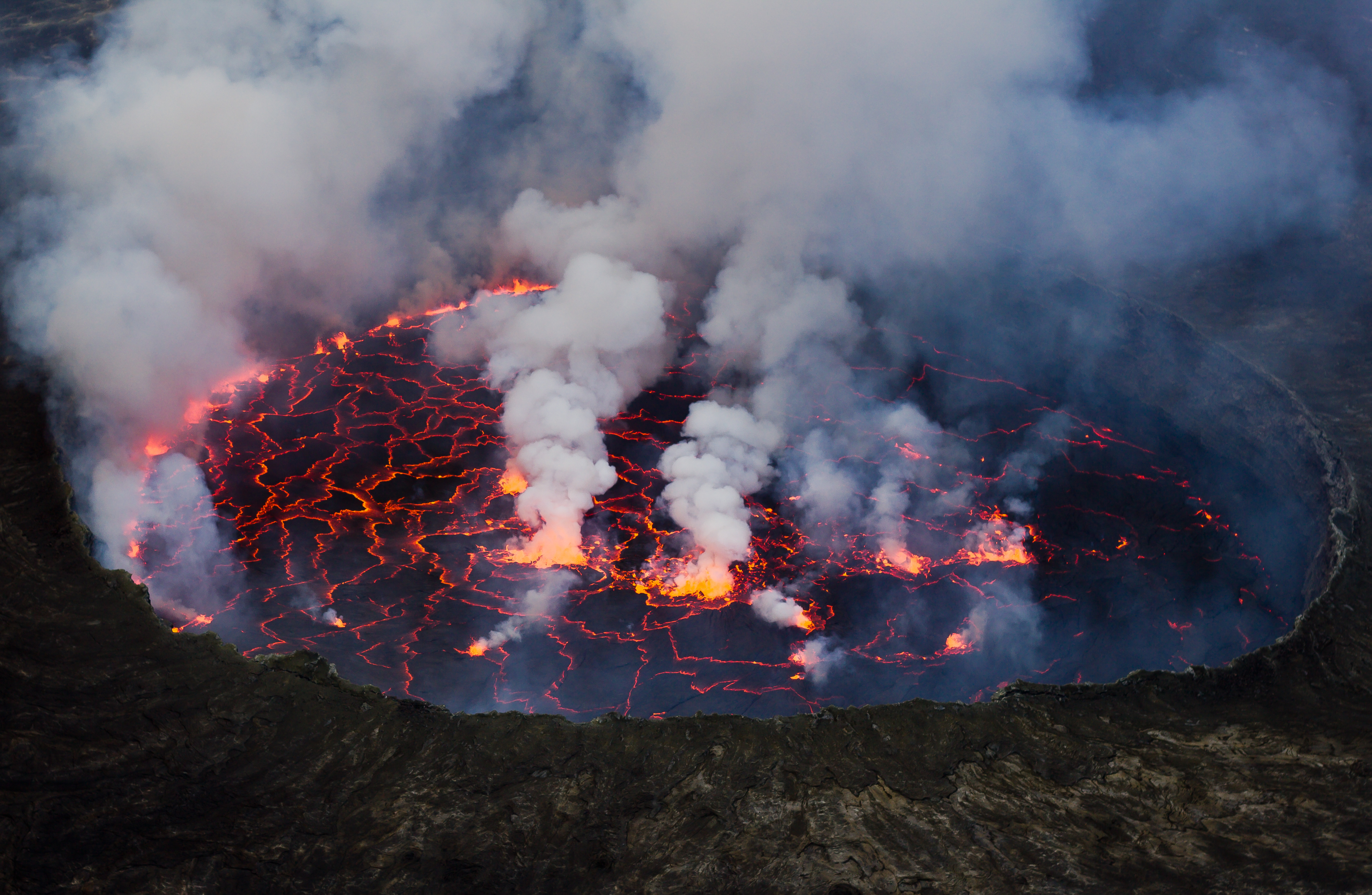
  Nyiragongo's lava lake
- Erta Ale, in the Afar Triangle, has maintained a lava lake since at least 1906.
- Mount Erebus, in Antarctica, has maintained a lava lake since at least 1972.
- Mount Merapi
- Whakaari / White Island, has been in a continuous state of releasing volcanic gas since before European observation in 1769.
- Ol Doinyo Lengai
- Mount Ibu, a stratovolcano in Indonesia. Constant volcanic eruptions since 2012.
- Ambrym
- Barren Island (Andaman Islands)
- Sangay
- Arenal Volcano
- Pacaya
- Klyuchevskaya Sopka
- Sheveluch
- Semeru

Holocene volcanoes with large populations within 5 km (3.1 mi):

Michoacan-Guanajuato volcano in Mexico and Tatun Volcanic Group in Taiwan both have more than 5 million people living within 5 kilometers (3.1 mi) of the volcano. Campi Flegrei in Italy and Ilopango in El Salvador both have populations of over 2 million people living within 5 kilometers (3.1 mi) of the volcanoes. Hainan Volcanic Field in China, San Pablo Volcanic Field in the Philippines, Ghegham Volcanic Ridge in Armenia, Dieng Volcanic Complex, in Indonesia, and Auckland Volcanic Field in New Zealand all have over 1 million people living within 5 kilometers (3.1 mi) of each volcano.

== By country ==
=== Argentina ===
Argentina is part of the Andes Mountains volcanic belt along the western South American Pacific coast. These volcanoes are a result of subduction, where the Nazca Plate is subducting below the South American Plate. The following list are active/dormant volcanoes in Argentina:

- Aracar, a Stratovolcano
- Arizaro volcanic field, a volcanic field
- Cerro Bayo, a stratovolcano
- Cerro Blanco (volcano), a caldera
- Cerro de los Chenques, a volcanic field
- Cerro El Cóndor, a stratovolcano
- Cerro Escorial, a stratovolcano
- Cerro Torta, a lava dome
- Cerro Tuzgle, a stratovolcano
- Cerro Volcánico, a stratovolcano
- Copahue, a stratovolcano
- Corrida de Cori, a stratovolcano
- Cueros de Purulla, a lava dome
- Falso Azufre, a stratovolcano
- Huanquihue Group, a group of stratovolcanoes
- Infiernillo (volcanic field), a volcanic field
- Lanín, a stratovolcano
- Lastarria, a stratovolcano
- Llullaillaco, a stratovolcano
- Los Gemelos-El Saladillo, a volcano field
- Maipo (volcano). a stratovolcano
- Negro de Chorrillos, a volcano field
- Pali-Aike volcanic field, a volcano field
- Pasto Ventura, a volcano field
- Payún Matrú, a shield volcano
- Peinado, a stratovolcano
- Planchón-Peteroa, a stratovolcano
- Puesto Cortaderas, a maar volcano
- San Jerónimo volcano, a volcano field
- Socompa, a stratovolcano
- Tipas, a stratovolcano
- Tromen, a stratovolcano
- Viedma, a stratovolcano

=== Bolivia ===
- Cerro Chascon-Runtu Jarita complex, a lava dome
- Irruputuncu, a stratovolcano
- Jayu Quta (Ladislao Cabrera), a maar volcano
- Jorcada, a stratovolcano
- Michincha, a stratovolcano
- Nuevo Mundo volcano, a stratovolcano
- Olca, a stratovolcano
- Pampa Luxsar, a volcano field
- Parinacota (volcano), a stratovolcano
- Paruma, a stratovolcano
- Patilla Pata, a stratovolcano
- Pumiri, a stratovolcano
- Nevado Sajama, a stratovolcano
- Tata Sabaya, a stratovolcano
- Tocorpuri, a stratovolcano
- Uturuncu, a startovolcano

=== Chile ===
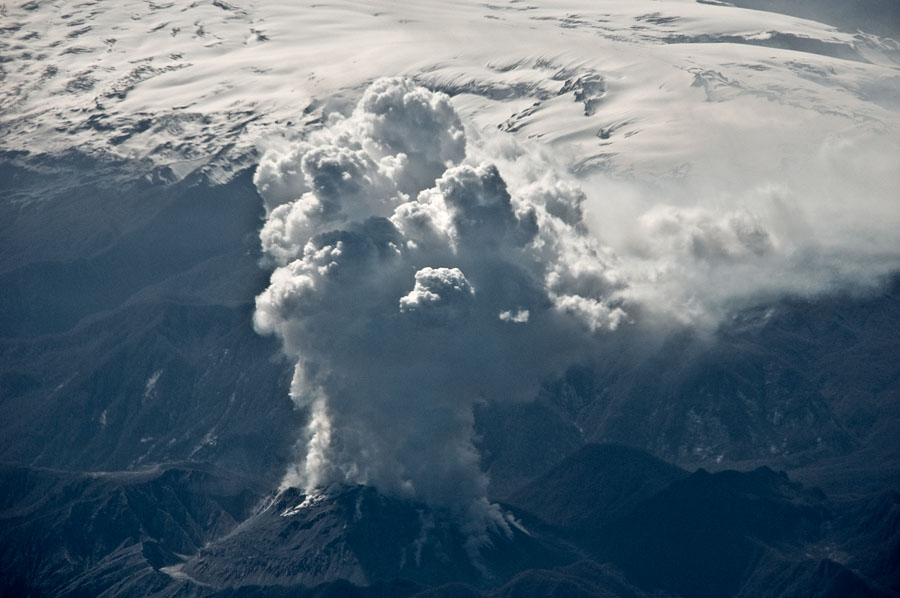
The venting lava dome taken in 2008 during Chaitens' eruption.

- Acotango, a stratovolcano
- Aguilera, a stratovolcano
- Purico complex, a complex volcano
- Antillanca Group, a volcano field
- Antuco (volcano), a stratovolcano
- Apacheta-Aguilucho volcanic complex, a volcano field
- Arintica, a stratovolcano
- Aucanquilcha, a stratovolcano
- Monte Burney, a stratovolcano
- Caburgua-Huelemolle, a stratovolcano
- Calabozos, a caldera
- Calbuco (volcano), a stratovolcano
- Cerro Arenales, a stratovolcano
- Callaqui, a stratovolcano
- Carrán-Los Venados, a maar volcano
- Cerro Ascotan, a stratovolcano
- Cerro Azul (Chile volcano), a stratovolcano
- Cerro del Azufre, a stratovolcano
- Toconce (volcano), a stratovolcano
- Cerro Tujle, a volcano field
- Chaitén (volcano), a stratovolcano
- Colachi, a stratovolcano
- Corcovado Volcano, a stratovolcano
- Cordón de Puntas Negras, a stratovolcano
- Cordón del Azufre, a stratovolcano
- Descabezado Grande, a stratovolcano
- Falso Azufre, a stratovolcano
- Fueguino, a volcano field
- Guayaques, a rhyolite lava dome
- Hornopirén (volcano), a stratovolcano
- Huequi, a stratovolcano
- Isluga, a stratovolcano
- Laguna del Maule (volcano), a volcano field
- Lanín, a stratovolcano
- Lascar (volcano), a stratovolcano
- Licancabur, a stratovolcano
- Nevado de Longaví, a stratovolcano
- Lonquimay (volcano), a stratovolcano
- Llaima, a stratovolcano
- Cerro Macá, a stratovolcano
- Melimoyu, a stratovolcano
- Puyehue-Cordón Caulle, a stratovolcano
- Mentolat, a caldera
- Michinmahuida, a stratovolcano
- Mocho-Choshuenco, a stratovolcano
- Hudson Volcano, a stratovolcano
- Nevados de Chillán, a group of stratovolcanoes
- Ojos del Salado, a complex volcano
- Olca-Paruma, a volcanic complex
- Osorno (volcano), a stratovolcano
- Pali-Aike volcanic field. a volcano field
- Palomo, a stratovolcano
- Parinacota (volcano), a stratovolcano
- Puntiagudo-Cordón Cenizos, a stratovolcano
- Purico complex, a volcano field
- Volcán Putana, a stratovolcano
- Puyuhuapi (volcanic group), a volcano field
- Quetrupillán, a stratovolcano
- Reclus (volcano), a stratovolcano
- Resago, a cinder cone
- Sairecabur, a stratovolcano
- San José (volcano), a stratovolcano
- San Pedro (Chile volcano), a stratovolcano
- San Pedro de Tatara, a stratovolcano
- Sierra Nevada (stratovolcano), a stratovolcano
- Socompa, a stratovolcano
- Sollipulli, a caldera
- Taapaca, a stratovolcano
- Tinguiririca Volcano, a stratovolcano
- Tolhuaca (volcano), a stratovolcano
- Tupungatito, a stratovolcano
- Villarrica (volcano), a stratovolcano
- Guallatiri, a stratovolcano
- Yanteles, a stratovolcano
- Yate (volcano), a stratovolcano

=== Colombia ===
- Azufral, a stratovolcano
- Cerro Bravo, a stratovolcano
- Cerro Machín, a stratovolcano
- Cerro Negro de Mayasquer, a stratovolcano
- Cumbal Volcano, a stratovolcano
- Doña Juana, a stratovolcano
- Galeras, a stratovolcano
- Nevado del Huila, a stratovolcano
- Nevado del Tolima, a stratovolcano
- Nevado del Ruiz, a stratovolcano
- Petacas, a lava dome
- Puracé, a stratovolcano
- Romeral (volcano), a stratovolcano
- Nevado de Santa Isabel, a shield volcano
- Sotará (volcano), a stratovolcano

=== Costa Rica ===
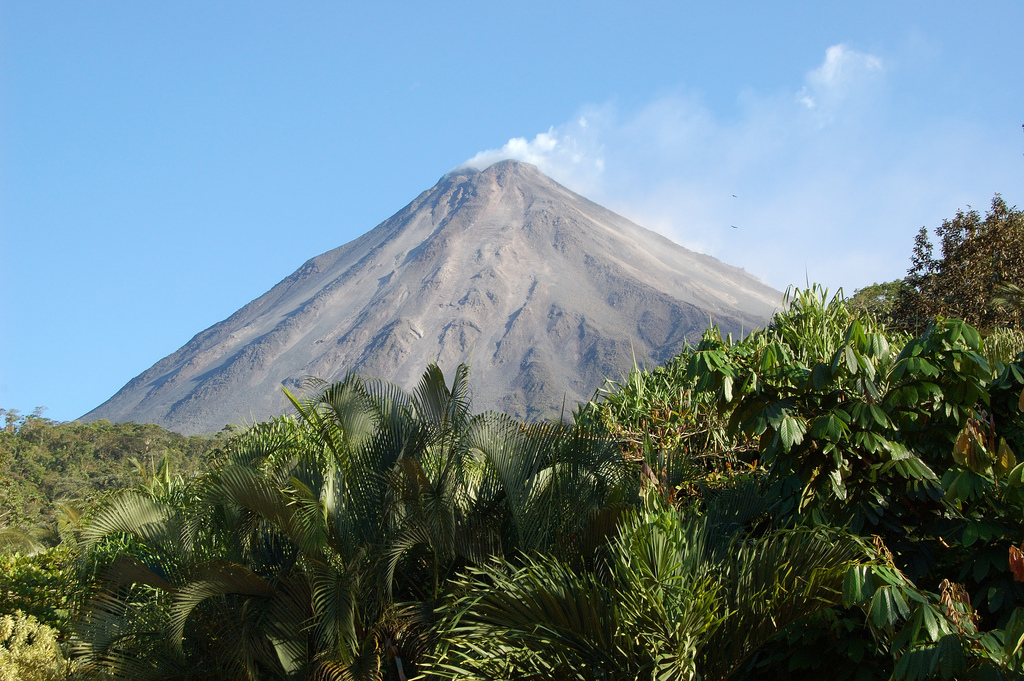
Arenal Volcano, Costa Rica

- Rincón de la Vieja, a stratovolcano
- Arenal, a stratovolcano
- Poás, a stratovolcano
- Irazu, a stratovolcano
- Turrialba, a stratovolcano

=== Ecuador ===
- Antisana, a stratovolcano
- Atacazo, a stratovolcano
- Cayambe (volcano), a complex volcano
- Chacana, a caldera
- Chiles (volcano), a stratovolcano
- Chimborazo, a stratovolcano
- Corazón (volcano), a stratovolcano
- Cotacachi Volcano, a stratovolcano
- Cotopaxi, a stratovolcano
- Cuicocha, a caldera
- Mojanda, a stratovolcano
- Aliso (volcano), a stratovolcano
- Pichincha (volcano), a stratovolcano
- Pilavo, a shield volcano
- Pululahua, a stratovolcano
- Quilotoa, a caldera
- Reventador, a stratovolcano
- Sangay, a stratovolcano
- Sincholagua Volcano, a stratovolcano
- Soche, a stratovolcano
- Sumaco, a stratovolcano
- Licto volcanic field, a volcano field
- Tungurahua, a stratovolcano
- Yanaurcu (Ecuador), a lava dome

The Galapagos Islands (Ecuador)

- La Cumbre (Galápagos Islands). a shield volcano
- Volcán Wolf, a shield volcano
- Sierra Negra (Galápagos), a shield volcano
- Cerro Azul (Ecuador volcano), a shield volcano
- Alcedo Volcano, a shiled volcano
- Marchena Island, a shield volcano
- Pinta Island, a shield volcano
- Santiago Island (Galápagos), a shield volcano
- Volcán Darwin, a shield volcano
- Volcán Ecuador, a shield volcano

=== Greece ===
- Santorini caldera, a caldera
- Milos, a stratovolcano
- Methana, a lava dome
- Nisyros, a caldera
- Sousaki volcano, a stratovolcano

=== El Salvador ===
- Cordillera de Apaneca, a volcanic ridge
- Apastepeque Volcanic Field, a volcanic field
- Chingo, a stratovolcano
- Cerro Cinotepeque, a volcano field
- Chinameca (volcano), a stratovolcano
- Coatepeque Caldera, a caldera
- Guazapa (volcano), a stratovolcano
- Lake Ilopango, a caldera
- Izalco (volcano), a stratovolcano
- San Diego volcanic field, a volcanic field
- San Miguel (volcano), a stratovolcano, last erupted in 2022.
- San Salvador (volcano), a stratovolcano
- San Vicente (volcano), a stratovolcano
- Santa Ana Volcano, a stratovolcano
- Taburete, a stratovolcano
- Tecapa, a stratovolcano
- Usulután (volcano), a stratovolcano

=== Ethiopia ===
- Hayli Gubbi, a shield volcano

=== Guatemala ===
- Acatenango, a stratovolcano
- Atitlán, a stratovolcano
- Fuego, a stratovolcano
- Pacaya, a volcanic complex
- Santa María, a stratovolcano
- Tacaná, a stratovolcano

=== Honduras ===
- Tiger Island, a stratovolcano
- Isla Zacate Grande, a stratovolcano
- Lake Yojoa, a volcano field
- Utila, a shield volcano in the Caribbean Sea.

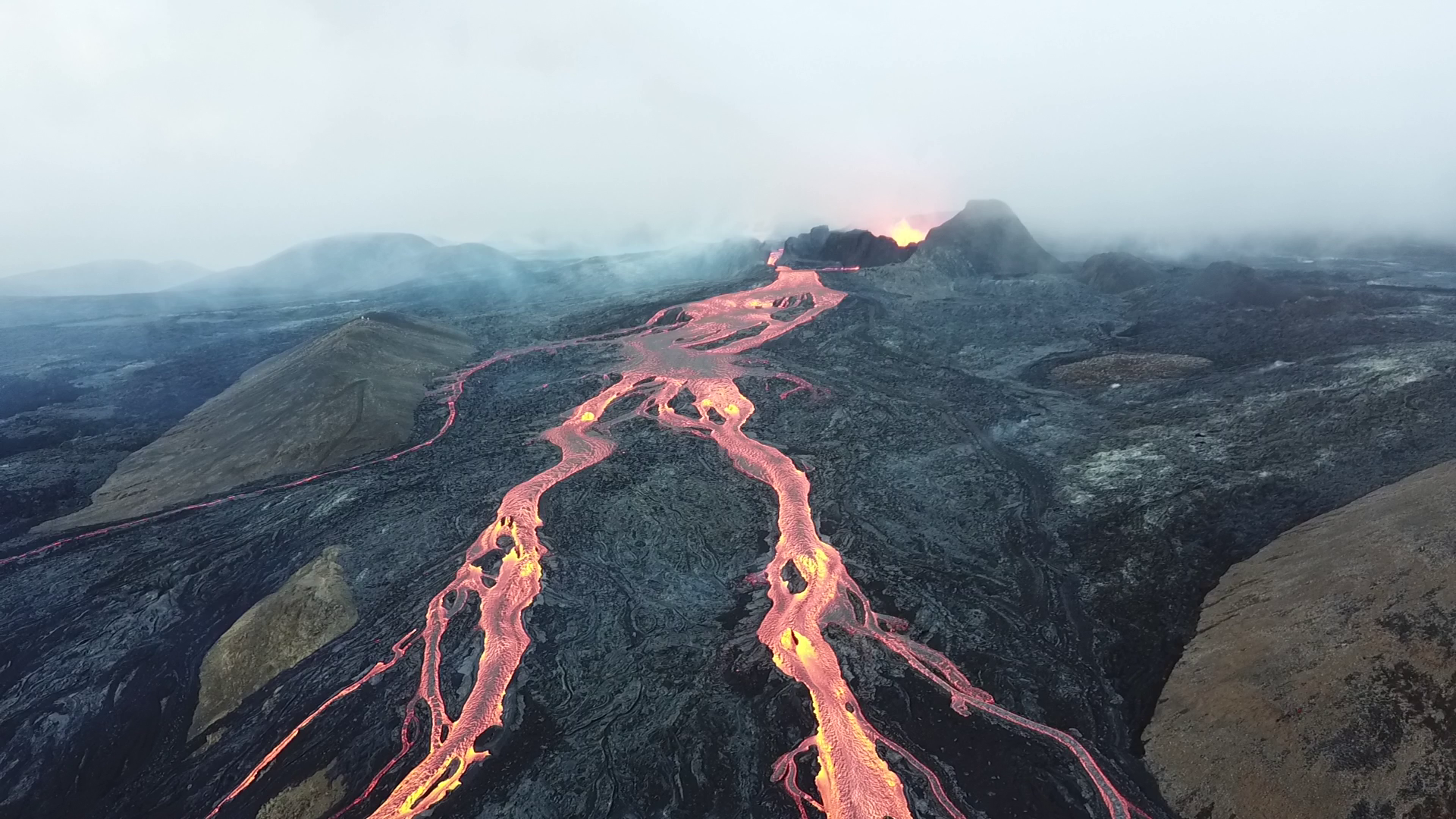
Iceland's Fagradalsfjall volcano

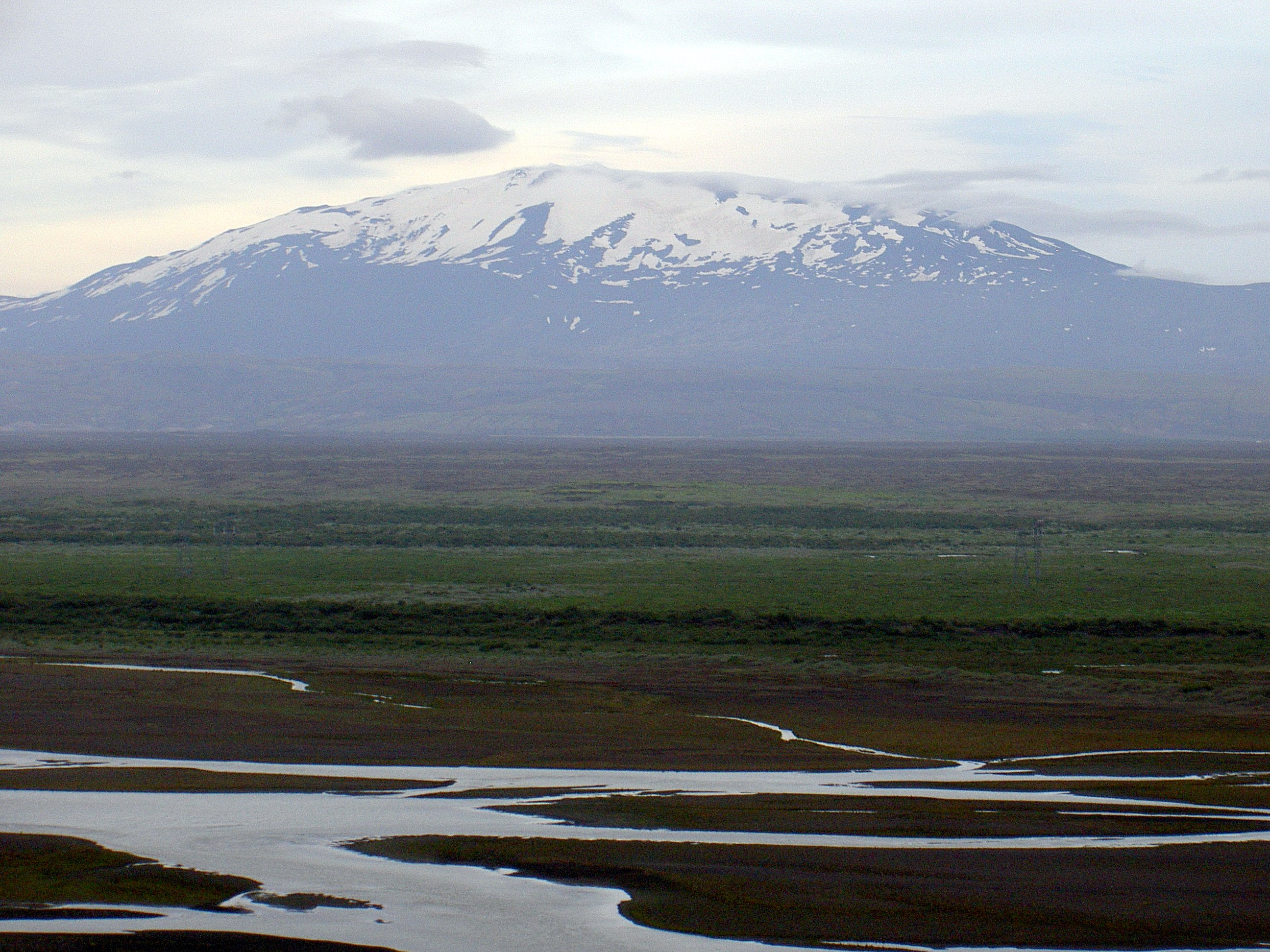
Hekla, stratovolcano in Iceland

=== Iceland ===
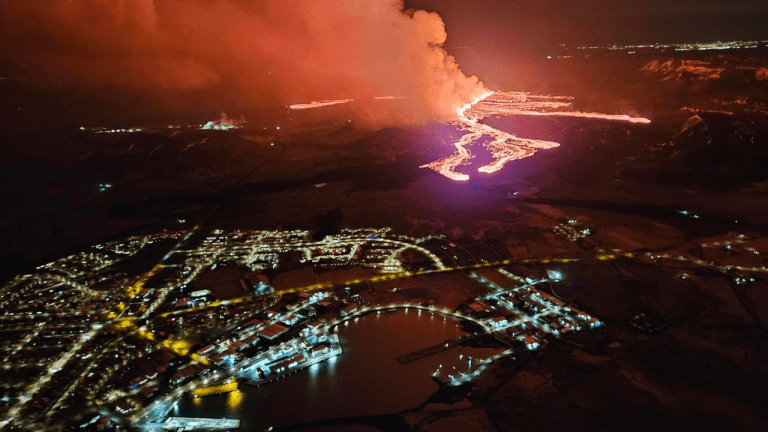
A fissure eruption of the Svartsengi system on March 16, 2024 in Iceland.

- Askja, a stratovolcano
- Bardarbunga, a stratovolcano
- Brennisteinsfjoll, crater rows
- Eldvörp–Svartsengi, fissure vents
- Eldey, fissure vent
- Esjufjoll, stratovolcano
- Eyjafjallajokull, stratovolcano
- Fagradalsfjall, fissure vents. Short and frequent eruptions between 2021 and 2023.
- Fremrinamar, stratovolcano
- Grimsnes, volcanic field
- Grimsvotn, caldera
- Heidarspordar, fissure vent
- Hekla, stratovolcano
- Helgrindur, volcanic field
- Hengill, crater rows
- Hofsjokull, fissure vent
- Hromundartindur, stratovolcano
- Katla, fissure vent
- Kolbeinsey Ridge, fissure vent
- Krafla, caldera
- Krysuvik-Trolladyngja, crater rows
- Kverkfjoll, stratovolcano
- Ljosufjoll, volcanic field
- Oddnyjarhnjukur-Langjokull, fissure vent
- Oraefajokull, stratovolcano
- Prestahnukur, fissure vent
- Reykjanes, crater rows
- Snaefell, stratovolcano
- Snaefellsjokull, stratovolcano
- Theistareykir, shield volcano
- Thordarhyrna, stratovolcano
- Tindfjallajokull, stratovolcano
- Tjornes fracture zone, fissure vent
- Torfajokull, stratovolcano
- Tungnafellsjokull, stratovolcano
- Vestmannaeyjar, fissure vents

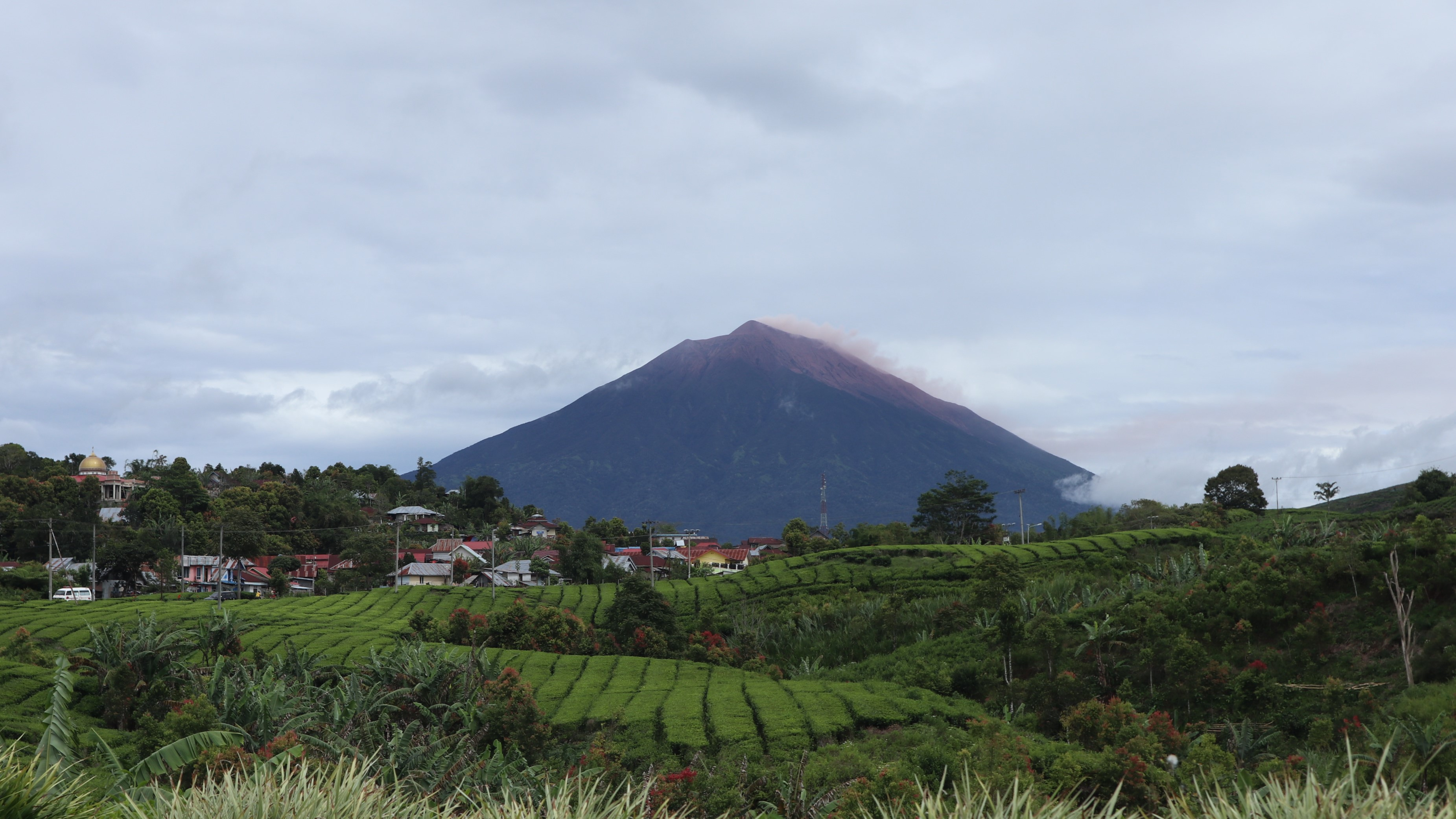
View of Mount Kerinci from the Kayu Aro plateau, Kerinci Regency, Jambi, Indonesia

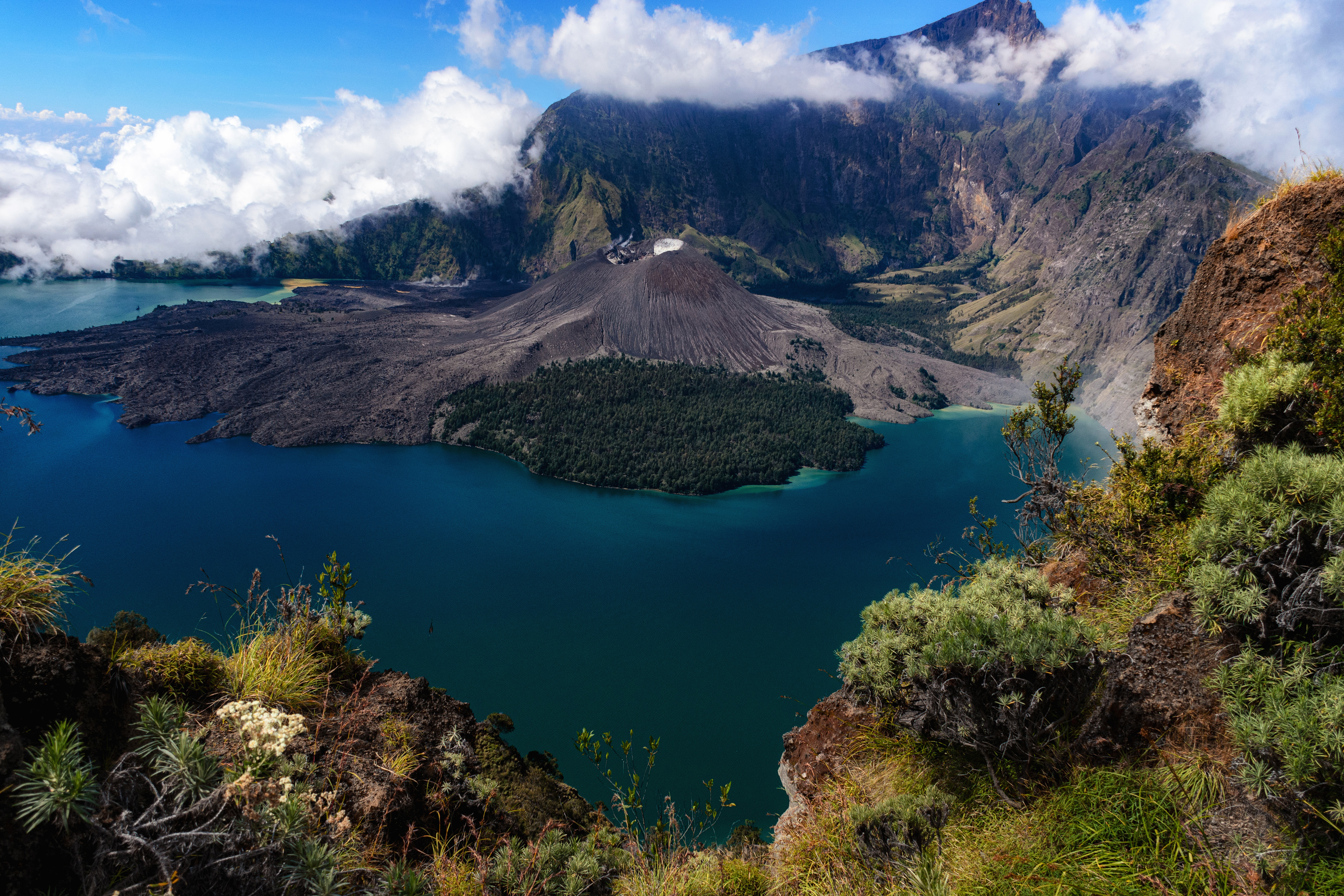
Mount Rinjani on the Lombok Island, West Nusa Tenggara Province, Indonesia

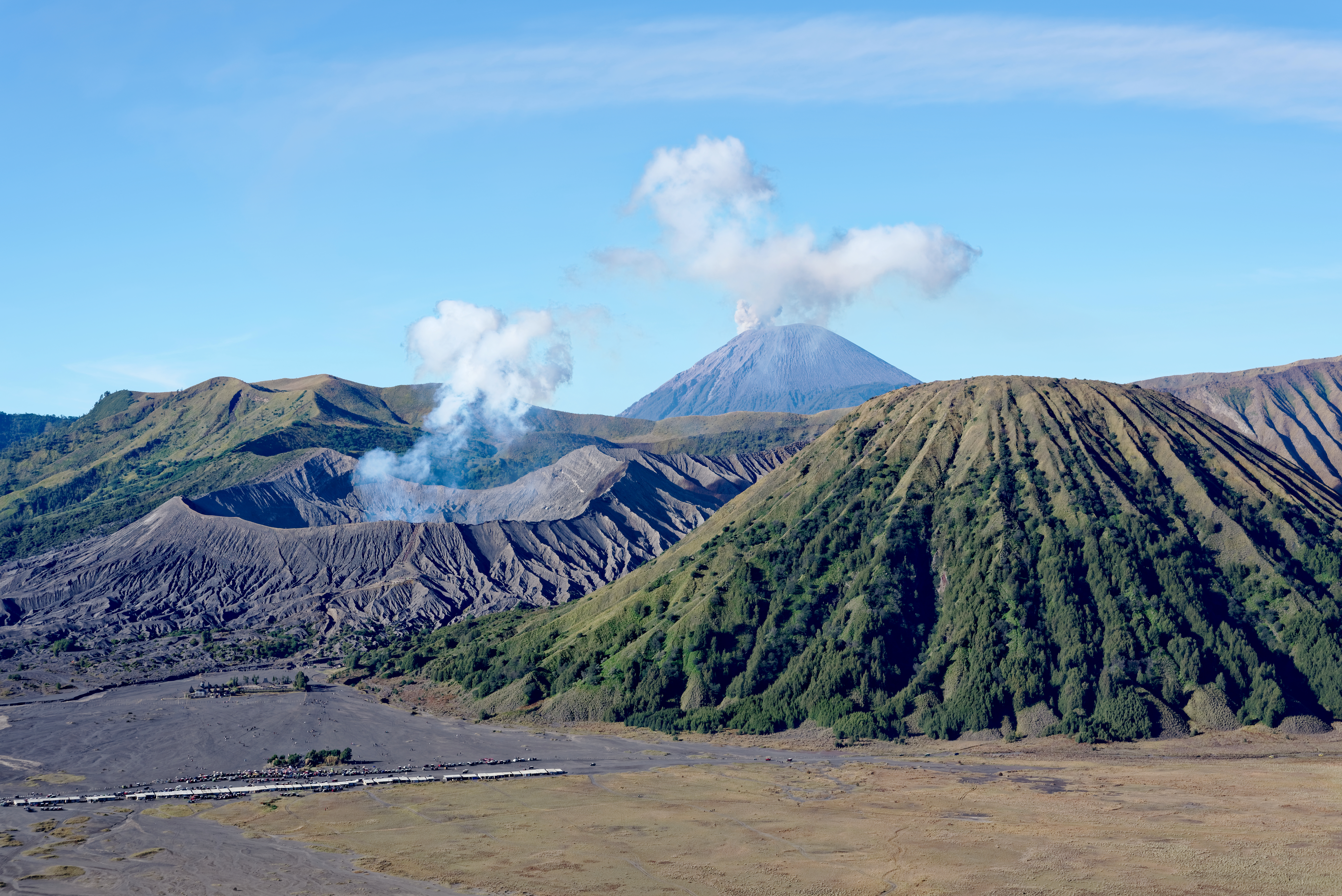
Mount Semeru and Bromo Tengger Semeru Park, East Java, Indonesia

=== Indonesia ===
Sumatera Island

- Mount Kerinci, a stratovolcano
- Weh Island, a volcanic island
- Seulawah Agam, a stratovolcano
- Peuët Sagoë, a volcanic complex
- Geureudong, a volcanic complex
- Lake Toba, a caldera lake

Sunda Strait and Java

- Semeru, a stratovolcano
- Krakatoa, a volcanic caldera
- Pulosari (volcano), a stratovolcano
- Gunung Karang, a stratovolcano
- Mount Salak, an eroded stratovolcano

Lesser Sunda Islands

- Mount Rinjani, a somma complex

Sumbawa

- Mount Tambora, a stratovolcano, the 1815 eruption was the largest in recorded history.

Sulawesi and Sangihe Islands

- Ambang, a volcano complex

Banda Sea

- Mount Wurlali, a stratovolcano

Halmahera

- Kie Matubu, a stratovolcano

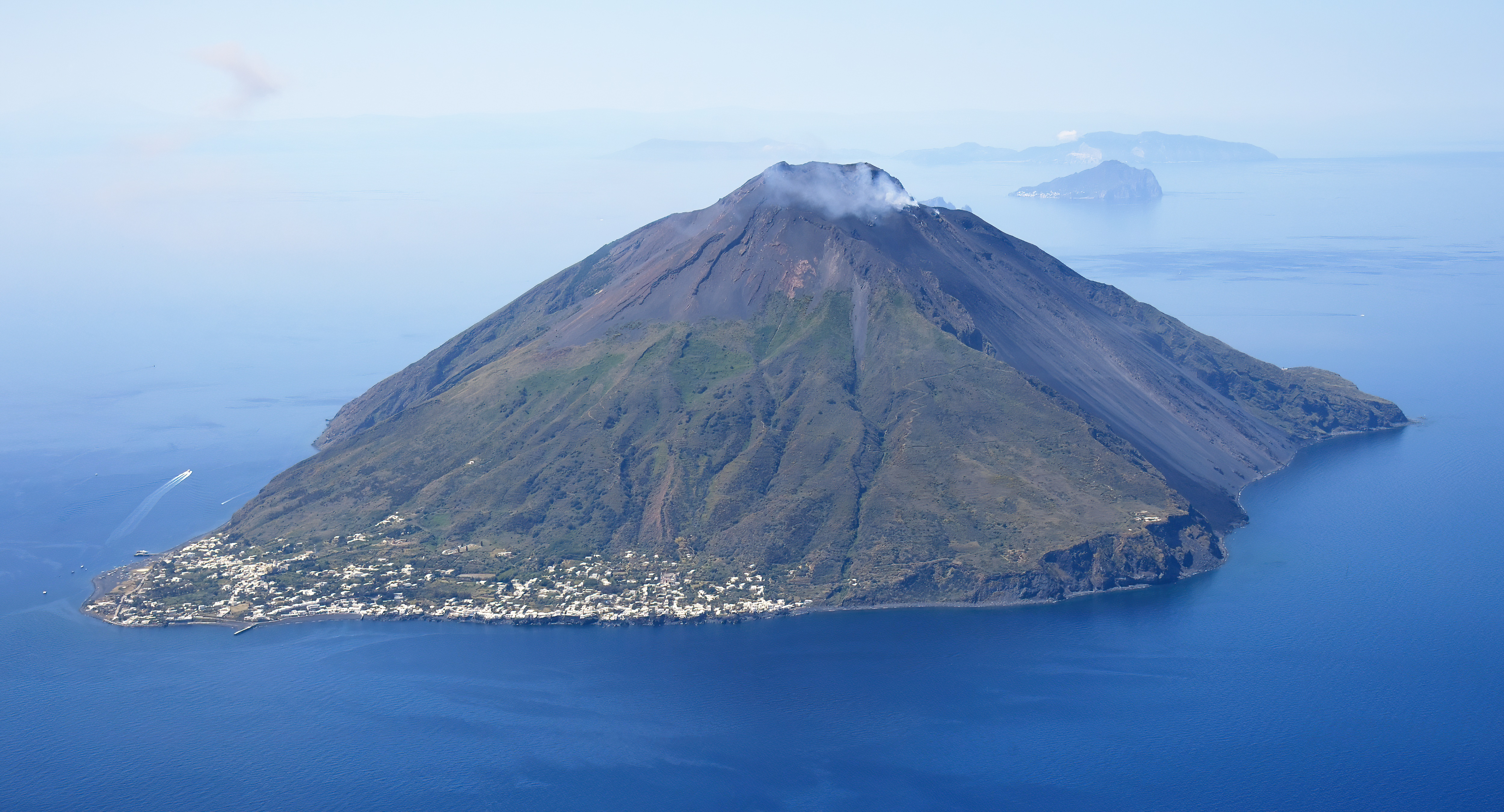
Aerial image of Stromboli (view from the northeast)

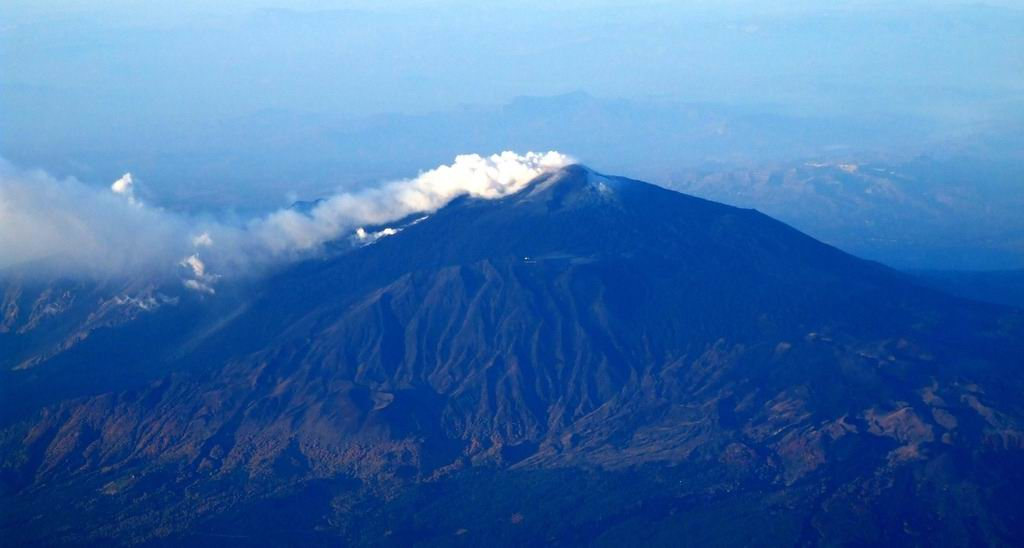
Mount Etna in Italy

=== Italy ===
- Campi Flegrei, a caldera
- Campi Flegrei del Mar di Sicilia, a volcanic field
- Colli Albani, a caldera
- Etna, a stratovolcano
- Ischia, a volcanic complex
- Lipari, a stratovolcano
- Marsili, a volcanic complex
- Palinuro, a volcanic compound
- Panarea, a stratovolcano
- Pantelleria, a shield volcano
- Stromboli, a stratovolcano
- Vesuvius, a stratovolcano
- Vulcano, a stratovolcano

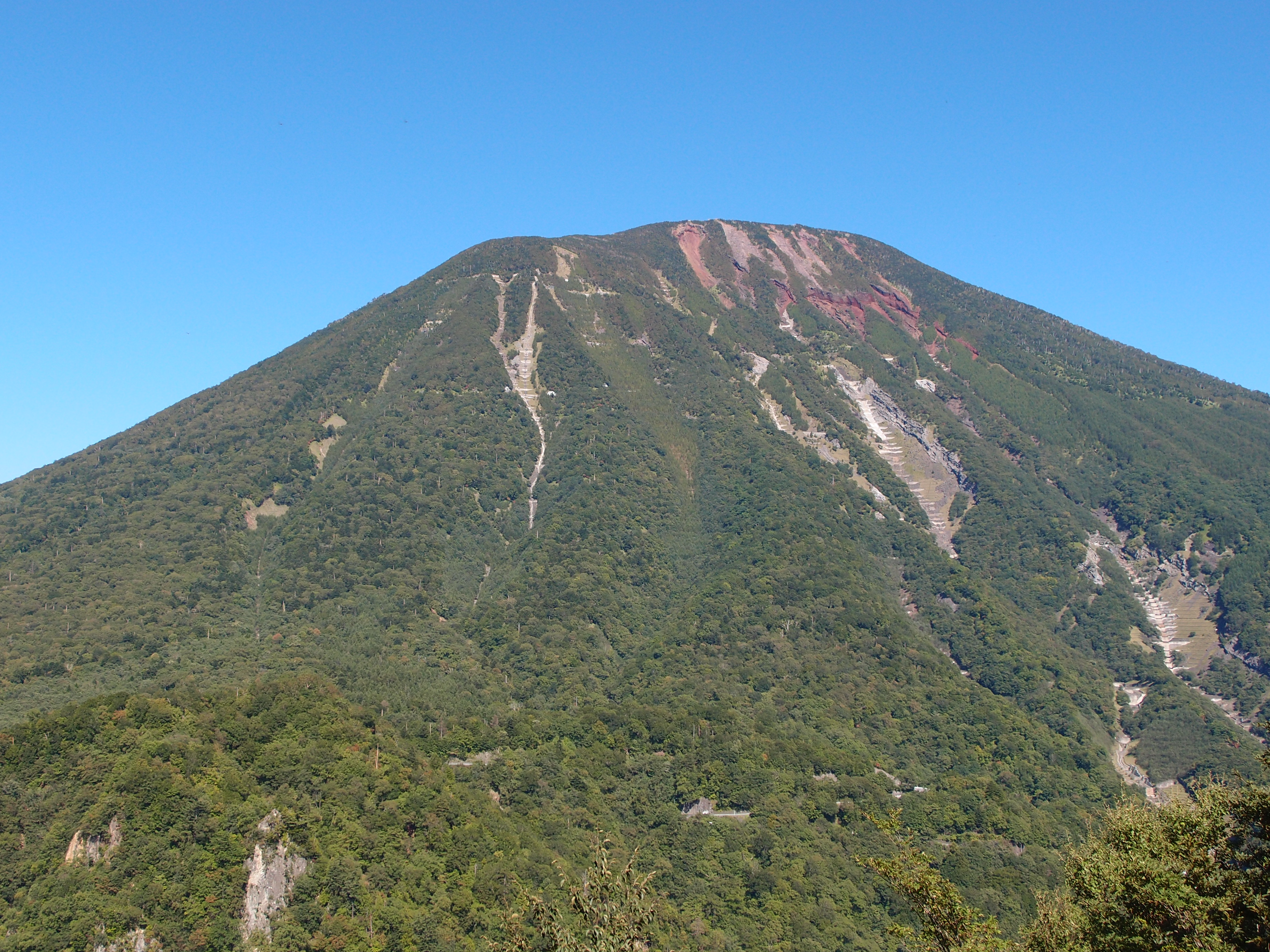
Nantai volcano, Tochigi-Nikko, Japan in 2013

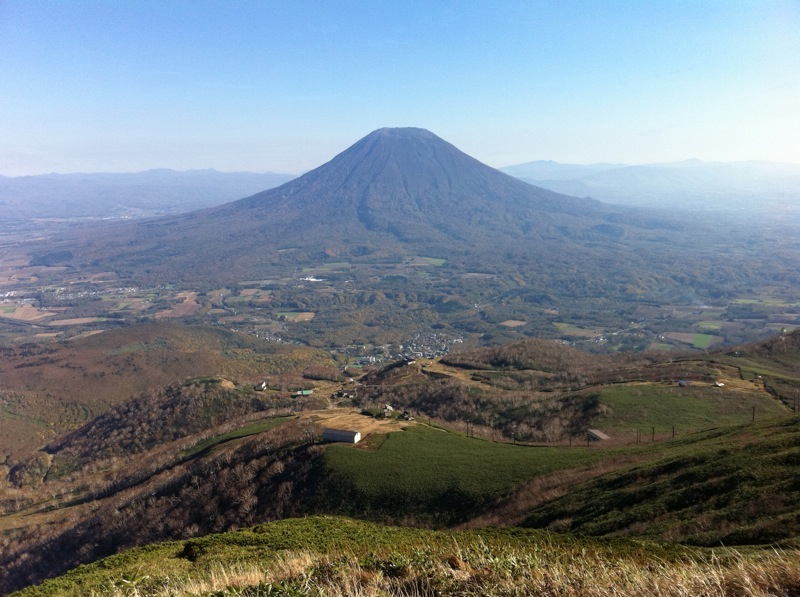
Yotei Volcano on Hokkaido in Japan

=== Japan ===
See list of volcanoes in Japan for more information

==== Hokkaido ====
- Daisetsuzan Volcanic Group
- Mount Eniwa, a stratovolcano
- Mount E, stratovolcano
- Mount Iō, volcanic complex
- Mount Meakan, stratovolcano
- Mount Oakan, stratovolcano/lava dome
- Mount Iō, stratovolcano
- Kuttara Caldera, caldera
- Mashū Caldera, caldera
- Nipesotsu-Maruyama Volcanic Group, composed of stratovolcanoes and lava domes
- Niseko Volcanic Group, composed of stratovolcanoes and lava domes
- Oshima-Ōshima
- Mount Rausu, stratovolcano
- Mount Rishiri, stratovolcano
- Mount Hokkaidō-Komagatake, stratovolcano
- Mount Tarumae, stratovolcano
- Mount Tenchō [ja]
- Mount Usu, stratovolcano
- Mount Yōtei, stratovolcano

==== Honshū ====
- Abu Volcano Group, shield volcanoes
- Mount Adatara, stratovolcano
- Mount Akagi, stratovolcano
- Mount Akandana
- Mount Akita-Komagatake, stratovolcano
- Mount Akita-Yakeyama, stratovolcano
- Mount Asama, volcanic complex
- Mount Azuma, stratovolcano
- Mount Bandai, stratovolcano
- Mount Chōkai, stratovolcano
- Mount Fuji, stratovolcano
- Mount Hachimantai, stratovolcano
- Mount Hakkōda, volcanic complex
- Mount Hakone, volcanic complex
- Mount Haku, stratovolcano
- Mount Haruna, stratovolcano
- Hijiori Caldera
- Mount Hiuchigatake, stratovolcano
- Mount Iwaki, stratovolcano
- Izu-Tōbu volcano Group
- Mount Iwate, stratovolcano complex
- Mount Kurikoma
- Mount Kusatsu-Shirane, stratovolcano
- Mount Myōkō, stratovolcano
- Mount Nantai, stratovolcano
- Narugo, stratovolcano
- Mount Nasu, complex volcano
- Mount Niigata-Yakeyama, stratovolcano
- Mount Nikkō-Shirane, stratovolcano
- Mount Norikura, stratovolcano
- Numazawa [ja]
- Mount Ontake, stratovolcano
- Mount Osore
- Mount Sanbe [ja]
- Mount Takahara [ja]
- Midagahara, lava plateau
- Tokachidake Volcano Group, stratovolcano
- Towada Caldera, caldera
- Mount Yake, stratovolcano
- Kita-Yatsugatake (Northern Yatsugatake Volcanic Group)
- Mount Zaō, complex volcano

==== Izu Islands ====
- Aogashima, volcanic island
- Bayonnaise Rocks, volcanic rocks
- Hachijōjima, volcanic island
- Izu-Ōshima, volcanic island
- Kōzushima, volcanic island
- Mikurajima, volcanic island
- Miyakejima, volcanic island
- Niijima, volcanic island
- Sofugan (A.K.A. Lot's Wife), volcanic island, basalt pillar
- Sumisujima (A.K.A. Smith Rocks), volcanic island
- Toshima, volcanic island
- Torishima (A.K.A. Izu-Torishima), volcanic island
- Ogasawara Archipelago:
- Nishinoshima, volcanic island
- Fukutoku-Okanoba, submarine volcano
- Funka Asane
- Iōjima (Iwo Jima), volcanic island
- Kaitoku Seamount, submarine volcano
- Kaikata Seamount
- Kita-Fukutokutai
- Minami-Hiyoshi Seamount, submarine volcano
- Nikkō Seamount, submarine volcano

==== Kyūshū ====
- Wakamiko Caldera [ja]
- Mount Aso (A.K.A. Aso Caldera), caldera
- Fukue Volcano Group
- Ikeda (Part of Ibusuki Volcanic Field), caldera
- Mount Kaimon, stratovolcano
- Mount Kirishima
- Mount Kujū, stratovolcano
- Sakurajima, Somma-stratovolcano
- Lake Sumiyoshi [ja]
- Yonemaru [ja]
- Mount Tsurumi and Mount Garan, lava dome
- Mount Unzen, complex stratovolcano
- Mount Yufu, stratovolcano

==== Ryūkyū Islands ====
- Submarine Volcano NNE of Iriomotejima, submarine volcano
- Iōtorishima, volcanic island
- Kikai Caldera, caldera
- Kuchinoshima
- Kuchinoerabujima
- Nakanoshima, volcanic island
- Suwanosejima
- Yokoatejima, volcanic island

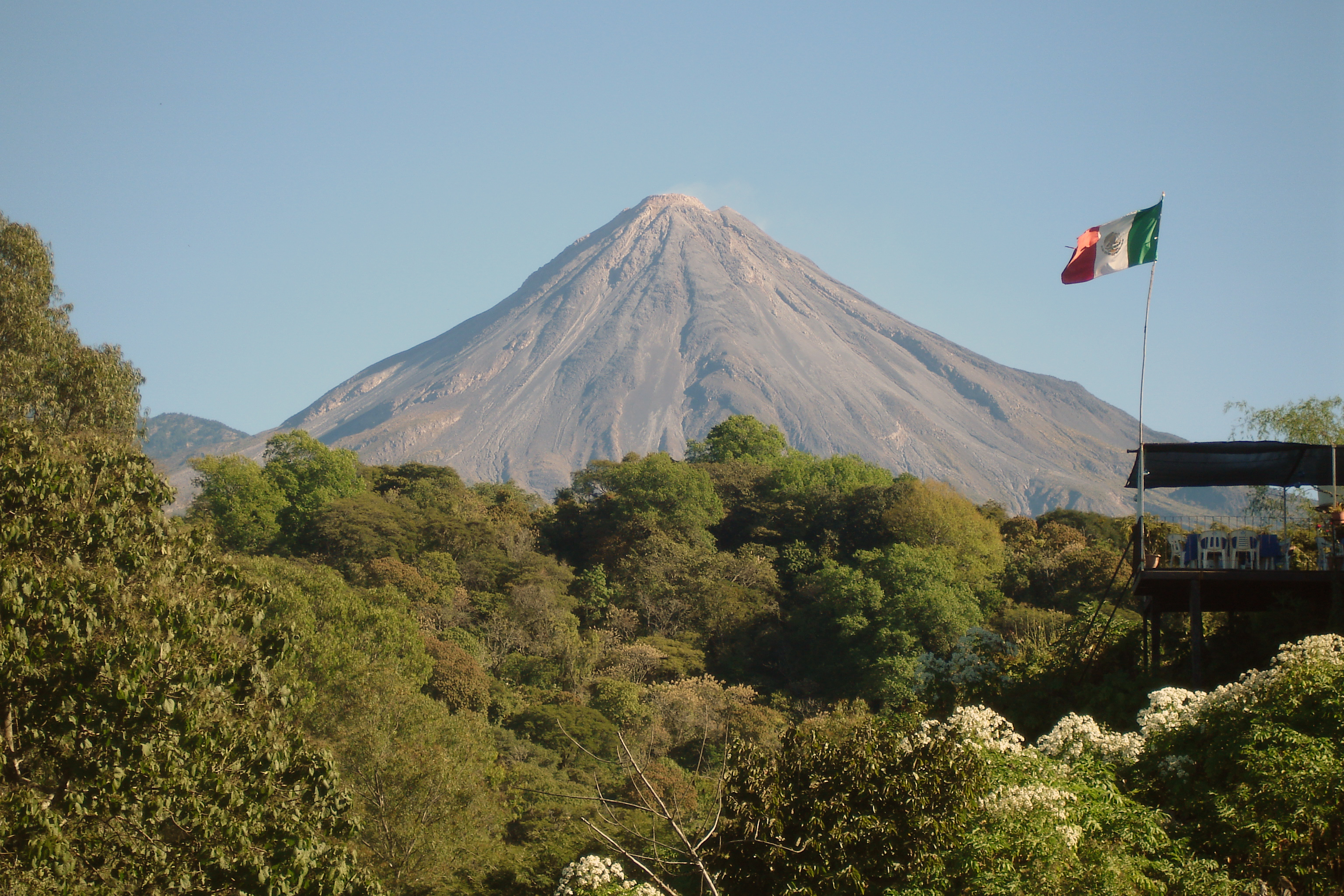
Colima volcano in Mexico

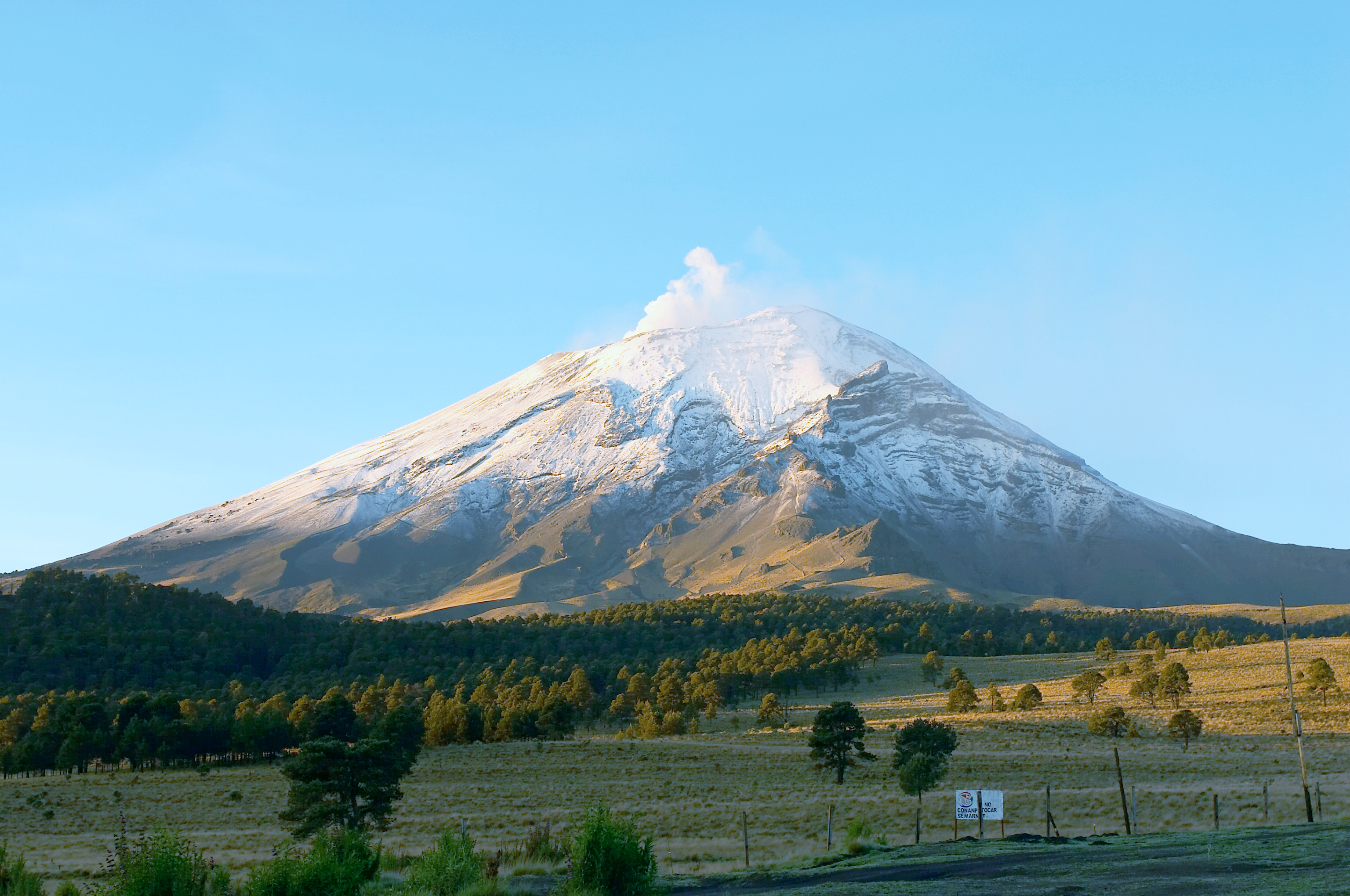
Popocatepetl volcano in Mexico

=== Mexico ===
- Los Atlixcos, shield volcano
- Barcena, pyroclastic cone
- Ceboruco, stratovolcano
- Chichinautzin, volcanic field
- El Chichon, lava dome
- Cofre de Perote, compound
- Colima, stratovolcano
- Comondu-La Purisima, volcanic field
- Coronado, stratovolcano
- Las Cumbres, stratovolcano
- Durango Volcanic Field, volcanic field
- La Gloria, volcanic field
- Guadalupe, shield volcano
- Los Humeros, caldera
- Isla Isabel, tuff cone
- Iztaccihuatl, stratovolcano
- Jaraguay Volcanic Field, volcanic field
- Jocotitlan, stratovolcano
- La Malinche, stratovolcano
- Mascota Volcanic Field, volcanic field
- Michoacan-Guanajuato, a volcanic field that includes the famous 1943 to 1952 Paricutin volcano.
- Naolinco Volcanic Field, volcanic field
- Northern East Pacific Rise at 16°N, fissure vent
- Northern East Pacific Rise at 17°N, fissure vent
- Pico de Orizaba, stratovolcano
- Pinacate, volcanic field
- Popocatepetl, stratovolcano
- Cerro Prieto, lava dome
- San Borja Volcanic Field
- Isla San Luis, tuff cone
- San Martin, volcanic field
- Sanganguey, stratovolcano
- Serdan-Oriental, volcanic field
- Socorro, shield volcano
- Tacana, stratovolcano
- Nevado de Toluca, stratovolcano
- Isla Tortuga, shield volcano
- Zitacuaro-Valle de Bravo, volcanic field

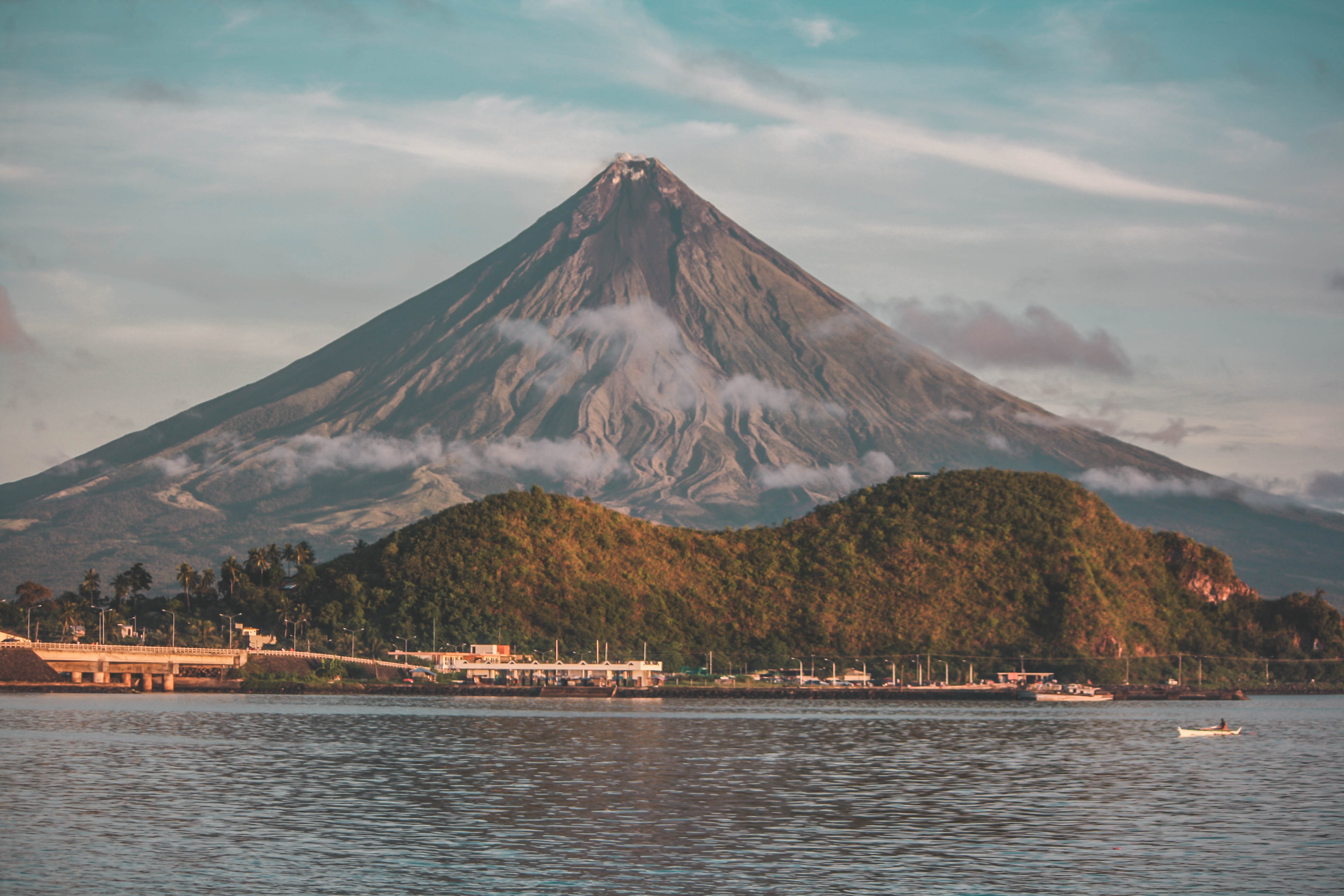
Mayon volcano in the Philippines

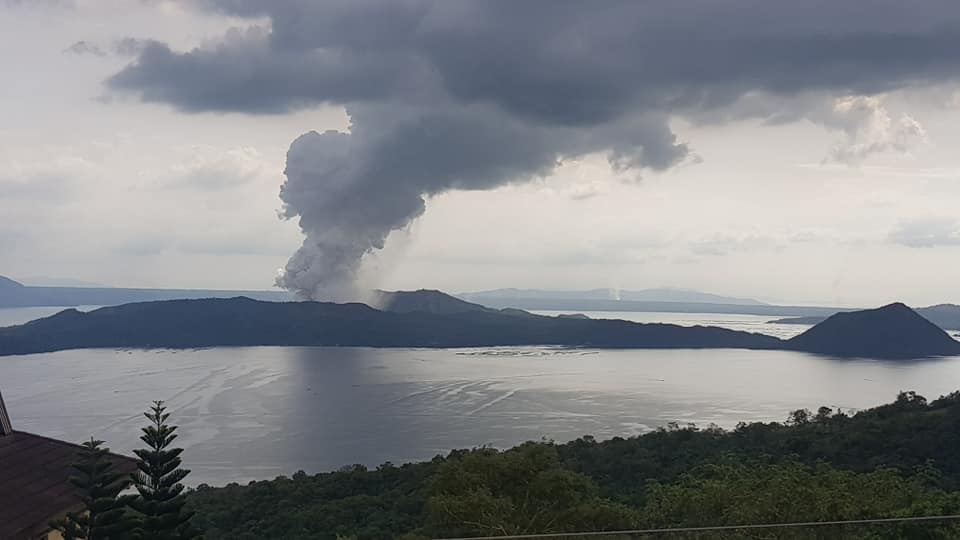
Taal volcano, Philippines

=== Nicaragua ===
- Apoyeque, a shield volcano
- Cerro Negro, a cinder cone
- Concepción (volcano), a stratovolcano
- Cosigüina, a stratovolcano
- Las Lajas (volcano), a shield volcano
- Las Pilas, a complex volcano
- Maderas, a stratovolcano
- Masaya Volcano, a caldera
- Mombacho, a stratovolcano
- Momotombo, a stratovolcano
- Rota (volcano), a stratovolcano
- San Cristóbal Volcano, a stratovolcano
- Zapatera, a shield volcano

=== New Zealand ===
- Auckland volcanic field, a volcano field
- Havre Seamount, a submarine volcano
- James Healy Seamount, a submarine volcano/caldera
- Kakaramea-Tihia Massif, a stratovolcano
- Macauley Island, a submarine volcano/caldera
- Maroa Caldera, a caldera
- Mayor Island / Tūhua, a shield volcano
- Monowai, a submarine volcano
- Mount Ngauruhoe, a stratovolcano
- Mount Ruapehu, a stratovolcano
- Mount Taranaki, a stratovolcano
- Mount Tarawera, a stratovolcano
- Mount Tongariro, a stratovolcano
- Ōkataina Caldera, a caldera
- Mount Edgecumbe, a stratovolcano
- Raoul Island, a stratovolcano
- Reporoa Caldera, a caldera
- South Kermadec Ridge Seamounts, submarine volcanic seamounts
- Taupō Volcano, a large caldera
- Waiotapu, a caldera
- Whakaari / White Island, a stratovolcano

=== Peru ===
- Chachani, a stratovolcano
- Coropuna, a stratovolcano
- Huambo volcanic field, a volcano field
- Misti, a stratovolcano
- Casiri (Tacna), a complex volcano
- Sabancaya, a stratovolcano
- Ubinas, a stratovolcano
- Huaynaputina, a stratovolcano
- Yucamane, a stratovolcano

=== Philippines ===
- Ambalatungan Group, a volcanic compound
- Apo, a stratovolcano
- Babuyan Claro, a stratovolcano
- Balut, a stratovolcano
- Mount Banahaw, volcanic complex
- Biliran, volcanic compound
- Mount Bulusan, stratovolcano
- Cabalían, stratovolcano
- Cagua, stratovolcano
- Camiguin, stratovolcano
- Camiguin de Babuyanes, stratovolcano
- Cuernos de Negros, volcanic complex
- Didicas, volcanic compound
- Iraya, stratovolcano
- Iriga, stratovolcano
- Isarog, stratovolcano
- Kalatungan, stratovolcano
- Kanlaon, stratovolcano
- Laguna Caldera, a caldera
- Leonard Range, stratovolcano
- Mahagnao, stratovolcano
- Makaturing, stratovolcano
- Malindang, stratovolcano
- Malindig, stratovolcano
- Mandalagan, volcanic complex
- Masaraga, stratovolcano
- Matutum, stratovolcano
- Mayon, stratovolcano
- Musuan, a lava dome
- Parker, stratovolcano
- Patoc, stratovolcano
- Pinatubo, stratovolcano
- Pocdol Mountains, a volcanic compound
- Ragang, stratovolcano
- San Pablo Volcanic Field, a volcanic field
- Silay, stratovolcano
- Taal, a caldera

=== Turkey ===
- Mount Ararat, a compound volcano

=== United States ===
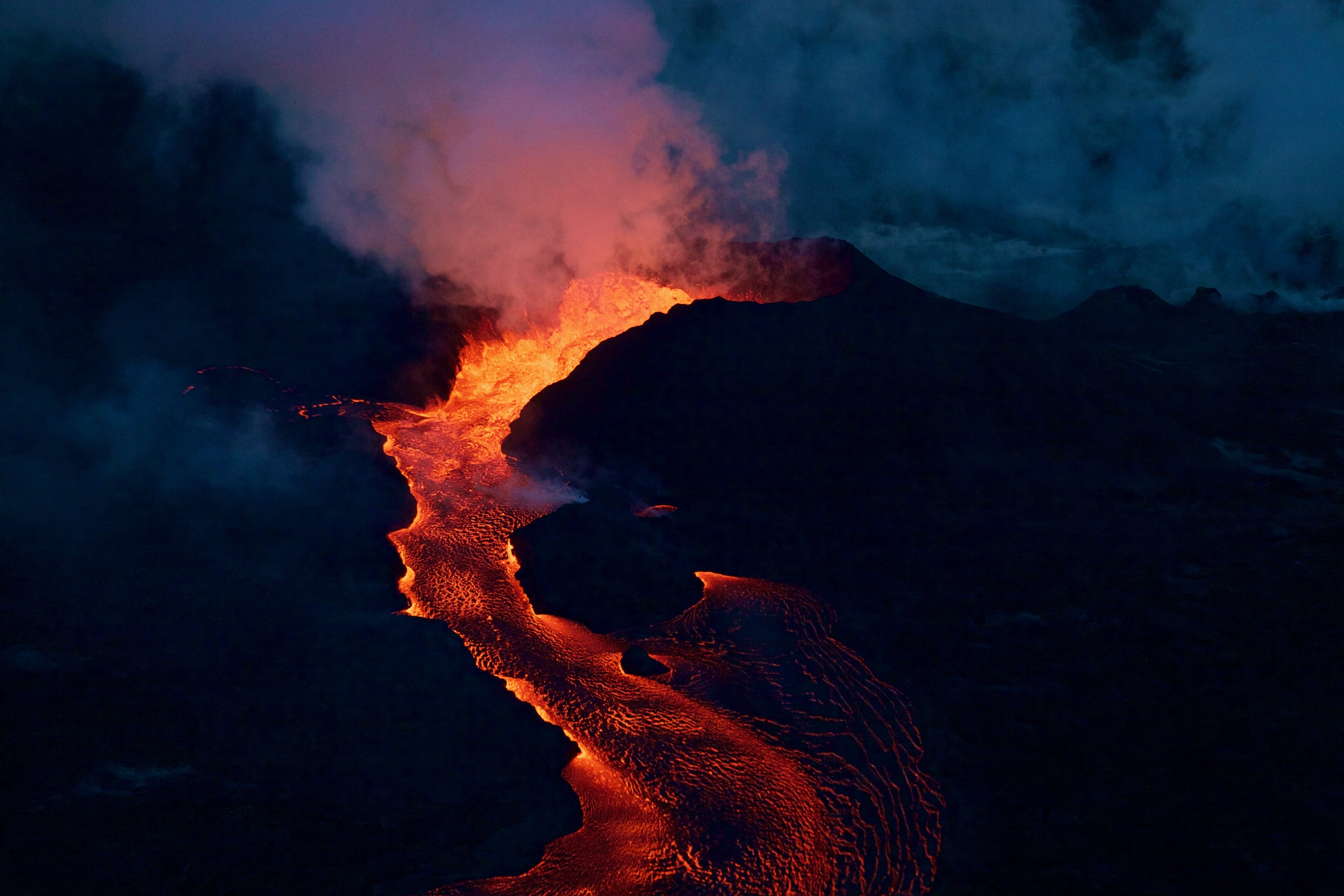
Kilauea Fissure 8 cone

- Pinacate Peaks, a volcano field
- San Francisco volcanic field, a volcanic field
- Uinkaret volcanic field, a volcano field

==== Colorado ====
- Dotsero, a maar volcano

==== Hawaii ====
- Kīlauea, a shield volcano
- Mauna Loa, a shield volcano
- Hualālai a shield volcano
- Mauna Kea, a shield volcano
- Kama'ehuakanaloa, a submarine volcano off the coast of Hawaii
- Haleakalā, a shield volcano

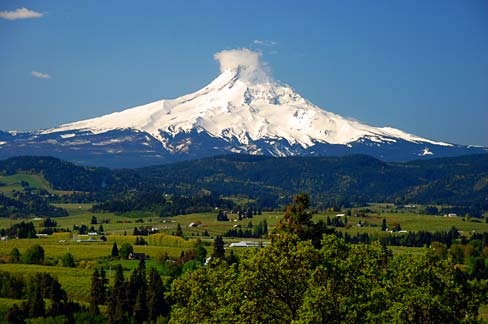
Mount Hood in Oregon

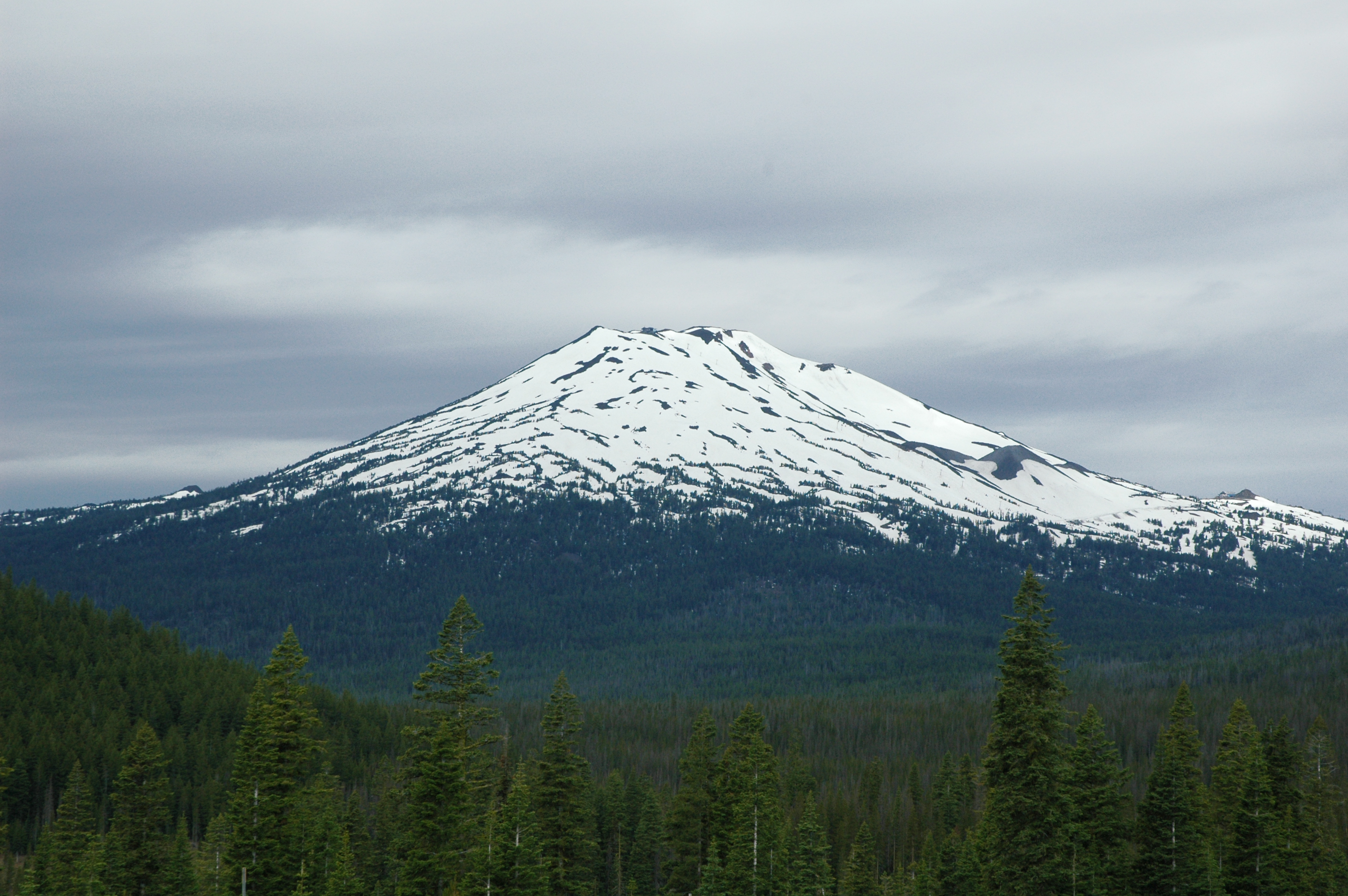
Mount Bachelor, Oregon

==== Idaho ====
- Black Butte Crater Lava Field, a volcano field
- Craters of the Moon, a volcanic field
- Hell's Half Acre Lava Field, a volcano field

==== Oregon ====
- Boring Lava Field, a volcanic field that intersects with Washington
- Mount Hood, a stratovolcano
- Mount Jefferson (Oregon), a stratovolcano
- Olallie Butte, a shield volcano
- Blue Lake Crater, a maar
- Sand Mountain Volcanic Field, a volcanic field
- Mount Washington (Oregon), a shield volcano or stratovolcano
- Belknap Crater, a shield volcano
- Three Sisters, a shield volcano, stratovolcano(es), and complex volcano
- Mount Bachelor, a stratovolcano and shield volcano
- Newberry Volcano, a shield volcano, stratovolcano, and caldera
- Devils Garden volcanic field, a volcanic field
- East Lava Field, a volcanic field
- Four Craters Lava Field, a volcanic field
- Fort Rock–Christmas Lake Valley basin, a volcanic field
- Davis Lake volcanic field, a volcanic field
- Cinnamon Butte, a volcanic field, lava domes, and cinder cones
- Mount Bailey (Oregon), a shield volcano and tephra cone
- Mount Mazama, a stratovolcano, caldera
- Mount McLoughlin, a stratovolcano, shield volcano, and cinder cone
- Brown Mountain (Oregon), a shield volcano and cinder cone
- Pelican Butte, a shield volcano
- Modoc Plateau, a volcanic field and volcanic plateau
- Diamond Craters, a volcanic field and shield volcano
- Jordan Craters, a volcanic field
- Jackies Butte, a volcanic field, shield volcanoes, and cinder cones

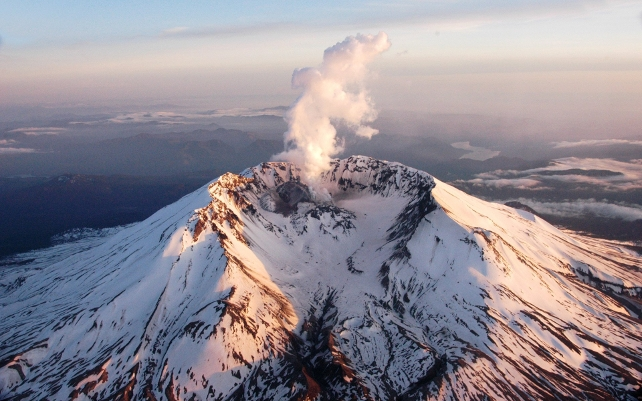
Mount St. Helens, Washington

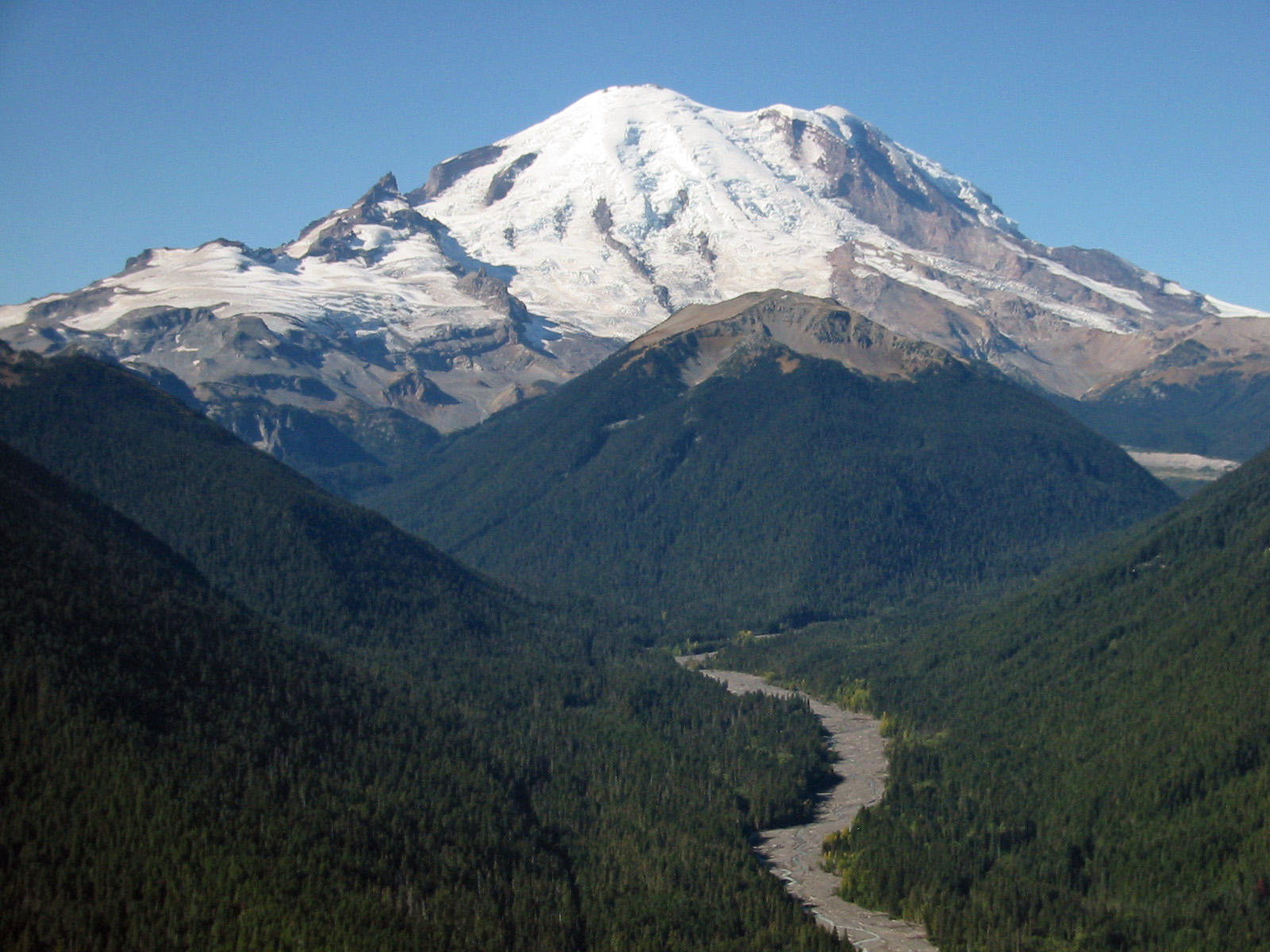
Mount Rainier, Washington

==== New Mexico ====
- Valles Caldera, a caldera

==== Washington ====
- Mount Saint Helens, a stratovolcano with lava domes
- Mount Adams (Washington), a stratovolcano
- Mount Rainier, a stratovolcano
- Glacier Peak, a stratovolcano
- Mount Baker, a stratovolcano
- Spiral Butte, a cinder cone and lava dome with a preserved lava flow
- King Mountain (Washington), a shield volcano with a series of spatter cones
- Indian Heaven, a volcanic field and group of shield volcanoes
- Marble Mountain-Trout Creek Hill, a volcanic field
- Boring Lava Field, a volcanic field that intersects with Oregon

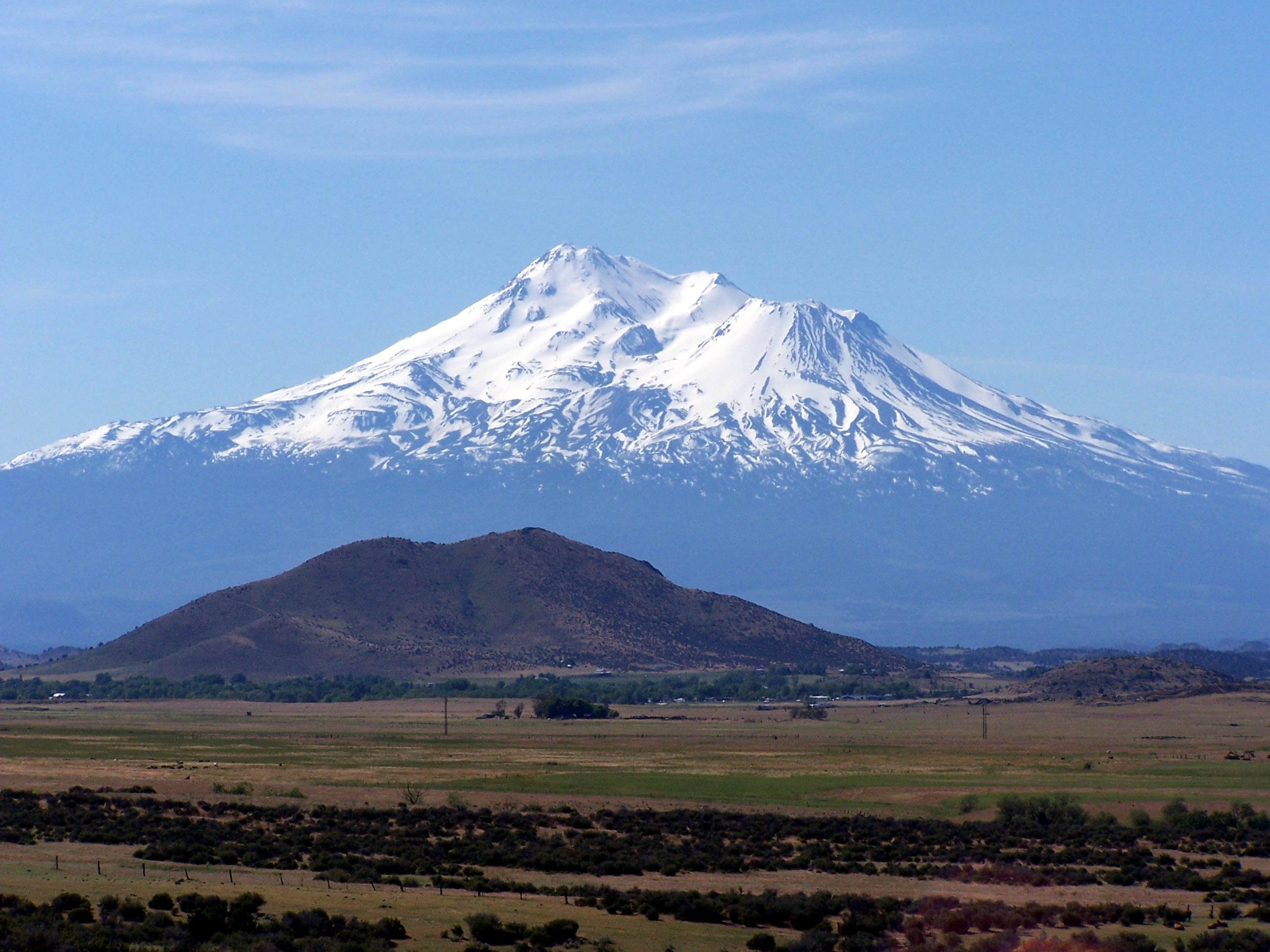
Mount Shasta, California

==== California ====
- Mount Shasta, a stratovolcano
- Lassen Peak, a stratovolcano
- Clear Lake Volcanic Field, a volcanic field full of lava domes and cinder cones
- Mount Konocti, a lava dome
- Mono-Inyo Craters, a volcanic field and volcanic arc within the Sierra Nevada
- Negit Island, an island with a volcanic cone on it
- Paoha Island, an island with a volcanic cone on it
- Panum Crater, a cinder cone with a lava dome
- Mammoth Mountain, a large lava dome
- Long Valley Caldera, a large caldera
- Big Pine volcanic field, a volcanic field
- Coso Volcanic Field, a volcanic field
- Cima volcanic field, a volcanic field
- Lavic Lake volcanic field, a volcanic field
- Amboy Crater, a cinder cone
- Pisgah Crater, a cinder cone
- Aiken's Wash, a cinder cone
- Salton Buttes, a group of short and small lava domes southeast of the Salton Sea
- Red Island Volcano, a short lava dome

==== Wyoming ====
- Yellowstone Caldera, a supervolcano caldera within the United States
