= Yanaurcu (Ecuador) =

Ecuadorian volcano

Coordinates: 0.49849°N 78.33389°W

Yanaurcu is a volcano in Ecuador. It consists of two Pleistocene lava domes reaching a maximum elevation of 4,535 metres (14,879 ft) and are of andesitic composition and older Pliocene volcanics.

In local folklore, Yanaurcu is said to be the offspring of nearby mountain deities Imbabura and Cotacachi.

== Geography and geomorphology ==
Yanaurcu lies in the Imbabura Province of Ecuador and means black mountain in Quechua. The volcano is located in the Cotacachi Cayapas Ecological Reserve.

Yanaurcu is part of the Northern Volcanic Zone of the Andes which contains the arc volcanoes of Ecuador, which include Cayambe, Chachana, Cotopaxi, Illiniza, Pichincha, Pilavo, Pululagua, Reventador, Sangay, Sumaco and Tungurahua. Some of these volcanoes were active in historical times, while many more are extinct. Some large eruptions took place during the Holocene at Cuicocha, Pululagua and Quilotoa.

The volcano consists of two lava domes, the larger southern Cerro Negro group and smaller northern Ñagñaro and in between Pliocene volcanics. The northern dome reaches a height of 4,214 metres (13,825 ft) and the southern one of 4,535 metres (14,879 ft). Both domes are surrounded by moraines and Cerro Negro has been affected by glacial erosion. These three units are constructed on top of even older volcanics of andesitic-dacitic composition, which crop out north and south/east of the northerly and southerly lava dome, respectively.

== Geology ==
Off the western coast of South America, the Nazca Plate subducts beneath the South America Plate at a rate of 8–9 centimetres per year (3.1–3.5 in/year); this process is responsible for the volcanism in the Ecuadorian Andes as well as mountain formation and earthquakes. The subduction process is further impacted by the entrainment of the Carnegie Ridge into the trench, which is suspected to have influenced volcanism in Ecuador by leading to the formation of adakitic melts, a notion that is however controversial.

The Ecuadorian Andes consist of the Western Cordillera and the Eastern Cordillera with the Inter-Andean Valley between the two. The crust in the Ecuadorian Andes has been influenced both by changes in the tectonic stress regime and the integration of basaltic crustal fragments.

Volcanic rocks at Yanaurcu are andesitic and define a calc-alkaline suite. Phenocrysts include amphibole, biotite, orthopyroxene, plagioclase and quartz. Differences in composition between the Pliocene units and the Pleistocene domes have been used to define the Pliocene volcano as a separate volcanic system from the Pleistocene one, and otherwise may reflect primarily crustal processes.

== Eruption history ==
Dates obtained from the volcano include 3.58 ± 0.03 million years ago for the Pliocene volcanics, 171.6 ± 20.5 thousand years ago for the northern dome and 60,600 ± 20,000 years ago for the southern dome.
