= Jorcada =

Volcano in Andes, Bolivia

Coordinates: 22.08°S 67.77°W

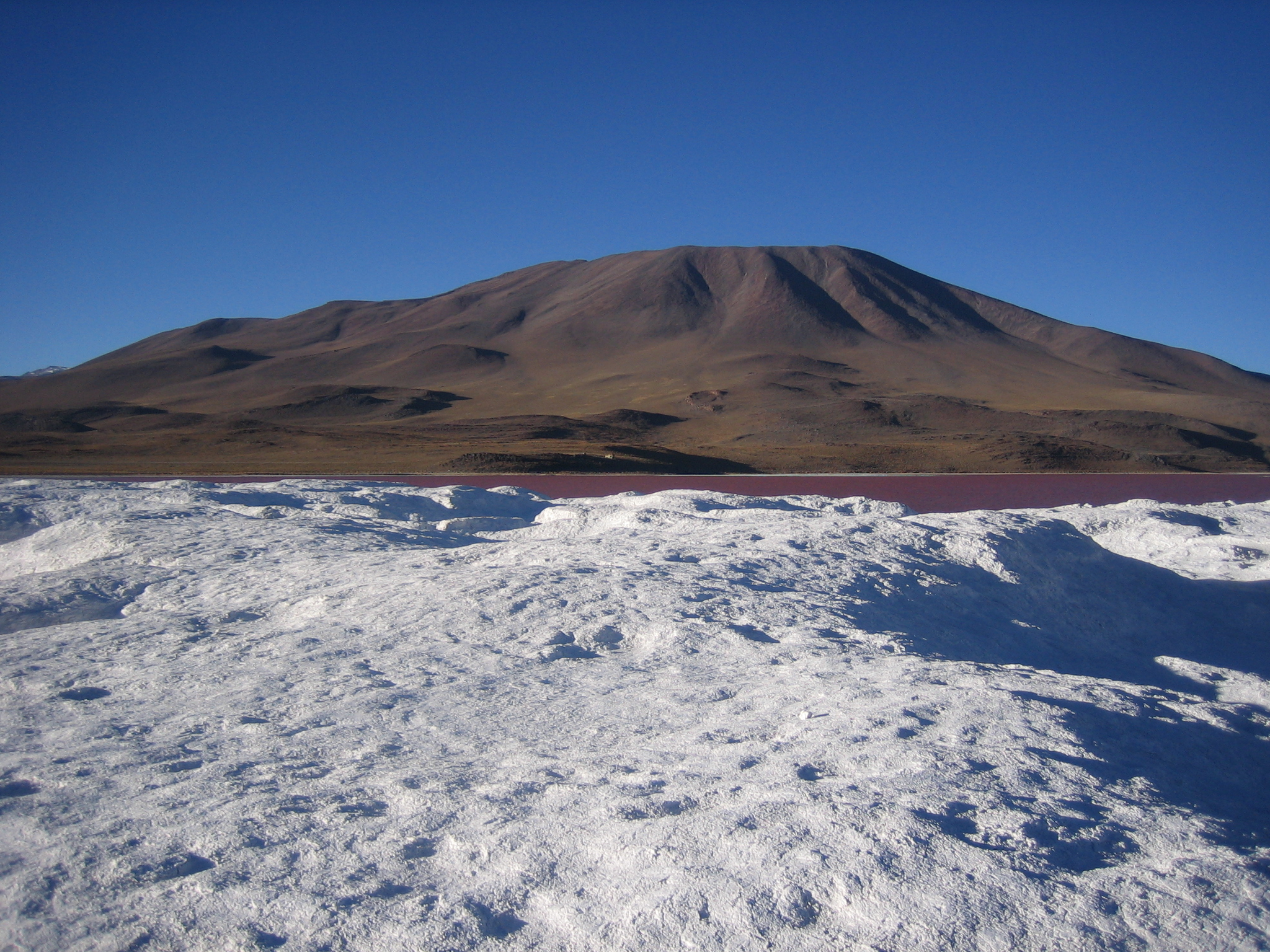
- View on Jorcada

Highest point
- Elevation: 5,750 m (18,860 ft)

Geography

Jorcada is a volcano in the Andes, Bolivia. It is constructed by four fissures between Pastos Grandes and Laguna Colorada. Several stratovolcanoes, seven lava domes are constructed along the fissures, with craters ranging 0.2–1.5 kilometres (0.12–0.93 mi) in diameter.

The stratovolcanoes are of andesitic-dacitic composition and the lava domes have erupted rhyolite, and the last eruption occurred on the northwestern fissure 95,000 BP. On that fissure basaltic-andesitic centres were formed.

== Sources ==
"Jorcada". Global Volcanism Program. Smithsonian Institution.
