= Red Island Volcano =

Lava dome volcano in Imperial County, California

Red Island
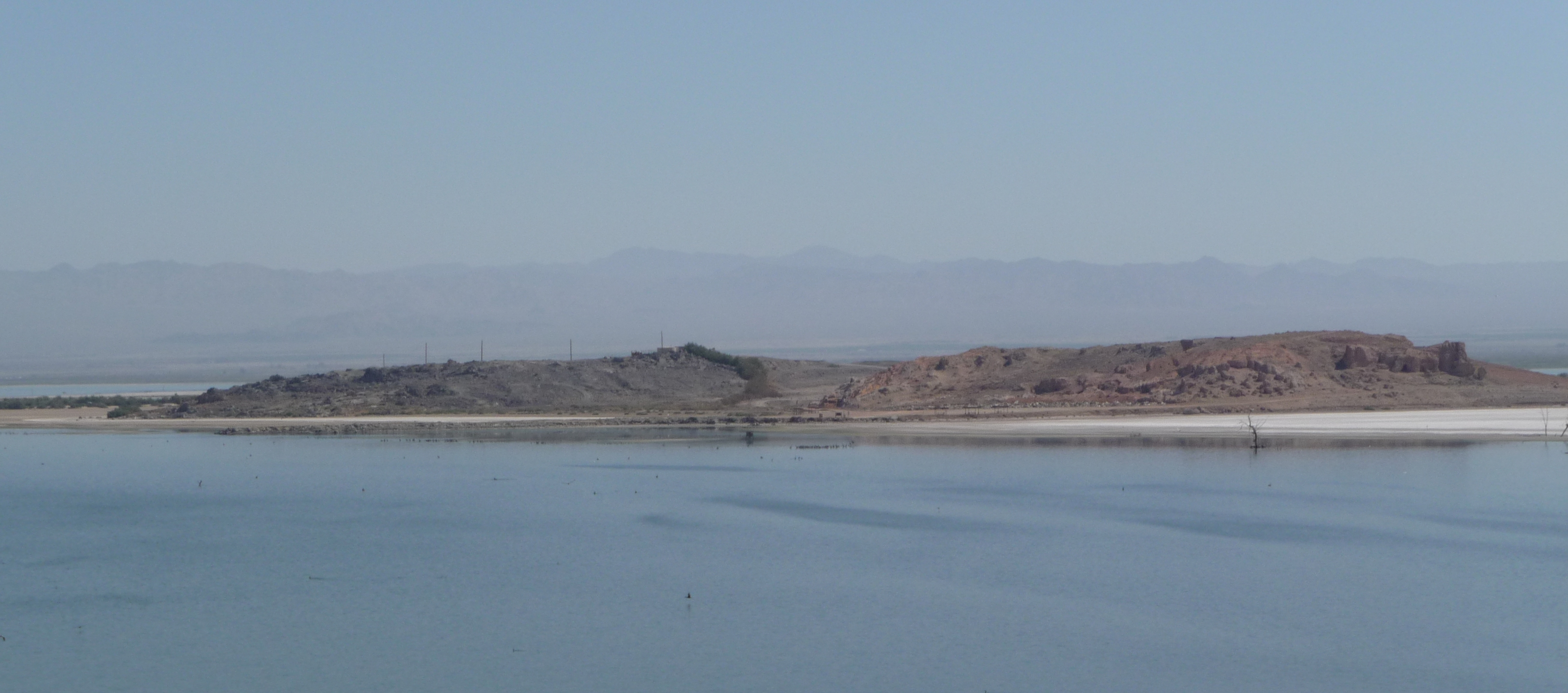
- The two domes of Red Hill

Highest point
- Elevation: −137 ft (−42 m)
- Prominence: 88 ft (27 m)
- Coordinates: 33°12′01″N 115°36′42″W

Geography
- Location within California
- Location: Imperial County, California, U.S.
- Parent range: Salton Buttes
- Topo map: USGS Niland

Climbing
- Easiest route: Walk

Red Island (or Red Hill) is a lava dome volcano in the Salton Trough, and part of the Salton Buttes, the only active volcanoes in Southern California. It is located in Imperial County, California. It contains two lava domes, Prospect Dome and Alamo Dome. The domes have been dormant for 2,000 to 8,000 years. The saddle between the domes, about 50 feet (15 m) below the summit of each dome, is a parking lot for county park visitors.

In around 2006-2007 the island became connected to the mainland due to the drying up of the salton sea and being close to the Alamo River only served to accelerate this process and by 2022 the island was surrounded on three sides by land.
