= Aliso (volcano) =

Volcano in Ecuador

Coordinates: 0.53°S 78°W

Aerial view of Aliso

Aliso, also known as Pan de Azúcar, is a 3,482-metre-high (11,424 ft) volcano in the Ecuadorian Andes to the east of Antisana volcano. The complex contains a semicircular western ridge and lava domes. The volcano has erupted rhyolites and dacites and some andesitic lava flows on a ridge above Baeza. It is covered with tundra and cloud forests. At least two eruptions of Pumayacu occurred during the Holocene; one dated 4400 years ago and another's lapilli deposits overlie a cultural horizon 2000 years old. Older eruptions have been dated at 1.15 ± 0.07 Ma and are of high-potassium types. They compromise typical arc-derived lavas with fractional crystallization and other differentiation processes.
