= Sangangüey =

Eroded Stratovolcano in Mexico

Volcán Sangangüey
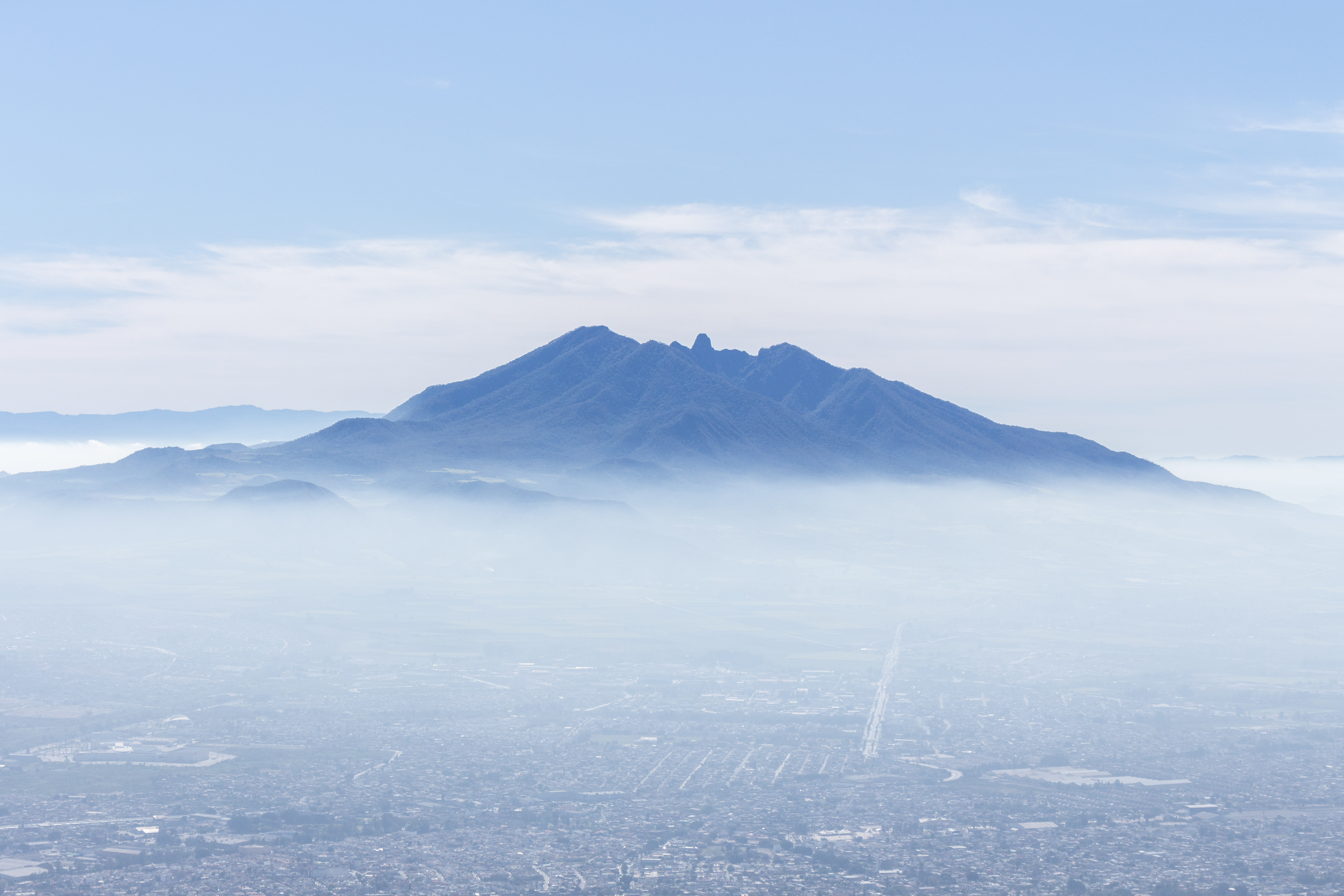

Highest point
- Elevation: 2,340 m (7,680 ft)
- Coordinates: 21.45°N 104.73°W

Geography
- Location within Mexico
- Location: Nayarit, Mexico
- Parent range: Trans-Mexican Volcanic Belt

Geology
- Mountain type: Stratovolcano
- Last eruption: Unknown (possibly 1742)

Sangangüey is an eroded stratovolcano standing 2340 meters tall in the Trans-Mexican Volcanic Belt of Mexico. The volcano is located immediately southeast of Tepic in the state of Nayarit in Mexico. There has been no confirmed historical eruptions, and the volcano is believed to be dormant; although an indigenous legend recorded the volcano erupting in 1742. The eruption is believed to be one occurring on a flank cinder cone on the volcano. Within the last 300,000 years however, the volcano has produced 45 cinder cones and lava flows.
