= Jackies Butte =

Volcanic field in Oregon, United States

- Location within Oregon

Highest point
- Elevation: 4,652 ft (1,418 m)
- Prominence: 397 ft (121 m)
- Coordinates: 42°36′21″N 117°35′20″W

Geography
- Location: Oregon, United States

Geology
- Rock age: Less than 10,000 years ago?
- Mountain type: Volcanic field
- Last eruption: Less than 10,000 years ago, Holocene

Jackies Butte (also known as Bowden Crater) is a basaltic volcanic field located in southeastern Oregon.

== Geology ==
The volcanic field consists of two small shield volcanoes and two cinder cones. The lava flows of Jackies Butte extend 325 km^{2} east of the Bowden Hills.

According to Smith (1978), the volcanic field's probable age is less than 10,000 years old, making it a Holocene volcano. Despite this, Sarna-Wojciki (1983) did not include Jackies Butte in their list of Holocene volcanic fields.

The volcano's highest elevation is 4,652 ft (1,418 m). Its prominence is 397 ft (121 m).

== Location ==
Jackies Butte is situated north of McDermitt and south of Rome. The closest major river is the Owyhee River, which passes along the region.

The area of Jackies Butte is also a herd management area (HMA) for horses.
