= Cerro de los Chenques =

Coordinates: 44°52′25″S 70°03′49″W

- Location within Argentina

Highest point

Cerro de los Chenques is a monogenetic volcano in the Chubut Province, Argentina, which was considered to be of Holocene age but was later re-dated to be of lower Pleistocene age. The volcano developed on a basement formed by Mesoproterozoic and Neoproterozoic rocks and more recent volcanic and granitic formations.

The volcano is source of lava flows and pyroclastics; the former covered an area of about 28 square kilometres (11 sq mi). The cone is accompanied by hills that may be additional cones and consists of layers of lava and pyroclastic material. The cone has a breach on its northeastern side. Cerro de los Chenques has erupted rocks ranging from alkali basalt to basanite, which contain phenocrysts ranging from clinopyroxene, olivine and plagioclase.

It is considered part of the Patagonian basaltic volcanics, which take place behind the main volcanic arc and are considered to be backarc volcanism. Such volcanics take the form of large volcanic plateaus. These volcanic are noted for their xenoliths which have been used to infer the composition of the mantle.
