= East Lava Field =

Volcanic field in Lake County, Oregon, United States

Squaw Ridge Lava Field (East Lava Field)
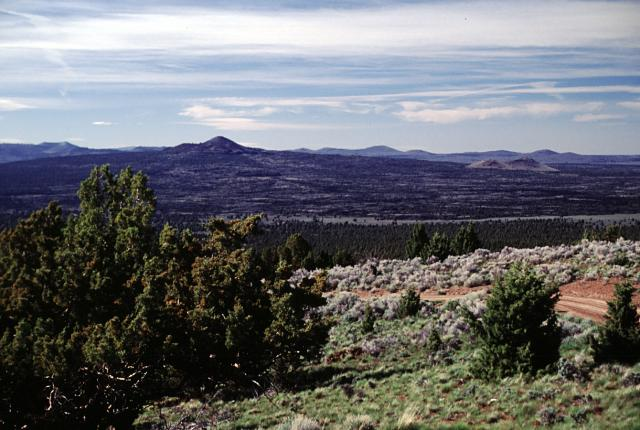
- The Squaw Ridge Lava Field is the middle of a group of three young basaltic fields located in the High Lava Plains SE of Newberry volcano.

Highest point
- Elevation: 1,711 m (5,614 ft)
- Coordinates: 43°28′20″N 120°45′13″W

Geography
- Location: Lake County, Oregon, United States

Geology
- Rock age: Holocene
- Mountain type: Volcanic field
- Last eruption: 50,000 years ago

The Squaw Ridge Lava field, also known as the East Lava Field, is a young basaltic field located in the U.S. state of Oregon southeast of Newberry Volcano. The flow erupted from the Lava Mountain shield and is likely related to the Four Craters Lava Field, both of which were created after Mount Mazama erupted.

== Notable Vents ==
Name	Elevation	Location	Last eruption
Lava Mountain	1,711 metres (5,614 ft)	43.472°N 120.754°W	-
Twin Buttes	1,525 metres (5,003 ft)	43.47°N 120.73°W	-

== See also ==
- Devils Garden volcanic field
- List of volcanoes in the United States
- List of volcanic fields
- Types of volcanic eruptions
