= Devils Garden volcanic field =

Volcanic field in Oregon, United States

Devils Garden Volcanic Field
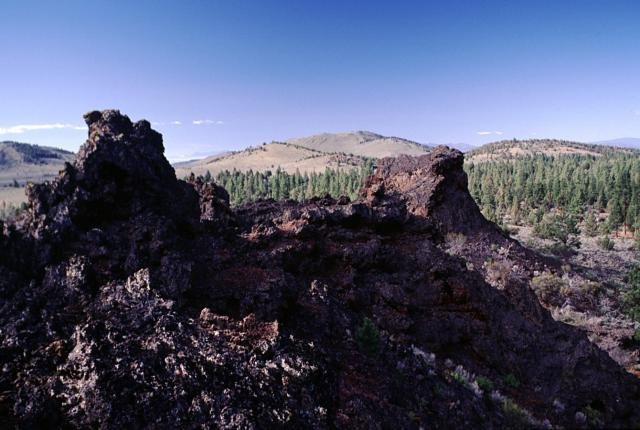
- The Blowouts, the spatter vents in the foreground, are some of the source vents of the voluminous Devils Garden lava field.

Highest point
- Elevation: 5,571 ft (1,698 m)
- Coordinates: 43°30′43″N 120°51′40″W

Geography
- Location: Lake County, Oregon, U.S.

Geology
- Rock age: Holocene?
- Mountain type: volcanic field
- Last eruption: More than 50,000 years ago

Devils Garden Volcanic Field is a volcanic field located south east of Newberry Caldera in Oregon. The lava field consists of several flows of pahoehoe lava that erupted from fissure vents in the northeast part of the Devils Garden. The main vent on the north end of the fissure created a lava tube system. Several small vents to the south produced the Blowouts (two large spatter cones), several small spatter cones, and flows. Several older hills and higher areas were completely surrounded by the flows to form kipukas. The distal ends of the flows show excellent examples of inflated lava.

The flows cover an area of 45 square miles (117 km^{2}).

Devils Garden is most likely between 50,000 and 10,000 years old. It is certainly older than the formation of Crater Lake as ash from the eruption of Mount Mazama overlays the Devils Garden lava flows.

== See also ==
- List of volcanic fields
- Four Craters Lava Field
- East Lava Field
