= Resago =

Cinder cone in the Linares Province of Chile

Coordinates: 36.45°S 70.92°W

Resago is a cinder cone in the Linares Province of Chile.

This cinder cone may have formed during historical times, and created a basaltic andesite lava flow that extended over 3 kilometres (1.9 mi) of length to Laguna del Dial.

== Sources ==
"Resago". Global Volcanism Program. Smithsonian Institution.
