= Black Butte Crater Lava Field =

Lava field in Idaho, USA

Coordinates: 43°11′01″N 114°20′53″W

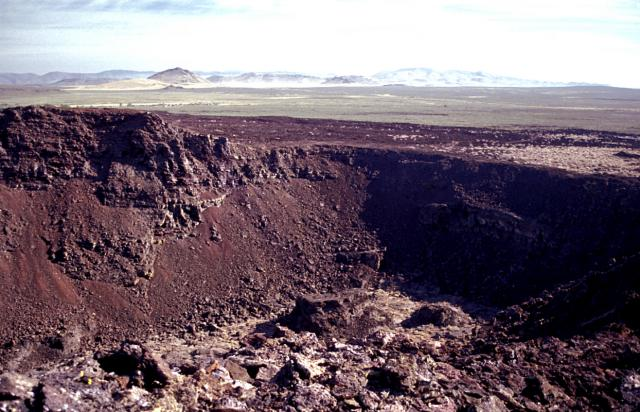
Shoshone Lava Field

The Black Butte Crater Lava Field, formerly known as Shoshone Lava Field is a lava plain in the U.S. state of Idaho, located in Lincoln County north of the city of Shoshone.

It is the westernmost of the young lava fields occupying the Snake River Plain. The latest volcanic activity occurred during the Holocene period.
