= Soche =

Volcano in Ecuador

Coordinates: 0.552°N 77.58°W

Soche is a 3,955-metre-high (12,976 ft) dacitic volcano in Ecuador and is located on the northern end of a secondary volcanic chain. Constructed on a Paleozoic substratum, it contains an eastwards-opening caldera in the summit region. A large eruption in 6650 BCE generated ashfall into Colombia and two lava domes in the caldera. The ash- and lapilli-fall is about a metre thick in the Interandean valley and the neighbouring cordilleras and most likely represented a long-lasting obstacle for human population. Earlier eruptive events involving a lava flow that was subsequently offset by a fault zone named the Cayambe-Chingual fault by 110m occurred 9.67 ka BP, and another involving a pyroclastic flow was dated at 37.22 ± 0.63 ka BP.
