= Niigata-Yakeyama =

Active volcano on the island of Honshu, Japan

Niigata-Yake-Yama
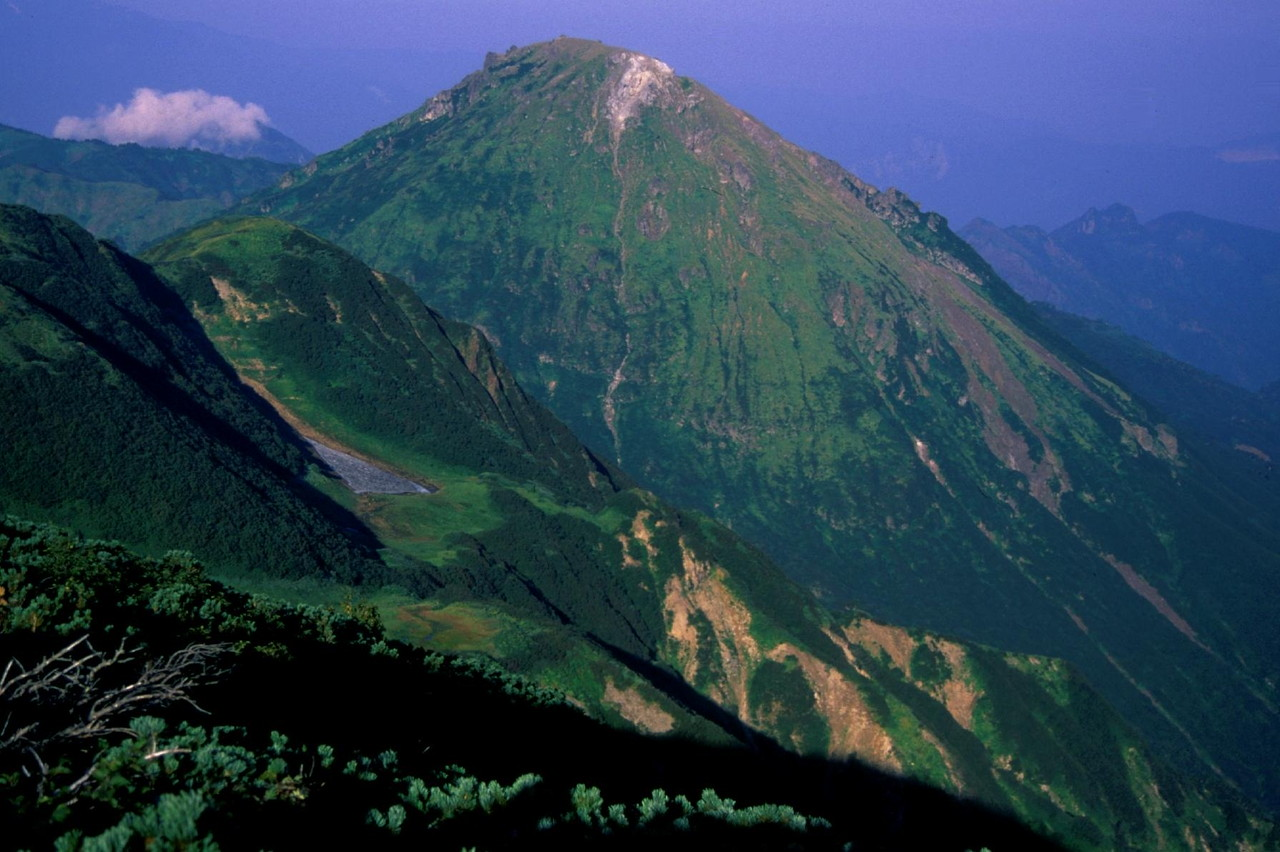
- Niigata-Yake-Yama from Mount Hiuchi

Highest point
- Elevation: 2,400 m (7,900 ft)
- Coordinates: 36°55′15″N 138°02′09″E

Naming
- Native name: 新潟焼山 (Japanese)

Geography
- Location within Niigata Prefecture
- Location: (Japan) Japan; Niigata Prefecture, Itoigawa City and Myōkō City

Geology
- Mountain type: Lava dome
- Volcanic arc: Northeastern Japan Arc
- Last eruption: March 1998

Niigata-Yake-Yama (新潟焼山, Niigata Yakeyama) is an active volcano in Honshu, Japan. A large eruption in 887 AD sent pyroclastic flows to the Japan Sea.

== Morphology ==
The volcano takes the form of a lava dome that was built above a ridge of a Tertiary mountain range near the Japanese coast. The volcano is one of the youngest in Japan, with an estimated age of approximately 3100 years. The top of the lava dome is cut by fissures where mild phreatic eruptions have taken place in recent historical times.

== Historical eruptions ==
Three major magmatic eruptions have taken place in historical time, in 887 AD, 1361 and 1773, these eruptions are VEI 3–4 in range and have produced lava and pyroclastic flows that have reached the coast. The eruption of 1361 is responsible for the current summit lava dome. Since 1773, all eruptions have been phreatic and have come from fissures and craters at the summit and sides of the dome.

=== 1974 eruption ===
The first eruption in 25 years occurred on 28 July 1974. This eruption was phreatic. The eruption came from fissures 200 m on the side of the summit lava dome, producing widespread ashfall. Ash fell on cities around the area. Three students on the volcano were killed by either poisonous gases or ejecta.

=== 1987 eruption ===
A smaller eruption took place in 1987. Two ash plumes were detected rising from the NE flank and the SE flank, later investigation showed steam venting from eight different spots. During the eruption, many residents had to flee the area.

=== 1989 eruption ===
On 30 March 1989, a steam column issued from Niigata-Yake-Yama, four days later, a steam column containing a small amount of ash erupted.

=== 1997 and 1998 eruptions ===
Two other eruptions were recorded from Niigata-Yake-Yama on 26 October 1997 (which continued until 10 December) and 30 March 1998. These were both small eruptions (VEI 1) which originated from the east flank of the summit dome.
