= Four Craters Lava Field =

Volcanic field in Oregon, United States

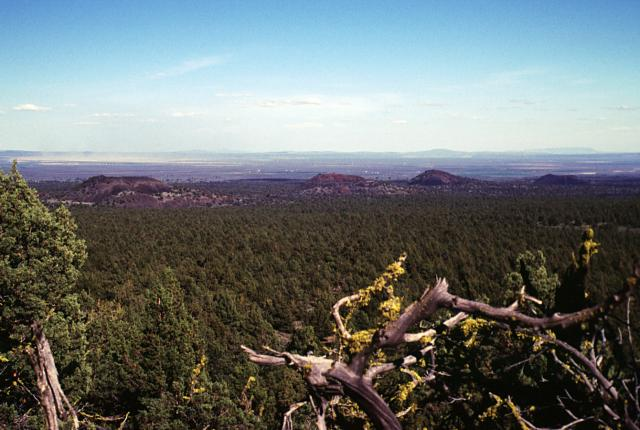
- Craters of the aptly named Four Craters Lava Field are seen here from the NW on Green Mountain.

Highest point
- Elevation: 4,924 ft (1,501 m)
- Coordinates: 43°21′36″N 120°39′46″W

Geography
- Location: Lake County, Oregon, U.S.

Geology
- Rock age: Holocene
- Mountain type: volcanic field
- Last eruption: < 50,000 years ago

Four Craters Lava Field is a basaltic volcanic field located south east of Newberry Caldera in the U.S. state of Oregon. The volcanic field covers about 30 square kilometers and post-dates Mount Mazama's eruption. Four Holocene cinder cones are the source of the flows in the field and are aligned along a fissure trending N 30° W. The cones rise 75 to 120 meters above the flows and the distance between the northernmost and southernmost cones is about 3.5 kilometers.

Closely related to the Four Craters lava field is Crack-in-the-Ground located at the southwest corner of the field. The eruptions from the field were accompanied by a slight sinking of the older rock surface. This shallow, graben-like sink is about 3 kilometers wide and extends to the south into an old lake basin. Crack-in-the-Ground marks the western edge of this small, volcano-tectonic depression and is nearly 9 meters deep and over a meter wide. The crack is the result of a tension fracture along a hingeline produced by the draping of Green Mountain lava flows over the edge of upthrown side of the concealed fault zone.

== See also ==
- East Lava Field
- Devils Garden volcanic field
- List of volcanic fields
