= Los Atlixcos =

Volcano in Veracruz, Mexico

- Location within Mexico

Highest point
- Elevation: 800 m (2,600 ft)
- Coordinates: 19.809°N 96.526°W

Geography
- Location: Veracruz, Mexico

Geology
- Mountain type: Shield volcano

Los Atlixcos is a volcano in the Mexican state of Veracruz.
