= Pilavo =

Volcano in Ecuador

Coordinates: 8°31′N 78°22′W

Pilavo is a volcano in Ecuador. It is more a shield volcano than a stratovolcano and was active about 20,000/40,000 - 8,000 years before present with basaltic andesite-andesite lava flows. It is part of Chachimbiro.

== Geography and geomorphology ==
Pilavo is part of the volcanic arc of Ecuador. Other volcanoes in the arc are Pichincha, Pululagua and Sumaco.

Pilavo resembles more a shield volcano than a stratovolcano as it consists of long, thin lava flows which form a 650 metres (2,130 ft) high but about 8 kilometres (5.0 mi) wide pile. The summit has been weakly glaciated, with a 1 kilometre (0.62 mi) wide central depression. Parulo volcano lies off the western margin of Pilavo; a lava flow of which forms a lava dam at Laguna Donoso. To the east, Pilavo is surrounded by the Chachimbiro volcanic complex, of which it is part of.

== Geology ==
Off the western coast of South America, the Nazca Plate subducts beneath the South America Plate. This subduction is responsible for the volcanism in the volcanic arc, but the presence of the Carnegie Ridge on the subducting plate may modify the extent of volcanism: Whereas the volcanic arc in Colombia is relatively narrow, in Ecuador it is over 100 kilometres (62 mi) wide.

Pilavo lies west of the main volcanic arc and is constructed on a crust that is in part derived from the Caribbean large igneous province, part of which were integrated on the Ecuadorean coast and gave the crust thus a mafic signature. Otherwise, the basement includes Cretaceous marine and volcanic sequences, and is cut by a number of faults which controlled the location of the volcanic vents including these of Pilavo.

Pilavo has erupted andesite and basaltic andesite, which contain hornblende, plagioclase and pyroxene and are covered with soils. Phenocrysts of amphibole, clinopyroxene and plagioclase are found in the lava, which defines a tholeiitic suite with low potassium content.

== Eruption history ==
The weak glacial erosion and the presence of younger tephras in the soils imply that Pilavo erupted between 20,000/40,000-8,000 years before present. The volcanic activity took place in three different stages, including one which formed the Parulo volcano whose temporal relationship to the main Pilavo volcano is however unclear.
