= Cryptocurrencies in Puerto Rico =

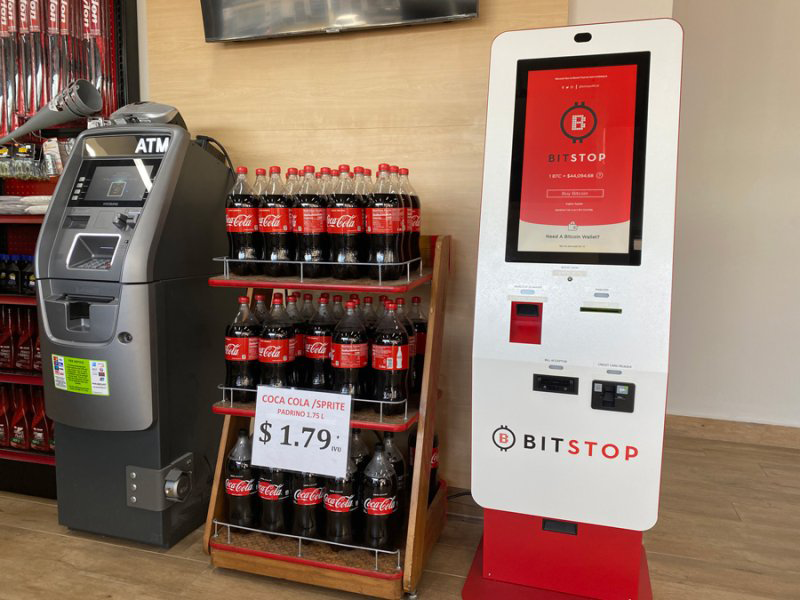
A Bitcoin ATM or Bitcoin Teller Machine (BTM) in Bayamón, Puerto Rico.

With the arrival of several figures led by Brock Pierce following the passing of hurricane Maria in 2017, cryptocurrency became an issue of media and economic interest in the Caribbean archipelago of Puerto Rico. These traders relocated to the island motivated by the tax incentives provided by Act 20-2012 and Act 22-2012 (both now part of as Act 60–2019) and the tropical setting. They claimed that their intention was to create an utopian blockchain "crypto city" or "community", which at various times became known by the names of Puertopia, Crypto Rico, Puerto Crypto or Sol, calling themselves Puertopians. The ideas promoted by this group have prompted a mixed reception, being favored by gubernatorial administrations but also spawning protests from political and grassroots movements that raise concerns about disaster capitalism, gentrification and settler colonialism. Puerto Rico has earned a reputation as a hub for cryptocurrency enthusiasts and, according to Pierce, by 2021 the archipelago had the largest quantity of coins concentrated in a single place in the world.

== History ==
=== Influx of crypto traders, Puertopia ===
A colonial building in Old San Juan that served as one of the first meeting sites of the Puertopians. Seen here in early 2018, still ravaged from the passage of Maria.

An increase in the value of cryptocurrencies has made several traders wealthy, with some oscillating between being millionaires and billionaires.

Michael Terpin, founder of BitAngels, claims to be the first crypto investor to relocate by doing so in 2016 and has been active in promoting the settlement of more foreigners as part of a practice that he does not consider "colonization". On September 20, 2017, hurricane Maria passed over Puerto Rico, creating what is considered the worst natural disaster on record for the archipelago. Only months later, a group of cryptocurrency figures led by Bitcoin Foundation chairman Brock Pierce relocated to Old San Juan, gathering in hotels and purchasing a colonial building that previously housed a children's museum. The first reference to this migration in media happened in January 2018, when Jeremy Gardner said that "they're going to build a modern-day Atlantis out there". The new arrivals numbered in the dozens and were mostly composed by executives of firms (Ethereum Blockchain-as-a-Service entrepreneur Andrew Keys), early adopters, nouveau riche men that had benefited from the early adoption of bitcoin and its value rising in 2017, traders and investors, among other enthusiasts. According to a New York Times article that quoted Pierce, it was the economic environment that followed which convinced them to choose the ravaged archipelago. In the words of Fifth Avenue Capital's Stephen Morris, "It's only when everything's been swept away that you can make a case for rebuilding from the ground up". The group unveiled plans to build Puertopia or Sol, a city in which all transactions were made via digital currency and contracts codified in the underlying technology of blockchain. Located at in the derelict remains of Roosevelt Roads Naval Base in Ceiba, Puerto Rico, the project would include the first cryptocurrency-exclusive bank in the world and was to be a showcase for the group to promote their vision of "what a crypto future could look like". The group claimed that it would be investing in the local economy, in particular the widespread reconstruction efforts following the hurricane. The Puertopians are part of a larger group of clients that have fueled the creation of local businesses dealing with tax and legal advice for the incoming super rich. A number of foreign-owned banking institutions were created in Puerto Rico, including FV Bank, Mercantile Bank International (SJMX, formerly San Juan Merchantile Exchange) and a new iteration of the historical Medici Bank, all of which welcomed transactions in cryptocurrency. Bitcoin ATMs hosted by Bitstop and Athena Bitcoin began being installed, while Robots Inc. was granted a patent for a similar device. A pattern of decline in the value of digital coins during 2018 directly resulted in the dissolution of the San Juan-based noble bank. As the Puertopians began to lose money, some left Puerto Rico, while others adopted defensive measures while the possibility of a prolonged market crash, known as the "crypto winter", was forthcoming. As traders lost money initiatives involving local non-profits were abandoned, mainly those directed towards aiding the communities that remained affected by the hurricane. The goal to build a crypto city remains unfulfilled, with recent initiatives at Roosevelt Roads focusing on restoring its airport and establishing a spaceport. Pierce, who purchased a colonial building from the Catholic Church in 2020, has claimed that "these were loose ideas, nothing of which was concrete of well thought out". Puertopians themselves broadened their presence in the archipelago, retaining their home base in Old San Juan but acquiring properties in Dorado, Humacao, Rincón and the island municipality of Vieques.

During the summer of 2020, Puerto Rican software mogul Orlando Bravo became interested in bitcoin while vacationing at Dorado, purchasing an undisclosed amount of it and publicly speaking in its favor. By 2021, the influx had increased again, with the relocation of cryptocurrency hedge funds Pantera and Redwood City Ventures as well as the mining operations of CoinMint. Among these was Frances Haugen, who earned notoriety after exposing the inner workings of Facebook and had purchased enough cryptocurrency "at the right time". At the time, retired baseball player Alfredo Escalera publicly lobbied for more public policy, stating that "our governors should educate themselves about the development of the technology, the mining of the coins and the programming of the 'blockchains' to attract the thousands of investors that engage in this business worldwide." Crypto personality Amanda Cassatt and her husband Samuel relocated, as more individuals arrived from different states. However, this wave also brought individuals that did not receive Act 60 exemptions but also became involved with the community, such as Keiko Yoshino of the Puerto Rico Blockchain Trade Association.

Aware that the perception of the group became increasing contentious as property prices in San Juan increased, the Puertopians began to rebrand their efforts as "more inclusive, empowering and communal", individual-owned and linked them to the advent of Web3. As such, weekly events known as CryptoCurious and Crypto Mondays are organized with the general public as their targets. Local crypto entrepreneurs such as Juan Carlos Pedreira began to capitalize. According to the DEDC, at least 31 individuals classified as "crypto entrepreneurs" arrived to Puerto Rico in 2021, with potentially up to 100 involved in the industry. Among local corporations, the Díaz Fontanez Group was the first to pay the salary of its employees in digital currency, citing the move as a response to growing inflation in international markets.

The 2022 Puerto Rico Digital Trends Study published by the Sales & Marketing Executives Association (CME) placed overall awareness of cryptocurrencies in 67.7%, of which 40.6% "does not understand" how they work and another 30.5% "does not consider them trustworthy", with another 14.5% considering them "the money of the future". The temporary suspension of the physical presence requisite prior to hurricane Fiona led to YouTuber/investor Hayden Bowles publicly announcing that he was leaving the island prior to the event, sparking public backlash. Likewise, criticism was targeted at the group for failing to deliver on most of their proposals, including the construction of decentralized power grids backed by blockchain technology, following Maria and for failing to deliver funds gathered after the latest storm to local NPOs.

=== House of Representatives of Puerto Rico hearings on regulation ===
In January 2022, Speaker Tatito Hernández of the Popular Democratic Party (PPD), who has argued in favor of employing blockchain for tasks such as fighting public corruption, revealed that the House of Representatives of Puerto Rico was investigating the topic of creating a regulatory frame for cryptocurrency. House Resolution 527 was passed with the expressed intent of studying “the concept of blockchain as a government filing system, as well as the use of digital coins (cryptocurrency) as an accepted form of payment in Puerto Rico". Jesús Manuel Ortiz of the PPD, chair of the House of Representatives of Puerto Rico's Government Commission and who has publicly endorsed cryptocurrencies as the “scaffold of the worldwide economy in the near future", was responsible for the investigation. According to a February 2022 report, the Puerto Rico Department of Treasury has established that the acquisition of property and real estate using cryptocurrencies has become widespread in Puerto Rico. All of those involved in the hearings acknowledged that such transactions had become pervasive.

In representation of the PRDT, Ángel L. Pantoja recommend following the Internal Revenue Service (IRS) guidelines on the topic, given the political status of Puerto Rico and a lack of precedent. Natalia Zequeira, Financial Institutions Commissioner, emphasized that the volatility of cryptocurrencies had convinced banks to adopt “conservative positions" and after listing what she perceived as positives and negatives, concluded that once the regulatory framework is in place “Puerto Rico cannot fall behind. The future is all about markets, transactions and digital currency. It is imperative for us to be at the forefront of this technology". Speaking for the Puerto Rico Bankers Association, Zoimé Álvarez argued that in order to comply with Federal Deposit Insurance Corporation standards regulatory controls were required to prevent illegal activity such as “money laundering [or] terrorism financing". Afterwards, Ortiz made it clear that he had been satisfied and anticipated that bill will be presented to regulate cryptocurrencies in the jurisdiction.

On November 7, 2022, the Government Commission issued a positive report signed by Ortiz for the investigation of potential uses for the implementation of blockchain for public purposes and regulating cryptocurrencies. The DDEC created its own regulatory framework in February 2023, when it extended Law 60 tax exemptions to blockchain-related ventures. Before its defeat, P.C. 1565 was the subject of a public hearing on January 27, 2023, at which PRITS and the Puerto Rico Bankers Association supported the proposal. Days later, the PRHOR defeated P.C. 1565 with votes of 24–14, which was promoted by Ortiz and intended to create a task force, the Comité Asesor de la Asamblea Legislativa para implementar la tecnología Blockchain, to create a plan for the implementation of the technology within 180 days.

=== The 2022–2024 Crypto Winter ===
Some early-adoption crypto businesses, such as Anthena, have been pushed out of the island's market for failing to comply with local standards.

As the price of all cryptocurrencies fell systematically throughout 2022 and scandals such as FTX’s sudden bankruptcy contributed to the collapse, the Puertopians publicly dismissed the issue as cyclical and continued operations unconcerned, this despite facing additional criticism that Puerto Ricans that wanted to begin startups within the industry received little to no support from the investors. When queried, some shrugged off thousands of dollars in losses and that fewer people were attending their events at San Juan by saying that the devaluation had repelled “crypto tourists” away, even claiming that the “quality” of attendees had improved. The market collapse led to a decrease in settlers that moved to Puerto Rico expecting to become rich from their investment in the future, while sobriety overtook the longstanding Puertopians.

Pierce himself experienced a series of legal battles during this timeframe, with most lawsuits involving former business partners in acquisitions such as the former Vieques W Hotel and the refurbishing of a yacht named Aurora. Six years after the promised technology-driven economic revolution, the general public has yet to see the results, with cryptocurrencies remaining a niche in Puerto Rico. The former actor pointed to other blockchain related ventures such as the Lighthouse NFT Gallery as an example of “pioneering tech” being introduced to the globe from the island, but openly admitted that despite being the first of its class in the world the studio was not turning a profit. Despite the struggles of the Puertopians, a group of local residents formed by Amanda Fabiano, Tracy Hoyos López and David Bailey, managed to find its way into American national politics. After briefing Donald Trump on cryptocurrencies and public policy, they were held responsible by the media for the presidential candidate's shift in discourse between his 2020 and 2024 campaigns.

== Reception ==
=== Government and politics ===
The Puerto Rico Department of Treasury declined to comment on the issue, recognizing that they did not have an expert in cryptocurrency at the moment, but noted a future interest in having one. The Puerto Rico Office of the Commissioner of Financial Institutions has seen sufficient legitimacy to approve the existence of "Digital Internacional Bank" licenses, under the interpretation of international banking laws. However, unlike other locations where banks have suppressed the use of cryptocurrency, the Puerto Rico Bankers Association notes through president Zoimé Álvarez that they did not consider themselves "enemies" and that "[cryptocurrency] is here to stay, only being concerned by the irreversible nature of payments. When first interviewed about the topic, governor Ricardo Rosselló of the conservative Partido Nuevo Progresista (PNP) expressed that "there is still a lot of work to be done and giving clarity that this is not used for money laundering or it's not used for other areas", but favored widely adopting blockchain as a "game changer". Despite being in charge of the conference (named "Puerto Crypto") where relevant legislation is to be addressed, Manuel A. Laboy Rivera Secretary of Economic Development and Commerce of Puerto Rico (DEDC), expressed a lack of knowledge about the real reach of bitcoin within the Puerto Rican economy (despite it being recorded since the early 2010s) and speculated that some changes to the local financial regulations may be needed. When prodded about what these would involve, he states that they would revolve around fraud protection. Corporative lawyer Antonio Bauzá agreed and argued in favor of audits. In 2021, Carlos Fontán director of the invcentives program of the DEDC reaffirmed the government's assessment that the Puertopians were creating jobs.

By the time that he left office among public protests related to the Telegramgate, Rosselló was regarded as "supportive of crypto-entrepreneurial efforts " and among his final appointments was SJMX founder James Robert 'Bo' Collins to the board of Invest Puerto Rico. Wanda Vázquez Garced, who held the office for two years, increased the yearly fee paid by Act 60 beneficiaries from $300 to $5,000. Elected in 2020, PNP governor Pedro Pierluisi, who had publicly supported the tax incentives since his days as Resident Commissioner of Puerto Rico, resumed the favorable public policy. By 2019, the legal ramifications the topic was discussed in the University of Puerto Rico School of Law's Revista Jurídica, where Verónica S. Otero Rivera concluded that Acts 20 and 22 were designed for other types of business and that new legislation was needed for the model used by digital coins.

In 2021, OCIF commissioner Natalia Zequeira defended that a lack for formal regulation responded to an aversion to "innovation" in entities such as FDIC. She was later responsible for licensing the digital-asset custody and settlement services that the office authorized to FV Bank in November 2022. OCIF also ordered Athena to cease and desist its cryptocurrency operations in Puerto Rico until it received a MSB from the government, this after the unregulated operation of the BATMs was linked to irregular transactions involving stolen money and fake IDs in the municipality of Manatí.

Liberal factions including the Puerto Rican Independence Party (PIP) and Movimiento Victoria Ciudadana (MVC) have opposed the settlement of Puerto Rico by beneficiaries of Act 60, believing that it promotes displacement, with María de Lourdes Santiago presenting a bill to repel the benefits. Former gubernatorial candidate for the defunct Working People's Party, Rafael Bernabe Riefkohl, linked the influx of foreigners to the economic policies that the United States imposed following the Spanish–American War, and how they decimated the sugar industry in Puerto Rico, the subsequent implementation Operation Bootstrap and their relationship to previous migrations. In December 2022, Avraham Eisenberg was arrested in the island for pilfering more than a hundred million dollars by exploiting the Mango Markets platform to accumulate cryptocurrency loans, prior to this he was given Act 60 benefits by DDEC secretary Manuel Cidre.

=== Media ===
The largest newspaper in Puerto Rico, El Nuevo Día, has been covering cryptocurrency topics since 2014, with articles ranging from bitcoin adoption and local regulation to the establishment of Medici Bank. Most of these articles have been informative as opposed to investigative, with exceptions including a piece where Sharon Minelli Pérez created a profile of the "crypto enthusiasts" that had become involved since the "crypto boom" of 2017. Christian Gabriel Ramos Segarra has authored several articles about the topic for El Vocero in 2021, initially discussing the lack of formal regulation and how, in conjunction with price fluctuations of BTC, this had slowed down the widespread adoption among the general populace in Puerto Rico, citing that by this point the bulk of those involved was still in the influx of foreign traders. In another piece, he echoed the arguments of several traders including Pierce about the potential of cryptocurrency for economic development in Puerto Rico if properly regulated. When price of bitcoin improved in 2021, Aiola Virella of Metro Puerto Rico interviewed Juan Carlos Pedreira the concept of that coin displacing traditional currency within some markets as inflation increased.

When the Puertopians first made their presence known in 2018, Rafael Lenín López of WAPA-TV began an investigation for NotiCentro, the channel's news service. In it he interviewed a number of government officials, technological experts and economists, whose reactions varied between cautious support and skepticism. Eva Lloréns Vélez of Caribbean Business wrote about the regulation that would be required before Puerto Rico could become "a crypto-paradise", citing figures that discussed the legal and banking aspects of the idea. This publication also gave general coverage of other local topics related to cryptocurrency including regulation, the proposal for a digital coin known as "Kokicoin", the relationship between Noble bank and Tether and conferences including CoinAgenda. Digital newspaper NotiCel has published several pieces on cryptocurrency, with its staff adopting differing views on the subject following an initial report on the arrival of the Puertopians and the tax incentives. Eric De León Soto has written informative pieces about crypto banking and a proposal to create an investment fund promoted by Pierce. However, Adriana De Jesús Salamán has critical about the group, noting the suspicions surrounding them and writing about the acquisition of properties in Old San Juan and the arrival of the Special Economic Zones, which she labelled as "another experiment for Puerto Rico from the crypto-community". In 2022, Jeremy Ortiz Portalatín of Telemundo Puerto Rico's (WKAQ-TV) newsservice published an investigative series where he interviewed traders and politicians within the context of the ongoing inflation of the United States dollar, discussing the Puertopians, regulation and the Metaverse.

Abroad, journalists like Larisa Yarovaya and Brian Lucey of The Conversation have expressed concerns that the creation of Sol would result in crypto-colonialism. Mariah Espada of Time focused her coverage on the activists that opposed Act 60 beneficiaries including "crypto currency tycoons" and the perception that it fuels displacement and gentrification. Neil Strauss of Rolling Stone opted to publish a biographical article of Pierce and documented his day-to-day life as he intended "to turn Puerto Rico into a Burning Man utopia", discussing a number of personal quirks which prompt comparisons to cult leaders and hippies, but establishing his position as the de facto leader of the Puertopians. Chloe Watlington of The Baffler, disregarded the Puertopians' proposal to build a techno-utopia as a "battery of garbled catchphrases and slogans masquerading as business plans" and linked them "old colonial scams in Puerto Rico". Samantha Bee was critical of the arrival of these traders to Puerto Rico, calling the group "tax locusts" and hosting Manuel Natal in a segment of Full Frontal with Samantha Bee titled "Tax Locusts and Blockchain Bros".

Canadian author Naomi Klein shares a similar opinion in The Battle for Paradise: Puerto Rico Takes on the Disaster Capitalists, asserting that "the true religion here is tax avoidance". Writing for British newspaper The Times, Josh Glancy described the group as more idealistic, "self-assured and utopian" than Sillicon Valley tycoons, presenting them in a generally favorable light as an emerging "technological network".

=== Other demographics ===
Upon their arrival the general populace the concept was not well understood and often compared to the Iraqi dinar investment scam. In contrast, the idea of cryptocurrency was favored by young Puerto Ricans that are interested in technology, entrepreneurs and those involved in the creative industries. By 2018 some businesses began accepting bitcoin as a form of payment, as did individuals involved in services such as touristic taxis and Uber drivers. The first health care institution to accept cryptocurrency as a form of payment in Puerto Rico was Profesional Hospital Guaynabo located in the eponymous municipality. The media attention to the topic resulted in better awareness in the following years, reaching more blue collar workers. The increase in adoption also led to cryptocurrency being used by criminals that began requesting scam payments in bitcoin. Parallel to this, grassroots movements that oppose gentrification began to publicly oppose the arrival of the Puertopians along other beneficiaries of Act 60, led by an organization known as #AbolishAct60, which considers the acquisition of real state by these traders as a "predatory" practice as it takes place in conjunction with an ongoing migration of Puerto Ricans to Florida and other locations. The first instance took place in October 2018, when a young woman confronted Pierce while he was hosting an event named #RestartWeek. Local feminist group Taller Salud has protested Act 60 as it believes that "tax havens and inaccessible incentives for natives that have strengthened and upheld colonialism." This animosity extended to Puerto Ricans that cooperated with the group, who were referred to as "vendepatrias" (traitors) for their involvement. Amid a pattern of foreigners acquiring the increasingly expensive buildings in Old San Juan, posters depicting the Puertopians (in particular Pierce) with the caption “this is what our colonizers look like" began appearing throughout the colonial city along other beneficiaries of Act 60.

Among members of the stateside Puerto Ricans, artists Liat Berdugo and Emily Martinez, collectively known as Anxious to Make, created an exhibit known as "Eternal Boy Playground" that documented the reactions of people that opposed the arrival of the first wave cryptocurrency traders as disaster capitalism. Others like Diáspora en Resistencia have been actively trying to point the attention of Congress towards the issue, both to scrutinize Act 60 beneficiaries and to pressure the local government into action. In September 2022, Bad Bunny released the video for "El Apagón", which criticizes gentrification and a number of interest groups including "crypto bros".

== See also ==
- Akon City
- Bitcoin City
