= Chinameca =

Chinameca may refer to:

El Salvador

- Chinameca, San Miguel, San Miguel Department
- Chinameca (volcano)
- Chinameca Sporting Club, a football team
- San Francisco Chinameca, La Paz Department

Mexico

- Chinameca, Morelos
- Chinameca Municipality, Veracruz
