= Conchagua =

- District
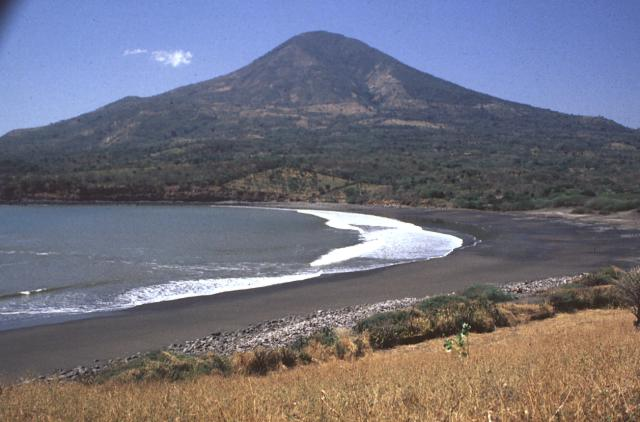

- Location in El Salvador
- Coordinates: 13°18′N 87°52′W
- Country: El Salvador
- Department: La Unión Department

Area
  - Total: 77.47 sq mi (200.64 km^{2})
- Elevation: 961 ft (293 m)

Population (2007)
  - Total: 37,362

Conchagua is a district in the La Unión department of El Salvador. It contains the Conchagua volcano. The Airport of the Pacific is being built in the district.
