= Punta El Chiquirín =

Punta El Chiquirîn
- Punta El Chiquirín (Conchagua volcano in view)

- Location in El Salvador
- Country: El Salvador
- Departamento: La Unión
- Coordinates: 13° 17′ 44″ N 87° 46′ 57″ W
- Time zone: UTC-6 (El Salvador Standard Time)

Punta El Chiquirín is the easternmost point of the mainland coast of El Salvador.

It is located in the departamento of La Unión and it overlooks the Gulf of Fonseca. Conchagua volcano can be seen to tower over the black sandy beach at Punta El Chiquirín, at a height of 1225m.
