= Bosque Conchagua =

Forest in El Salvador

Coordinates: 13°15′52″N 87°50′35″W

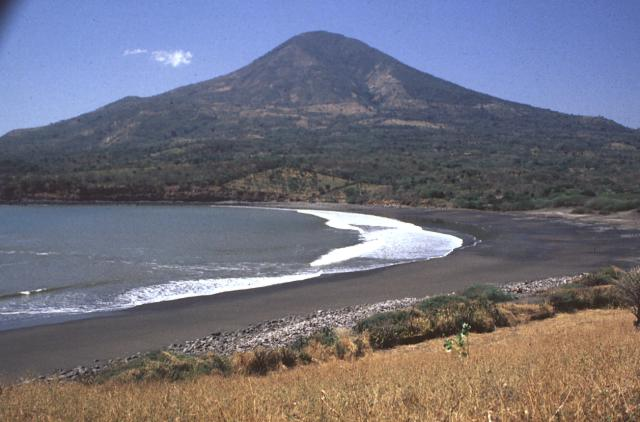
The forested area around Conchagua (volcano)

Bosque Conchagua is a coastal forest of the La Unión Department, southeastern El Salvador. It forms the landscape around the Conchagua volcano. It lies south of La Unión, opposite Isla Conchaguita and the Gulf of Fonseca.

The forest is home to about 65 species of bird.
