= Taburete =

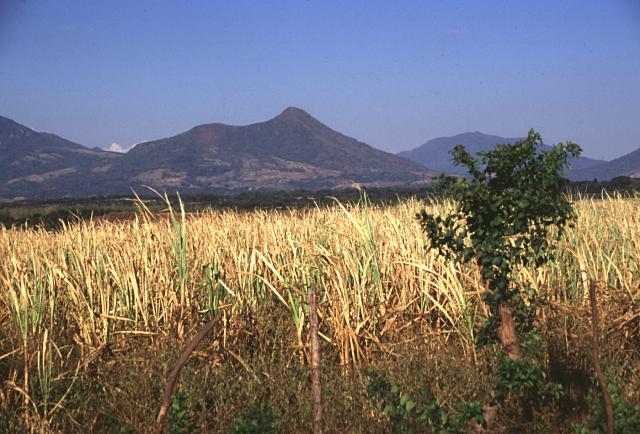
- Taburete volcano seen from the southwest

Highest point
- Elevation: 1,172 m (3,845 ft)
- Coordinates: 13°26′06″N 88°31′55″W

Geography
- Location within El Salvador
- Location: Usulután Department, El Salvador

Geology
- Mountain type: Stratovolcano
- Volcanic arc: Central America Volcanic Arc
- Last eruption: Unknown

Taburete is a stratovolcano in central El Salvador, rising above the coastal plain between the San Vicente and San Miguel volcanoes, and just west of Usulután volcano. It is topped by a well-preserved, 150–300 m (490–980 ft) deep summit crater, with the true summit on the south side of the crater rim.

== See also ==
- List of volcanoes in El Salvador
- List of stratovolcanoes
