= Tecapa =

Complex stratovolcano in El Salvador

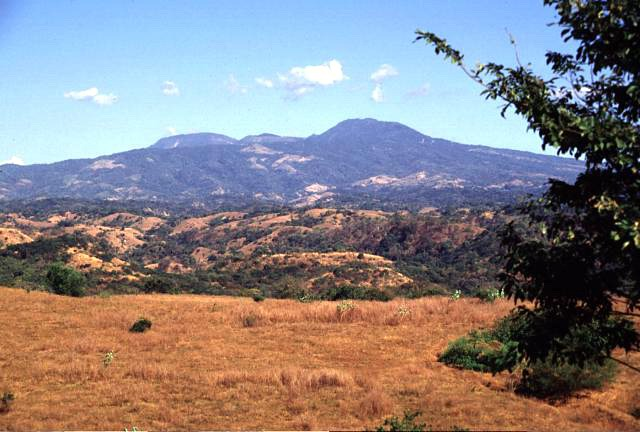
- Tecapa in 1999

Highest point
- Elevation: 1,593 m (5,226 ft)
- Coordinates: 13°29′38″N 88°30′07″W

Geography
- Location within El Salvador
- Location: Usulután Department, El Salvador

Geology
- Mountain type: Stratovolcano
- Volcanic arc: Central America Volcanic Arc
- Last eruption: Unknown

Tecapa is a complex stratovolcano in central El Salvador.

== See also ==
- List of volcanoes in El Salvador
- List of stratovolcanoes
