= C.D. Águila San Isidro =

Águila San Isidro
- Full name: Club Deportivo Águila San Isidro
- Ground: Hacienda San Isidro, Chinameca
- Chairman: Dr. Enrique García Prieto
- League: Tercera Division (3rd Division)
Home colours

Club Deportivo Águila San Isidro is a Salvadoran football club, which currently plays in the Salvadoran Third Division.

The club is based near Chinameca at an altitude of 1,250 meters above sea level what makes them hard to beat at home.

== History ==
They won promotion to the second tier of domestic football in 2006/2007 but were forced to sell that promotion slot to Once Lobos due to lack of funds. Again, in 2008, Águila San Isidro won promotion to the Salvadoran second division, this time after beating Liberal I.R. in a promotion/relegation playoff and they did go up this time.

== Notable coaches ==
- (El Salvador) Jorge Garay
- (El Salvador) Juan Ramón Paredes (2008–2009)
