= Paul Gibson (baseball) =

American baseball player (born 1960)

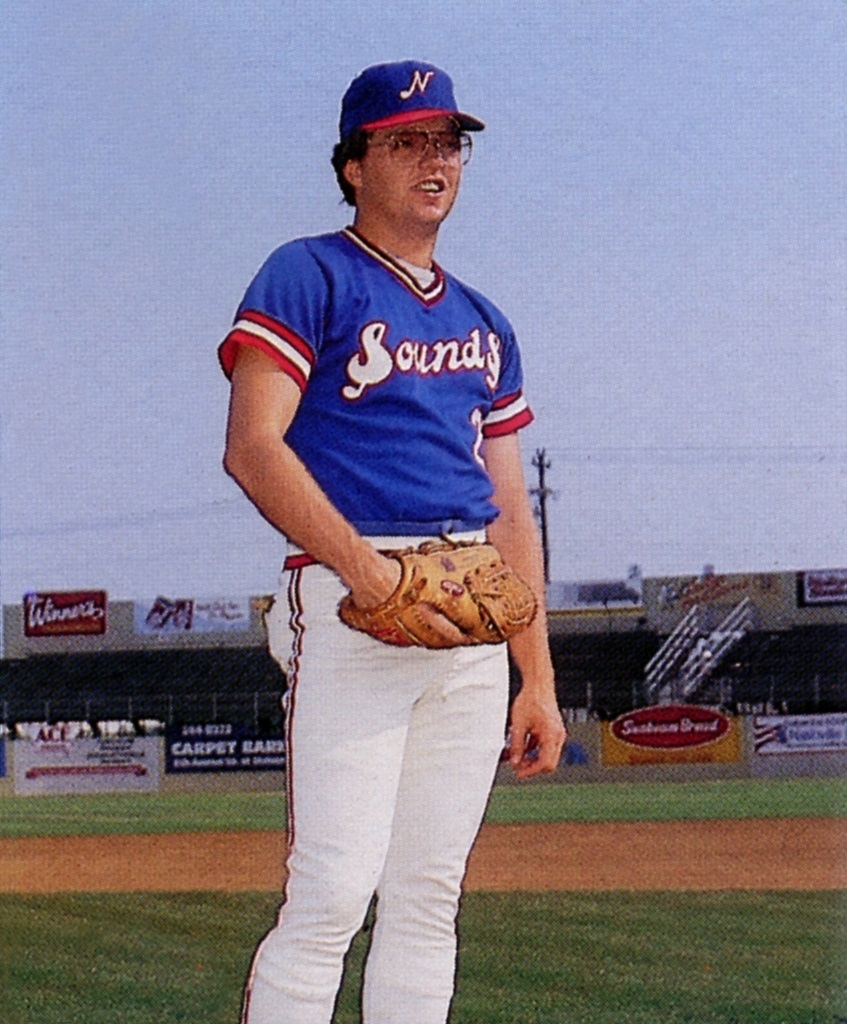
- Gibson with the Nashville Sounds in 1986
- Pitcher
- Born: January 4, 1960 (age 66); Southampton, New York, U.S.
- Batted: Right Threw: Left

MLB debut
- April 8, 1988, for the Detroit Tigers

Last MLB appearance
- May 27, 1996, for the New York Yankees

MLB statistics
- Win–loss record: 22–24
- Earned run average: 4.07
- Strikeouts: 345
- Stats at Baseball Reference

Teams
- Detroit Tigers (1988–1992); New York Mets (1992–1993); New York Yankees (1993–1994, 1996)

Paul Marshall Gibson, Jr. (born January 4, 1960) is an American former professional baseball pitcher.

== Career ==
The Cincinnati Reds drafted Gibson in the third round of the 1978 Major League Baseball draft, but released him in 1981. The Detroit Tigers signed him in May 1981. In December 1982, the Minnesota Twins took Gibson in the Rule 5 draft, but granted him free agency in 1984, whereupon the Tigers reacquired him.

Gibson made his major league debut on April 8, 1988, in a game against the Kansas City Royals. After the season he was honored as Tigers Rookie of the Year. In January 1992, the Tigers traded Gibson and minor leaguer Randy Marshall to the New York Mets for Mark Carreon and Tony Castillo. The Mets released Gibson in mid-1993, and he was signed by the New York Yankees. In 1994, the Yankees sent Gibson to the Milwaukee Brewers, who granted him free agency at the end of the season. The Toronto Blue Jays signed Gibson in April 1995, but released him in June. In July, the Pittsburgh Pirates signed Gibson but granted him free agency in October. The Yankees signed him again in December of that year but released him for the last time in May 1996.

Paul currently owns Paul Gibson's Baseball Academy in Long Island, New York. He was inducted into the Suffolk Sports Hall of Fame on Long Island in the Baseball Category with the Class of 1994.

== Scouting career ==
Gibson is regarded as a projector scout, which envisions what a player will be able to do in a two- or three-year term. Despite the fact that Gibson had a successful pitching career, he has been able to analyze players' ability regardless of their position. Gibson's style of scouting also looks for particular traits in a player's personality and character to ensure that they can handle pressure and be team leaders.

Beginning in 2006, Gibson served as an area scout supervisor for the Atlanta Braves. During his tenure with the Braves, he was in charge of all scouting aspects of amateur players in the Northeast.

In 2008, the Seattle Mariners' Director of Amateur Scouting, Tom McNamara, named Gibson as the Eastern Cross-Checker Scout for the organization. Gibson was part of a bigger plan in which he was expected to work closely with the Mariners baseball operations department and scouting staff in evaluating talent for the amateur draft.

In 2010, Gibson joined the Kansas City Royals scouting office as the National Scouting Supervisor.

Under Gibson’s supervision, the Royals signed Bubba Starling, Kyle Zimmer, Cam Gallagher, and Alfredo Escalera–Maldonado, at 17, the youngest player ever drafted by any MLB organization since the insertion of the First-Year Player Draft.

== Baseball instructor career ==
In 1995, Gibson opened a baseball training facility in Bellport, New York, with the intention to provide proper baseball instruction to young kids in the community in which he grew up. A year later, Gibson inaugurated a 10,000 square foot indoor facility that housed batting cages and small lesson areas for local instructors during the winter.

Notable Facility Alumni
| Alumni | Achievement |
|---|---|
| Glenn Gibson | 2006 4th round pick, Washington Nationals. LHP |
| Chris Smith | 2001 11th round pick (HS). 2002 1st round pick, Baltimore Orioles |
| Mike Parisi | 2004 9th round pick, St. Louis Cardinals |
| Rick Ricobono | 1998 6th round pick, Boston Red Sox (HS) |
| Andy Salvo | 2001 22nd round pick, Chicago White Sox |
| Estee Harris | 2003 2nd round pick, NY Yankees (HS) |
| Jeff Muessig | 2001 20th round pick, Oakland Athletics |
| Jon Searles | 1998 8th round pick, Pittsburgh Pirates (HS) |
| Brian Johnson | 2004 30th round pick, Milwaukee Brewers |
| Pete Munro | 1993 6th round pick, Boston Red Sox (HS), 6 years in majors. Started the 2004 NLCS for the Houston Astros. |
| Bryan Hansen | 2001 6th round pick, Philadelphia Phillies (HS) |
| Jason Appeal | 2004 27th round pick, Philadelphia Phillies (HS) |
| Jon Kalkau | 2003 41st round pick, Montreal Expos (HS) |
| B. J. Lamura | 2002 5th round pick, Chicago White Sox |
| Jesse Torborg | 2001 41st round pick Arizona. 2003 37th round pick, Philadelphia Phillies (HS) |
| Mike Ambort | 2003 44th round pick Montreal Expos (HS) |
| Bryan Sabatella | 2005 9th Round Seattle Mariners INF |
| John Lannan | 2005 11th Round Washington Nationals LHP |

== Infamous error card ==
Gibson's 1989 Score baseball card initially featured an "error" and was reprinted in a "corrected" form. On the card, Gibson is showing preparing to deliver the pitch as an infielder stands by second base. The first version shows the infielder grabbing his crotch. After the oddity was noticed by collectors, the card became briefly popular, especially after Score reissued the card with the infielder's arm airbrushed out.
