= List of volcanoes in El Salvador =

Volcanoes in El Salvador

This is a list of active and extinct volcanoes in El Salvador.

== Volcanoes ==
Name	Elevation		Location	Last eruption
Name	meters	feet	Coordinates	Last eruption
Apaneca Range	2036	6680	13.891°N 89.786°W	Holocene
Apastepeque Volcanic Field	700	2297	13.72°N 88.77°W	Holocene
Chingo	1775	5823	14.12°N 89.73°W	Holocene
Cerro Cinotepeque	665	2182	14.02°N 89.25°W	Holocene
Cerro Singüil	957	3140	14.05°N 89.65°W	Holocene
Chinameca	1300	4265	13.478°N 88.330°W	Holocene
Coatepeque Caldera	746	2447	13.87°N 89.55°W	Holocene
Conchagua	1225	4019	13.275°N 87.845°W	unknown
Conchagüita	505	1657	13.229°N 87.767°W	Pleistocene
El Tigre	1640	5381	13.47°N 88.43°W	Holocene
Guazapa	1438	4718	13.90°N 89.12°W	Holocene
Ilopango	450	1476	13.672°N 89.053°W	1880
Izalco	1950	6398	13.813°N 89.633°W	1966
Laguna Aramuaca	181	594	13.428°N 88.105°W	Holocene
San Diego	781	2562	14.27°N 89.48°W	Holocene
San Miguel	2130	6988	13.434°N 88.269°W	2022
San Salvador	1893	6211	13.734°N 89.294°W	1917
San Vicente	2182	7159	13.595°N 88.837°W	Holocene
Santa Ana	2381	7812	13.853°N 89.630°W	2005
Taburete	1172	3845	13.435°N 88.532°W	Holocene
Tecapa	1593	5226	13.494°N 88.502°W	Holocene
Usulután	1449	4754	13.419°N 88.471°W	Holocene

== See also ==
- Central America Volcanic Arc
- List of volcanoes in Guatemala
- List of volcanoes in Honduras
- List of volcanoes in Nicaragua
