= Airport of the Pacific =

Airport under construction in El Salvador

Airport of the Pacific Aeropuerto del Pacífico
- The Airport of the Pacific under construction, November 2026
- IATA: none; ICAO: none

Summary
- Airport type: Public/military
- Owner: Government of El Salvador
- Operator: Autonomous Port Executive Commission (CEPA)
- Serves: La Unión and Bitcoin City
- Location: Conchagua, El Salvador
- Opened: 2027 (planned)
- Built: 2025–present
- Time zone: CST (UTC–6)
- Elevation AMSL: 56 ft (17 m)
- Coordinates: 13°11′46″N 87°56′25″W
- Website: Official website
- Interactive map of Airport of the Pacific

Runways
| Direction | Length | | Surface |
| Direction | ft | m | Surface |
|---|---|---|---|
| TBD | 7,874 | 2,400 | TBD |

The Airport of the Pacific (Spanish: Aeropuerto del Pacífico), also known as the International Airport of the Pacific (Aeropuerto Internacional del Pacífico) or the Airport of the East (Aeropuerto de Oriente), is an under-construction joint-use civilian international airport and military base located in Conchagua, El Salvador. It will serve the city of La Unión and the planned Bitcoin City.

The airport was proposed by Salvadoran president Nayib Bukele during his 2019 presidential campaign as a part of his Cuscatlán Plan and construction was approved by the Legislative Assembly on 26 April 2022. Preliminary terraforming began in March 2023 and construction began in 2025. The airport's construction has received opposition from landowners and residents in the area as well as concerns of the environmental impact it would have on the local ecosystem.

== Planning ==
=== Initial proposals ===
Ahead of the 2019 presidential election, then-presidential candidate Nayib Bukele published his Cuscatlán Plan, an outline of his objectives and goals as president of El Salvador; among his proposals included the construction of a new airport in eastern El Salvador. Bukele stated that many of the passengers who passed through El Salvador's Saint Óscar Romero International Airport in south-central El Salvador live in eastern El Salvador. He argued that a new airport in the east would simultaneously ease congestion of El Salvador's main international airport and both bring jobs and an economic boost to the east of the country.

On 9 March 2020, the Salvadoran government launched "Pacific Airport Project", an international public offering to foreign companies to study the design of the airport. In total, 44 companies showed interest in the project and 11 of those presented economic models to the Salvadoran government. On 24 February 2022, the government was given an economic and financial report by Peyco-ALBEN 4000 Consortium, an air transportation company. The report estimated that the airport would create 4,700 new jobs in its first year of operation. The plan estimated that in the first ten years of operation, the airport would accommodate 1 to 3 million passengers and around 18,000 aircraft movements. Federico Anliker, the president of the Autonomous Port Executive Commission (CEPA) separately estimated that the airport's construction would create over 23,700 new jobs.

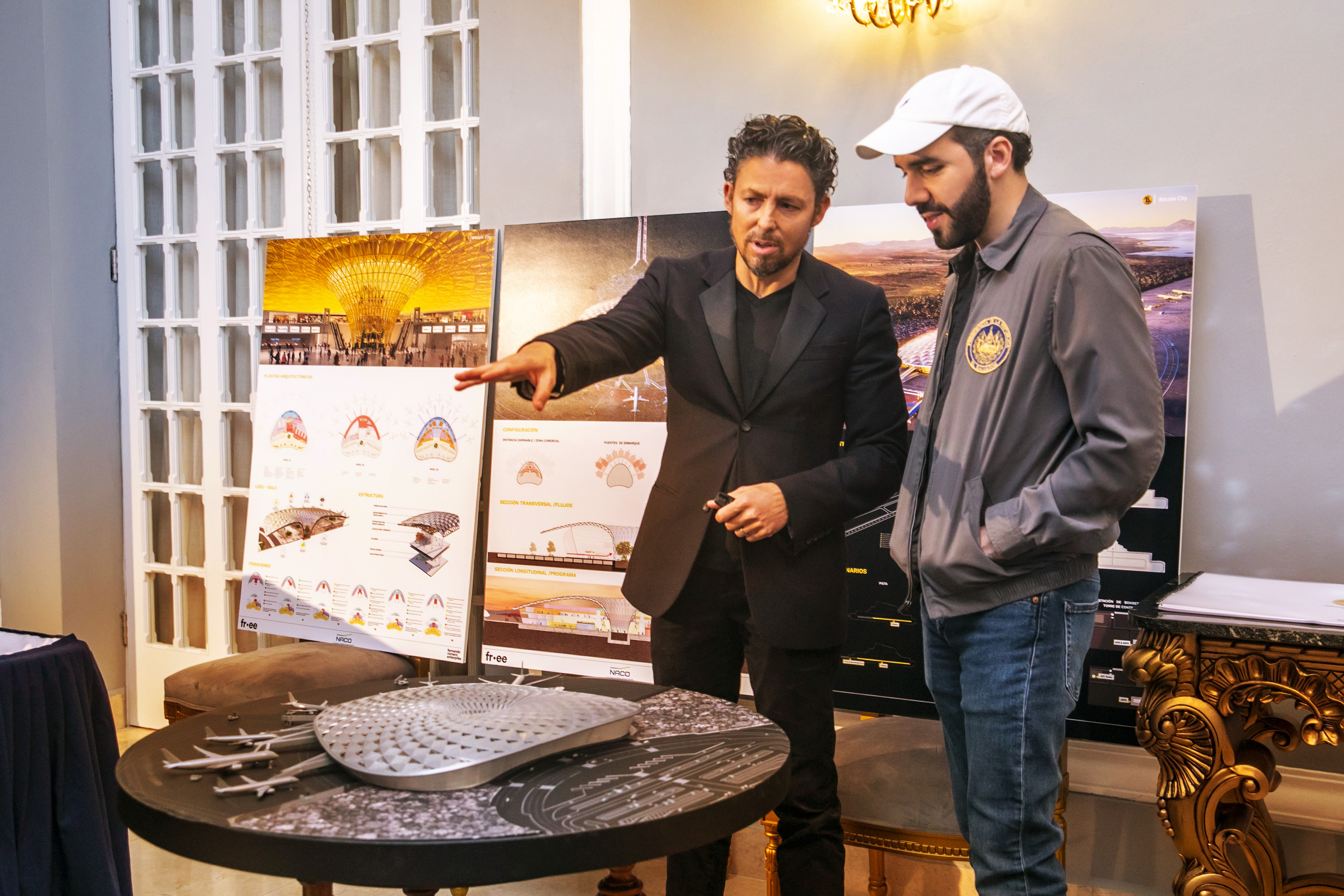
Salvadoran president Nayib Bukele and Mexican architect Fernando Romero viewing a concept model of Terminal α

In March 2022, CEPA confirmed that the airport would be located in the Condadillo caserío of Conchagua, a district of the La Unión department just south of the city of La Unión and the planned Bitcoin City. The residents of Condadillo and the nearby caserío of Flor de Mangle would be relocated due to the airport's construction. The location has an elevation of 56 feet (17 m).

=== Government approval ===
On 25 April 2022, the Legislative Assembly's Economic Commission approved a law for the construction of the airport. The following day the full Legislative Assembly approved the law, titled "Law for the Construction, Administration, Operation, and Maintenance of the Airport of the Pacific", with 67 of the 84 votes to officially authorize the construction of the airport. According to the Legislative Assembly, nine locations were considered; six were eliminated due to the perceived difficulty that landing airplanes would face and the Legislative Assembly settled on the selected site to minimize effects on the environment.

== Facilities ==
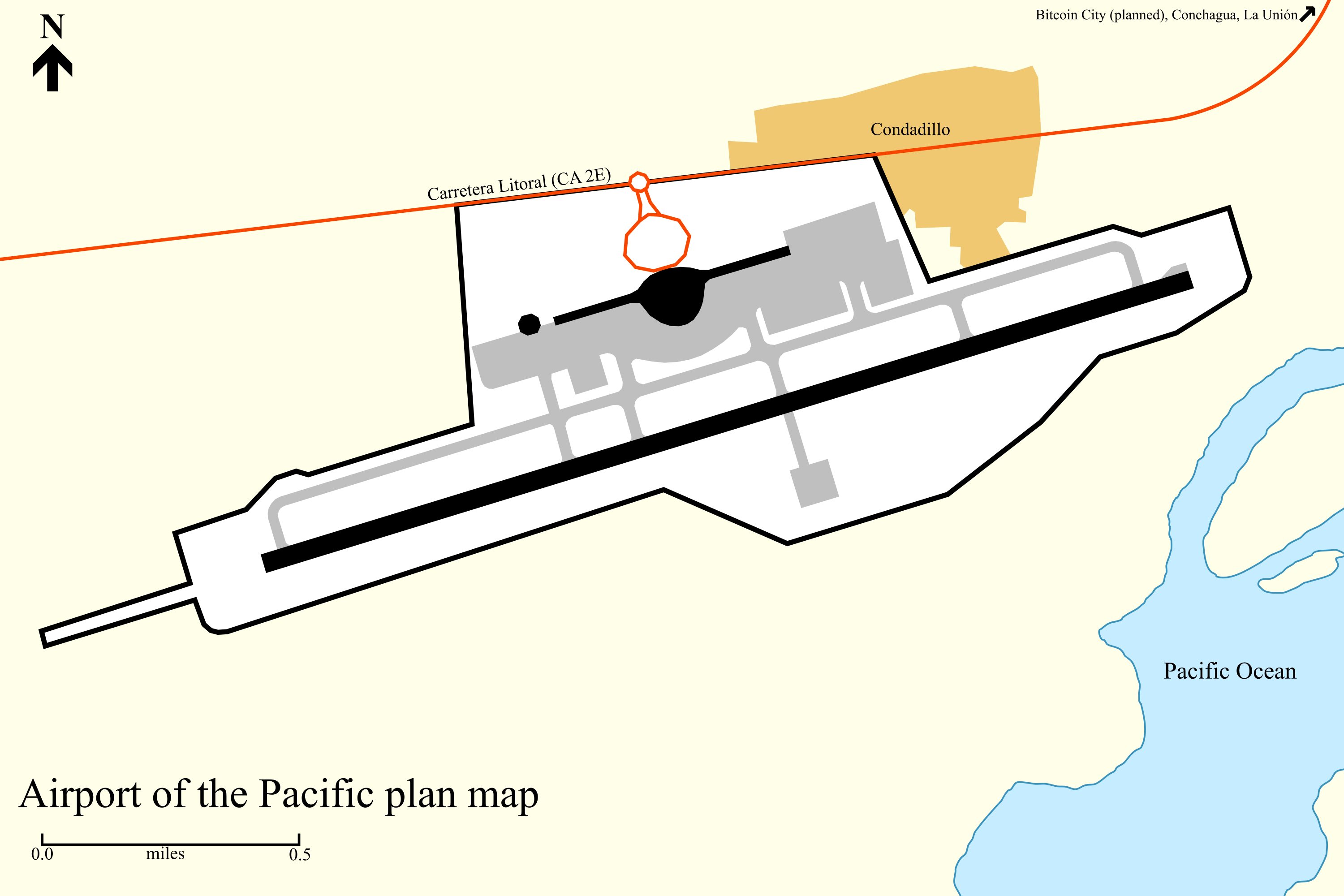
A map of the Airport of the Pacific's planned location near the caserío of Condadillo

The Airport of the Pacific will have two passenger terminals (known as Terminals α and β) with a combined total of 18 gates. Terminal α, the larger of the two terminals, will have floor space for check-in, baggage claim, customs, restaurants, and other commercial spaces. Terminal β, the smaller terminal, will service private flights. The airport will have one 7,874-foot-long (2,400 m)—later to be expanded to 9,850 feet (3,000 m)—and 148-foot-wide (45 m) runway and turnaround platforms at the ends of the runway for aircraft to position themselves for takeoff. According to Bukele, the Airport of the Pacific will meet Federal Aviation Administration (FAA) and International Civil Aviation Organization (ICAO) international standards. The Airport of the Pacific will also have a Salvadoran Air Force installation. The airport will cover around 600 manzanas (approximately 300 acres) (Note: In El Salvador, 1 manzana is just under 2 acres.) of land. Mexican architect Fernando Romero designed the airport.

According to Oscar Avalle, a representative of the Development Bank for Latin America, the Airport of the Pacific will initially have two gates that will be able to serve two or three planes each. He added that the airport would be able to be expanded if demand for tourism to eastern El Salvador increased. Avalle stated that aircraft such as the Airbus A320, Boeing 737, and Boeing 757 would be able to land at the airport. The government estimates that the airport will initially service 300,000 passengers annually when opened and up to 5 million passengers annually once completed.

== Construction ==
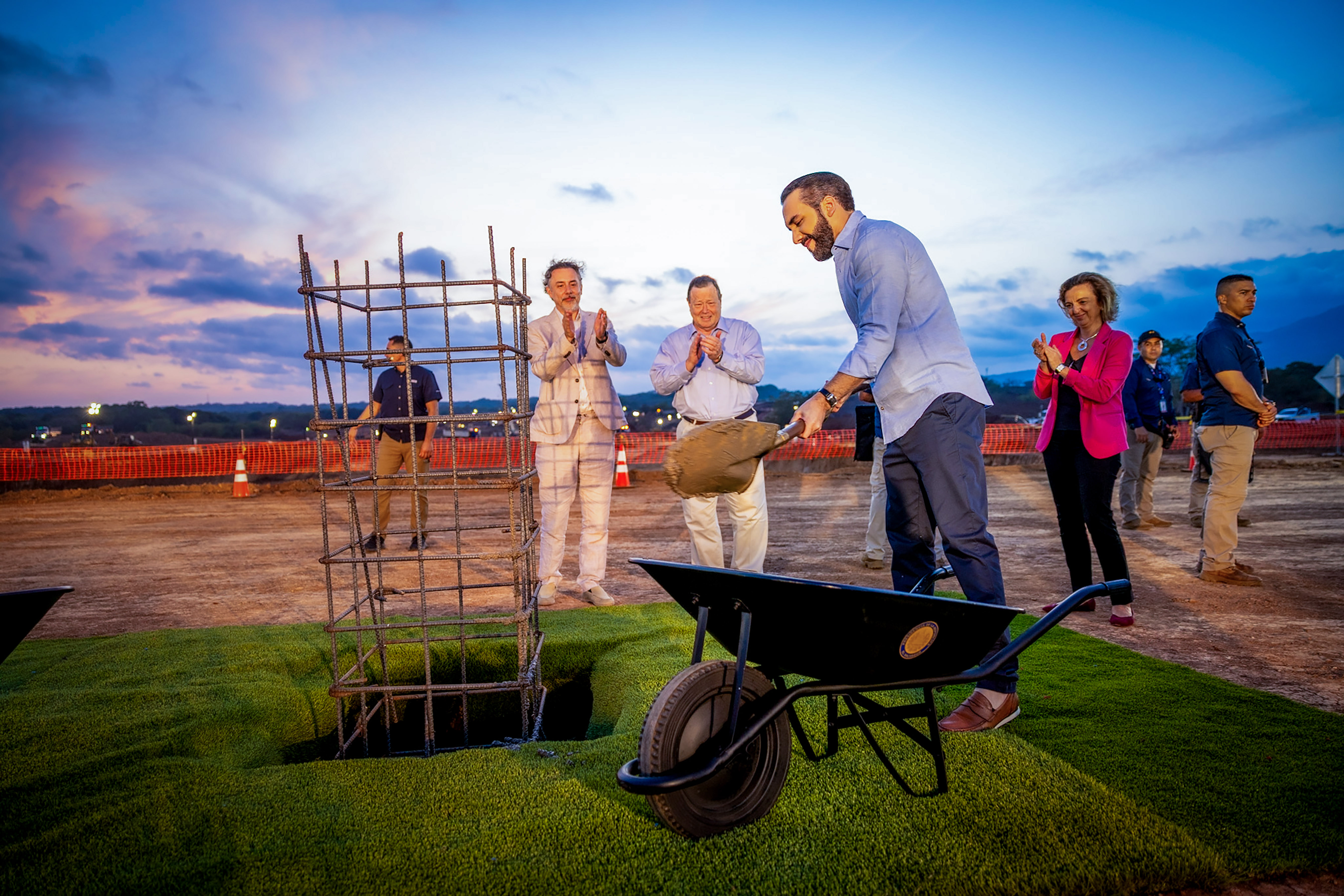
Nayib Bukele, Fernando Romero, and William H. Duncan at the airport's groundbreaking ceremony

Preliminary terraforming for the Airport of the Pacific began in March 2023. In October 2024, CEPA announced that construction would begin in 2025. Anliker stated that the government was moving at a "very accelerated pace" ("paso bastante acelerado") regarding the airport's construction. In April 2022, the government estimated that construction would cost US$500 million over 10 years.

External videos
- First stone of the Airport of the Pacific

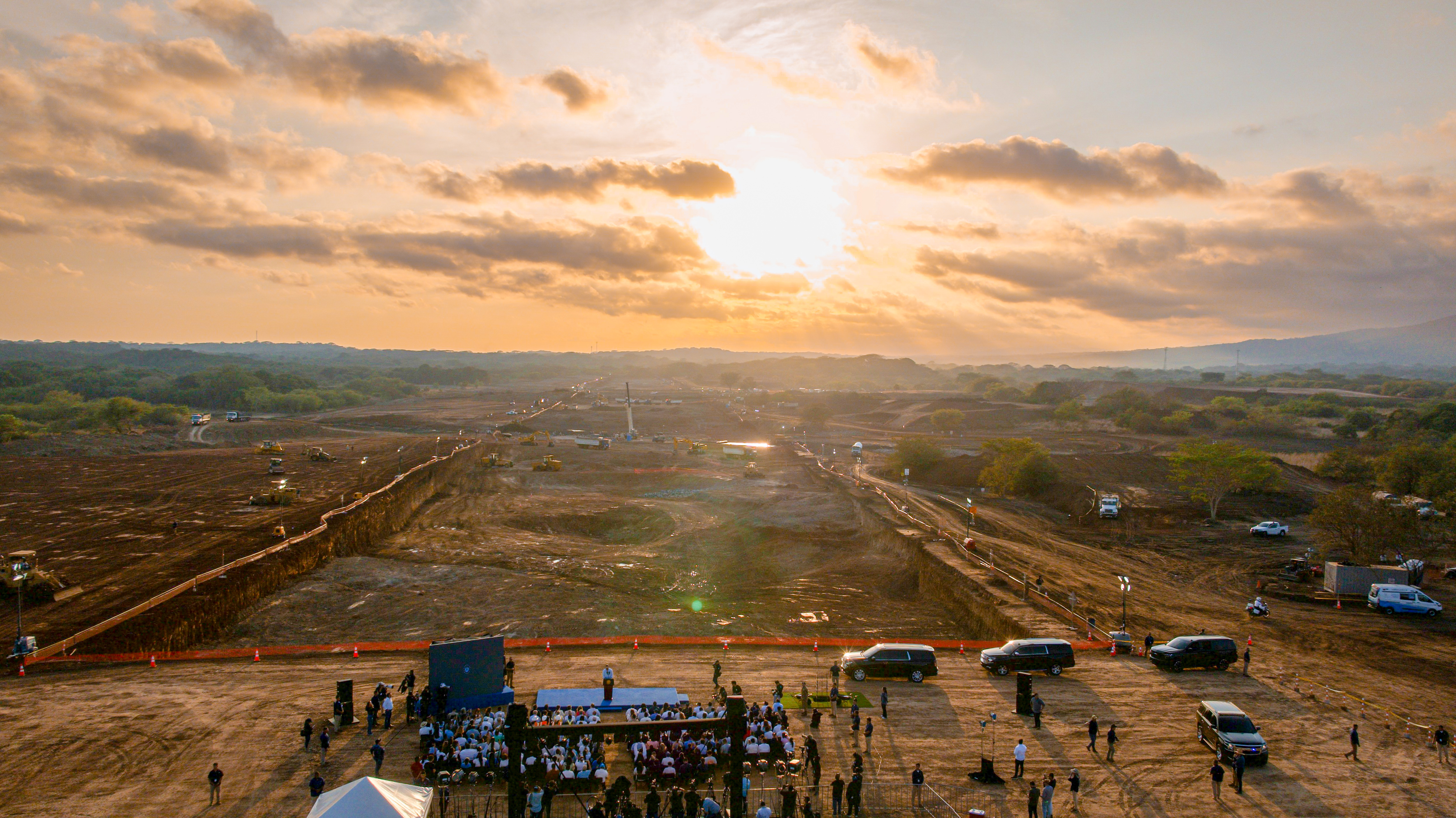
The airport's terraformed runway

On 25 February 2025, Bukele held ceremony to inaugurate the groundbreaking of construction for the airport. During a speech, Bukele stated that the project would be built over three phases. A few months prior, Bukele stated that the airport would be inaugurated in two years' time. Bukele estimated that phase one—the construction of a small passenger terminal that will later be converted for use as a private terminal—would cost US$386 million. The Salvadoran government expects the airport to become operational by 2027, after which, phase two will begin the construction of the airport's main passenger terminal; phase three will expand the passenger terminal. In January 2026, CEPA reported that 75 percent of terraforming work was complete.

=== Opposition ===
In October 2022, 10 of the 150 landowners affected by the airport's construction stated that they would not sell their land to the government. CEPA stated that they will seek to come to a settlement with the landowners and Federico Anliker, the president of CEPA, accused them of being manipulated by political parties in the opposition to delay the airport's construction. In January 2023, Cristosal, a non-governmental organization, filed a lawsuit claiming that three laws, including one for the airport's construction, would "open the door to corruption" ("abren la puerta a la corrupción") and called upon the Supreme Court of Justice to block the laws. According to rights groups, 225 families in Condadillo and Flor de Mangle were displaced by the airport's construction and that some had not yet been compensated by the government, while Bukele stated that 39 families were relocated and that there were no forced displacements.

Manuel Flores, the leader of the Farabundo Martí National Liberation Front (FMLN), criticized the airport's construction as it is being built with loaned money. He also remarked that it "is crazy" ("es una locura") that El Salvador is building a third international airport after the Saint Óscar Romero International Airport and the Ilopango International Airport.

=== Environmental concerns ===
In October 2021, the Ministry of the Environment and Natural Resources (MARN) advised CEPA to change the location of the Airport of the Pacific citing environmental concerns. MARN suggested moving the airport slightly to the northeast, as its planned location disrupted the habitats of several endangered species and was at risk of being submerged by rising sea levels. CEPA did not accept MARN's recommendation. The Indigenous Movement for the Integration of the Struggles of the Ancestral Peoples of El Salvador (MILPA) argues that the airport's construction violates the local people's right to private property and degrades the area's environment. In February 2025, MILPA coordinator Ángel Flores described the area of the airport's construction as "highly degraded" ("altamente degradado") and raised concerns regarding deforestation; by December 2024, 462 manzanas (approximately 230 acres) of land had been deforested. Some locals also lost access to running water.

Bukele addressed environmental concerns in a speech for construction's groundbreaking. He stated that the government would reforest nearby areas to compensate for the trees that were cut down during construction, install barriers to prevent nearby bodies of water from becoming contaminated, and monitor levels of air and noise pollution. In an interview, Anliker said that the airport's construction zone was not inside an environmental protected area and that MARN had given CEPA permission to build the airport in its location.

== Airlines and destinations ==
Bukele has stated that several airlines had made agreements with the government for direct flights from the United States to the Airport of the Pacific. Among airlines interested in operating out of the airport include Avianca El Salvador (whose CEO pledged to begin operations the day the airport opens) and Volaris El Salvador. The Salvadoran government wants the airport to offer international connections to Europe and Asia.

== See also ==
- List of airports in El Salvador
