= Apastepeque Volcanic Field =

The Apastepeque Volcanic Field is in El Salvador, Central America. The volcanic field is 8 kilometers north of a small town in central El Salvador called San Vicente. The last eruption of the volcano is unknown, however scientists have concluded that it was around 10, 000 years ago.

== Volcanic Speculations ==
- Elevation: 700 m (2297 ft.)
- Types: Cinder cone, lava dome, and maars
- Coordinates:13.72°N 88.77°W
- Last eruption: Holocene

== See also ==
- List of volcanoes in El Salvador
