= Chingo =

Stratovolcano between El Salvador and Guatemala

Volcán Chingo
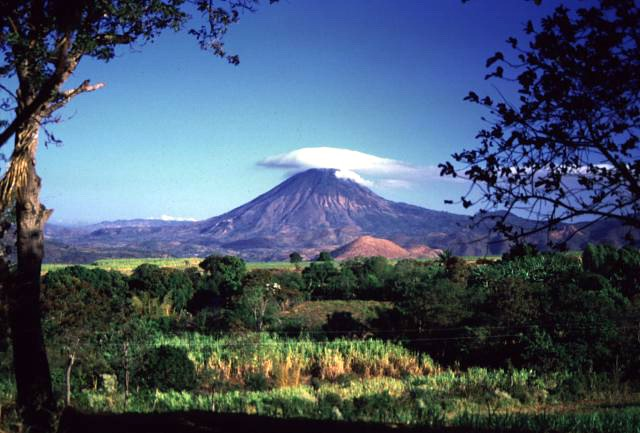
- Chingo in 1999

Highest point
- Elevation: 1,775 m (5,823 ft)
- Coordinates: 14°07′12″N 89°43′48″W

Geography
- Location within Guatemala
- Location: Jutiapa, Guatemala; Santa Ana, El Salvador

Geology
- Mountain type: Stratovolcano
- Volcanic arc: Central America Volcanic Arc
- Last eruption: Unknown

Volcán Chingo is a stratovolcano on the border between Guatemala and El Salvador. The highest point on the Guatemala/ El Salvador border is Volcán Chingo at 5,823 feet. It is also known to be the second highest of a group of volcanoes in the SE Guatemala region. The population of people living within 30 km of the Volcán Chingo is estimated to be around 867,678 people. There are no historical eruptions documented for this volcano but it is currently active. The exact volcano number when trying to locate it in the Smithsonian website is 342170.

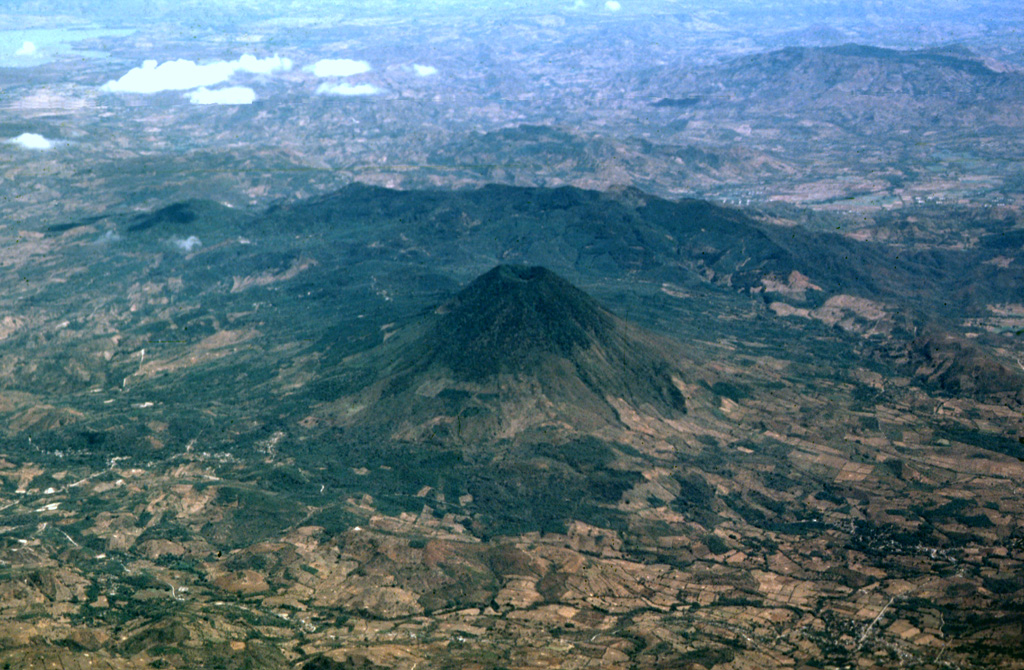
This aerial view is from the SW, the Guatemala side.

== Geology ==
This symmetrical stratovolcano has many different features that make it stand out to be the highest point on the border between Guatemala and El Salvador. There is a small, oval shaped crater on the summit that is breached towards the west side of the volcano. Different flank fissures have fed many youthful lava flows that can be found West and North of the volcano. There is a light brown hill located below the volcano on the right center side that is known as Cerro Laguneta.

The different rock types that can be found are Andesite/ Basaltic Andesite and Basalt/ Picro-Basalt.

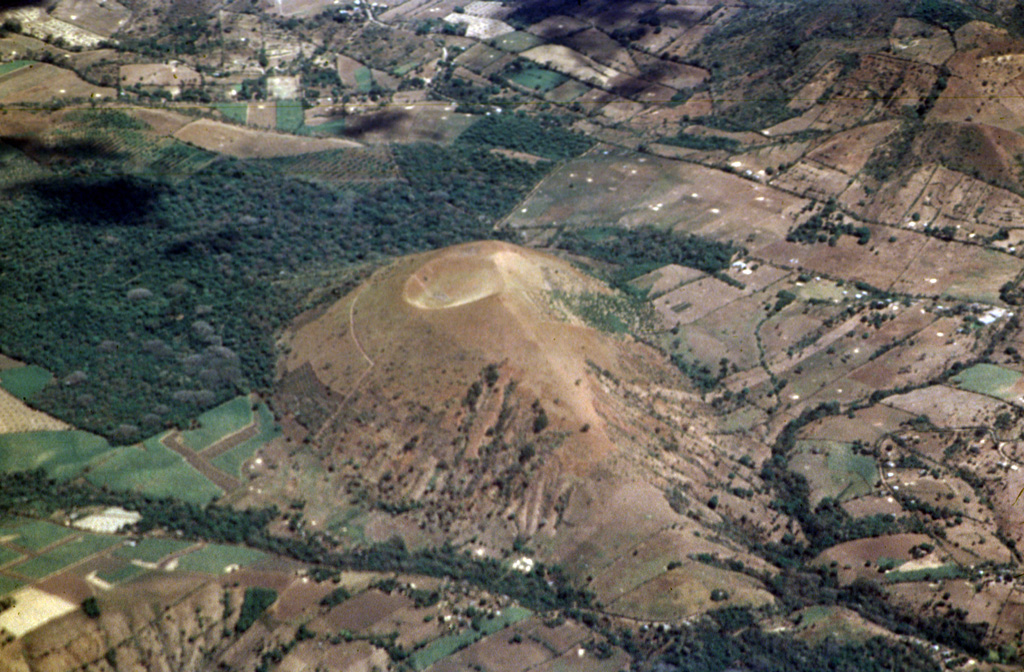
Cerro La Olla

Cerro la Olla, a youthful cone, is located on the South side of the volcano across the Salvadorian border. A cinder cone that caps the basalt shield, Volcan las Viboras, lies to the North and is the most prominent of several controlled cones in the area.

== Ecosystem ==
Sobralia amabilis is an elusive flower located in the Guatemala El Salvador region. The Sobralia amabilis of "Orchidaceae" was registered near the top of Volcán Chingo and was the only recorded sighting in local Guatemala. Based on the findings of the Sobralia amabilis on the Volcán Chingo, ecologists speculate there could be other populations in the area.

The valley underneath the Volcano chingo is home to nutrient rich soil perfect to grow coffee beans. Peregrine Roasters grows coffee beans in the shade under Inga edulis trees at the base of the volcano. "Volcán Chingo", the name of the coffee, was farmed in the Jutiapa Region of Guatemala on the Marcelita Estate.

== See also ==
- List of volcanoes in Guatemala
- List of volcanoes in El Salvador
