= Bitcoin City =

Planned smart city project in El Salvador

- Proposed planned city
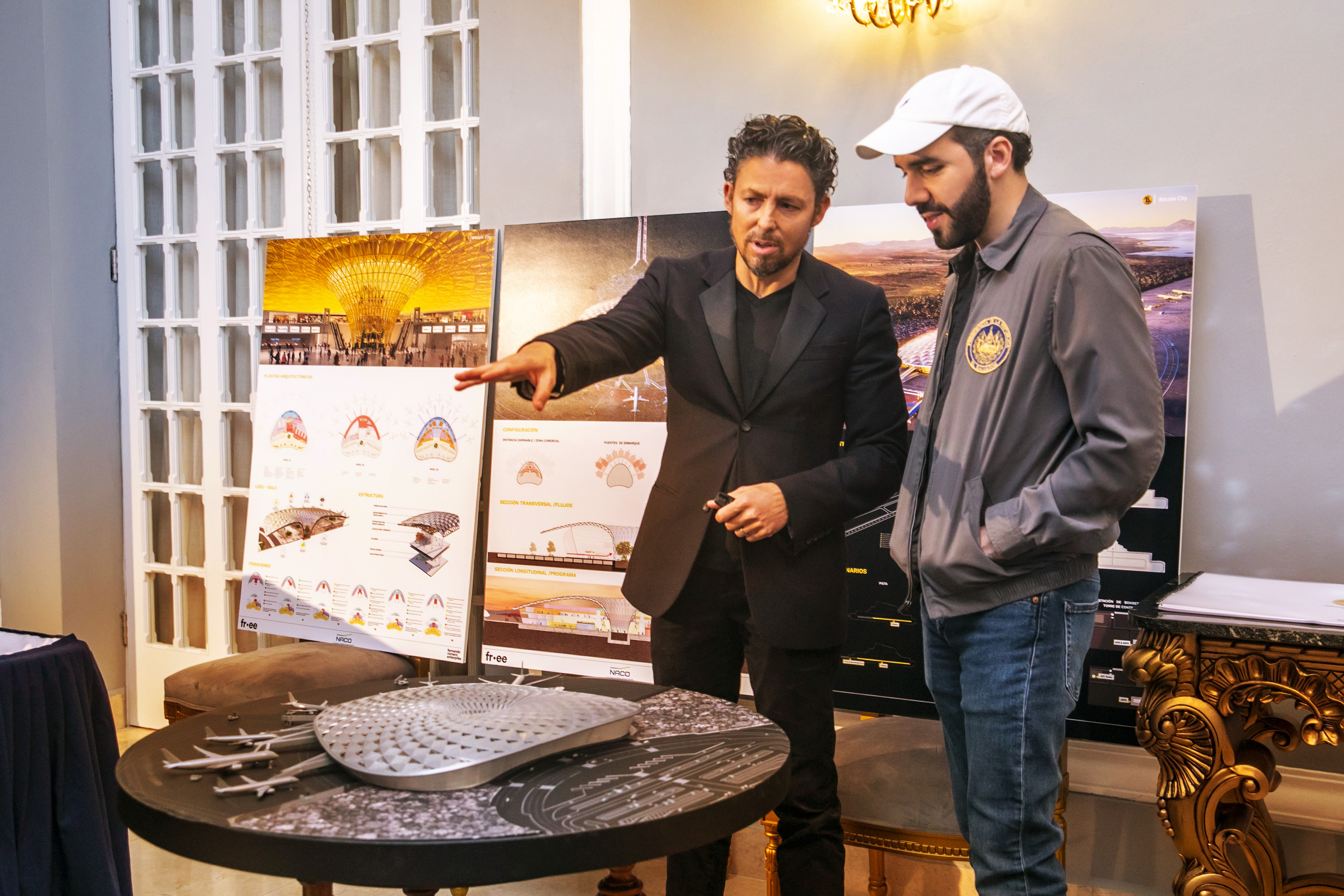
- Salvadoran President Nayib Bukele at right, and Mexican architect Fernando Romero viewing a model of the Bitcoin City airport in 2022

- Location in El Salvador
- Coordinates: 13°15′N 87°50′W
- Country: El Salvador
- Department: La Unión Department

Bitcoin City is a planned smart city project in La Unión, El Salvador. The planned city is intended to be a tax haven, and to use geothermal energy to power Bitcoin mining. The feasibility of its reliance on both geothermal energy and Bitcoin have been the subject of criticism, alongside concerns regarding delays in the project's financing and construction.

== Description ==
In November 2021, President of El Salvador Nayib Bukele announced that he planned to build Bitcoin City in the southeastern region of La Unión at the base of the Conchagua volcano, which would use geothermal energy to power bitcoin mining. The project has been criticized by ecologist Ricardo Navarro. “Geothermal still costs more than oil, otherwise we would already be using more of it. What will end up happening is that we will just be buying more oil," he told The Telegraph. The initiative is modelled after special economic zones (SEZ), and proponents of the plan cite Singapore, Dubai, and Shenzhen as successful examples. Some SEZ have benefitted the host nation's economy, others have not, and some have failed. Crypto-backed special economic zone projects in the Global South have been described by some commentators as reminiscent of colonialism. Past crypto utopia projects, such as Akon City, Cryptoland, and MS Satoshi, also failed to complete.

The planned city would be funded by a US$1 billion Bitcoin bond issued by state-owned power company LaGeo. Also known as "Volcano bonds", half of the income from the sales would fund the construction of Bitcoin City and the mining of cryptocurrencies. The other half would be invested in Bitcoins in the hope that they would rise in value. Most buyers are expected to be crypto investors, such as the chairman of Bitcoin Foundation Brock Pierce. Some may be granted Salvadoran citizenship depending on how much bond they purchase. The city is to be served by Bitcoin City Airport, designed by Mexican architect Fernando Romero. It is expected to begin operations in 2027.

Bukele has promised to make the city a tax haven, saying,

We will have no income tax, forever. No income tax, zero property tax, no procurement tax, zero city tax, and zero CO_{2} emissions ... The only taxes that they will have in Bitcoin City is VAT, half will be used to pay the municipality's bonds and the rest for the public infrastructure and maintenance of the city.

The project has faced various criticisms, ranging from concerns over delays in financing and construction, to skepticism that Salvadorans will willingly adopt Bitcoin, that investors will be able to recoup costs if El Salvador defaults, and that Bukele's government has made misleading statements regarding the project's progress.

== See also ==
- Akon City
- Cryptoland
- Cryptocurrencies in Puerto Rico
- Playa El Zonte, also known as "Bitcoin Beach"
