= Usulután (volcano) =

Mountain in El Salvador

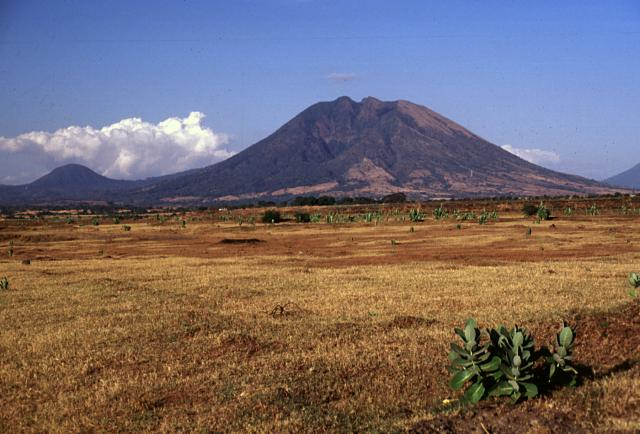
- Usulután volcano rises above the Pacific coastal plain.

Highest point
- Elevation: 1,449 m (4,754 ft)
- Coordinates: 13.419°N 88.471°W

Geography
- Location: Usulután Department, El Salvador

Geology
- Mountain type: Stratovolcano
- Volcanic arc: Central America Volcanic Arc
- Last eruption: Unknown

Usulután is a stratovolcano in central El Salvador, rising above the coastal plain between the San Vicente and San Miguel volcanoes, and just east of Taburete volcano. The volcano is topped by a 1.3 kilometres (0.8 mi) wide summit crater which is breached to the east.

== See also ==
- List of volcanoes in El Salvador
- List of stratovolcanoes
