= El Salvador–Guatemala relations =

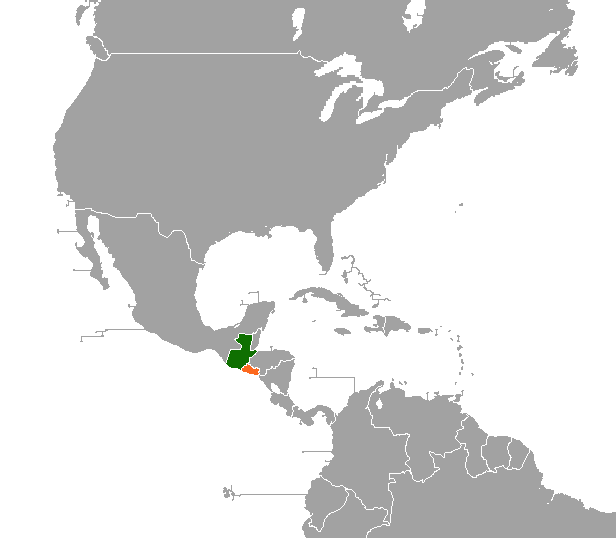

- Guatemala: El Salvador

El Salvador and Guatemala maintain bilateral relations. El Salvador has an embassy in Guatemala City. Guatemala has an embassy in San Salvador. Both countries are members of the Central American Integration System, Community of Latin American and Caribbean States, Organization of American States, and the Organization of Ibero-American States.

== Joint military operation ==
The Armed Forces of El Salvador, along with the Armed Forces of Guatemala deployed a joint 150 troop contingent in a peacekeeping mission to Port-au-Prince, Haiti, to enforce a United Nations-backed multinational security mission to restore order to Port-au-Prince amid an increase in gang violence in the Haitian crisis.

== See also ==
- El Salvador–Guatemala border
- Foreign relations of El Salvador
- Foreign relations of Guatemala
