= El Salvador–Guatemala border =

International border

Coordinates: 14.4222°N 89.3500°W

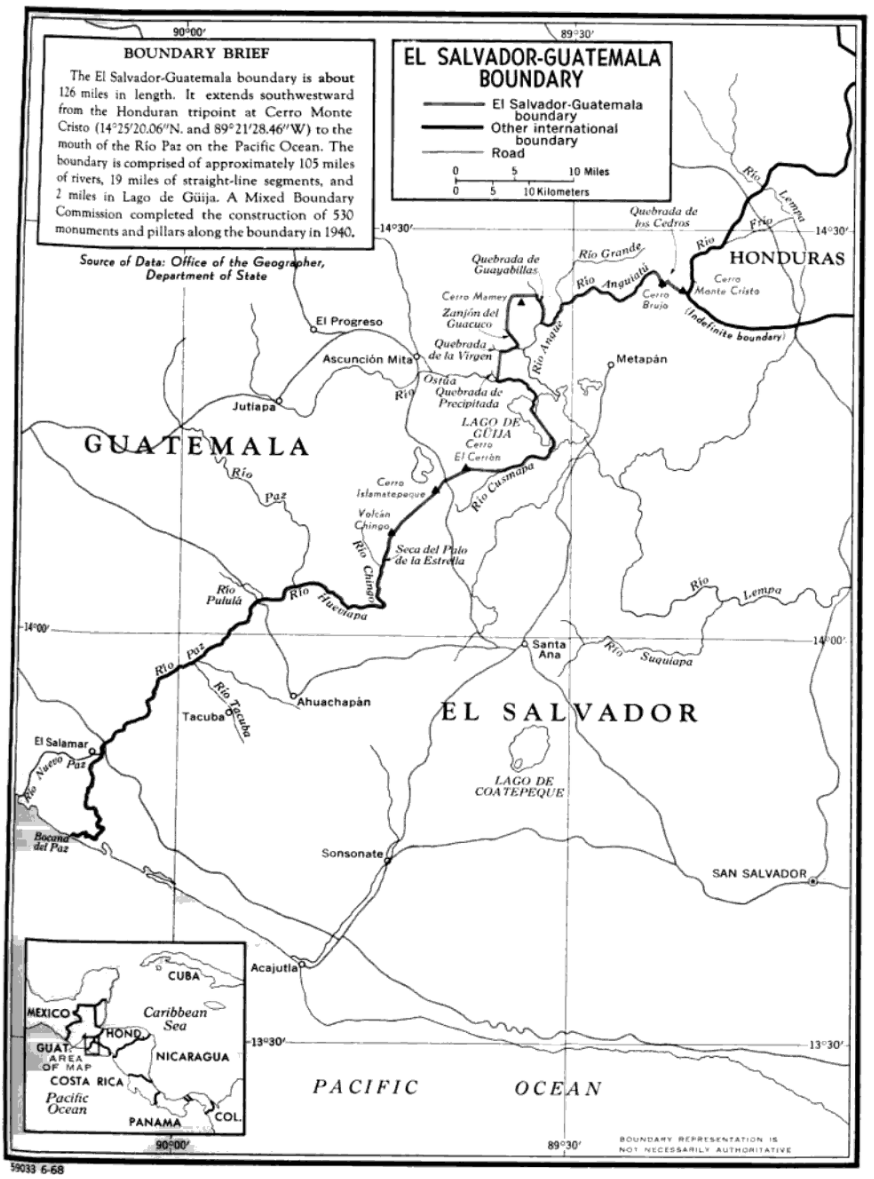
The border (1968 map)

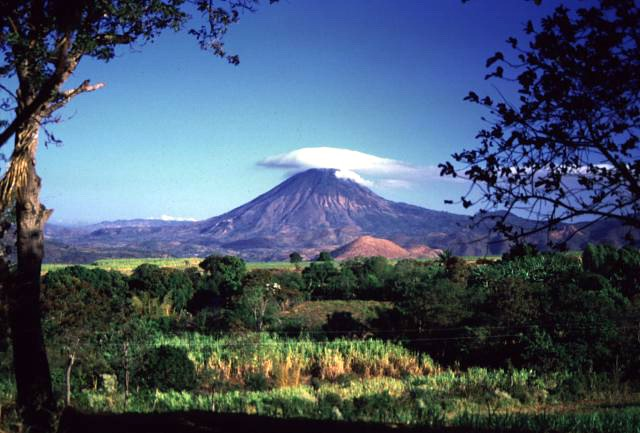
Chingo volcano lies on the border between El Salvador and Guatemala

The El Salvador–Guatemala border is a 203 km (126 mi) international boundary in the northeast–southwest direction, northwest of El Salvador, and separating the country from the territory of Guatemala. From north to south, it starts in the triple border of the two countries with Honduras, near the peak Monte Cristo in Volcanoes National Park, extending to the southwest by the Pacific Ocean coast, following the final stage the Rio Paz. It separates the department of Jutiapa in Guatemala from Ahuachapan (north) and Santa Ana departments in El Salvador. It runs along 105 mi (169 km) of rivers, 19 mi (31 km) of straight-line segments and 2 mi (3.2 km) in Lake Güija. 530 boundary pillars were erected in 1940.

== See also ==
- El Salvador–Guatemala relations
