= Cerro Cinotepeque =

Volcano in El Salvador

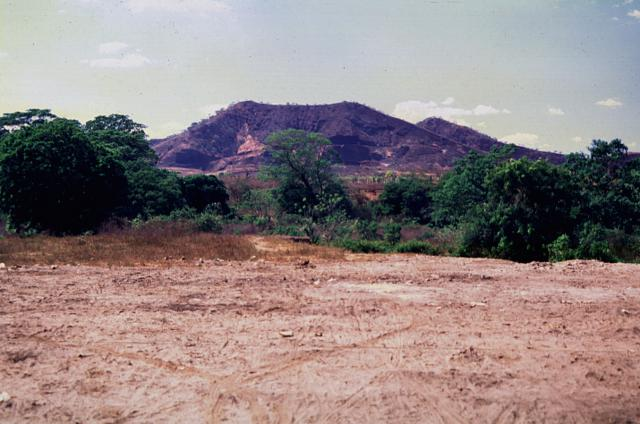

Highest point
- Elevation: 665 m (2,182 ft)
- Coordinates: 14°00′25″N 89°14′43″W

Geography
- Location: El Salvador

Geology
- Volcanic arc: Central America Volcanic Arc

Cerro Cinotepeque is a volcano in El Salvador. The volcano is one of a series of small volcanoes stretching to the north of Aguilares, El Salvador.

== See also ==
- List of volcanoes in El Salvador
