= Chinameca (volcano) =

Stratovolcano in central-eastern El Salvador

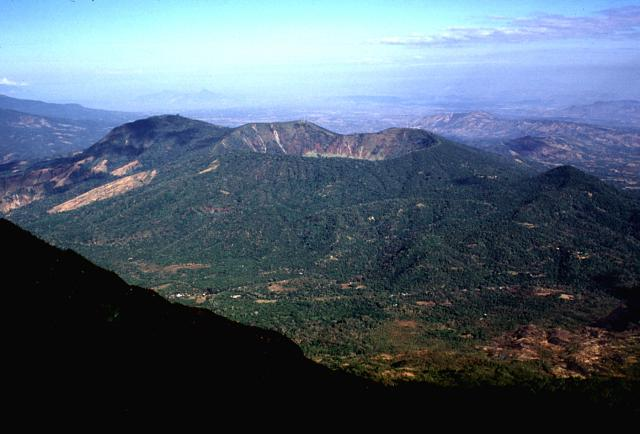
- Chinameca stratovolcano is seen here from the SE near the summit of neighboring San Miguel volcano.

Highest point
- Elevation: 1,300 m (4,300 ft)
- Coordinates: 13°28′41″N 88°19′48″W

Geography
- Location within El Salvador
- Location: San Miguel Department, El Salvador

Geology
- Mountain type: Stratovolcano
- Volcanic arc: Central America Volcanic Arc
- Last eruption: Unknown

Chinameca (also known as El Pacayal) is a stratovolcano in central-eastern El Salvador. It lies north of San Miguel volcano and rises over the town of Chinameca. The volcano is topped by a 2 kilometres (1.2 mi) wide caldera known as Laguna Seca el Pacayal, and a satellite cone on the west side, Cerro el Limbo, rises higher than the caldera rim. Fumaroles can be found on the north side, and it has been the site of a geothermal exploration program.

== See also ==
- List of volcanoes in El Salvador
