= Alfredo Escalera (baseball) =

Puerto Rican baseball player (born 1995)

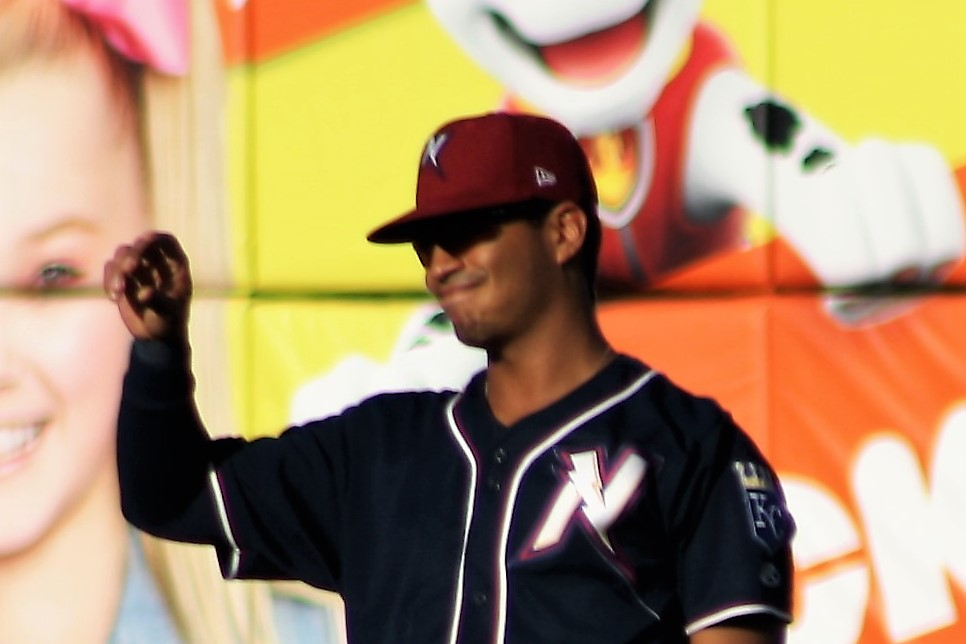
- Escalera with the Northwest Arkansas Naturals
- Outfielder
- Born: February 17, 1995 (age 31); Santurce, San Juan, Puerto Rico
- Bats: Right Throws: Right
- Stats at Baseball Reference

Alfredo Luis Escalera Maldonado (born February 17, 1995), also known as Alfredo Escalera and Alfredo Escalera–Maldonado, is a Puerto Rican former professional baseball outfielder. The Kansas City Royals drafted Escalera out of high school in the eighth round of the 2012 MLB draft, making him the youngest player to be drafted since the inception of the First-Year Players Draft in 1965.

Escalera was born in Santurce, San Juan, Puerto Rico, where his baseball abilities were noted at an early age, and later moved to Bradenton, Florida to enhance his training. Escalera debuted in his first professional game with the Arizona League Royals only two weeks after signing his multi-year contract.

== Early life ==
Background

Escalera was born in the Santurce section of the Puerto Rico Capital City, San Juan. When he was four years old, Escalera started playing baseball. In 2008 his parents moved to Florida to provide him with better development opportunities. His father, Alfredo L. Escalera, MD, an internal medicine physician, met his mother, Nancy, a New York nurse of Hispanic descent while undergoing his medical training in the Long Island College Hospital. The Escaleras moved to Puerto Rico where they established their residence as well as a considerable healthcare practice which included a medical group practice, a nursing home and a healthcare consulting firm. Escalera's younger sister Gabriela has become one of her brother's closest advisors and is closely involved in his professional career.

The Escalera family has a strong baseball tradition. Escalera's uncle Nino Escalera played for the Cincinnati Reds and his cousin Ruben Escalera for the Milwaukee Brewers. Both worked as scouts and professional team managers in their post-playing careers.

Exposure to Baseball

Escalera was exposed to baseball at the age of four when he joined the Encantada Baseball Club in Trujillo Alto, Puerto Rico. He later transferred to the Roosevelt Baseball Club in search of a more instructional environment. Between the ages 9 and 12, Escalera participated in the internationally regarded IMG Academy Baseball Camp in Bradenton, Florida. IMG's Program Director, Ken Bolek, later invited Escalera to join IMG as a full-time student-athlete. Escalera joined the IMG Academy in 2008.

== Amateur career ==
=== High school ===
During Escalera's high school career he participated in over two hundred IMG scrimmage and spring games as well as several workouts, showcases, and tournaments across the United States and Puerto Rico. Escalera mainly played for the IMG Royals but during the summer he joined the Puerto Rico Rookie Palomino Team (2010) and the Miami Bombers (2011).

At IMG, Escalera was honored with the 2011 IMG's Batting Champion Award after accumulating 25 RBI in 19 games with a batting average of .500. During his senior year, Escalera maintained a batting average of .377 with a flawless defense in a 25-game season. Escalera also had three walk off hits during his senior year ending the games in victory for his team, two of them while playing in the Sarasota Classic (Elite Division) and a walk off home run in the championship game.

Escalera's baseball talents drew a significant attention form several NCAA Division I colleges. While still in his junior year, Escalera verbally committed to attend Florida State University (FSU). Just prior to the National Letter of Intent signing day, Escalera, determined not to join the FSU Seminoles and instead signed a Letter of Intent to attend Stetson University's business school where he was expected to be the starting centerfielder for the Stetson's Hatters Baseball Team. Escalera's signing was met with enthusiasm by the Hatters team. "Alfredo is an extremely athletic student-athlete and has the ability to play any outfield or infield position. He has game-changing speed and a very good bat that projects to have some power at the Division I level. We are very excited to have Alfredo becoming a Hatter as he rounds out this already impressive class." stated Stetson's Baseball Head Coach Pete Dunn.

=== Player profile ===
The IMG Academy experience propelled Escalera's early talent into a solid professional player. According to the former MLB Coach and IMG Director, Ken Bolek, Escalera had a high degree of overall athleticism and action. Escalera also runs the 60 yard dash in 6.2 seconds, making him a valuable base runner. Escalera's skills were nationally ranked and evaluated by Perfect Game, Baseball Factory and Prospect Wire; he was considered to be one of the most consistent and reliable baseball players of the 2012 rookie crop.

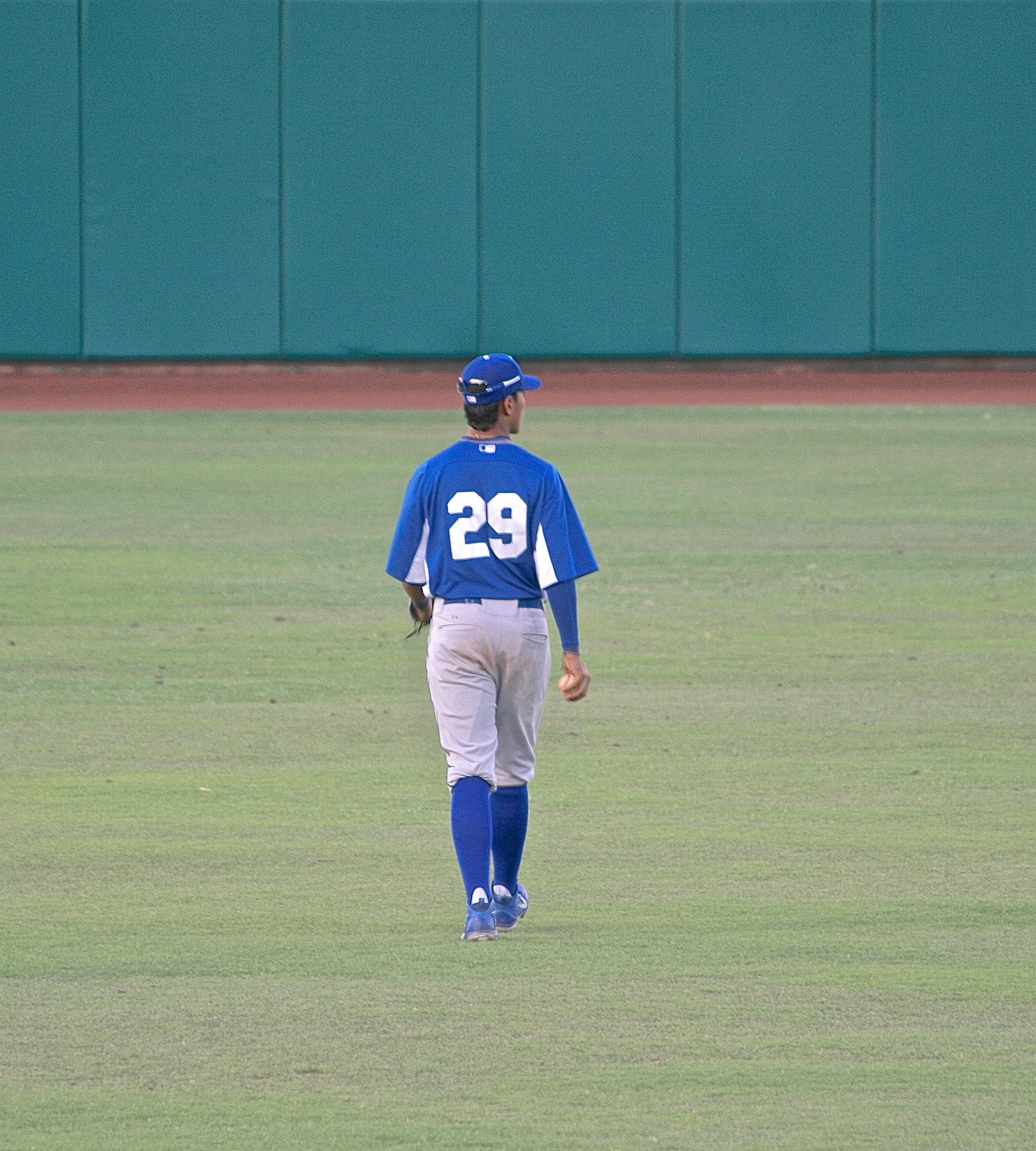
Escalera originally played as a third baseman but due to his speed, arm strength and ability to cover a lot of ground he was successfully switched to centerfield.

Offensively, Escalera can produce power. However, in addition to his offensive skills, the consensus is that on defense Escalera has quick feet and soft hands. His solid arm strength (91 MPH) supports his fielding skills. Perfect Game Scouting Report described Escalera as having a very smooth action, lots of arm strength, and accuracy that may lead to the third baseman position in the future but he has the tools to play any of the outfield positions.

=== Draft ===
During his high school senior year Escalera was scouted by eighteen Major League Baseball (MLB) organizations. He caught the attention of the professional southeast scouting staff who were regulars in Escalera's high school baseball games and workouts. "Escalera is one of the most interesting prospects to watch leading up to the draft" stated the sports expert Mack Ade.

Kansas City Royals scout Alex Mesa, comprehensively evaluated Escalera's performance prior to the 2012 draft and developed a close relation with Escalera and his family. Mesa lobbied the Royals’ management team and later got support from Paul Gibson and Lonnie Goldberg, National Cross-Checker and Director of Scouting respectively. The Royals consistent draft philosophy has been to get the best talent available on the board. Mesa successfully argued that Escalera's ability and work ethic fit that philosophy perfectly.

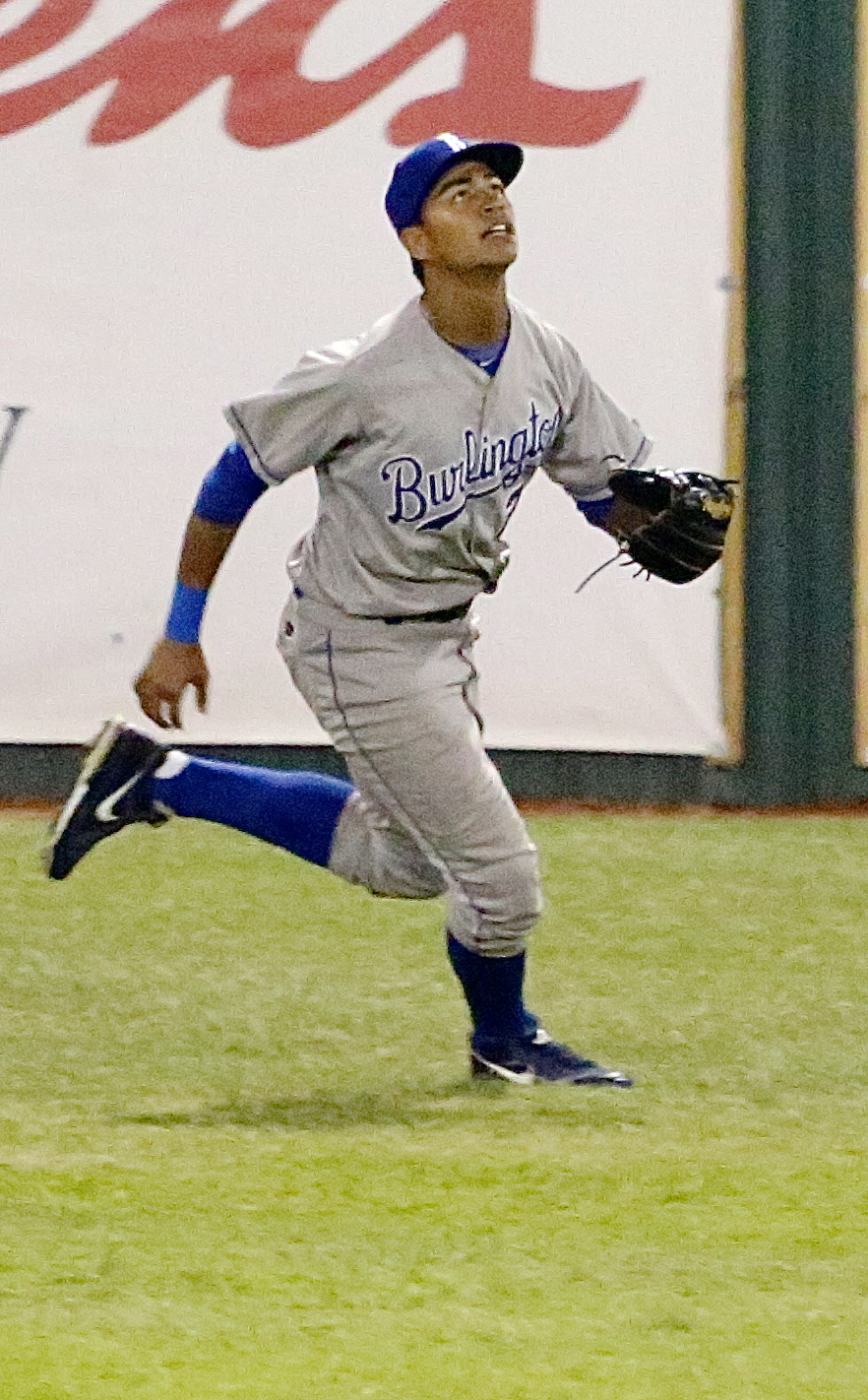
Escalera with the Burlington Royals

On draft day, Escalera was selected as the Kansas City Royals 8th pick, becoming the youngest player to be drafted since the inception of the draft in 1965.

== Professional career ==
=== Kansas City Royals ===
After negotiating the terms of his contract and signing an agreement, Escalera was sent to the AZL Royals in Surprise, Arizona.

After a month with the AZL Royals Escalera was able to adjust and contribute to his team's success. Escalera's participation in the AZL League has generated enthusiastic responses from his teammates, fans and coaches. "Combine Escalera's youth, glimpse of hitting talent, arm and speed and the Royals could have a true diamond in the rough" stated sports analyst Zach Mortimer.

Escalera was assigned by the Kansas City Royals to join the affiliate Burlington Royals in North Carolina during the 2013 baseball season after having a strong spring training showing. During the season, Escalera endured some minor challenges including a left thigh muscle strain. Despite this, Escalera ended his 2013 season as the Burlington Royals Team's leader in hits, doubles and batting average among the players in the team's final roster with more than 150 season's at bats. Escalera made the Top 20 2013 Appalachian League's batting average list.

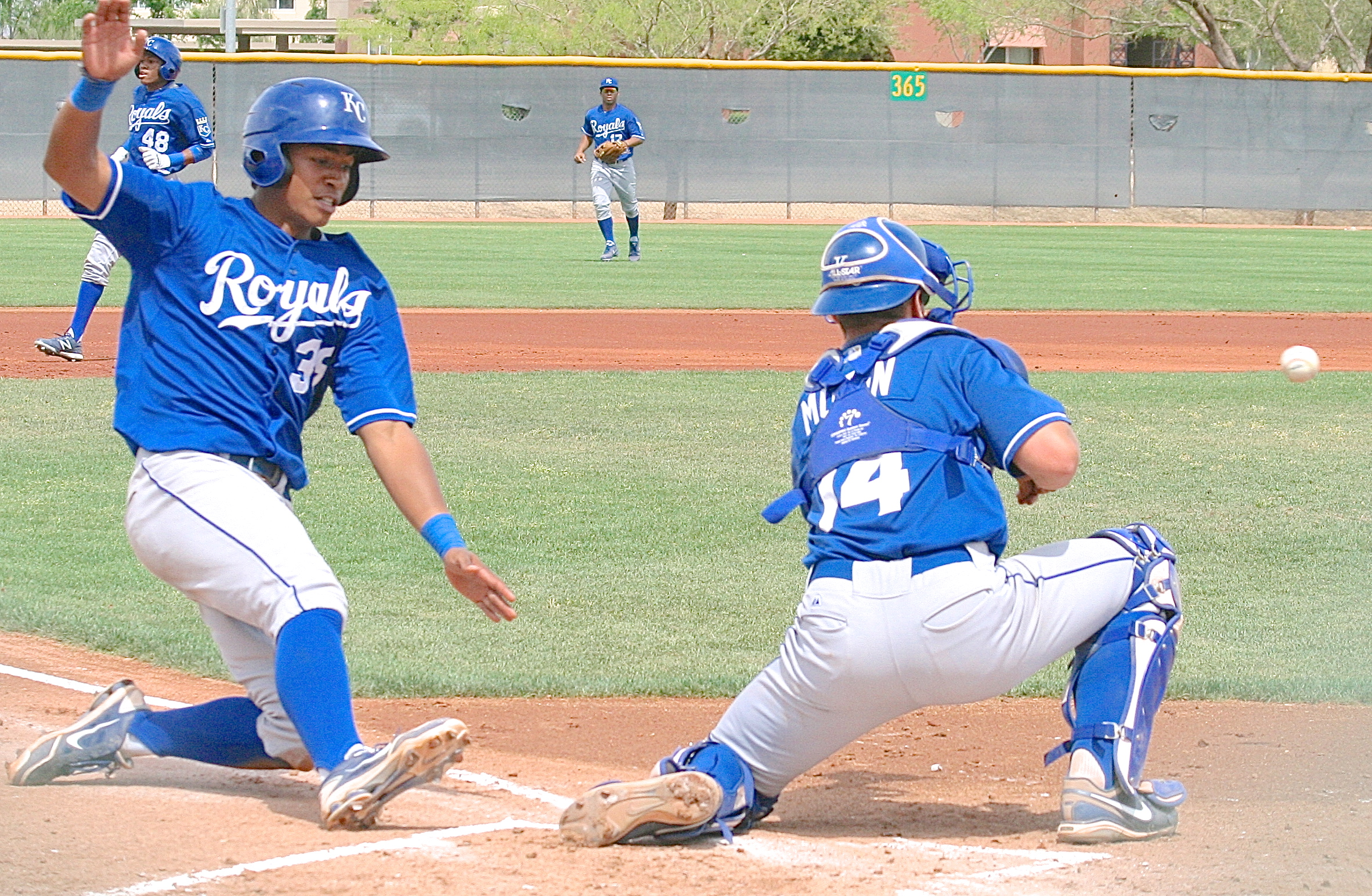
Escalera (left) during spring training with the Royals

After the 2014 Spring Training session, the Royals organization assigned Escalera to the Kansas City Royals affiliate Lexington Legends in Kentucky.

Escalera split the 2018 campaign between the AZL Royals and Double–A Northwest Arkansas Naturals. In 49 games for the two affiliates, he accumulated a .242/.313/.373 batting line with five home runs, 18 RBI, and nine stolen bases. Escalera elected free agency following the season on November 2, 2018.

=== New York Mets ===
On February 11, 2019, Escalera signed a minor league contract with the New York Mets. In 21 games split between the High–A St. Lucie Mets and Double–A Binghamton Rumble Ponies, he went 8–for–70 (.114) with two RBI and one stolen base. Escalera was released by the Mets organization on July 8.

== Business ownership ==
Escalera retired from baseball in 2020, entering the corporate world. Among his first acquisitions was web-based news service NotiCel.

== Philanthropic activities ==
Escalera has shown a commitment with participating and supporting altruistic events organized to improve the quality of live of the homeless population as well as underprivileged kids. During his recurrent outings to the Royals’ training camp in Surprise Arizona, Escalera has gotten involved in many humanitarian activities mostly related with assisting kids to get motivated to succeed in life. In October 2012, the Extra Innings Foundation awarded Escalera with the Player of the Month Award, for his continued support to the development of young children in the Arizona underprivileged communities. Later that year, Escalera headed an activity to raise funds for UNICEF's United States Fund to promote world access to clean water. He turned over a $25,000 check to the Puerto Rico Secretary of State Kenneth McClintock, in the presence of Secretary of State-designate David Bernier and Secretary-designate of Sports and Recreation Ramón Orta. In April 2013, during the National Volunteer Week, President Obama's Administration awarded Escalera with the President's Volunteer Service Award the nation's most distinguished service awards in the United States. During the 2014 Spring Training, the Royal's front office, teammates and coaches awarded Escalera the 2014 Mike Sweeney Award for exemplifying Royals' values on and off the field

== Recognition and awards ==
2011 Rawlings #1 Top Prospect
IMG's 2011 Spring Batting Champion
2012 Under Armour Pre-Season All American
2012 Perfect Game Pre-Season All American-High Honorable Mention
MVP 2012 Sarasota Classic
Maxprep's March 2012 Player of the Week
ESPN Top Florida Prospect List
MLBDraft.com Top 40 National Infielders.
Perfect Game 2012 Florida – All Region 2nd Team
Perfect Game's 2012 World Top Prospect List
World Showcase Top Infielder's List
World Showcase Top Outfielder's List
World Showcase Top 60-yard Times List
Extra Innings Foundation's Player of the Month-October 2012
2014 Mike Sweeney Award
