= San Miguel (volcano) =

Stratovolcano located in El Salvador

- Volcán Chaparrastique
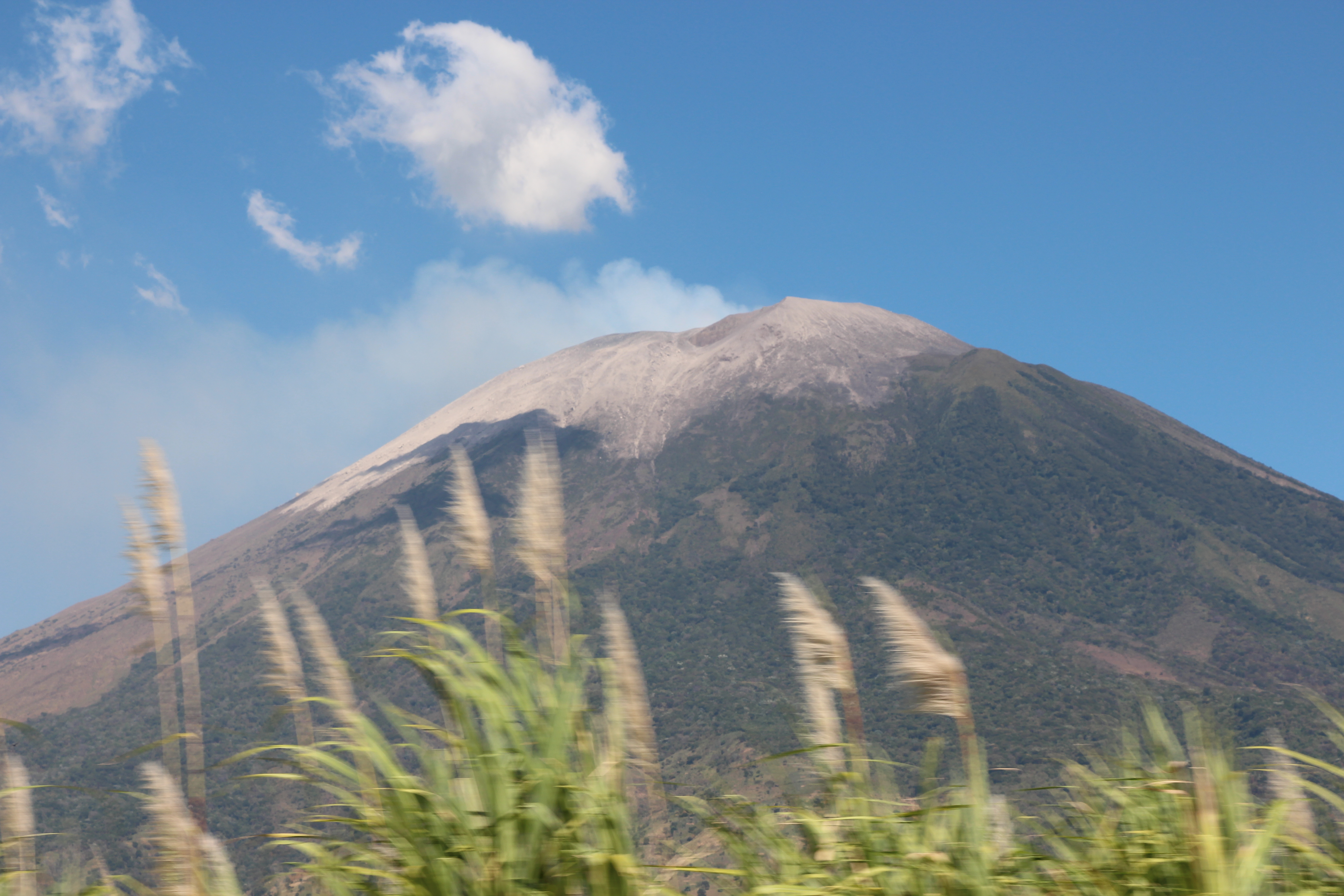
- Volcano in 2013

Highest point
- Elevation: 2,130 m (6,990 ft)
- Coordinates: 13°25′54″N 88°16′17″W

Geography
- Location within El Salvador
- Location: San Miguel Department, El Salvador

Geology
- Mountain type: Stratovolcano
- Volcanic arc: Central America Volcanic Arc
- Last eruption: 16 November 2022

San Miguel (also known as Volcán Chaparrastique) is a stratovolcano in central-eastern El Salvador, approximately 15 kilometres (9.3 mi) southwest of the city of San Miguel. On January 16, 2002, a minor eruption of steam, gas, and ash occurred from the summit crater, lasting 3 hours but causing no real damage to life or property. Carbon dioxide emissions had been monitored since November 2001, and their steady increase continued to build up until the eruption.

Twelve years later, on December 29, 2013, San Miguel erupted at 10:30 local time spewing ash and smoke into the sky, and prompted the evacuation of thousands of people living in a 3 km (1.9 mi) radius around the volcano. It was preceded and caused by increased seismic activity beginning at 06:30 local time.

== See also ==
- List of volcanoes in El Salvador
- List of stratovolcanoes

== Gallery ==
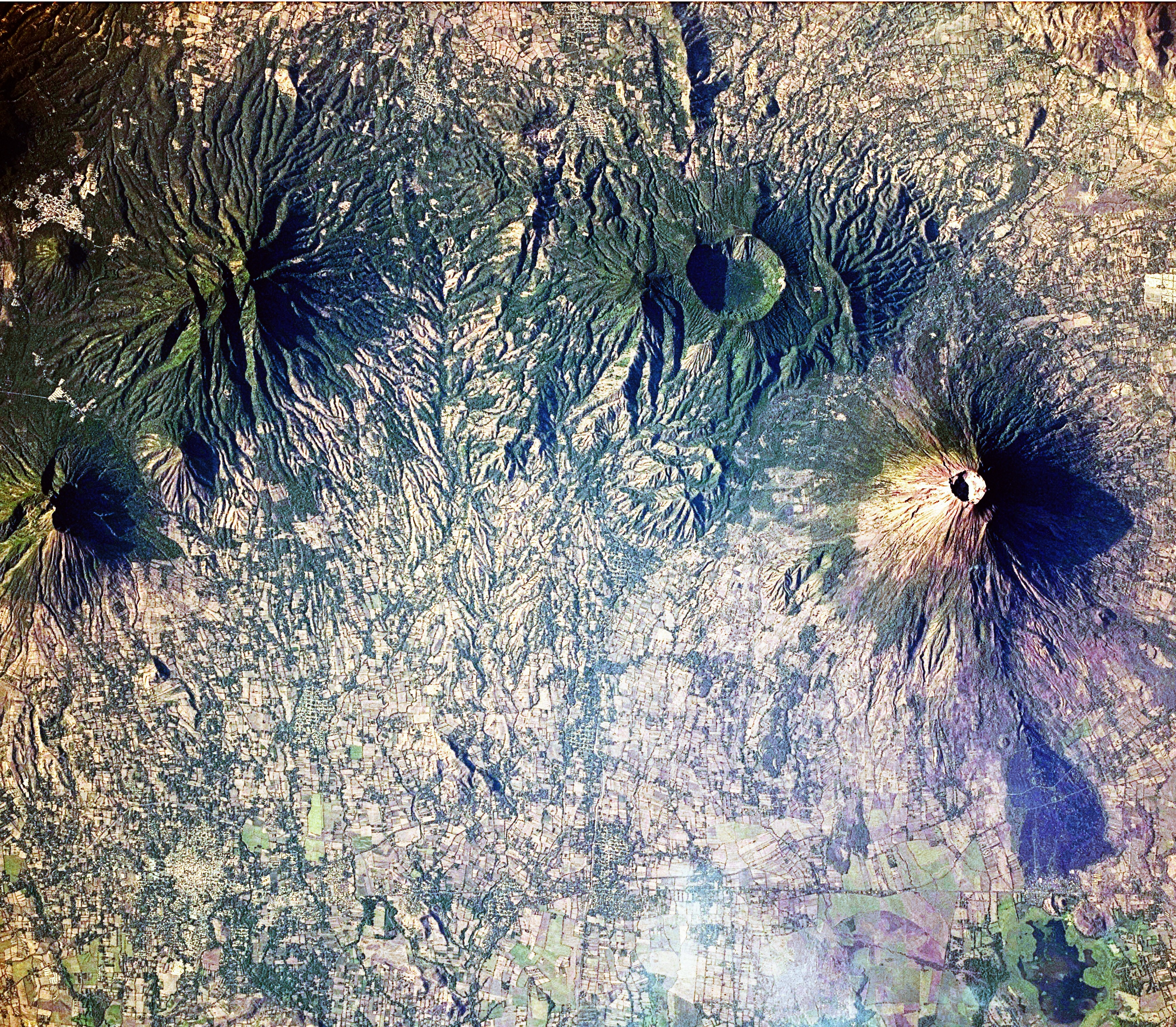
Usulután, El Tigre, Chinameca & San Miguel volcanoes imaged from space.

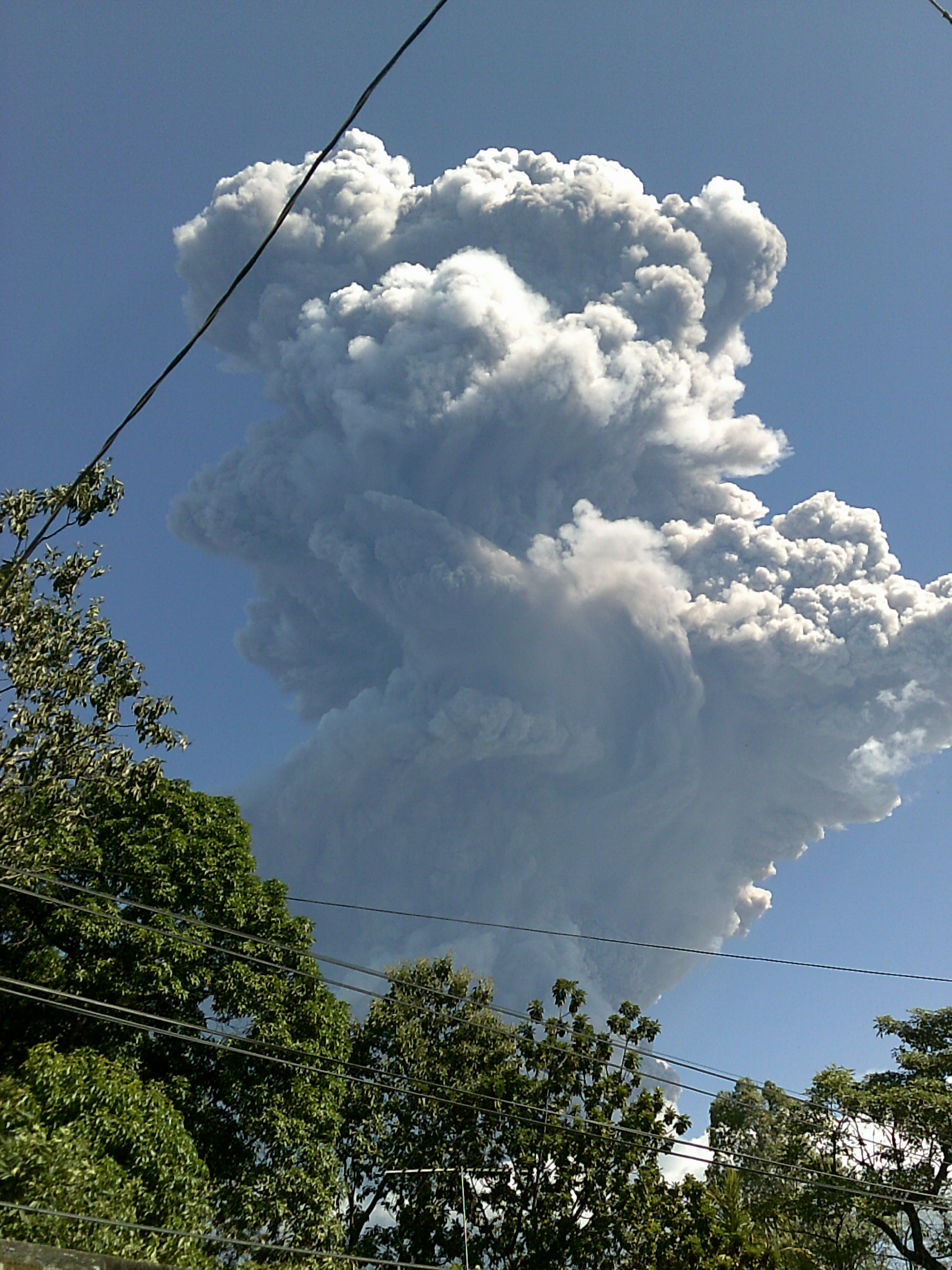
The eruption column on December 29, 2013
