= Chinameca, El Salvador =

Chinameca
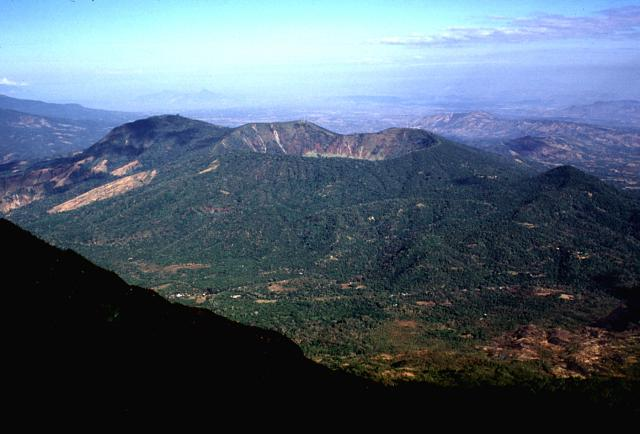
- Chinameca Volcano overlooking the town

- Location in El Salvador
- Coordinates: 13°30′N 88°21′W
- Country: El Salvador
- Department: San Miguel

Population (2024 census)
  - Total: 24,142

Chinameca is a municipality in the San Miguel Department of El Salvador. The Chinameca Volcano rises over the town.

== Sports ==
Chinameca is home to Salvadoran Third Division club C.D. Águila San Isidro, who play at the Hacienda San Isidro at 1,250 meters above sea level.
