= Akon City =

Planned community and city in Senegal

Akon City French: Ville d'Akon Wolof: Dëkku Akon
- Planned city
- Construction site of the Akon City Welcome Centre, December 2023

- Location within Senegal Location within Africa
- Coordinates: 14°16′26″N 16°53′24″W
- Country: Senegal
- Region: Thiès Region
- Department: M'bour Department
- Establishment: 2026 (planned first phase)
- Founder: Akon (creatively); Senegalese government (fiscally)
- Time zone: UTC+0 (GMT)

Akon City was a proposed planned community in the M'bour Department of Senegal conceived by Senegalese-American singer and entrepreneur Aliaune Damala Bouga Time Puru Nacka Lu Lu Lu Badara Akon Thiam, known professionally as Akon. The project was first announced in 2018. Akon cited the film Black Panther as an inspiration for the project and described Akon City as a "real-life Wakanda" which was to utilize modern technologies including blockchain and cryptocurrency.

Akon stated in October 2022 that construction of the city's first phase would begin in 2023 and be completed in 2028; however as of July 2025 the only structure which had been erected was the partially-completed welcome center. On July 4, 2025, the BBC reported that the project had been abandoned.

== History ==
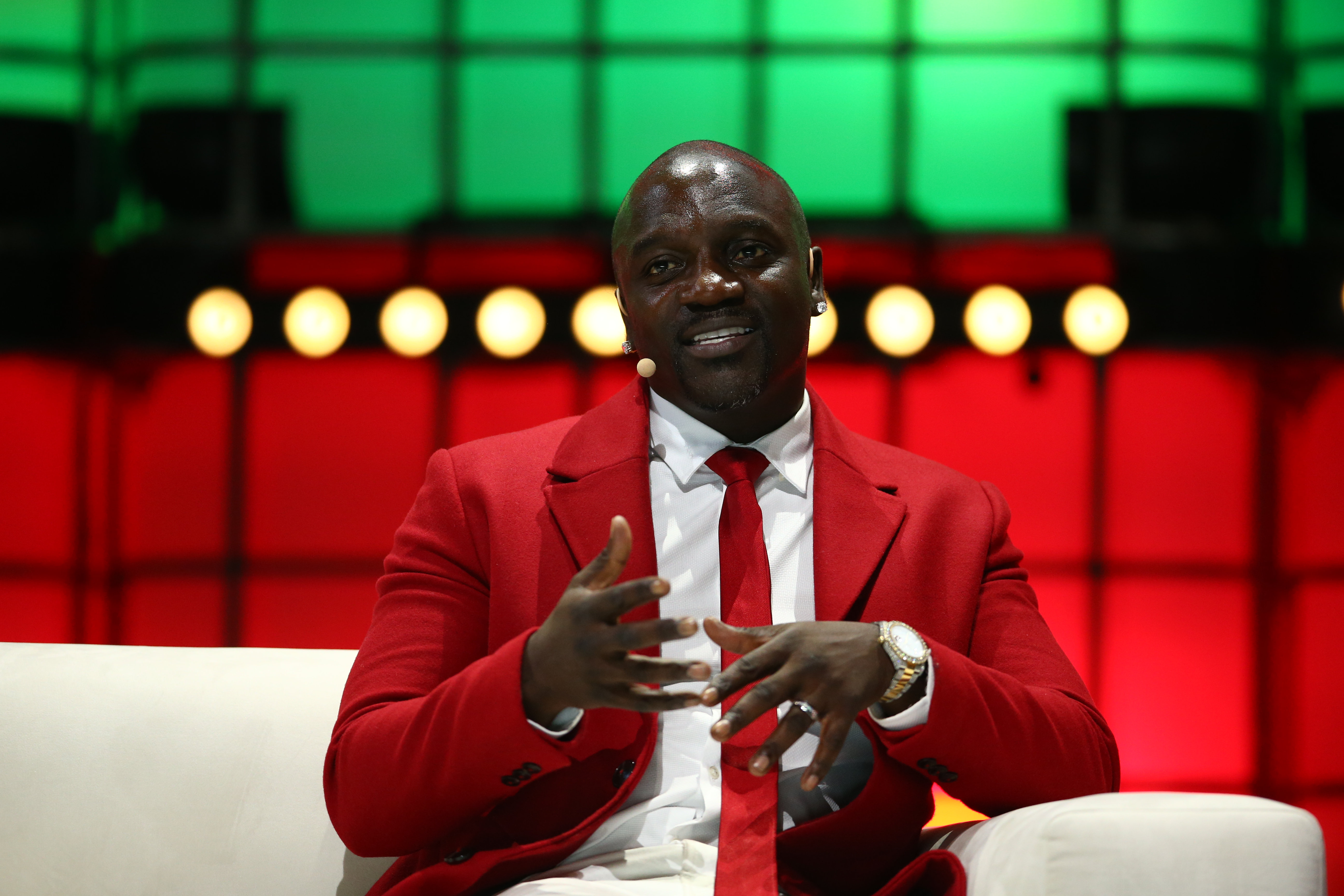
Akon discussing Akoin at WebSummit in Lisbon

=== Conception ===
Akon announced the launch of Akoin, a cryptocurrency, at the Cannes Lions International Festival of Creativity in 2018. On January 15, 2020, Akon announced plans for Akon City, a planned community for which Akoin was to serve as the central currency. In September 2020, Akon unveiled a rendering of a planned development for a futuristic city located along the Atlantic coast near the rural farming village of Mbodiène, 100 km (62 mi) south of Dakar. The project was planned with the support of Senegal's tourism development agency, SAPCO-Sénégal (La Société d'Aménagement et de Promotion des Côtes et Zones Touristiques du Sénégal). Akon raised a portion of the funding for Akon City by selling Tokens of Appreciation (TOA) in a campaign that ended in October 2019; each US$1 donated would be converted to up to four TOA, which would later be converted to Akoin. Akon reported that this campaign raised a total of $290,000 towards the project. By August 2020 Akon had reportedly secured around one-third of the estimated $6 billion needed to fund the project but declined to specify the source of the investments.

=== Economy ===
Akon envisioned Akoin to be the central currency of Akon City; however the Central Bank of West African States, which regulates and issues Senegal's official currency, the CFA franc, described the use of an alternative currency as illegal.

=== Proposed design ===
The planned city was to feature condominiums, offices, luxury high-rise apartment complexes, a university, a casino, an ocean resort, boating docks, recording studios, and a tech hub. Among the planned amenities were a 10,000 bed hospital, a hotel in which each room was to feature decorations inspired by one of the countries of Africa, and a zone dubbed "Senewood" envisioned as a site of development for the nation's film industry. Later renderings included fewer skyscrapers but retained a futuristic design. Akon cited traditional African sculpture as an inspiration for the curvaceous design of the city.

Akon City was designed by 10 Design, an architectural rendering company with headquarters in Asia. The project was proposed as a ten-year project with mixed-use development. Its stated primary goal was to stimulate the local economy and to create jobs for local workers. Akon also expressed hope that the city would attract diaspora tourists to Senegal. Akon envisioned Akon City as an eco-friendly smart city powered by renewable energy. It was an LEED-certified project.

Akon City was developed by Los Angeles–based KE International and Dubai-based Bakri & Associates Development Consultants. Hussein Bakri, the CEO of Bakri & Associates, was the lead architect.

As originally announced, Akon City was to consist of two phases of development:

Phase 1: Projected to be completed by 2023, this phase was to consist of roads, a hospital campus, a shopping mall, residential estates, hotels, a police station, a school, a waste facility, parks, and a photovoltaic solar power plant.

In an October 2022 interview with DJ Vlad, Akon predicted that Phase 1 would be completed by 2026.

Phase 2: Projected to be completed between 2024 and 2029.

=== Second proposed site ===
On April 6, 2021, a second project site in Uganda was announced by Akon alongside Dr. Chris Baryomunsi, the state minister for Housing and Urban Development, following discussions with Ugandan president Yoweri Museveni. This was to be constructed on one square mile of land allotted in the Mukono District in Mpuge sub-county. Akon discussed the entire 15-year development project and its proposed benefits to Ugandans in an interview on Uganda's NBS TV with Canary Mugume.

=== Delays and cancellation ===
As of December 2022, no construction work had taken place on the site aside from a foundation stone laid in a ceremony in 2020. In an interview with the BBC, both Akon and SAPCO affirmed that the project was still slated for completion, with Akon blaming the COVID-19 pandemic for delays in the project, stating that the projected timeline for the project had been pushed back by two years. As of February 2024, the project had barely begun construction, with only one building, the Welcome Center, being partially complete.

In August 2024, SAPCO issued Akon an ultimatum to initiate his project or return 90% of the land that had been granted to him. The ultimatum was issued by General Manager Serigne Mboup in response to Akon failing to fulfill several payments to SAPCO. By that time the value of the Akoin cryptocurrency had fallen from $0.15 at launch in 2020 to $0.003.

As of July 2025, the Akon City project had been officially shelved. On July 4, 2025, the BBC reported that Akon was working with authorities from SAPCO on new plans to develop the site.

== Controversy ==
Two years after the Token of Appreciation Funding campaign concluded, investors were given the opportunity to receive a refund in USD in lieu of the proposed Akoins; however as of December 2022 many investors reported that they had not yet been refunded.

The land on which Akon City was to be built was earmarked for future tourism developments in 2009. In August of 2024, some former landowners reported that they had yet to be compensated by SAPCO for use of the land.

The allocation of land in Uganda for a second city to be conceptualized by Akon has drawn controversy from some residents in Mpunge Sub-county, who report that they were not consulted about the reallocation of their land.

A lawsuit has been brought against Akon in the United States by a former business partner, DeVyne Stephens, for a debt of almost $4 million (USD) borrowed as part of the implementation of his futuristic city project. Akon's team has disputed Stephens' claims as "innuendo and speculation". In April 2022, part of the lawsuit was settled for $850,000.

== See also ==
- NEOM
- Bitcoin City
- Próspera
- Asgardia
- Fordlandia
- Telosa
- Epcot
