= Conchagüita =

Volcanic island in El Salvador

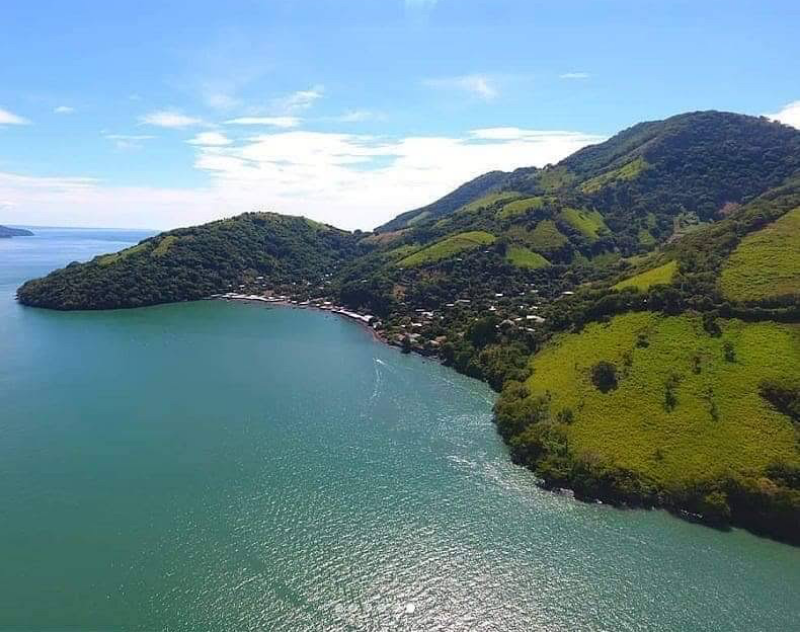

Highest point
- Elevation: 505 m (1,657 ft)
- Prominence: 505 m (1,657 ft)
- Coordinates: 13°13′44″N 87°46′01″W

Geography
- Location within El Salvador
- Location: El Salvador

Geology
- Mountain type: Stratovolcano
- Volcanic arc: Central America Volcanic Arc
- Last eruption: Pleistocene

Conchagüita is a volcanic island in the Gulf of Fonseca, eastern El Salvador.

In October 1892, an earthquake triggered a large landslide at the volcano, and the resulting dust cloud was first thought to be new volcanic ash. The event was discredited as volcanic eruption by the Smithsonian Institution.

== See also ==
- List of volcanoes in El Salvador
- List of stratovolcanoes
