= NotiCel =

Online Puerto Rican newspaper

NotiCel is an online newspaper that covers news related to Puerto Rico. The newspaper is owned by entrepreneur and former baseball player Alfredo Escalera with base operations located in San Juan. It was founded by Oscar Serrano and Omaya Sosa Pascual who also serve as Senior Content Director and Senior Managing Director, respectively. (Note: Morales (2013) "[...] said Oscar J. Serrano, editor and cofounder of online news site Noticel.com.")
