= Conchagua (volcano) =

Stratovolcanoes in eastern El Salvador

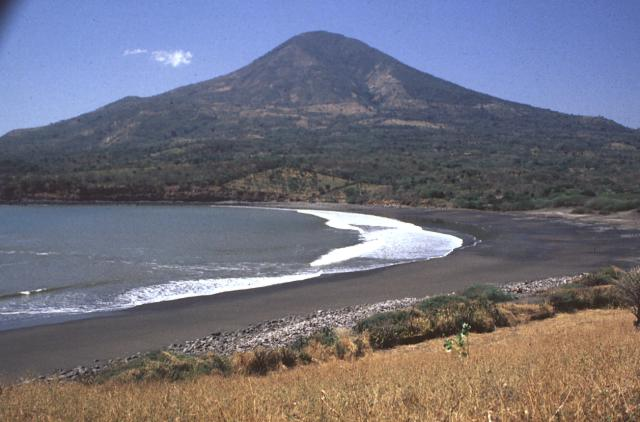
- Conchagua towers above sandy beaches along the Gulf of Fonseca at the SE tip of El Salvador.

Highest point
- Elevation: 1,225 m (4,019 ft)
- Coordinates: 13°16′30″N 87°50′42″W

Geography
- Location within El Salvador
- Location: La Unión Department, El Salvador

Geology
- Mountain type: Stratovolcano
- Volcanic arc: Central America Volcanic Arc
- Last eruption: Unknown

Conchagua (also known as Cochague) consists of two overlapping stratovolcanoes in a single conical edifice. It is located in southeastern El Salvador overlooking the Gulf of Fonseca. Cerro de La Banderas, at 1133 m, appears younger but is dated at 0.41 ± 0.1 Ma. To the west-southwest is the Cerro del Ocotal at 1225 m and dated at 0.15 ± 0.02 Ma. There are active fumarolic areas on both peaks but no recorded history of eruptions.

It is surrounded by forest called Bosque Conchagua. Conchagua, in Native American indigenous Salvadoran Lenca language, means (Flying Jaguar). According to historians, the volcano was settled by the Lenca civilization, who worshipped the goddess Comizahual, an indigenous Jaguar Princess. Lenca legends say that Conchagua was Comizahual's favorite volcano, and upon her death she was taken on top on Conchagua where her body turned into many golden Chiltota birds. At the summit is a retreat called El Espíritu de la Montaña, which means Mountain Spirit.

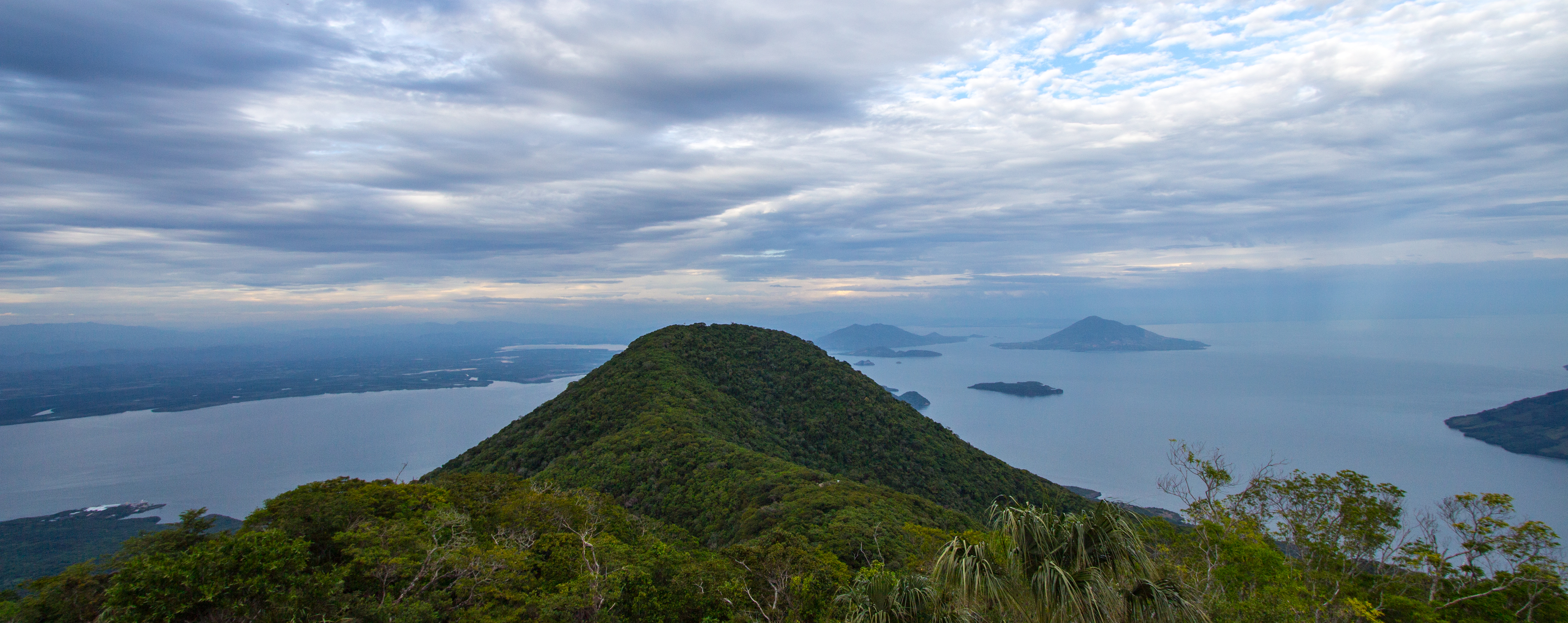
On top of Conchagua on a lookout called (Mirador Espiritu de la Montana), which overlooks the Gulf of Fonseca

== Plans for Bitcoin City ==
The volcano was selected as the site for the planned "Bitcoin City", a smart city project that will use the energy from the volcano to power its infrastructure, as well as the mining of cryptocurrencies. The project was announced by President Nayib Bukele in November 2021.

== See also ==
- List of volcanoes in El Salvador
- List of stratovolcanoes
