= Rasau Nupuri =

Mountain in Hokkaido, Japan

- ラサウヌプリ
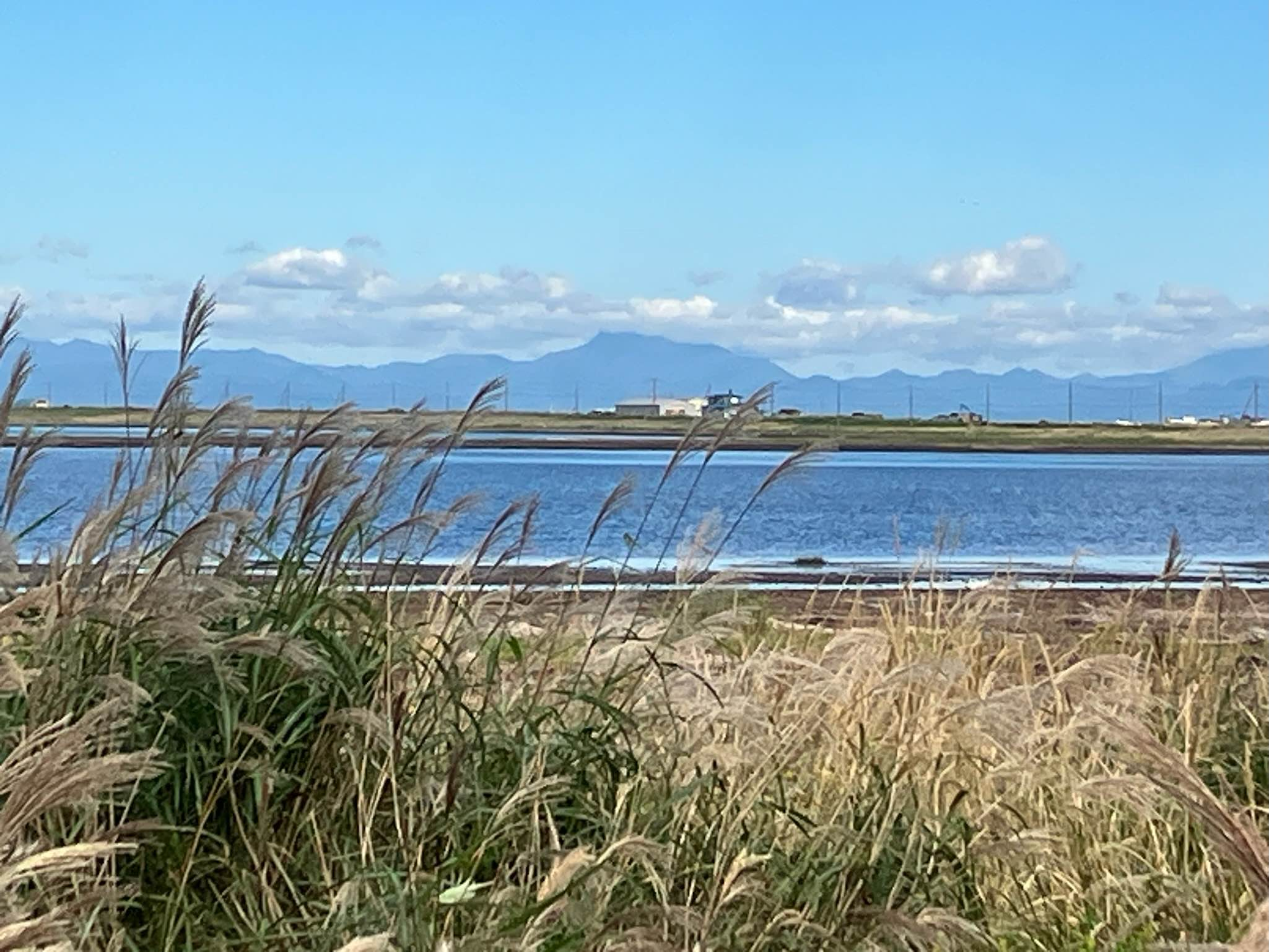

Highest point
- Elevation: 1,019.4 m (3,344 ft)
- Listing: Mountains and hills of Japan
- Coordinates: 43°55′37″N 144°58′23″E

Geography
- Location within Japan
- Location: Hokkaido, Japan
- Parent range: Shiretoko Peninsula

Rasau Nupuri (ラサウヌプリ) is a mountain in Shari and Rausu, Hokkaido, Japan. This mountain is located between Mount Unabetsu and Mount Onnebetsu in Shiretoko Peninsula. On the north side of the summit, there is a rock formation called "Rasau's Fang."
