= Villa Kujoyama =

Coordinates: 35.005°N 135.793°E

- ヴィラ九条山
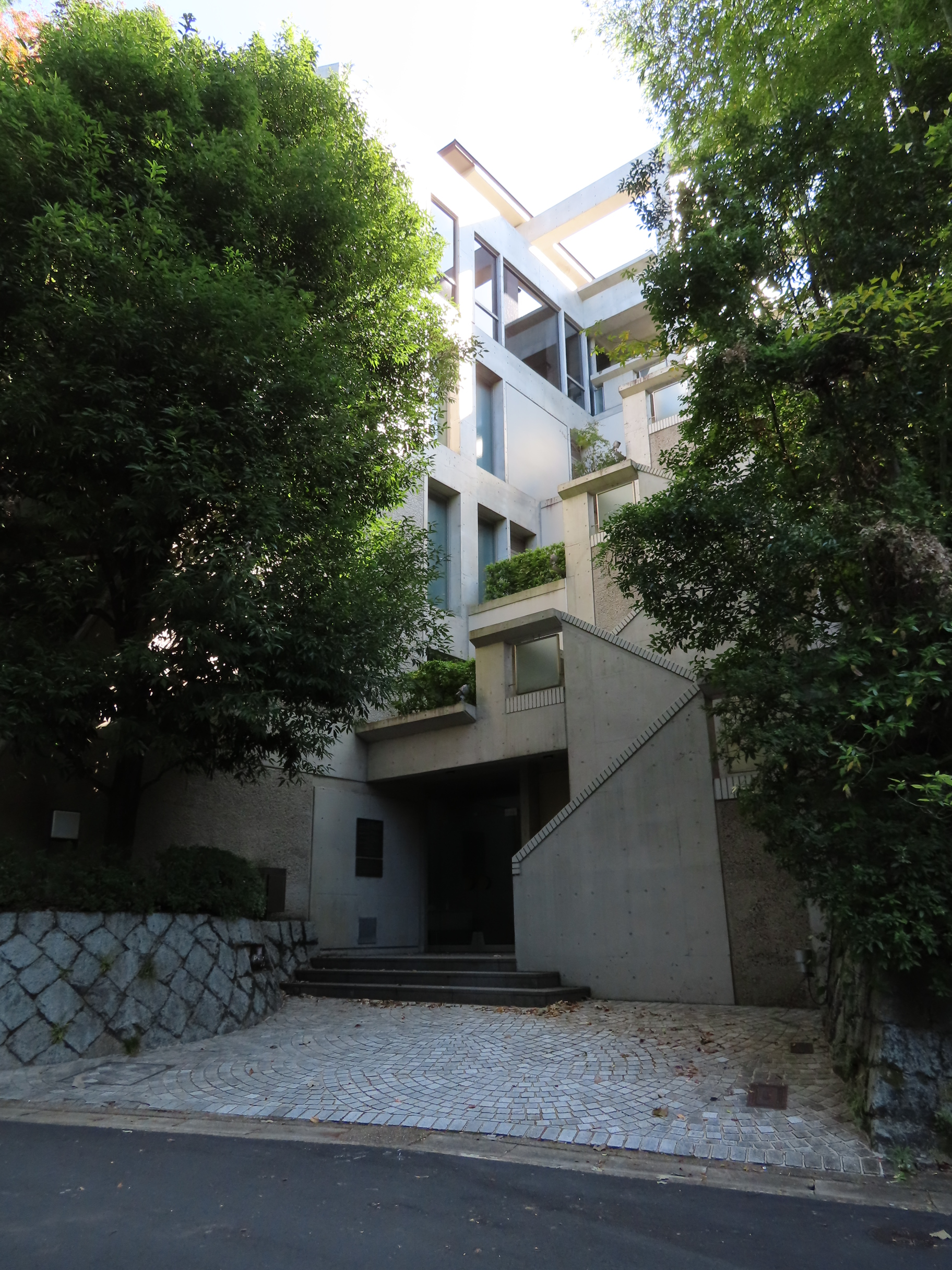

General information
- Location: 17-22 Hinooka, Ebisudani-cho, Yamashina-ku, Kyoto 607-8492, Kyoto, Japan
- Inaugurated: 1992

Design and construction
- Architect: Katô Kunio

Website
- https://www.villakujoyama.jp/

Villa Kujoyama is a multidisciplinary research and creative residency located on Mount Higashi in Kyoto. Built in 1992 by architect Katō Kunio (加藤 邦男), and initiated by the Société de rapprochement intellectuel franco-japonais, Villa Kujoyama is today one of the oldest and most prestigious French residency programs in Asia.

In 2022, Villa Kujoyama celebrated its 30th anniversary. Since its creation, it has welcomed more than 400 artists and creators from various disciplines, who have been able to develop a project related to Japan.

Villa Kujoyama is one of the five branches of the Institut français du Japon. It operates in coordination with the Institut français and has been supported by the Bettencourt Schueller Foundation since 2014.

== Villa Kujoyama today ==
=== Residency programs and the selection process ===
Through its activities, Villa Kujoyama invites the cultures of these two countries to dialogue by offering in-situ and outside-the-walls events, and translates on the art and culture level the proximities and bridges that exist between Japan and France. Connected with the French Institute, it offers artistic support, for up to 5 years after the residency. Post-residency programs allow artists to present their work in venues or extend their experience in Japan, with the support of partner venues of Villa Kujoyama.

Villa Kujoyama offers three distinct residential packages:

- Solo: a French or foreign candidate who has lived in France for at least 5 years presents a research project, for a residency of 4, 5 or 6 months.
- Binomial: two French or foreign candidates residing in France for at least 5 years present a joint research project, for a residency of 4 months.
- Duo: a French or foreign candidate residing in France for at least 5 years presents a joint research project with a Japanese candidate residing in Japan, for a residency of 4 months.

+ Duos or pairs Arts and Sciences (from 2025): one or one scientist in the field of natural sciences or formal sciences and a creator in the field of one of the artistic disciplines listed below teams up to present a joint project.

The 2024 Selection Process Application Rules list the following:

• Architecture / Landscape / Urbanism

• Street Arts / Circus / Puppetry

• Digital creation (digital arts, video game, VR)

• Fine Arts

• Comic book

• Cinema (Animation/Creative Documentary/Art video)

• Art critic and curator

• Dance / Performance

• Design / Graphic design

• Culinary Arts / Gastronomy

• Literature (fiction / essay / children’s literature / comics)

• Crafts

• Fashion

• Music (Classical / Contemporary / Jazz)

• Photography

• Theatre

Villa Kujoyama has six housing workshops, and welcomes about fifteen residents each year. A dedicated team on site accompanies them in their administrative and artistic procedures. It helps them to achieve their projects by putting them in contact with local operators with artistic, cultural, academic and economic backgrounds, and organizes partnerships for the diffusion of their work during and after the residency. The laureates stay at Villa Kujoyama receiving a residence allowance, without obligation of result.

=== Villa Kujoyama activities ===
Through its activities, Villa Kujoyama invites the cultures of these two countries to dialogue by offering in-situ and outside-the-walls events, and translates on the art and culture level the proximities and bridges that exist between Japan and France. Connected with the French Institute, it offers artistic support, for up to 5 years after the residency. Post-residency programs allow artists to present their work in venues or extend their experience in Japan, with the support of partner venues of Villa Kujoyama30.

==== In Japan ====
Villa Kujoyama is open to the public first Thursday of every month since March 2023, from 2pm to 9pm. This monthly opening allows artists in residence or formerly in residence to present their work and artworks to the public, amateur or professional, and to invite external speakers, to feed cultural exchanges.

The laureates of the Villa are invited each year to exhibit their work at the Nuit Blanche

KYOTO, a festival of contemporary creation organized by the French Institute of Kansai and the city of Kyoto. The works of the laureates are therefore presented not only at the Villa, but also in other partner places.

The various branches of the network of the French Institute of Japan also organize events that are an opportunity to diffuse the work of residents to a Francophile public through conferences, performances and exhibitions.

Residents are invited to take part in a wide variety of events outside the walls, through conferences, workshops, concerts, especially in schools and universities (Lycée français international de Kyoto, Kyoto University, Kanazawa College of Art).

==== In France ====
Villa Kujoyama has a multi-year partnerships system to deepen artistic productions after the residency in Japan. In Paris, the partnership with Musée de la Chasse et la Nature et la Maison de la Culture du Japon, offers artists the opportunity to show their works as part of their program31, 32. In Val-d'Oise, the contemporary art center of the Maubuisson Abbey allows artists to finalize their creations begun during their residency at the Villa, by providing them with a workshop and curatorial and/ or logistical accompaniment33.

==== Worldwide ====
In collaboration with Villa Albertine in the United States, the Académie de France à Rome - Villa Medici and Casa de Velázquez in Madrid, Villa Kujoyama participates in ¡Viva Villa!. Created in 2016 to allow the restitution of their works by the artists returning from residence, it takes place from 2023, from a call for projects intended to cultural institutions established on the French territory 34. The objective is to allow the restitution of the work done by the artists, creators and researchers from these four residencies of French artists located abroad through a format’s diversity.35.

== History ==
=== The creation of a Franco-Japanese Institute in Kyoto ===
Villa Kujoyama, constructed in 1992, is the result of an earlier project dating back to 1926 when Paul Claudel held the position of the French Ambassador to Japan.^{,} The original concept was to establish a cultural center in the Kansai region, and with the support of Katsutaro Inabata 稲畑勝太郎 (1862-1949), who was then the President of the Chamber of Commerce and Industry in Osaka, the project came to fruition. The Japanese industrialist managed to bring together a group of francophile Japanese and established the Society for Franco-Japanese Intellectual Exchange, which pooled the required funds for the construction of a cultural institution on Mount Higashi, at the present site of Villa Kujoyama.

The original project, designed to create a summer university offering ten weeks per year of French language and culture courses, transformed into the establishment of a year-round Franco-Japanese Institute dedicated to teaching French language and promoting awareness of French ideas.

The Franco-Japanese Intellectual Exchange Society ensured the supervision of this new Institute, constructed with Japanese funds, while the functioning and cultural programming were taken care of by the French government. The Franco-Japanese Institute was inaugurated on November 5, 1927, and led by geographer Francis Ruellan in its early years.

In 1936, the Franco-Japanese Institute was relocated near the Imperial University in the developing district of Izumidono. A new building was constructed, while the site built on Mount Higashi in 1926 remained abandoned for nearly fifty years.

=== From the Franco-Japanese Institute to Villa Kujoyama ===
The building deteriorated, leading to increasing protests from local residents in the 1970s. Consequently, the demolition of the site was decided in 1981, and the Franco-Japanese Intellectual Exchange Society gathered funds to cover the costs of the building's destruction. With the land cleared, its sale is then planned. However, following the announcement, the French government shows interest in this land overlooking Kyoto and disapproves of the intended sale.

The French and Japanese administrators of the Franco-Japanese Intellectual Exchange Society agree to cancel the sale and consider a new use for the site. In 1986, they decided to construct an artist' residence, primarily due to Kyoto's artistic and historical nature, and the site's exceptional location as a veritable "balcony overlooking the city." The decision to establish the "Franco-Japanese Center for Exchanges and Creation" was made on November 11, 1986.

In the aftermath, a period of three years ensued, during which funds were raised from prominent companies in the Kansai region. This endeavor was overseen by Inabata Katsuo (稲畑勝雄), the grandson of Katsutaro Inabata. Once the funding was gathered, an additional three years were required to secure the construction permit from the local municipality.

The architectural project was entrusted to the architect Katō Kunio, who was a professor at the University of Kyoto at the time. It took the shape of a thousand-square-meter edifice, capable of accommodating up to six artists simultaneously for creative residencies. Katō Kunio crafted his vision at the crossroads of French and Japanese cultures, choosing to blend both "rigor of modular composition and freedom in the arrangement of spaces" into the design.

The construction phase began in January 1991 and spanned 18 months, culminating in the opening of its doors to the inaugural residents in October 1992. An official inauguration ceremony was held on November 5, 1992. Today, this establishment is known as Villa Kujoyama.

Between 1992 and 2012, Villa Kujoyama hosted 275 French artists and creators for residency periods lasting up to twelve months. During this period, the establishment was jointly managed by the Institut français, which handled program coordination and funding of artists and creators' pensions, and the Ministry of Foreign Affairs, responsible for financing the facility's operations and supporting its artistic and cultural activities.

=== 2013–2014: a renovation period ===
Following over two decades of operation, Villa Kujoyama closed its doors for a two-year renovation period. Due to the aging condition of the building, there were discussions about discontinuing the program and shutting down the site.

The sustained operation of Villa Kujoyama is largely attributed to the active involvement of patrons. On the one hand, the Pierre Bergé - Yves Saint Laurent Foundation has played a vital role in supporting the renovation of the structure. The foundation contributed 500,000 € towards insulation, compliance upgrades, cleaning, and flooring works, essential for the successful refurbishment of the building. Thanks to this significant funding, the establishment was able to reopen its doors on January 1, 2014.

On the other hand, the Bettencourt Schueller Foundation also played a crucial role by committing to support Villa Kujoyama over three years, financing both its operations and artistic and cultural activities. The Foundation provided substantial support, amounting to 754,000 €, between 2014 and 2017. The Bettencourt Schueller Foundation renews its support as a patron of the residency program for the period 2022-2026.^{,}

== Villa Kujoyama today ==
The reopening of Villa Kujoyama provided an opportunity to redefine the establishment's missions and give a fresh perspective into the program.

More than 400 laureates have been in residence at Villa Kujoyama since its inception in 1992. They encompassed various disciplines ranging from contemporary artistic creation to research in humanities and social sciences.

=== Residency programs ===
Villa Kujoyama offers three distinct residency programs.

The first option (solo) allows a French or foreign candidate who has been residing in France for at least 5 years to present a research project for a residency of 4, 5, or 6 months. The second option (in pairs) offers a 4-month residency to two French or foreign candidates who have been residing in France for at least 5 years and allows them to work together on a joint project. The last option (in duo) is aimed at a French or foreign candidate who has been residing in France for at least 5 years and wishes to develop a collaborative project with a Japanese candidate residing in Japan, for a 4-month residency.

==== Liliane Bettencourt Prize for the Intelligence of the Hand ====
The Liliane Bettencourt Prize for the Intelligence of the Hand was created in 1999 by the Bettencourt Schueller Foundation to reward craftsmanship, creativity, and innovation in the field of arts and crafts.

As part of the partnership between Villa Kujoyama and the Bettencourt Schueller Foundation, two laureates of the Liliane Bettencourt Prize for the Intelligence of the Hand® are invited each year, starting from 2022, to stay at Villa Kujoyama for one month to develop a project related to their craftsmanship and Japanese culture. Nicolas Pinon (2022), Mona Oren (2022), Fanny Boucher (2023), and Grégoire Scalabre (2023) are the laureates of the Liliane Bettencourt Prize for the Intelligence of the Hand® who have resided at Villa Kujoyama.

The status of the laureates invited to stay at Villa Kujoyama is different from that of the laureates of other residency programs at the Villa. However, the selected laureates have the opportunity to apply for other solo, pair, or duo residency programs offered by the Institut français.

Through its activities, Villa Kujoyama facilitates dialogues between the cultures of Japan and France, highlighting the connection and relation that exist between them.

Since September 2022 and the arrival of the new director Adèle Fremolle, Villa Kujoyama opens its doors to the public every first Thursday of the month.

Villa Kujoyama offers artistic support, during and after the residency period, with the Institut français. The 5 years following the end of the residency, known as the post-residency period, allow artists to showcase their work in venues across France or to extend their experience in Japan with the support of Villa Kujoyama's partner institutions.

==== In Japan ====
The residents of Villa Kujoyama are annually invited to showcase their artistic achievements during the Nuit Blanche Kyoto, a festival of contemporary creation co-organized by the Institut français fu Kansai and the city of Kyoto. This event provides a platform for the residents to exhibit their works not only within the premises of Villa Kujoyama but also in various other partner locations, enhancing their visibility and cultural exchange opportunities.

==== In France ====
The Villa Kujoyama has established long-term partnerships that allow artists to further develop and enhance their artistic creations after their residency in Japan. In Paris, through collaborations with the Musée de la Chasse et la Nature and the Japanese cultural House in Paris (French: Maison de la culture du Japon à Paris), artists get the opportunity to showcase their works as part of these institutions' programming.^{,} Additionally, in the Val-d'Oise region, the contemporary art center of the Abbaye de Maubuisson offers artists a dedicated workspace and provides curatorial and logistical support, enabling them to complete the projects initiated during their stay at Villa Kujoyama.

==== Internationally ====
In partnership with Villa Albertine in the United States, the Académie de France à Rome - Villa Médicis and the Casa de Velázquez in Madrid, Villa Kujoyama takes part to ¡Viva Villa!, a festival launched in 2016. In 2023, the festival turns into a call for project applications towards cultural institutions that allows artists, researchers and creators from these 4 French residencies to showcase their works in cultural institutions located on the French territory in a variety of formats.^{,}

=== New disciplines added ===
The disciplines involved are:

- Architecture/landscaping/urbanism
- Art criticism and curating
- Cinema
- Comics
- Crafts
- Dance / performance
- Design / graphic design
- Digital creation
- Fashion
- Gastronomy
- Literature
- Music
- Photography
- Street arts/circus/puppetry
- Theater
- Visual arts

Since 2014, Villa Kujoyama has expanded its range of hosted disciplines to include digital arts and crafts. This expansion was prompted by the desire of the Bettencourt Schueller Foundation to showcase creators and artisans on a global scale, while also ensuring the preservation and transmission of the expertise of craftsmanship in both countries.

The scope of disciplines broadened in 2019 to encompass street arts / circus / puppetry, video games and curating.

=== Reaffirmed missions ===
Since its establishment, Villa Kujoyama has served as a platform for cultural exchanges. As a unique space solely devoted to contemporary creation and crafts, it serves as an instrument of influence and dissemination of French excellence and know-how.

The inclusion of crafts in the program in Kyoto, a city known for its rich artisanal heritage spanning centuries, holds great significance and relevance for both French and Japanese participants. This aspect not only encourages more interactions between artists from both countries but also establishes a meaningful connection with the local community. The goal is to anchor the program in the Kyoto region and facilitate exchanges in a city that has mastered the art of combining traditional practices with contemporary activities.

== Bettencourt Schueller Foundation ==
Starting in 2014, the Bettencourt Schueller Foundation has played a vital role as the primary patron of Villa Kujoyama. As a recognized family foundation with a public interest focus since its establishment, the foundation is committed to "giving wings to talent" to contribute to the success and influence of France. In line with this vision, the foundation actively seeks, selects, supports, accompanies, and showcases individuals who are shaping the world of tomorrow in three key areas: life sciences, arts, and solidarity.

Since its establishment in 1987, the foundation has honored 634 laureates and provided support for more than 1000 projects, led by diverse teams, associations, institutions, and organizations.

== Direction ==
=== From 1992 to 2012 ===
Between 1992 and 2012, the direction of Villa Kujoyama was handled by the director of the Institut français du Japon — Kansai.

- 1986-1994: Michel Wasserman
- 1994-1998: Claude Hudelot
- 1998-2000: Jerome Delormas
- 2000-2002: Jean-Claude Duthion
- 2002-2006: Pierre Fournier
- 2006–2010: Jean-Paul Olivier
- 2010–2013: Philippe Janvier-Kamiyama

=== From 2014 to today ===
Villa Kujoyama is one of the five establishments of the Institut français du Japon since 2014. It operates independently with its own management and direction, much like the four other Instituts français (Tokyo, Kyoto, Fukuoka, Yokohama), the four Alliances françaises (Sapporo, Sendai, Aichi, Tokushima), and the Research Institute of the French cultural network in Japan.

Since its reopening, the directors are as follow:

- 2014-2017: Christian Merlhiot and Sumiko Oé-Gottini
- 2017-2022: Charlotte Fouchet-Ishii
- Since September 2022: Adèle Fremolle
