= Rausu =

Rausu can refer to:

- Mount Rausu, volcano in Hokkaidō, Japan
- Rausu, Hokkaidō, town in the same prefecture
