= Mount Rausu =

Stratovolcano on the island of Hokkaido, Japan

- 羅臼岳
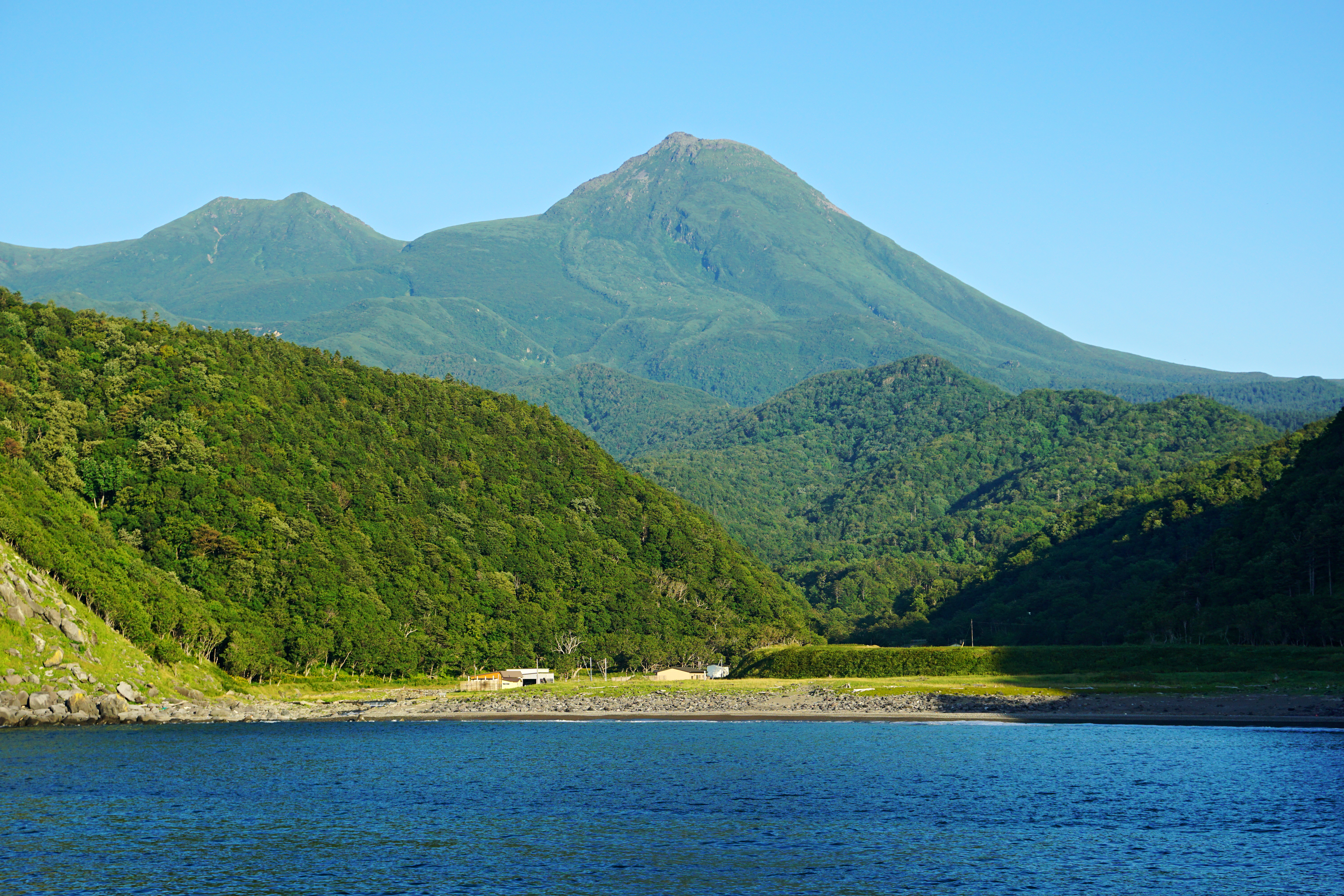
- View from Sea of Okhotsk (August 2014)

Highest point
- Elevation: 1,660.4 m (5,448 ft)
- Prominence: 1,348 m (4,423 ft)
- Listing: List of mountains in Japan; List of volcanoes in Japan; 100 Famous Japanese Mountains; Ribu
- Coordinates: 44°4′33″N 145°7′21″E

Geography
- Location within Hokkaido Location within Japan
- Location: Nemuro Subprefecture, Hokkaidō, Japan
- Parent range: Shiretoko Peninsula
- Topo map(s): Geospatial Information Authority 25000:1 羅臼; 25000:1 知床峠; 50000:1 羅臼

Geology
- Rock age: Holocene
- Mountain type: Stratovolcano
- Volcanic arc: Kuril arc
- Last eruption: 1800 ± 50 years

Climbing
- Easiest route: Scramble

Mount Rausu (羅臼岳, Rausu-dake) is a stratovolcano on the Shiretoko Peninsula in Hokkaidō, Japan. It sits on the border between the towns of Shari and Rausu. Mount Rausu is the northeasternmost Holocene volcano on Hokkaidō. It is one of the 100 famous mountains in Japan.

Mount Rausu's opening festival is held annually on July 3. This day officially opens the climbing season.

In the past 2,200 years Mount Rausu is believed to have erupted thrice, with a Plinian Eruption roughly 1,400 years ago and a pyroclastic flow about 500 years ago.

== History ==
On June 1, 1964, the region around Mount Rausu was declared a protected area called the Shiretoko National Park In July 2005, Shiretoko was registered as a Natural World Heritage Site by UNESCO.

== Gallery ==
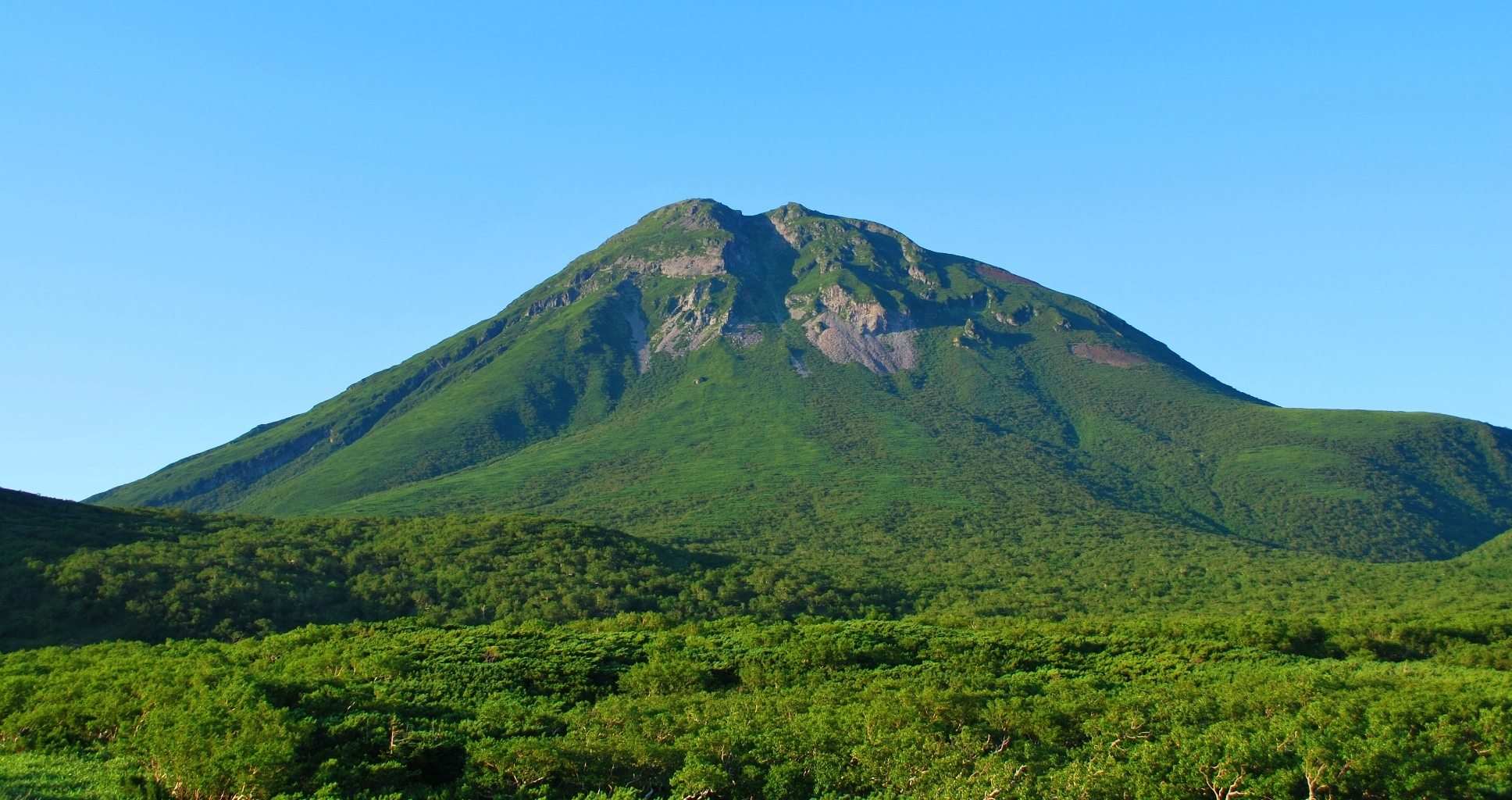
Viewed from the SSW.

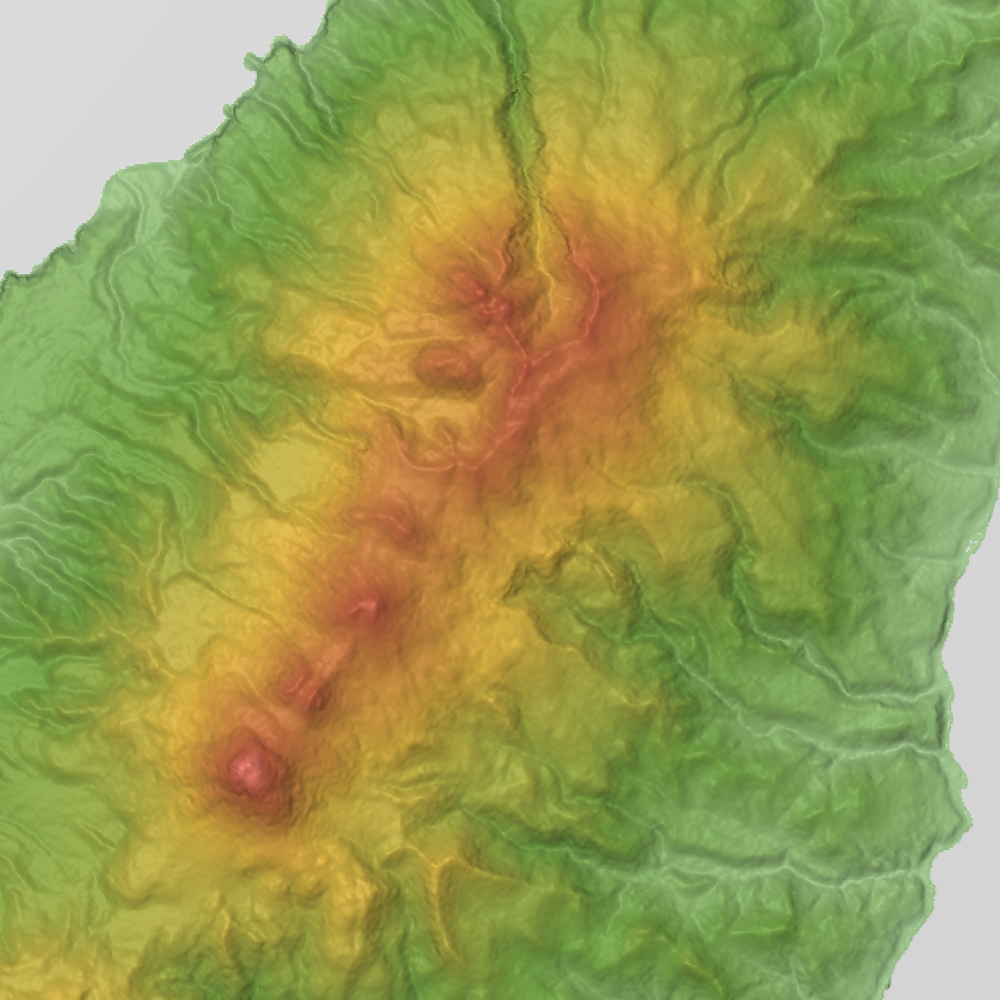
Rausu-Shiretoko Io Volcano Group. Rausu (lower left)

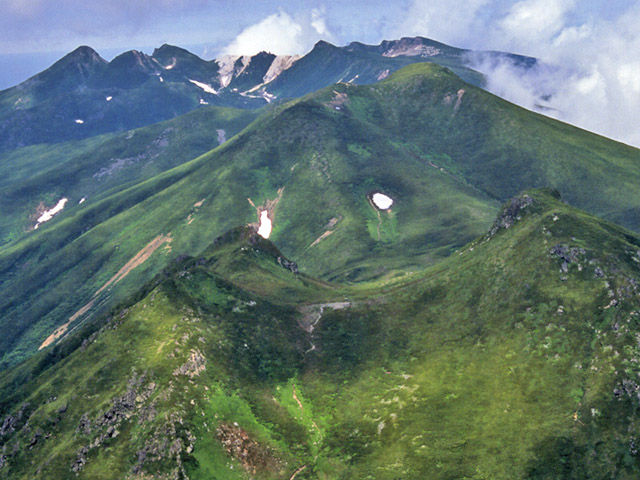
The mountains of the Shiretoko Peninsula from Mount Rausu (July 2007). In the foreground is Mitsumine, in the middle field is Mount Sashirui, and in the background is Mount Iō

== See also ==
- World Heritage Site
- Shiretoko National Park
- List of mountains in Japan
- 100 Famous Japanese Mountains
