= Mount Unabetsu =

Quaternary stratovolcano on the island of Hokkaido

- 海別岳
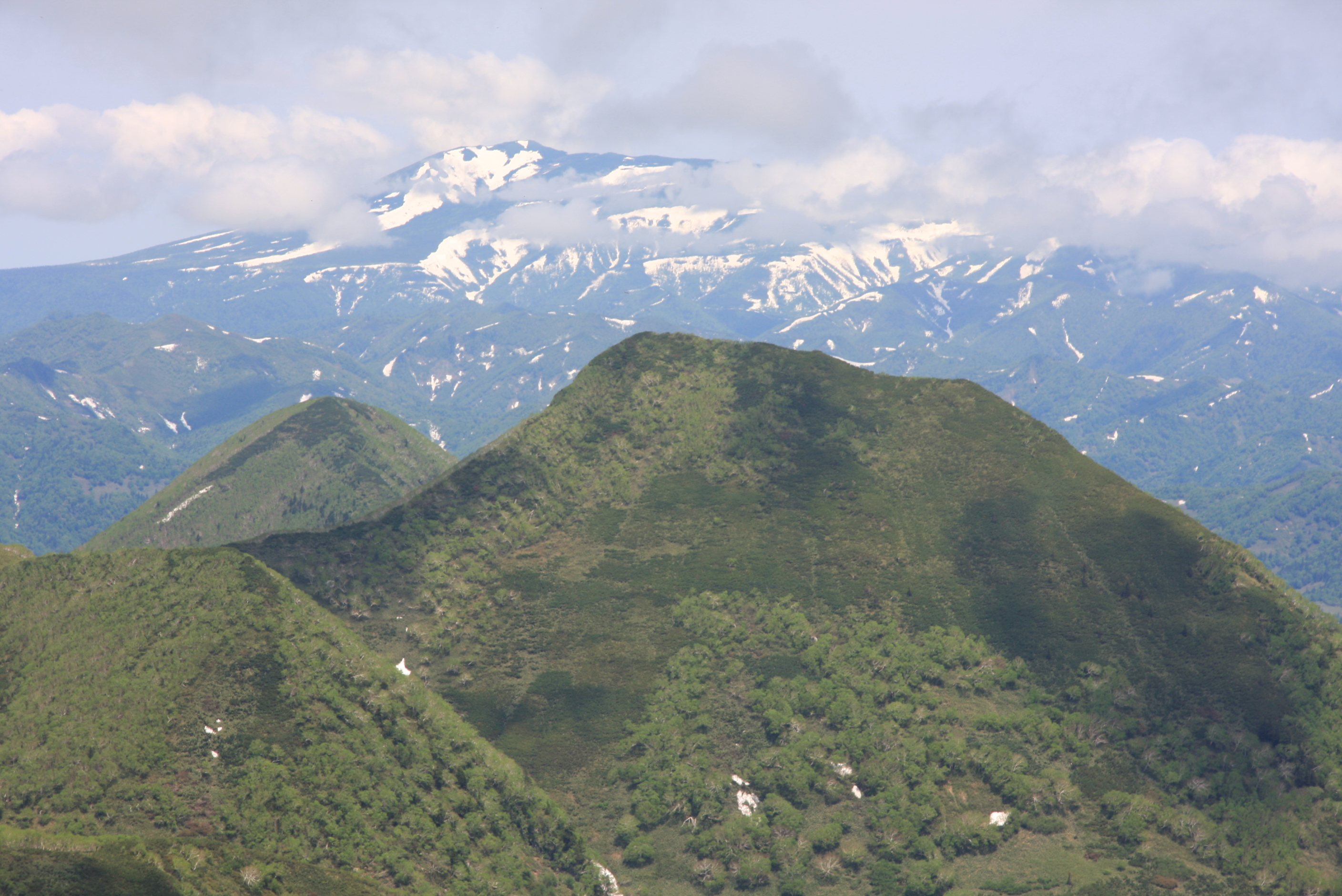
- Mount Unabetsu.

Highest point
- Elevation: 1,419.3 m (4,656 ft)
- Prominence: 910
- Parent peak: Mount Rausu
- Listing: List of mountains and hills of Japan by height
- Coordinates: 43°52′25″N 144°51′56″E

Naming
- Pronunciation: Japanese: [unabetsudake]

Geography
- Location within Japan
- Location: Hokkaido, Japan
- Parent range: Shiretoko Peninsula
- Topo map(s): Geospatial Information Authority 25000:1 海別岳; 25000:1 朱円; 50000:1 斜里

Geology
- Rock age: Quaternary
- Mountain type: Stratovolcano
- Volcanic arc: Kurile arc
- Last eruption: ca. 0.5 million years ago

Mount Unabetsu (海別岳, Unabetsu-dake) is a Quaternary stratovolcano. Its summit is 1,419.3 metres (4,656 ft). It is located on Hokkaido's Shiretoko Peninsula on the border of Shari in Shari District, Abashiri and Shibetsu in Shibetsu District, Nemuro.

== Geology ==
The mountain is made mainly of andesite and basalt.

== See also ==
- List of volcanoes in Japan
- List of mountains in Japan
