= Mount Iō (Shiretoko) =

Active stratovolcano on the island of Hokkaido, Japan

- 硫黄山
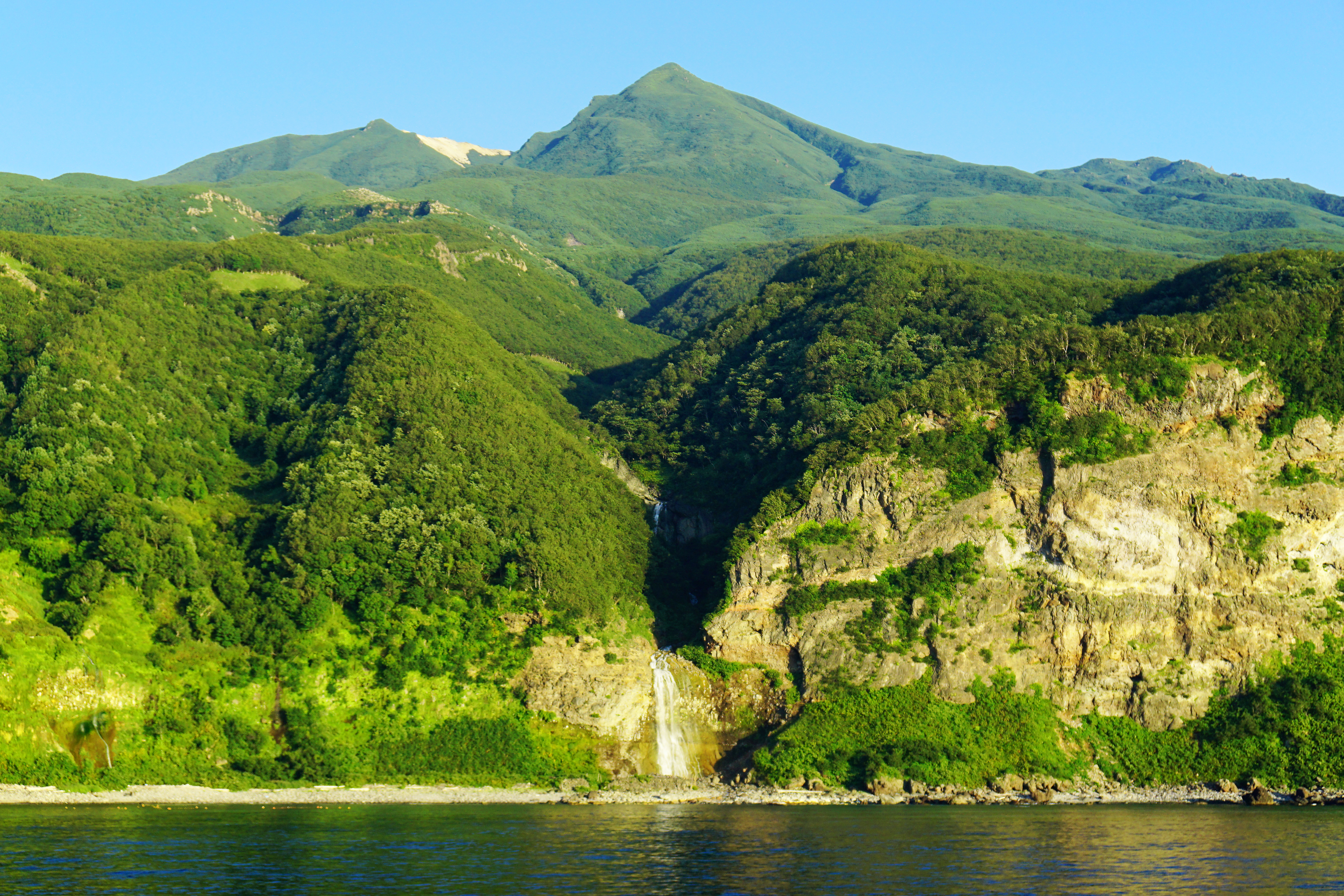
- Mount Iō and Kamuiwakka Falls (August 2014)

Highest point
- Elevation: 1,562.0 m (5,124.7 ft)
- Prominence: 243 m (797 ft)
- Parent peak: Mount Sashirui
- Listing: List of mountains in Japan; List of volcanoes in Japan
- Coordinates: 44°8′0″N 145°9′40″E

Naming
- English translation: Sulphur Mountain
- Language of name: Japanese

Geography
- Location within Japan
- Location: Hokkaidō, Japan
- Parent range: Shiretoko Peninsula
- Topo map(s): Geospatial Information Authority, 25000:1 硫黄山; 50000:1 羅臼

Geology
- Mountain type: Stratovolcano
- Volcanic arc: Kuril arc
- Last eruption: 1936

Mount Iō (硫黄山, Iō-zan) also Mount Iwo is an active andesitic stratovolcano on the Shiretoko Peninsula of Hokkaidō, Japan. It sits within the borders of the town of Shari. Mount Iō is known for erupting liquid sulphur in the eruptions of 1889 and 1936. Mount Iō literally means, sulphur mountain. There are two explosion craters and a lava dome at the summit of the volcano.

== History of eruptions ==
Volcanic activity started at least 240,000 years ago. Mount Iō has erupted at the following times:

1. 850 AD ± 500 years
2. 1857–1858
3. 23–26 September 1876
4. 24–26 November 1880
5. 9–26 August 1889
6. 15 June 1890–unknown
7. December 1935–October 1936

== See also ==
- Shiretoko National Park
- List of mountains in Japan
- List of volcanoes in Japan
