= Mount Samakke Nupuri =

Volcano in Hokkaido, Japan

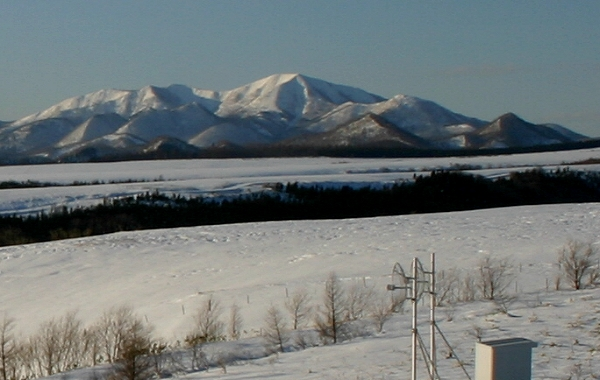
- Mt Samakke-nupuri.

Highest point
- Listing: List of mountains and hills of Japan by height
- Coordinates: 43°41′2.6″N 144°43′47.9″E

Geography
- Location within Hokkaido
- Location: Hokkaidō, Japan
- Parent range: Shiretoko Peninsula

Geology
- Rock age: Middle Pleistocene
- Mountain type: stratovolcano

Mount Samakke Nupuri (サマッケヌプリ山, Samakke Nupuri-yama) is a volcano located on the Shiretoko Peninsula in Hokkaido, northeastern Japan.
