= Mount Chienbetsu =

Stratovolcano on the island of Hokkaido, Japan

- Location within Japan

Highest point
- Listing: List of mountains and hills of Japan by height
- Coordinates: 44°7′28.5″N 145°10′7.5″E

Geography
- Location: Hokkaido, Japan
- Parent range: Shiretoko Peninsula

Geology
- Rock age: Middle Pleistocene
- Mountain type: stratovolcano

Mount Chienbetsu (知円別岳, Chienbetsu-dake) is a volcano located on the Shiretoko Peninsula in Hokkaido, Japan.
