= Mount Okkabake =

Stratovolcano on the island of Hokkaido, Japan

- Location within Hokkaido

Highest point
- Listing: List of mountains and hills of Japan by height
- Coordinates: 44°06′17.6″N 145°08′49.9″E

Geography
- Location: Hokkaido, Japan
- Parent range: Shiretoko Peninsula

Geology
- Rock age: Middle Pleistocene
- Mountain type: stratovolcano

Mount Okkabake (オッカバケ岳, Okkabake-dake) is a volcano located on the Shiretoko Peninsula in Hokkaido, northeastern Japan. Mount Okkabake is the source of Okkabake River, which leads into the Nemuro Strait.
