= Mount Poromoi =

Volcano in Hokkaido, Japan

- Location within Japan

Highest point
- Listing: List of mountains and hills of Japan by height
- Coordinates: 44°18′35″N 145°18′10″E

Geography
- Location: Hokkaido, Japan
- Parent range: Shiretoko Peninsula

Geology
- Rock age: Middle Pleistocene
- Mountain type: Stratovolcano
- Volcanic arc: Kurile arc

Mount Poromoi (ポロモイ岳, Poromoi-dake) is a volcano on the Shiretoko Peninsula in Hokkaido, northeastern Japan.

== Etymology ==
Mount Poromoi's name is from Ainu, "ポロモイ" (poro-moi), meaning "a large bay", referring to the beach along the nearby town of Rausu.
