= Mount Shiretoko =

Volcano in Japan

- 知床岳
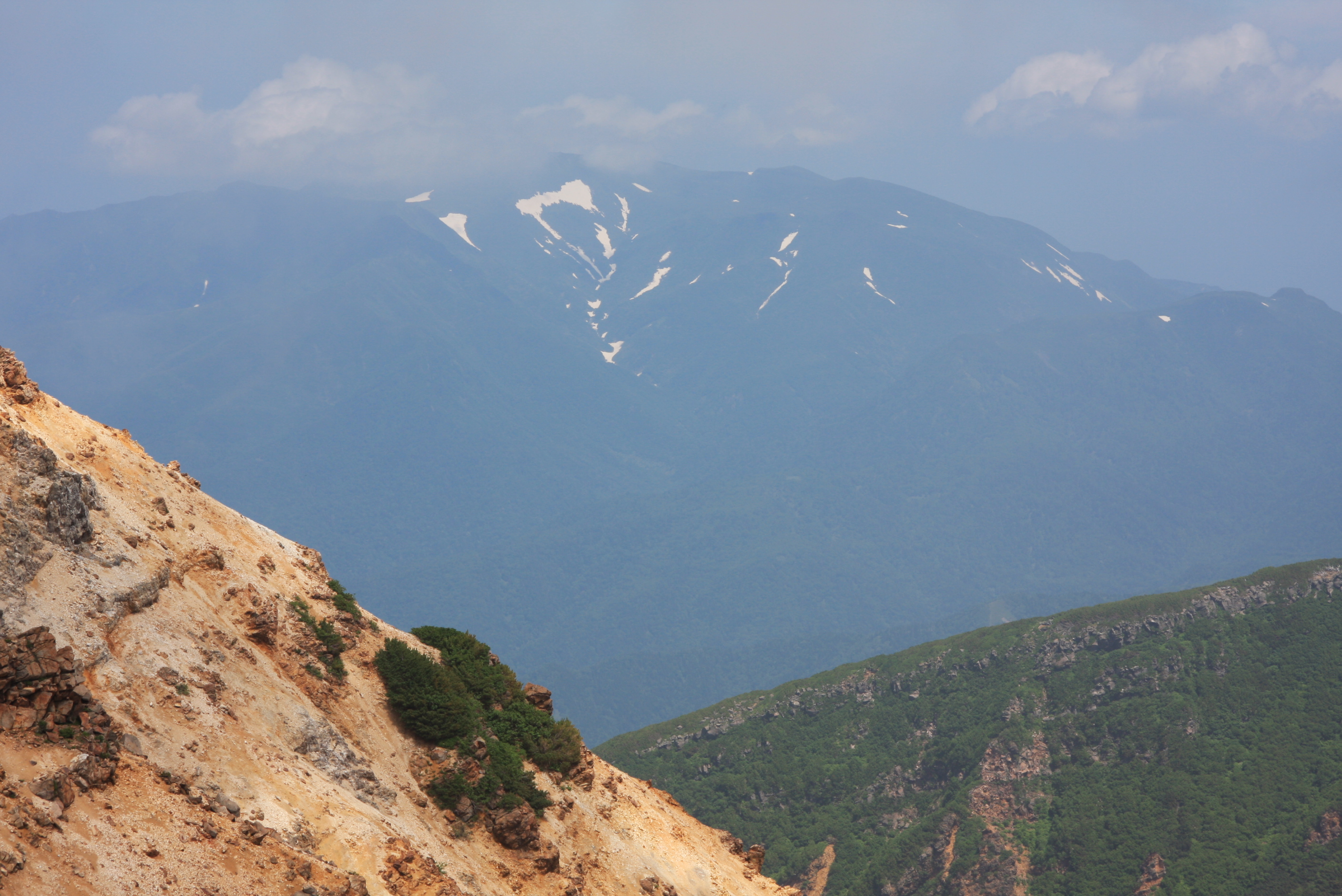
- Mount Shiretoko

Highest point
- Elevation: 1,253.9 m (4,114 ft)
- Prominence: 980 m (3,220 ft)
- Parent peak: Mount Higashi
- Listing: List of mountains and hills of Japan by height
- Coordinates: 44°14′9″N 145°16′26″E

Geography
- Location within Japan
- Location: Okhotsk Subprefecture, Hokkaido, Japan
- Parent range: Shiretoko Peninsula
- Topo map(s): Geospatial Information Authority 25000:1 知床岳; 50000:1 知床岬

Geology
- Rock age: Middle Pleistocene
- Mountain type: stratovolcano
- Volcanic arc: Kurile arc
- Last eruption: 200,000 years ago

Mount Shiretoko (知床岳, Shiretoko-dake) is a volcano located on the Shiretoko Peninsula in Hokkaido, Japan. The mountain consists of non-alkali mafic rocks and andesite. Mount Shiretoko is in Shari town, in Shari District of Okhotsk Subprefecture.

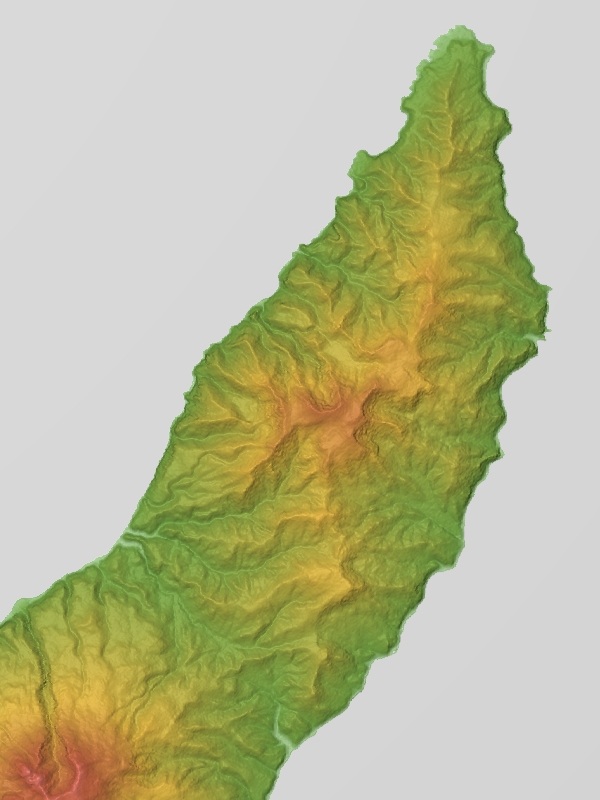
Relief map

== See also ==
- List of volcanoes in Japan
- List of mountains in Japan
