= Shiretoko Goko Lakes =

Group of lakes in Japan

- 知床五湖
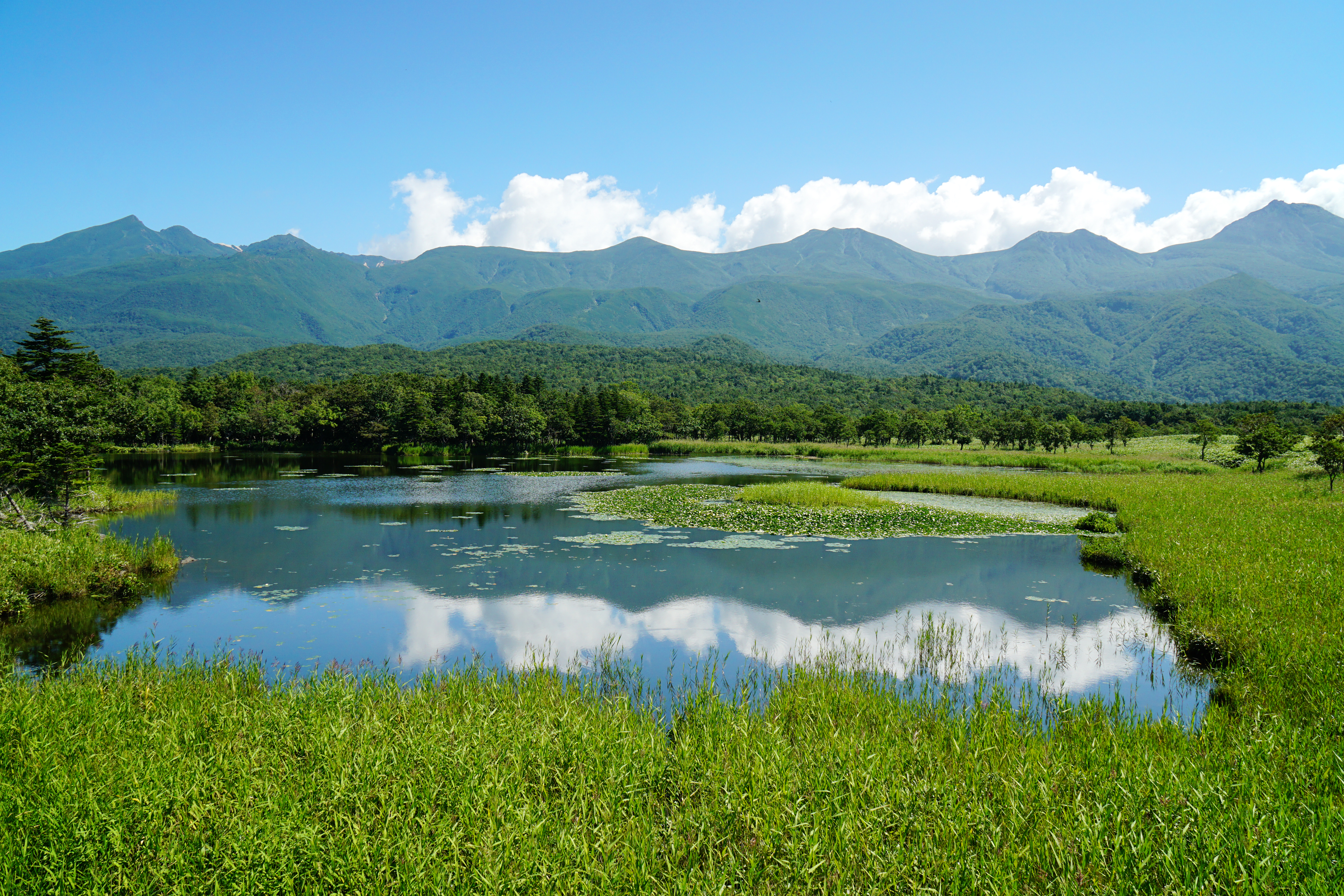

- Location within Japan
- Location: Shiretoko Peninsula, Okhotsk Subprefecture, Hokkaidō, Japan
- Coordinates: 44°7′32″N 145°4′52″E
- Basin countries: Japan

Shiretoko Goko Lakes (知床五湖) are five small lakes in Shiretoko Peninsula, Hokkaidō, Japan.

It is a tourist destination, one of the Shiretoko Eight Views, with an observation deck overlooking Lake Ichiko and a wooden path of 1.6 km that goes around the lake. The lake region is inhabited by deer and bears, among other animals.

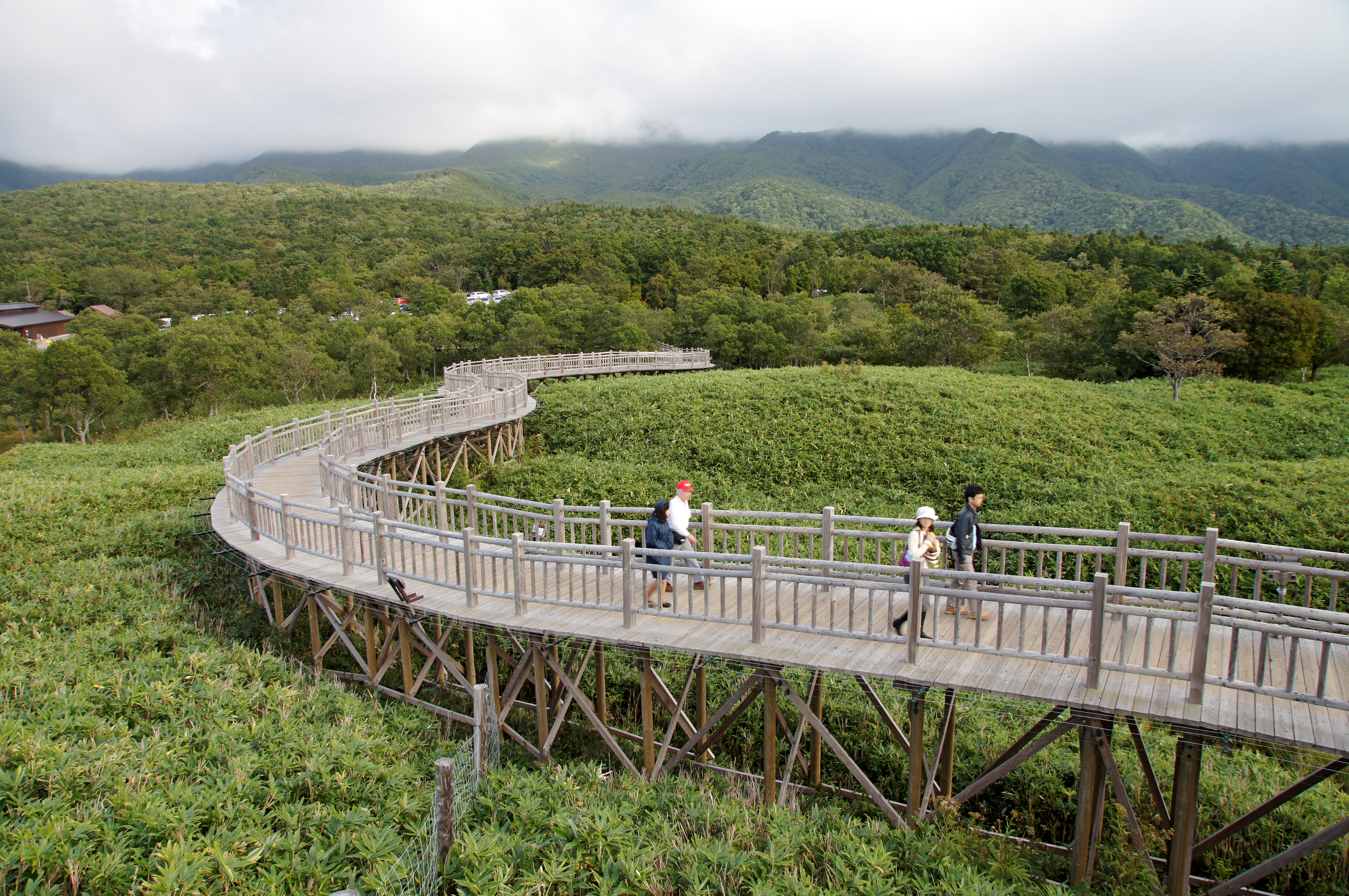

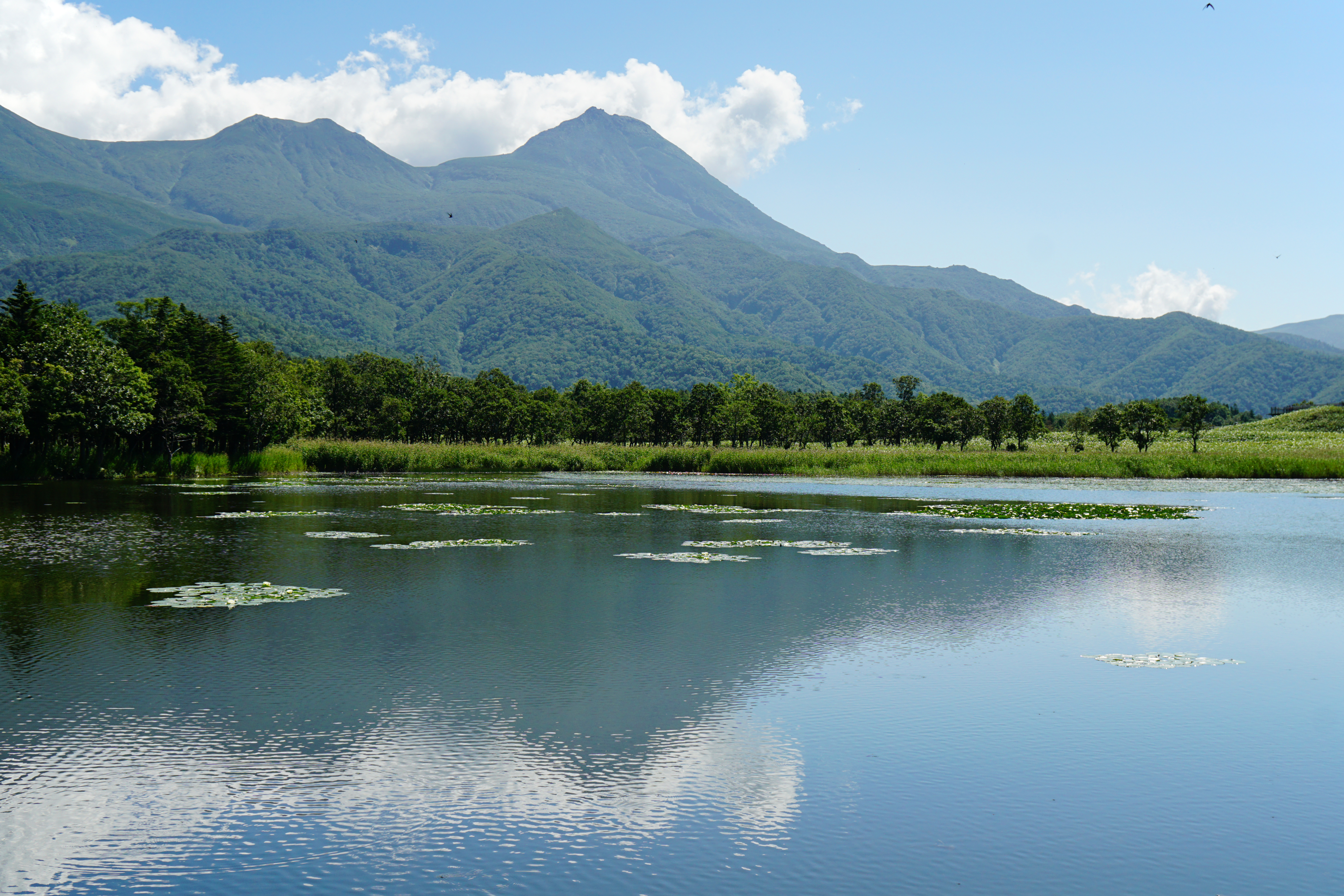

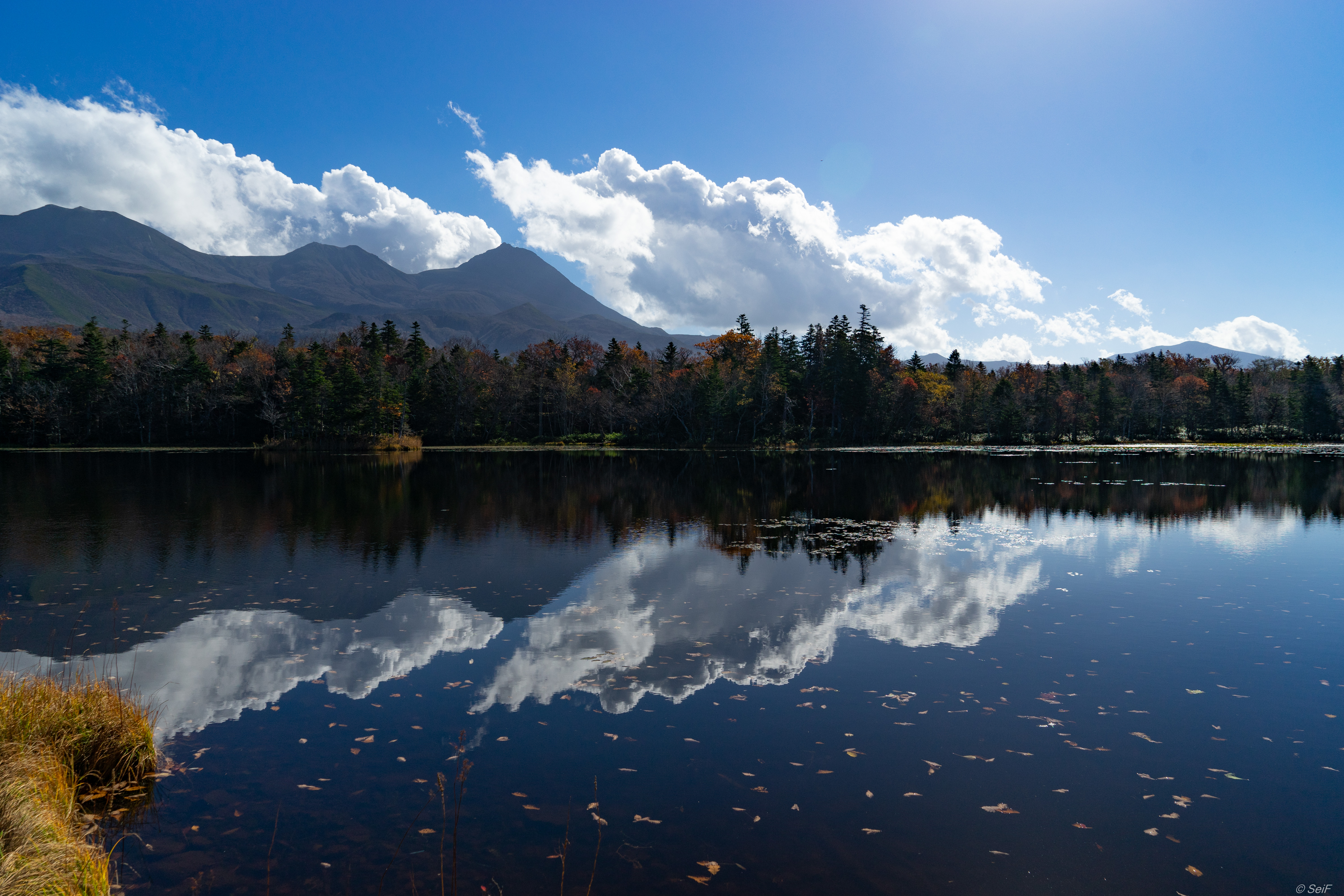

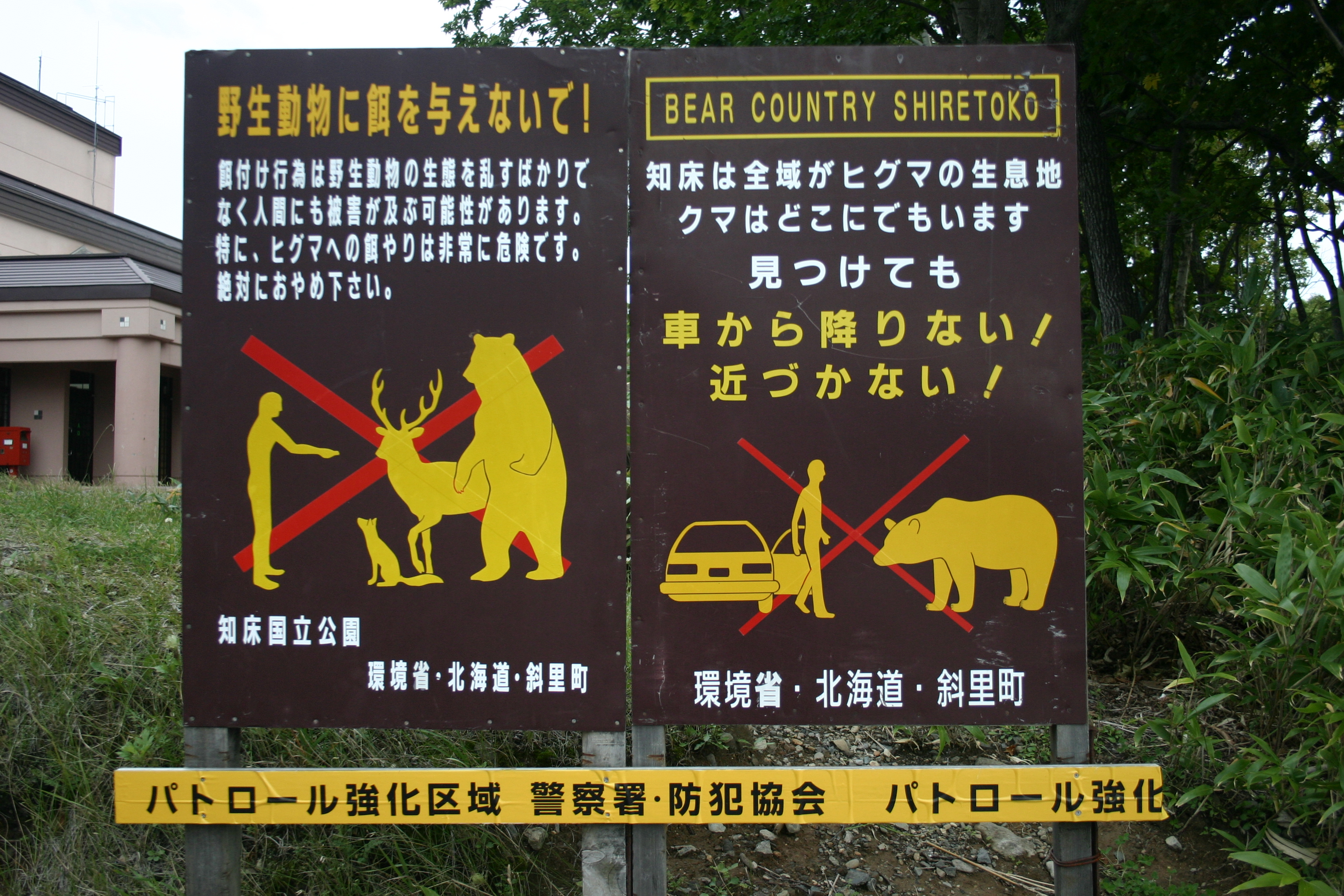

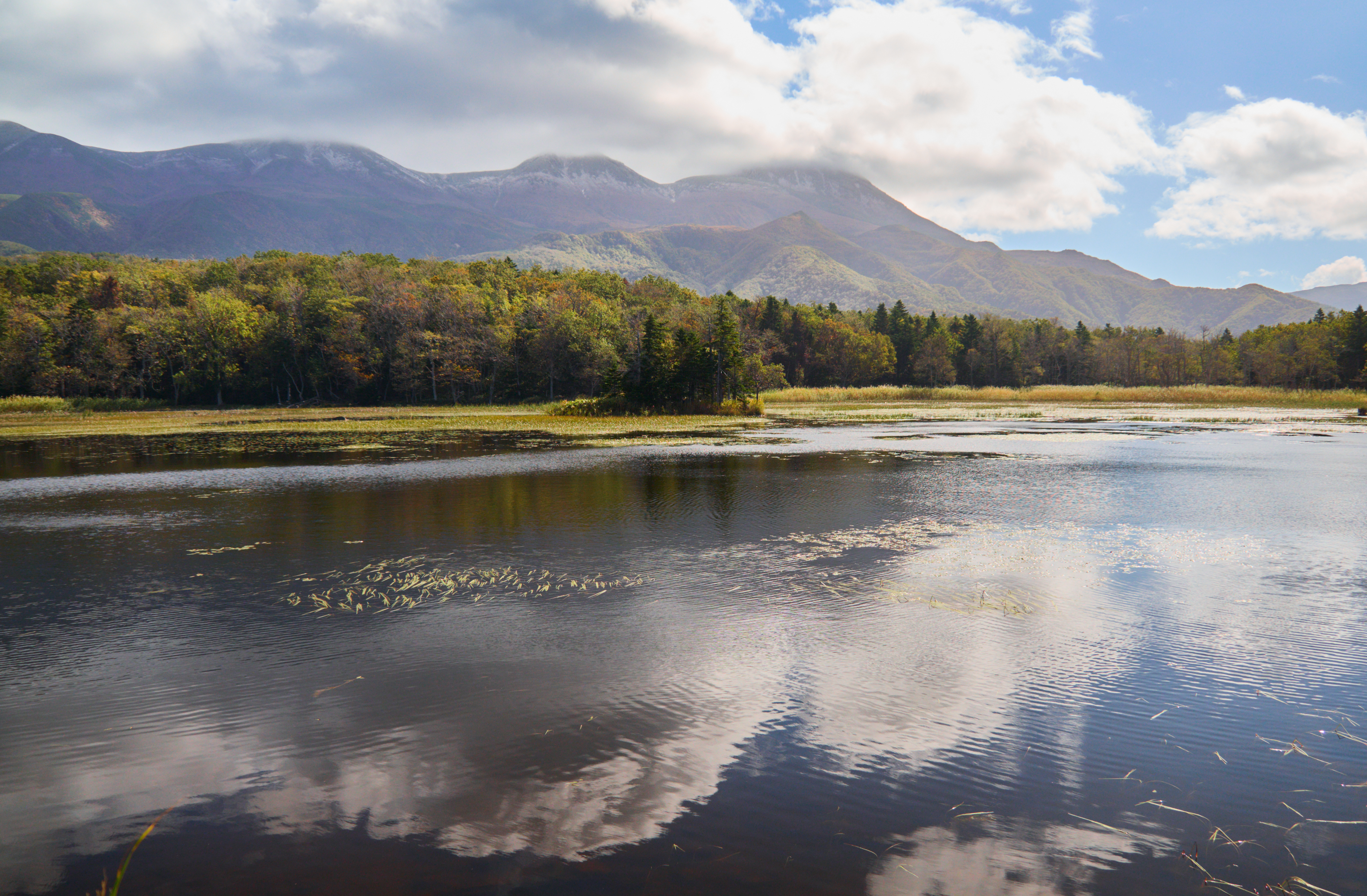

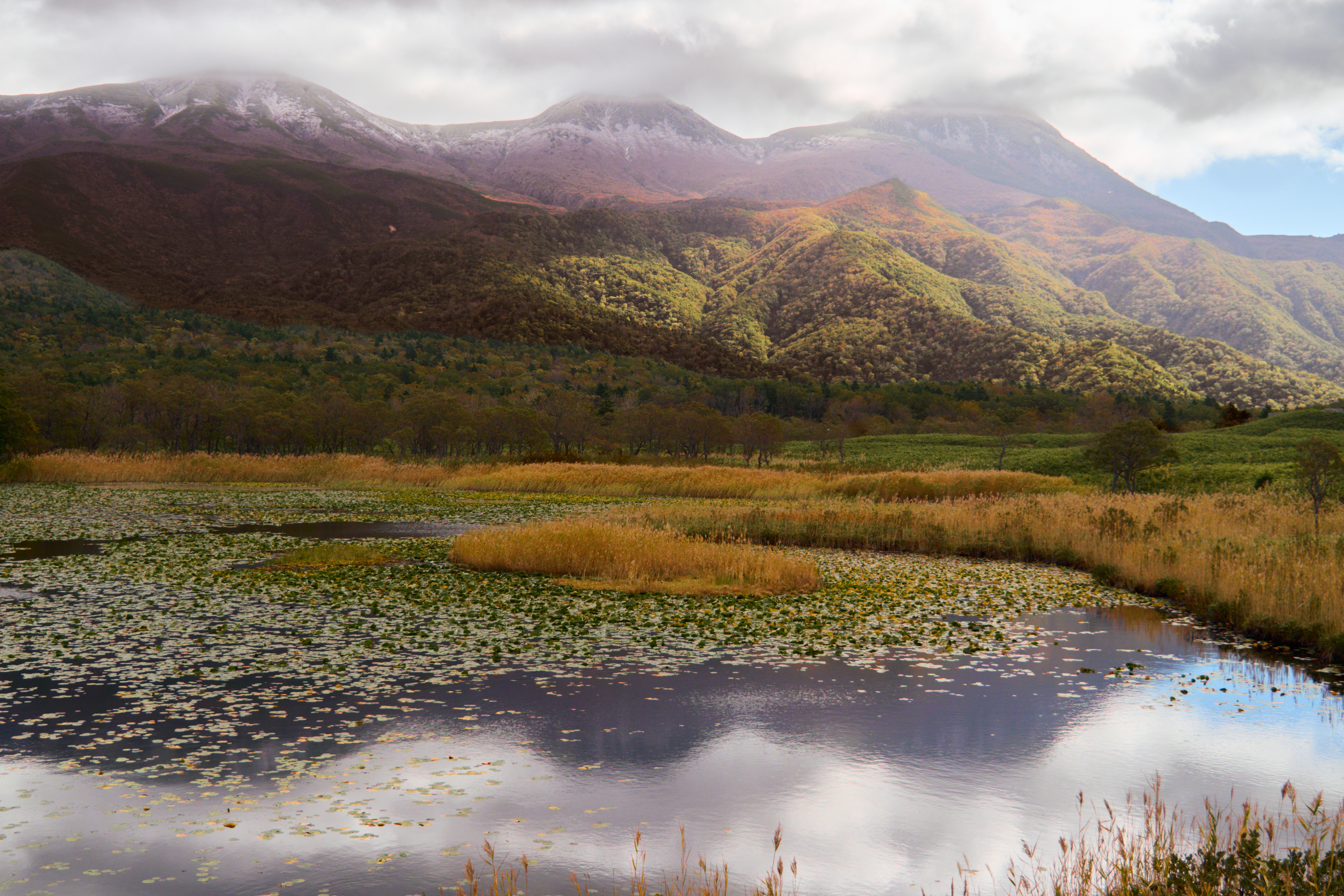
