= Mount Chinishibetsu =

Volcano in Hokkaido, Japan

- Chinishibetsu-dake
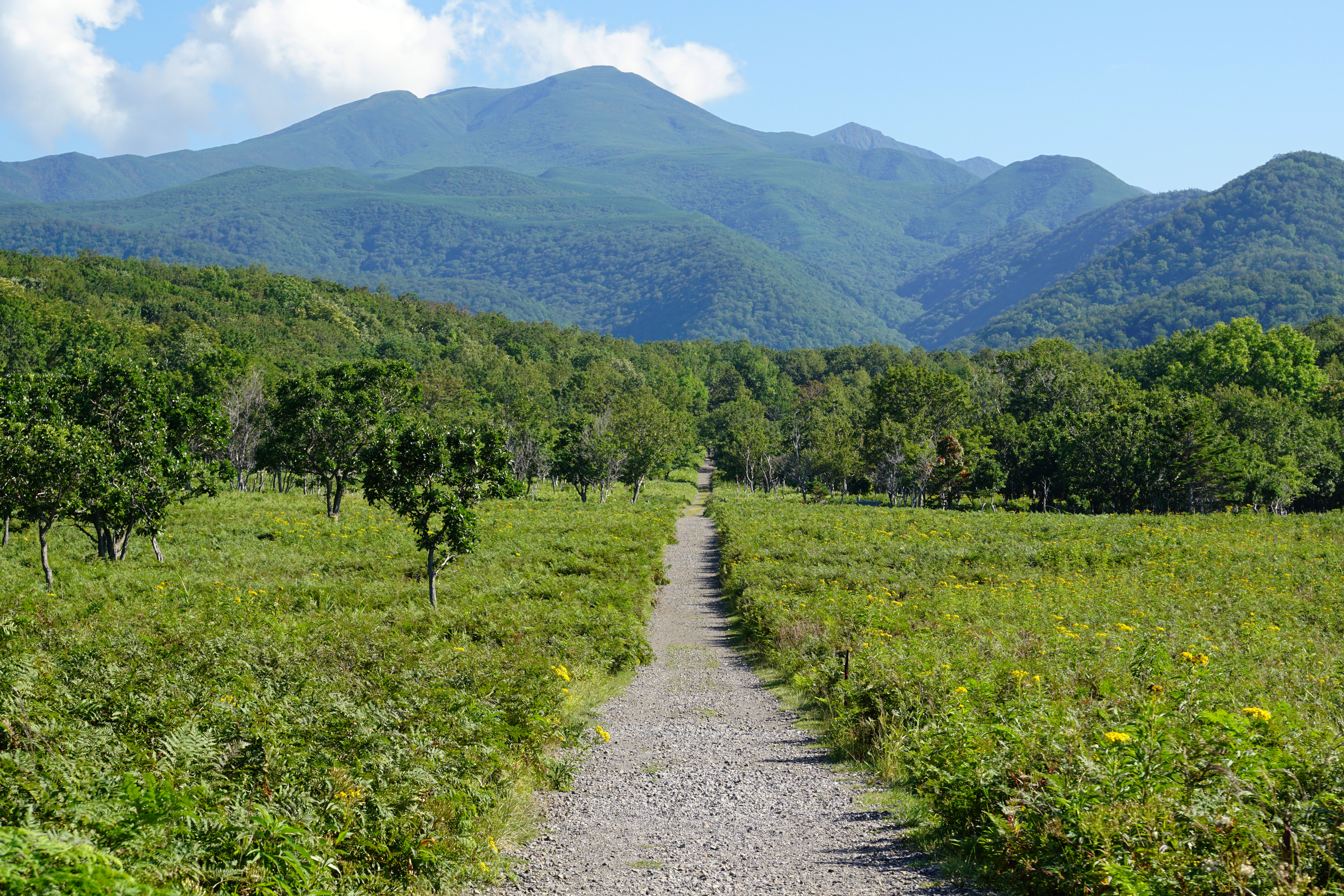
- Seen from the NNE.

Highest point
- Listing: List of mountains and hills of Japan by height
- Coordinates: 44°01′20.9″N 145°03′8.8″E

Geography
- Location within Japan
- Location: Hokkaidō, Japan
- Parent range: Shiretoko Peninsula

Geology
- Rock age: Middle Pleistocene
- Mountain type: stratovolcano

Mount Chinishibetsu (知西別岳, Chinishibetsu-dake) is a volcano located on the Shiretoko Peninsula in Hokkaidō, northeastern Japan.
