= Mount Dokkarimui =

Mountain in Hokkaido, Japan

- Location within Japan

Highest point
- Listing: List of mountains and hills of Japan by height
- Coordinates: 44°09′56″N 145°16′41″E

Geography
- Location: Hokkaido, Japan
- Parent range: Shiretoko Peninsula

Geology
- Rock age: Middle Pleistocene
- Mountain type: stratovolcano

Mount Dokkarimui (トッカリムイ岳, Dokkarimui-dake) is a volcano located on the Shiretoko Peninsula in Hokkaido, Japan.
