= Mount Sashirui =

- Sashirui-dake
- Location within Hokkaido

Highest point
- Listing: List of mountains and hills of Japan by height
- Coordinates: 44°05′42.7″N 145°08′36.8″E

Geography
- Location: Hokkaido, Japan
- Parent range: Shiretoko Peninsula

Geology
- Rock age: Middle Pleistocene
- Mountain type: Stratovolcano

Mount Sashirui (サシルイ岳, Sashirui-dake) is a volcano located on the Shiretoko Peninsula in Hokkaido, northeastern Japan.
