= Shiretoko Peninsula =

Peninsula in Eastern Hokkaido

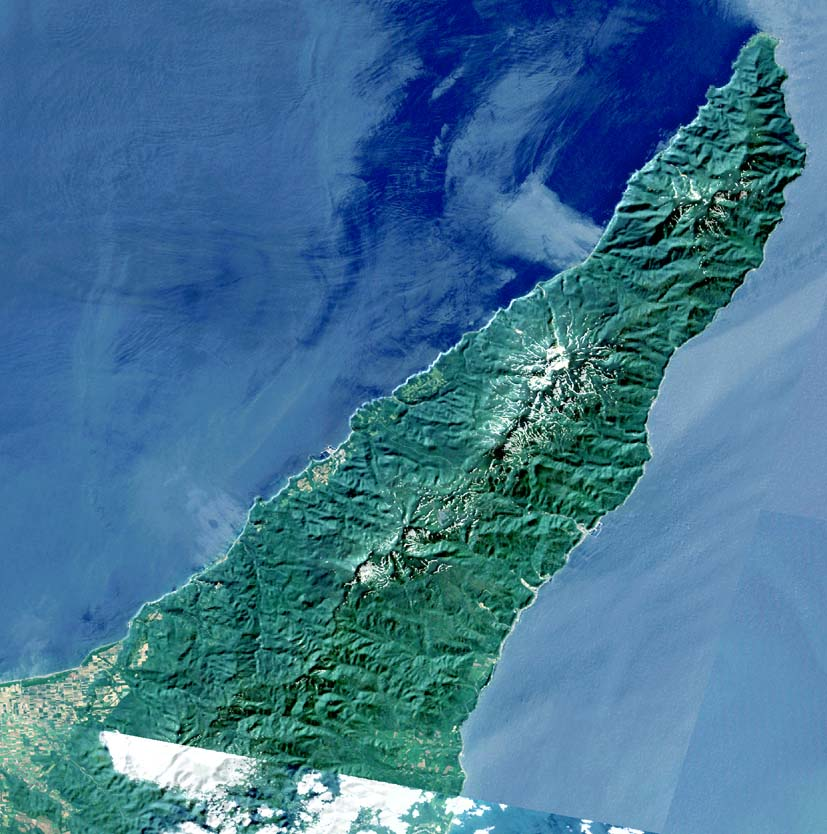
- A satellite image of the Shiretoko Peninsula

Highest point
- Peak: Mount Rausu, Shari and Rausu
- Elevation: 1,661 m (5,449 ft)
- Coordinates: 44°4′33″N 145°7′21″E

Dimensions
- Length: 70 km (43 mi) SW-NE
- Width: 25 km (16 mi) NW-SE
- Area: 1,230 km^{2} (470 mi^{2})

Naming
- Etymology: Ainu sir etok, "the end of the Earth" or "the place where the Earth protrudes"
- Native name: 知床半島 (Japanese); Shiretoko hantō (Japanese)

Geography
- Northeastern corner of the archipelago
- Country: Japan
- State: Hokkaido
- Regions: Okhotsk Subprefecture; Nemuro Subprefecture
- Districts: Menashi District; Shari District; Shibetsu District
- Range coordinates: 44°5.8′N 145°9.2′E

Geology
- Orogeny: Island arc
- Rock type: Volcanic

UNESCO World Heritage Site
- Official name: Shiretoko
- Criteria: Natural: (ix), (x)
- Reference: 1193
- Inscription: 2005 (29th Session)
- Area: 71,100 ha (176,000 acres)

The Shiretoko Peninsula (知床半島, Shiretoko hantō) is located on the easternmost portion of the Japanese island of Hokkaido, protruding into the Sea of Okhotsk. It is separated from Kunashiri Island by the Nemuro Strait. The name Shiretoko is derived from the Ainu word sir etok, meaning "the end of the Earth" or "the place where the Earth protrudes". The towns of Rausu and Shari are found on the peninsula.

The Shiretoko Peninsula was registered as a UNESCO World Heritage Site in 2005, in recognition of the peninsula being the southernmost point where sea ice usually forms in the Northern Hemisphere.

== Geography ==
Location of Shiretoko Peninsula

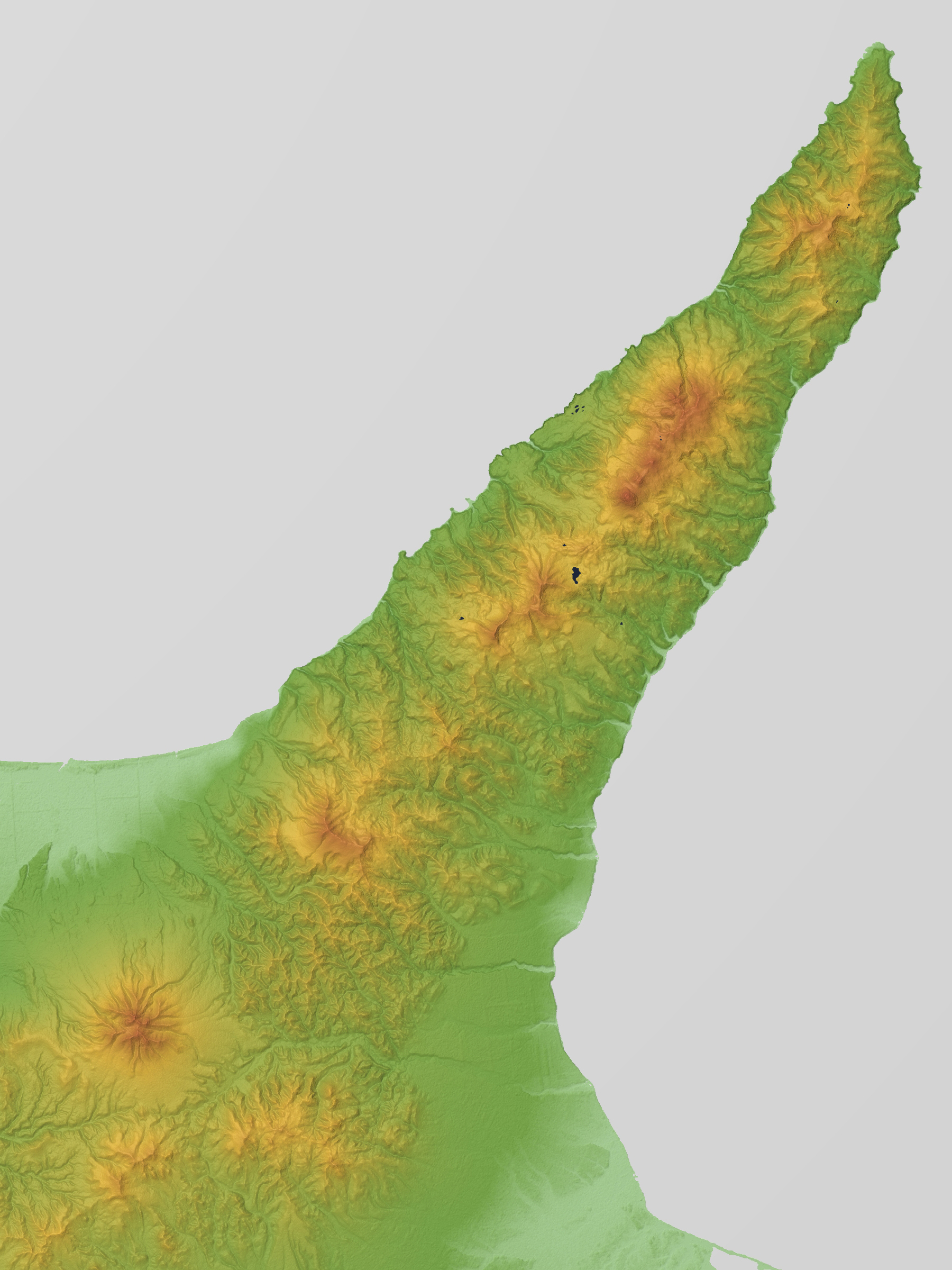
Relief Map

From Shiretoko Cape at the tip of the peninsula, a series of volcanoes runs down the peninsula, including Mount Shiretoko, Mount Unabetsu, and Mount Iō. It is part of the Chishima volcanic zone. The highest peak is Mount Rausu. The peninsula is 70 kilometres (43 mi) long and 25 kilometres (16 mi) wide at its base. It covers some 123,000 hectares (470 sq mi)

The peninsula is bounded on the northwest side by the Sea of Okhotsk and the southeast side by the Pacific Ocean. To the east, Kunashiri Island runs parallel to the peninsula. The Kunashiri can be seen from Shiretoko Peninsula. Kunashiri has been occupied by Russia since September 1, 1945, and disputed by Japan.

The cold Oyashio Current flows southwest along the east side of the peninsula, and the Soya Current flows southeast from the Sea of Okhotsk until it is redirected north along the west side of the peninsula. In winter, the Soya Current carries sea ice south from the Sea of Okhotsk where it dams along the west side of the Shiretoko Peninsula resulting in the lowest latitude regularly occurring sea ice on earth at 43 degrees north.

The volcanic zone has made several onsen possible, including Seseki Onsen and Iwaobetsu Onsen.

=== List of peaks ===
- Mount Poromoi
- Mount Shiretoko
- Mount Dokkarimui
- Mount Rusha
- Mount Higashi
- Mount Chienbetsu
- Mount Minami
- Mount Iō
- Mount Okkabake
- Mount Sashirui
- Mount Rausu
- Mount Chinishibetsu
- Mount Onnebetsu
- Mount Unabetsu
- Mount Shari
- Mount Samakke Nupuri
- Mount Shibetsu

== Climate ==
The Oyashio Current profoundly impacts the weather of the peninsula. Shiretoko Peninsula has short summers and long winters. The current causes fog on the southeastern coast and sea ice in the winter. Snow covers the peaks from September to June, except the very highest peaks, which retain snow all summer long.

The strong subarctic ocean current makes it difficult for boats to navigate. On April 23, 2022, a 19-ton tourist boat with 26 people on board sank during a tour around the Shiretoko peninsula. The boat was found 100 meters below sea level near the scenic site Kashuni Falls. The bodies of 14 people were found and 12 went missing.

== Flora and fauna ==
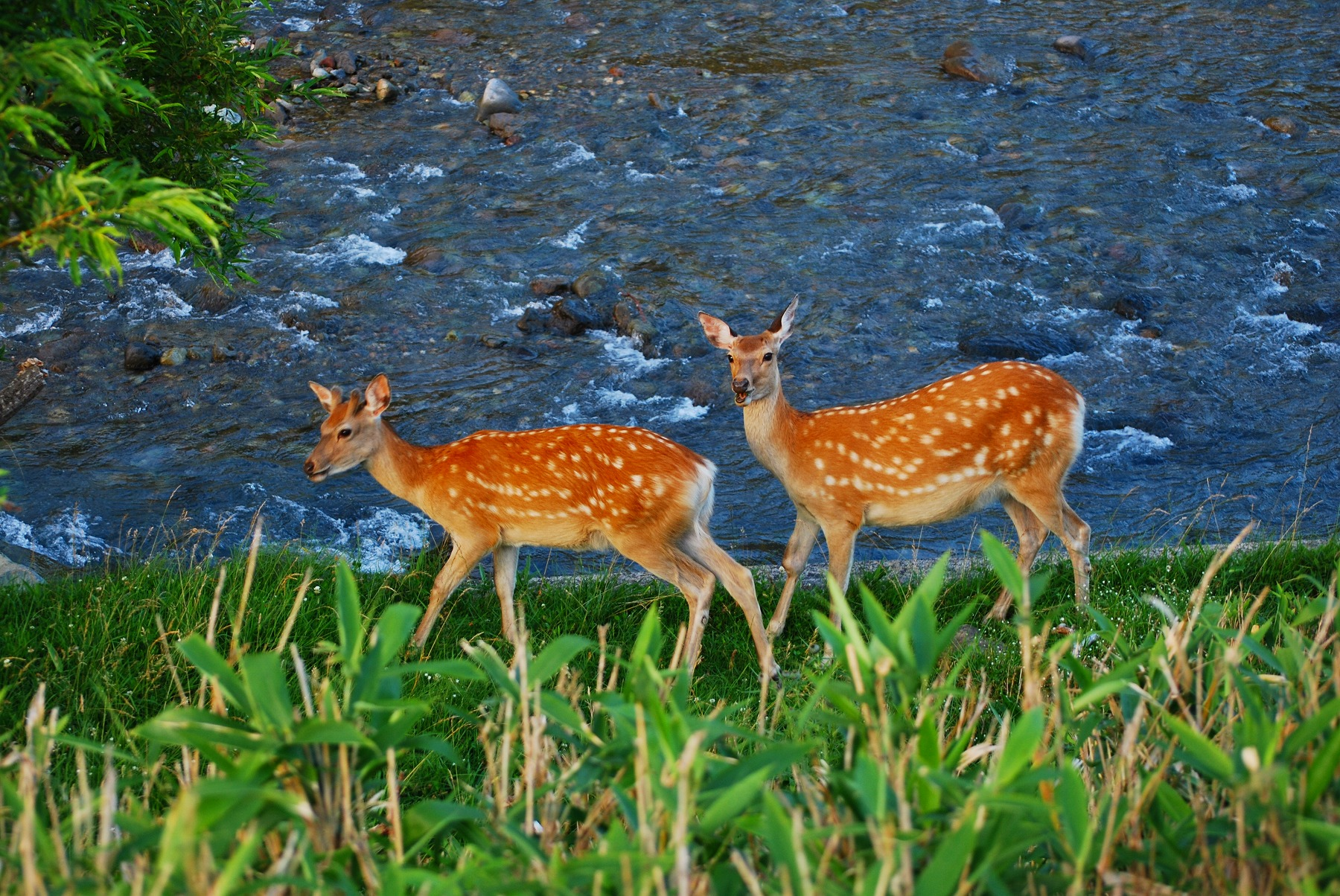
Sika deer

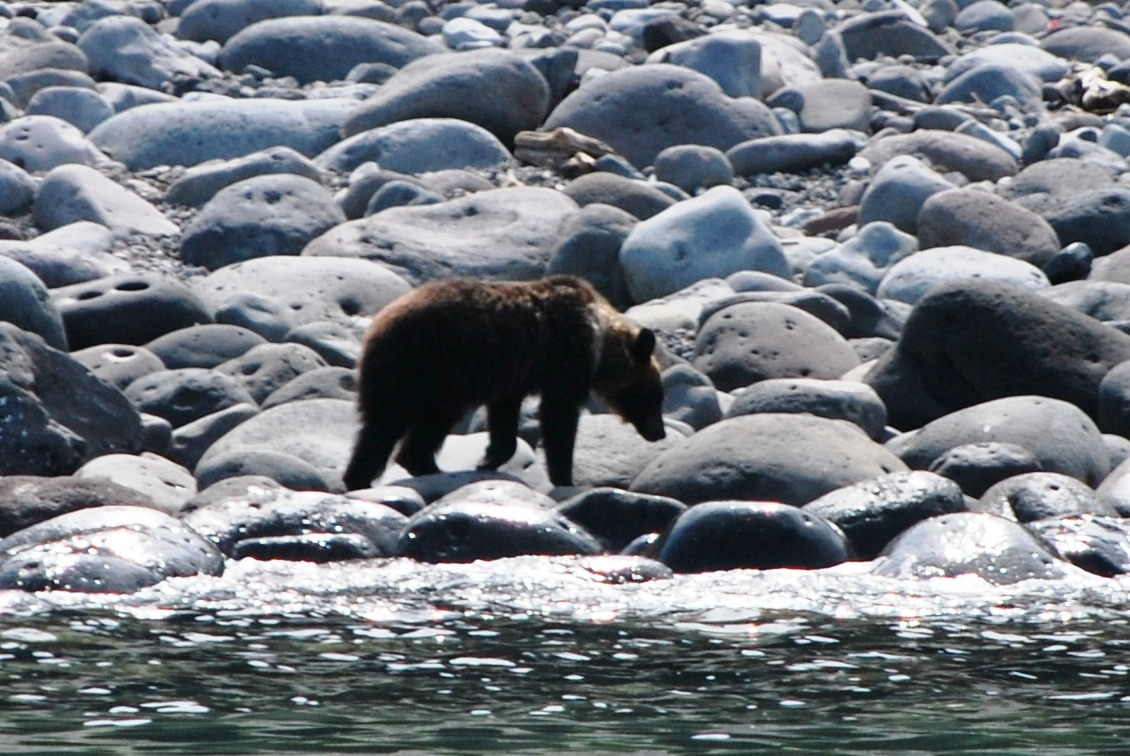
Hokkaido brown bear

The Shiretoko Peninsula is home to many species of both conifers and broadleaf trees, including the acorn-bearing Quercus mongolica (mizunara). Siberian dwarf pine trees grow above 1,000 metres (3,000 ft). Red foxes and sika deer also inhabit the area. There are a large number of Ussuri brown bears. The upper reaches of Mount Rausu, Mount Onnebetsu, and Mount Shari are the only known breeding areas of Arctic warblers in Hokkaidō. Sea eagles flourish here, and seals can be often seen on the coast. The last confirmed record of Japanese otter in Hokkaido was from Shari River

Whale watching is a popular attraction for tourists. Thirteen or fourteen species of cetaceans have been recorded in the area. Especially for orcas, or killer whales, the waters surrounding the peninsula are regarded as one of the most significant habitat areas in the northwestern Pacific. There was a notable mass stranding of twelve animals in February 2005. Nine animals died. In 2019, two white individuals have been sighted. In 2019 and 2021, several white individuals were seen.

Shiretoko Peninsula is one of the few places where groups of male sperm whales and beaked whales including Baird's beaked whales can be spotted from the shore. Other frequently seen species include minke whales, Pacific white-sided dolphins, Dall's porpoises, and harbour porpoises. Newly described Sato's beaked whale inhabits the area as well.。

Endangered populations of humpback whales and fin whales in the Sea of Okhotsk have started to recover in recent years. Some beluga whales, or white whales, that are thought to be vagrants from the endangered population in the northern Sea of Okhotsk do occur, specifically a sub-adult individual that continuously appeared at the town of Shibetsu for several years in the 2000s. North Pacific right whales, the most endangered of all the great whales, have been observed close to the shore mainly on the Sea of Okhotsk side of the peninsula for several times including in 2013, 2018, and 2019 with several sightings noted in 2013 and 2019, and 2018 sighting and one of 2019 sighting have been made by the same tour operator, Doutou Kanko Kaihatsu (Corporation) (jp:道東観光開発). From June 21 to 23, 2015, the first ever sighting of a bowhead whale in the Japanese EEZ occurred (the first record of the species in the nation was of a catch record in Osaka Bay on June 23, 1969). Several records from whaling days show blue whales to have been harpooned and landed at Abashiri port, though this species normally does not enter adjacent seas and are now thought to be almost extinct in Japan's waters. As deep, productive water, some species of beaked whales favor the area including Cuvier's beaked whales, Stejneger's beaked whales, and others. Baird's beaked whales, the largest of this group, are most frequently observed close to shore. An unidentified form or subspecies of beaked whale is known to inhabit the waters off Shiretoko Peninsula and Abashiri. Long-finned pilot whales which once inhabited the waters around Hokkaido are thought to have become extinct in the 12th century, but unconfirmed sightings of short-finned pilot whales have been reported in Nemuro Strait though the area is out of their normal range.

There is notable flora diversity including endemic Cymathaere japonica, endangered species such as Viola kitamiana (Japanese) which Japanese name was named after Shiretoko Peninsula, Dendranthema arcticum, Astragalus japonicus.

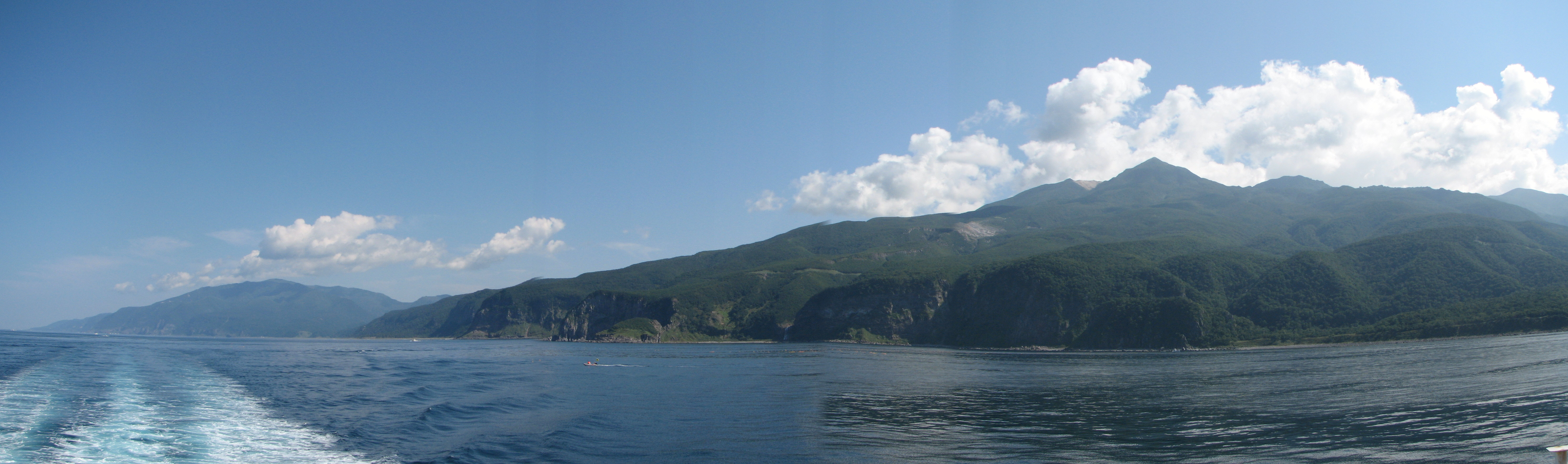
Shiretoko National Park

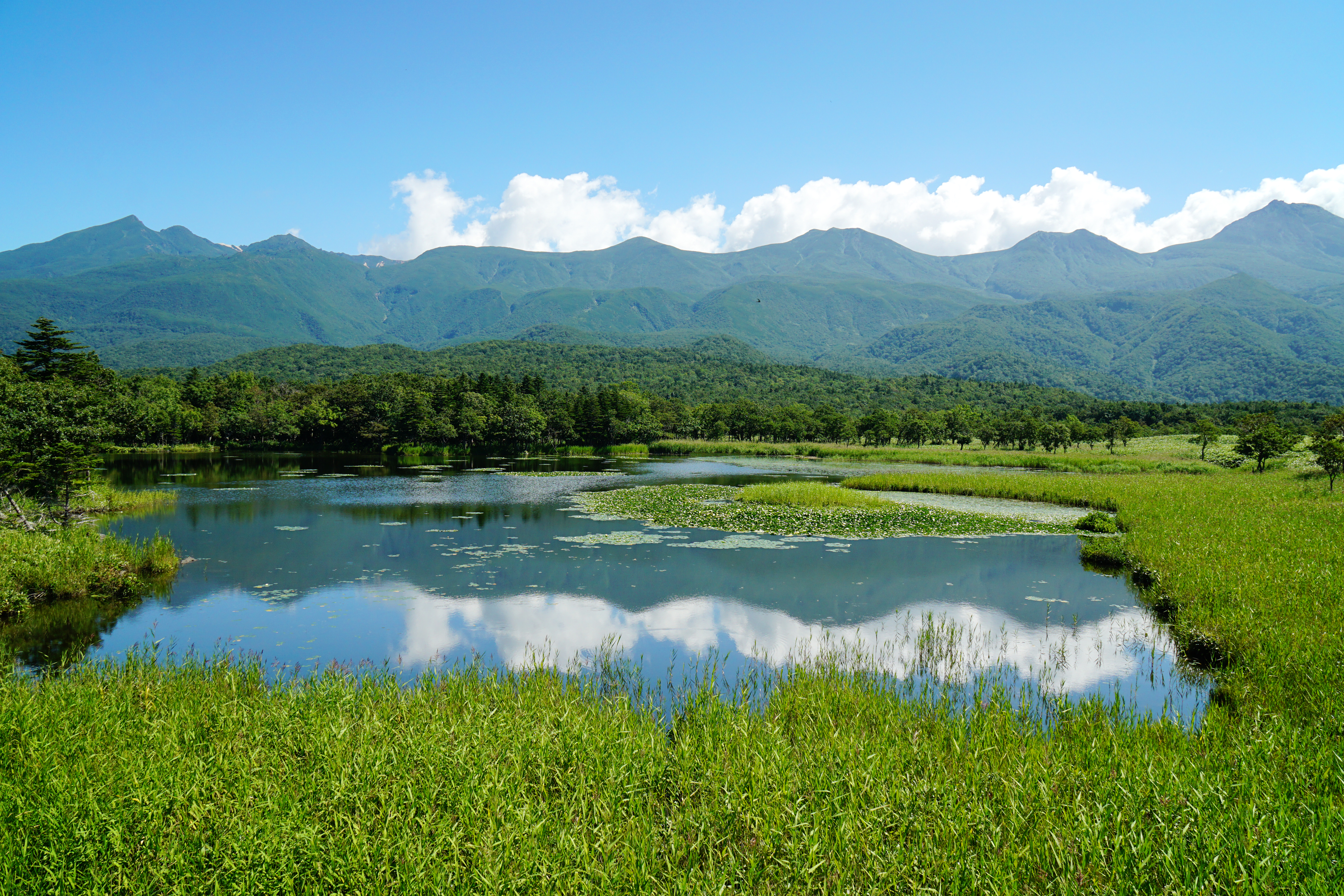
Shiretoko Goko Lakes

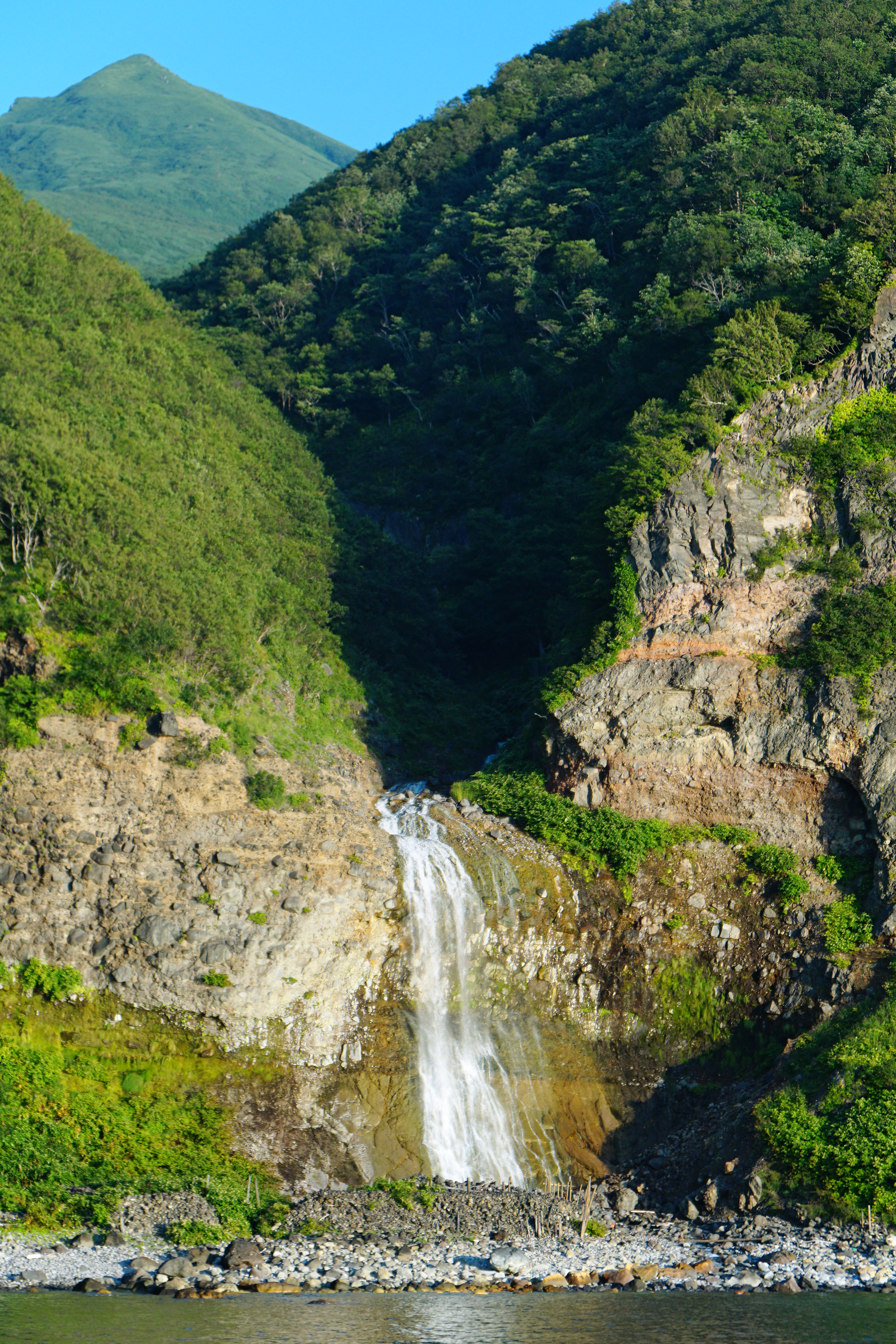
Kamuiwakka Falls and Mount Io

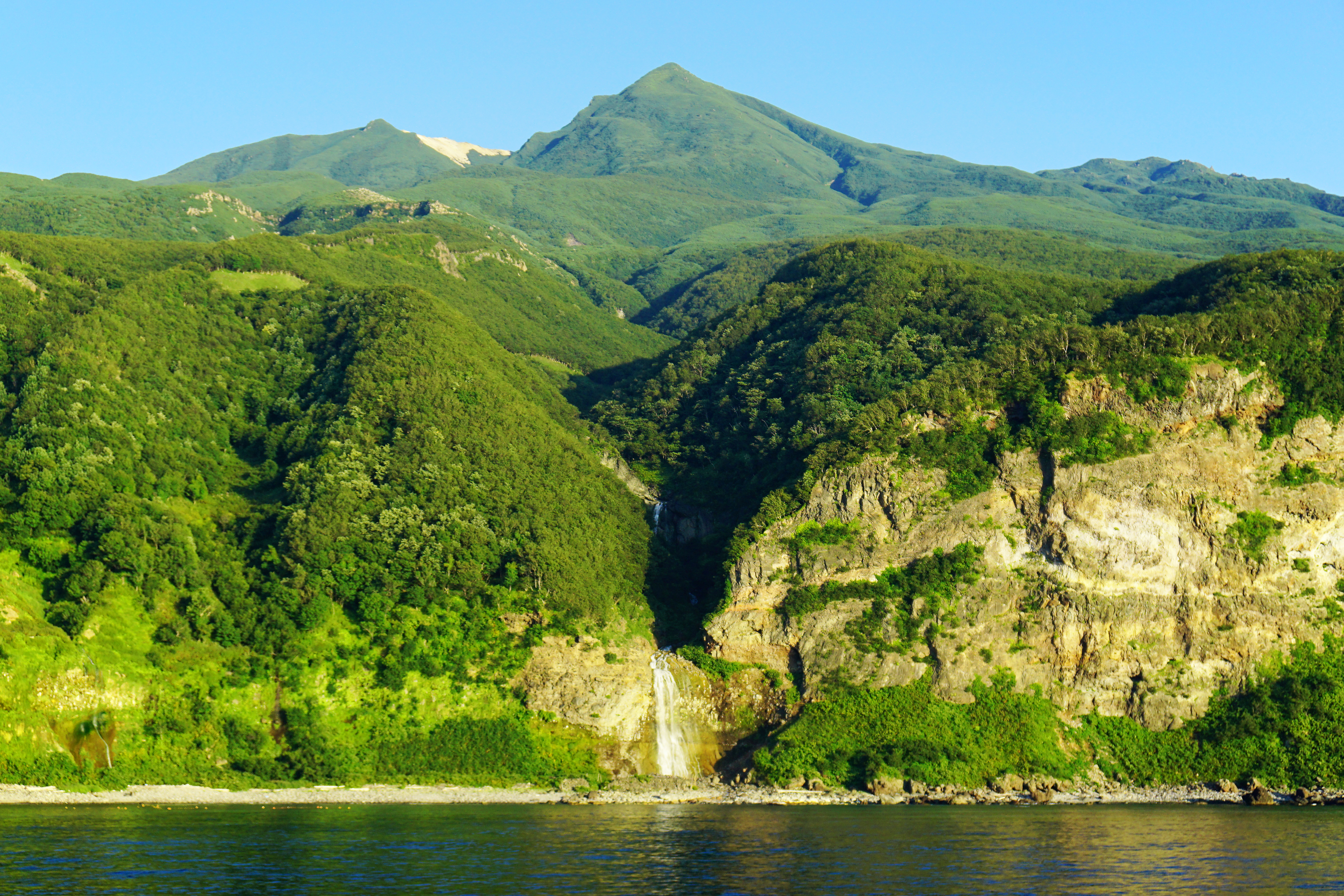
Kamuiwakka Falls and Mount Io

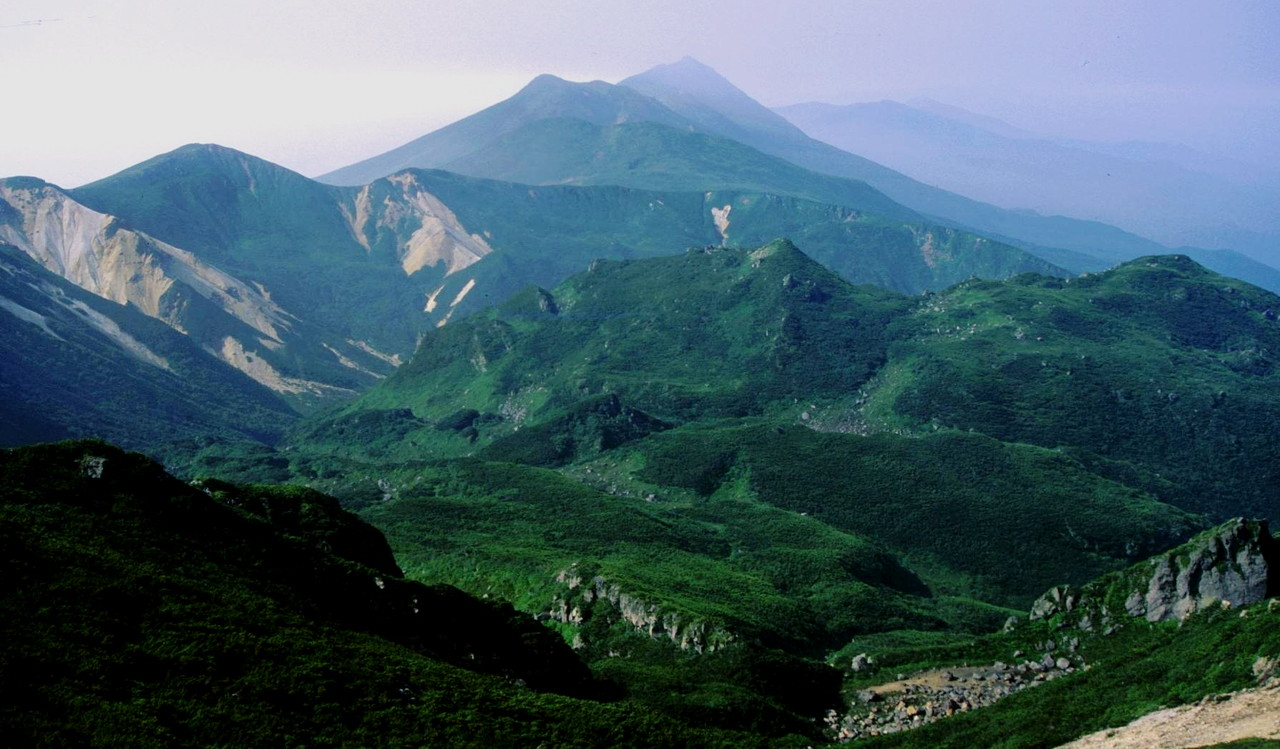
Mount Rausu from Mount Io

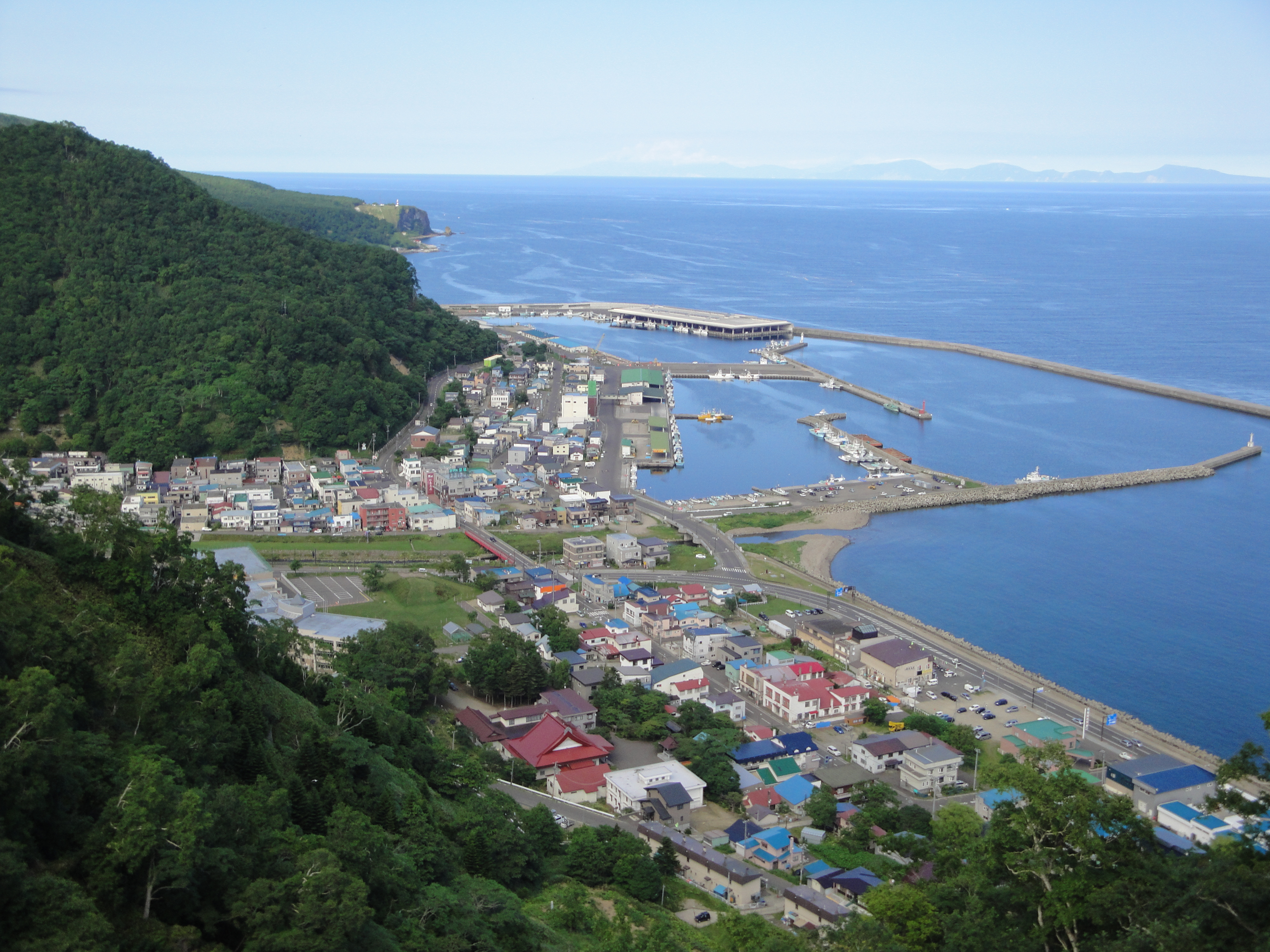
Rausu town

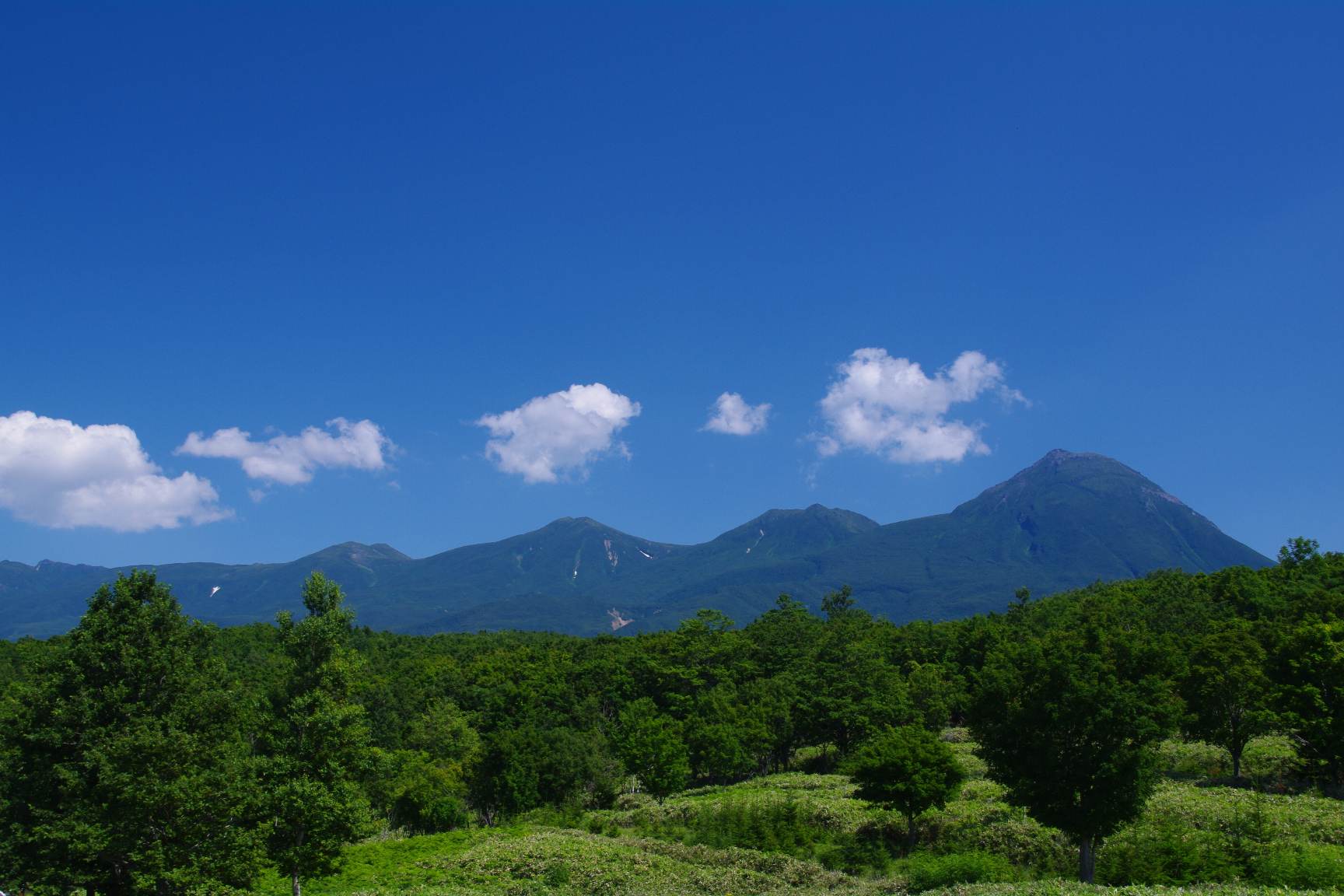
Shiretoko 5 peaks

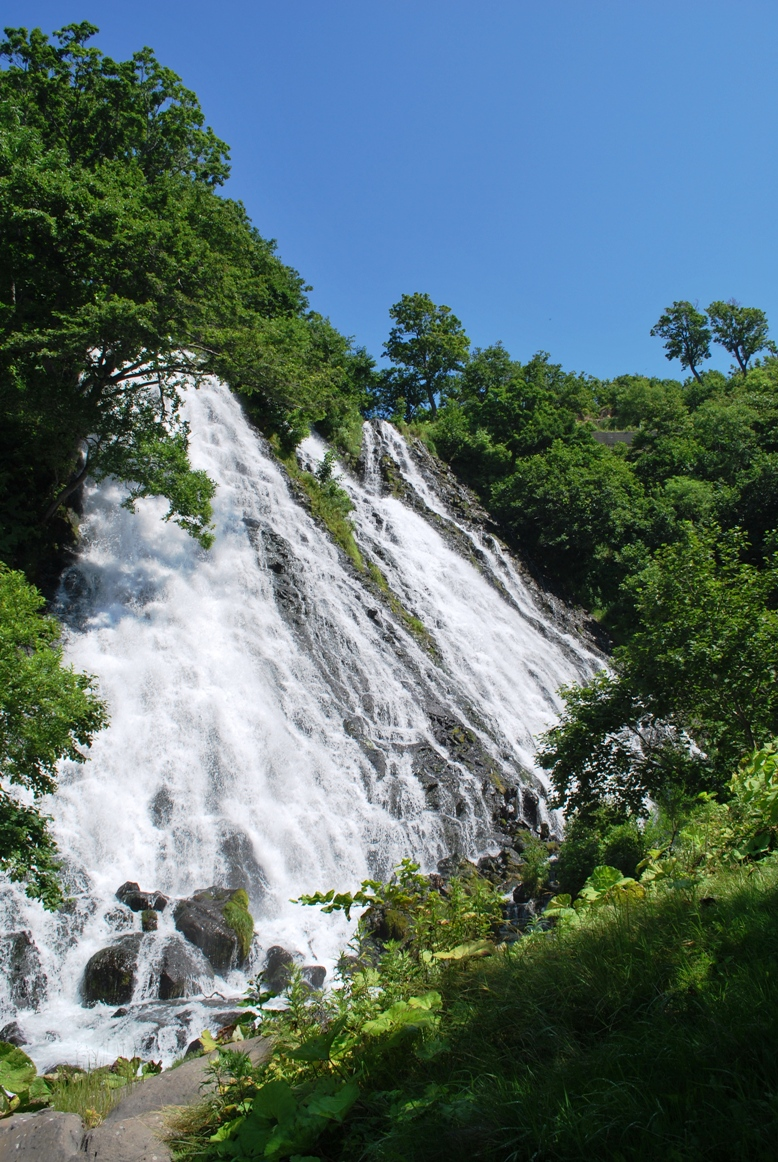
Waterfall of Oshinkoshin

== Conservation efforts ==
To protect the wild animals and natural environment of the Shiretoko Peninsula, in 1964 a great portion of the peninsula was designated Shiretoko National Park. Since then, the park has been subject to strict regulation as a nature preserve, and entering is prohibited.

== See also ==
- List of peninsulas
- Shiretoko Ryojō, a song about the Shiretoko Peninsula
- List of World Heritage Sites in Japan
