= Shiretoko National Park =

National Park in Shiretoko, Japan

- 知床国立公園
- IUCN category II (national park)
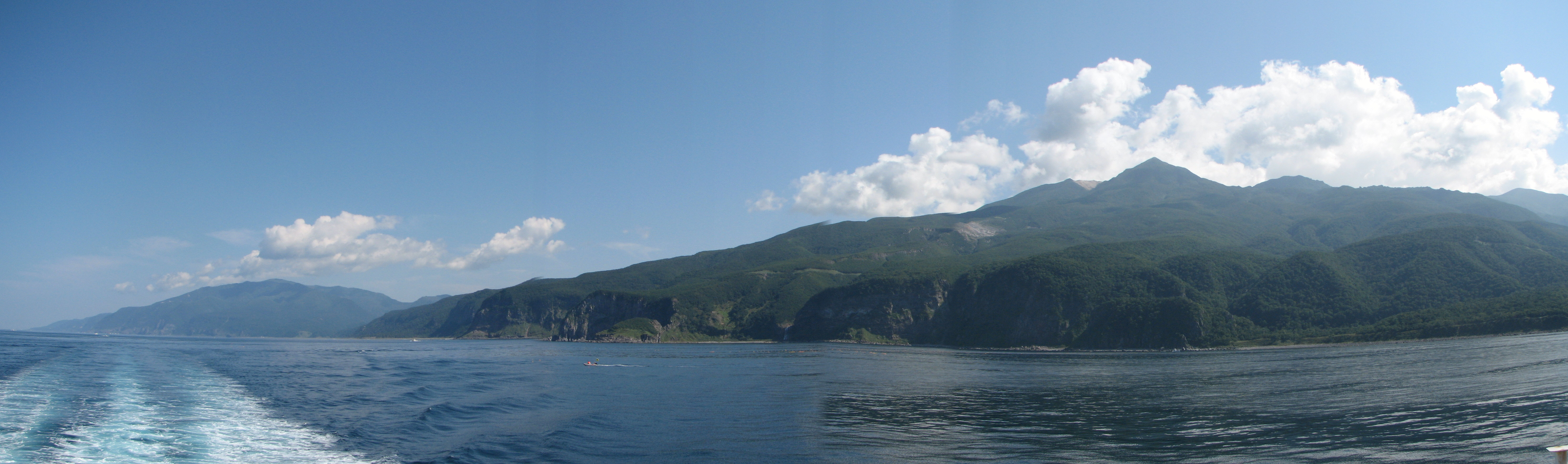
- View from the sea

- Location within Hokkaido Location within Japan
- Location: Okhotsk and Nemuro Subprefectures, Hokkaido, Japan
- Coordinates: 44°06′N 145°11′E
- Area: 386.36 km^{2} (149.17 sq mi)
- Established: June 1, 1964
- Governing body: Ministry of the Environment (Japan)

UNESCO World Heritage Site
- Official name: Shiretoko
- Type: Natural
- Criteria: ix, x
- Designated: 2005 (29th session)
- Reference no.: 1193
- Region: Asia-Pacific

Shiretoko National Park (知床国立公園, Shiretoko Kokuritsu Kōen) covers most of the Shiretoko Peninsula at the northeastern tip of the island of Hokkaido, Japan. The word "Shiretoko" is derived from an Ainu word "sir etok", meaning "the place where the earth protrudes".

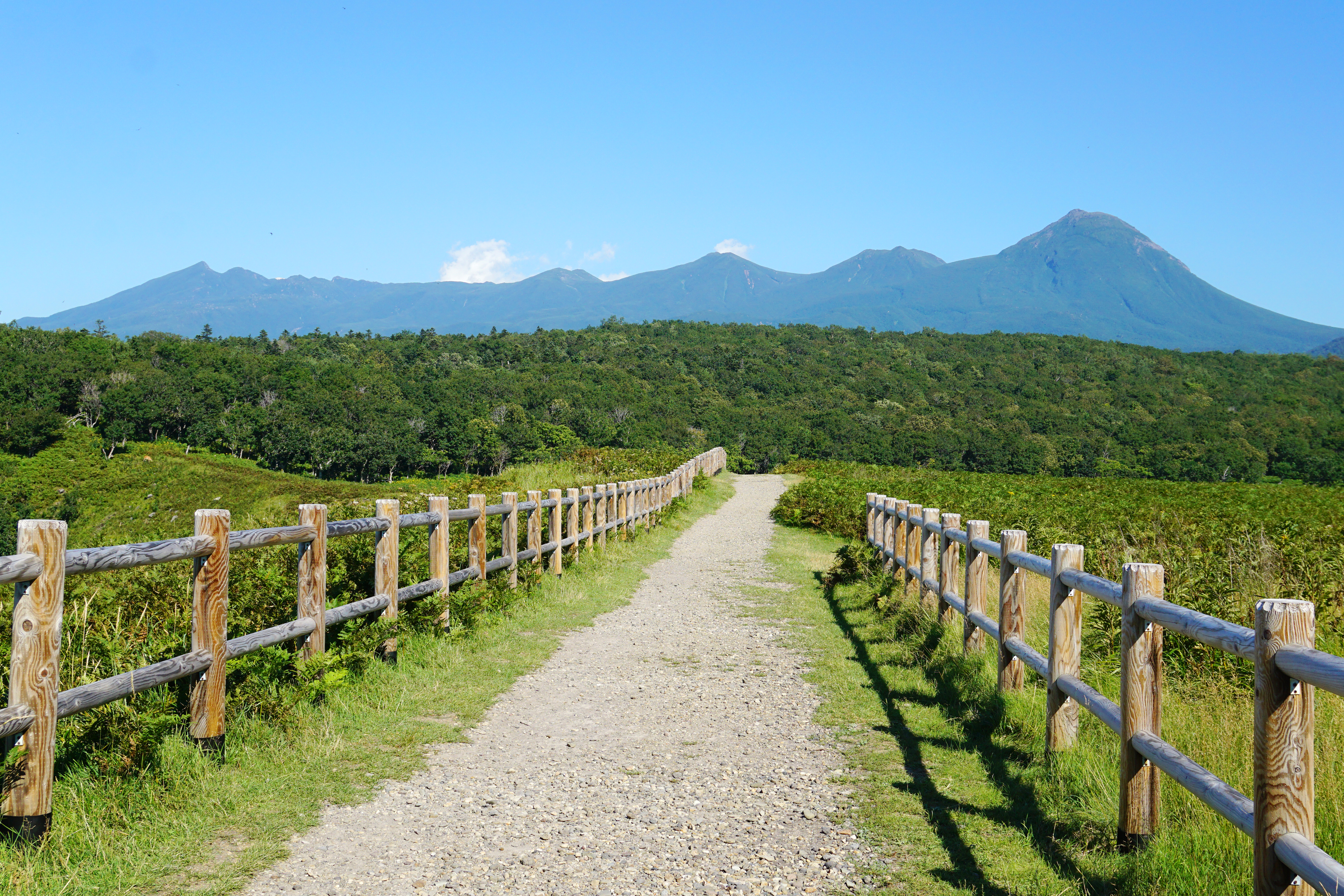
At "Track Near Furepe Falls" in Shari, Hokkaido prefecture, Japan. Furepe Falls and its circumference was registered as part of the UNESCO World Heritage Site "Shiretoko".

One of the most remote regions in Japan, the peninsula is accessible only on foot or by boat. Shiretoko is best known as the home of Japan's largest population of brown bears, and for offering views of Kunashiri Island, ownership of which Japan and Russia dispute. Shiretoko is also home to many birds, such as Steller's sea eagle and white-tailed eagle, and to marine animals such as spotted seal, orca whale, and sperm whale. The park has a hot springs waterfall called Kamuiwakka Falls (カムイワッカの滝, Kamuiwakka-no-taki). Kamui wakka means "water of the gods" in Ainu.

The forests of the park are temperate and subalpine mixed forests; the main tree species include Sakhalin fir (Abies sachalinensis), Erman's birch (Betula ermanii) and Mongolian oak (Quercus mongolica). Beyond the forest limit, there are impenetrable Siberian dwarf pine (Pinus pumila) thickets.

In 2005, UNESCO designated the area a World Heritage Site, advising to develop the property jointly with the Kuril Islands of Russia as a transboundary "World Heritage Peace Park". Shiretoko's listing as Natural Heritage was seen by the Indigenous Ainu as contradicting the long history of Ainu settlement in the park area.

The Shiretoko Park Nature Center is in Shari. It serves as the visitor center and includes a movie about the park, a restaurant, and a gift shop.

== Features ==
- Mount Rausu

== See also ==
- List of national parks of Japan
- List of World Heritage Sites in Japan
- Tourism in Japan
