= Mount Onnebetsu =

Quaternary stratovolcano on the island of Hokkaido in Japan

- 遠音別岳
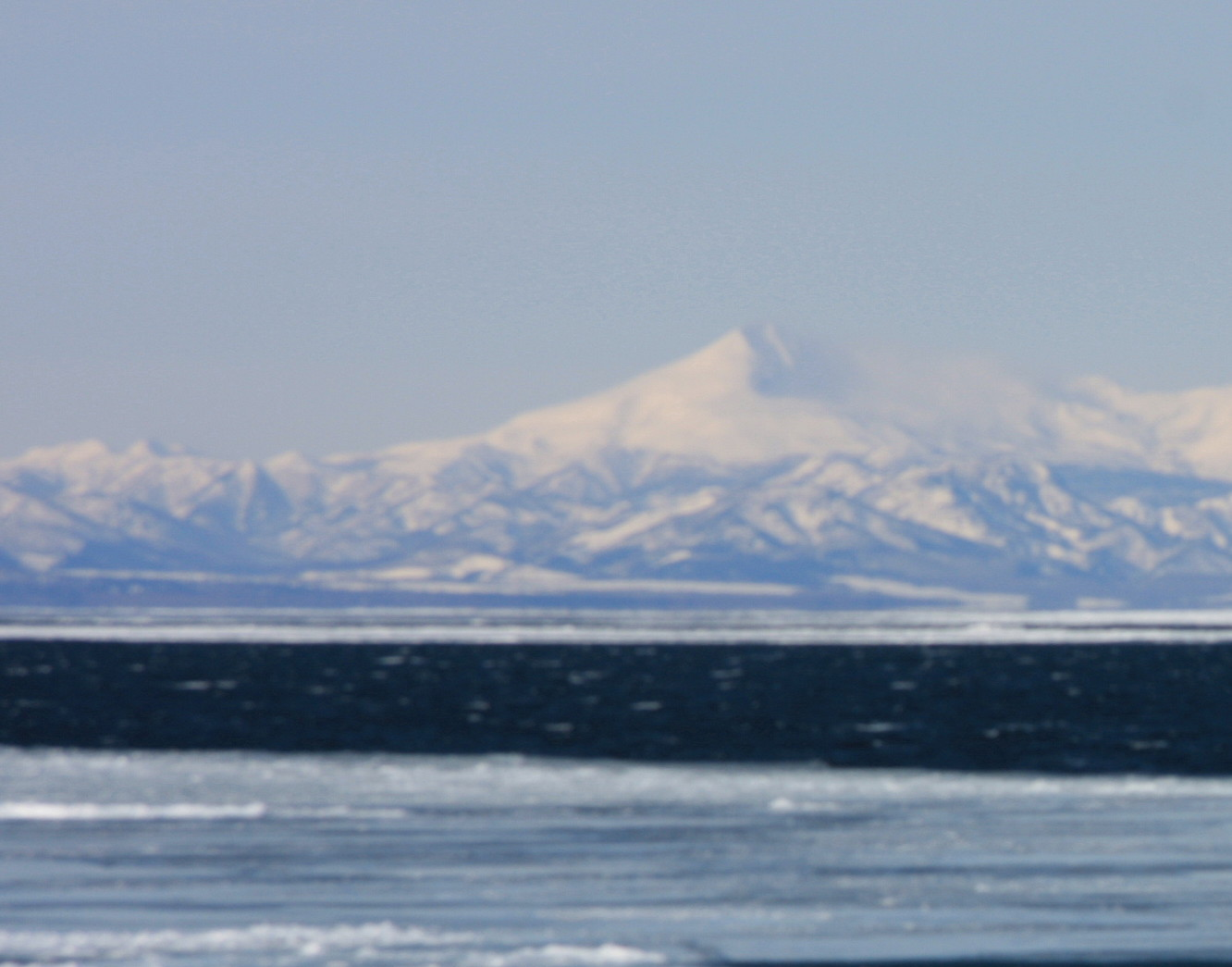
- Mount Onnebetsu

Highest point
- Elevation: 1,330.4 m (4,365 ft)
- Listing: List of mountains and hills of Japan by height
- Coordinates: 43°59′36″N 145°0′48″E

Geography
- Location within Japan
- Location: Hokkaido, Japan
- Parent range: Shiretoko Peninsula
- Topo map: Geospatial Information Authority of Japan 25000:1 遠音別岳; 25000:1 真鯉; 50000:1 斜里; 50000:1 標津

Geology
- Rock age: Quaternary
- Mountain type(s): Stratovolcano and Lava dome
- Volcanic arc: Kurile arc
- Last eruption: ca. 0.4–0.2 million years ago

Mount Onnebetsu (遠音別岳, Onnebetsu-dake) is a Quaternary stratovolcano. Its summit is 1,330.4 metres (4,365 ft) above sea level. It is located on Hokkaido's Shiretoko Peninsula on the border of Shari in Shari District, Okhotsk and Rausu in Menashi District, Nemuro.

== Geology ==
The mountain is made mainly of andesite.

== See also ==
- List of volcanoes in Japan
- List of mountains in Japan
