= Mount Higashi =

- Location within Hokkaido

Highest point
- Listing: List of mountains and hills of Japan by height
- Coordinates: 44°07′43.2″N 145°10′43.3″E

Geography
- Location: Hokkaido, Japan
- Parent range: Shiretoko Peninsula

Geology
- Rock age: Middle Pleistocene
- Mountain type: stratovolcano

Mount Higashi (東岳, Higashi-dake) is a volcano located on the Shiretoko Peninsula in Hokkaido, Japan.
