= List of stratovolcanoes =

A list of stratovolcanoes follows below.

== Africa ==
=== Cameroon ===
- Eboga stratovolcano
- Little Mount Cameroon
- Mount Cameroon
- Mount Oku

=== Democratic Republic of Congo ===
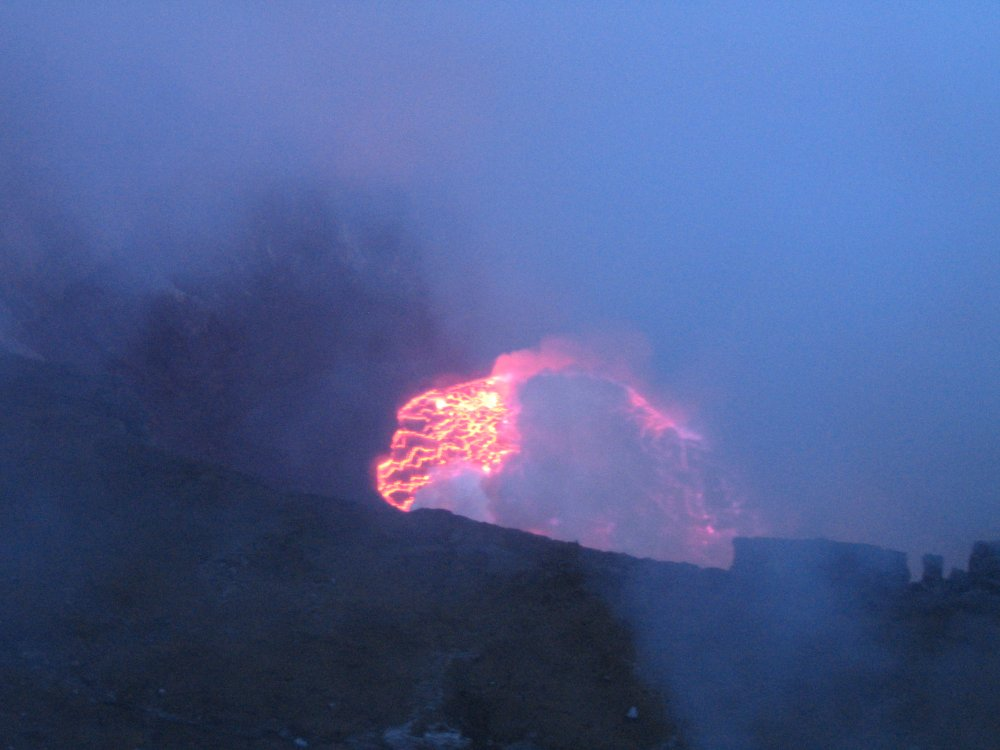
Lava lake inside Mount Nyiragongo

- Mount Nyiragongo, Goma; designated as a Decade Volcano
  - It contains an active lava lake inside its crater which overflowed due to cracks in 2002.
- Mount Mikeno
- Mount Karisimbi
- Mount Bisoke
- Mount Sabyinyo
- Mount Kahuzi

=== Eritrea ===
- Alid Volcano
- Dubbi Volcano
- Nabro Volcano

=== Ethiopia ===
- Adwa
- Aluto
- Borawli, Afar Region
- Mount Chilalo
- Dabbahu Volcano
- Mount Fentale

=== Kenya ===
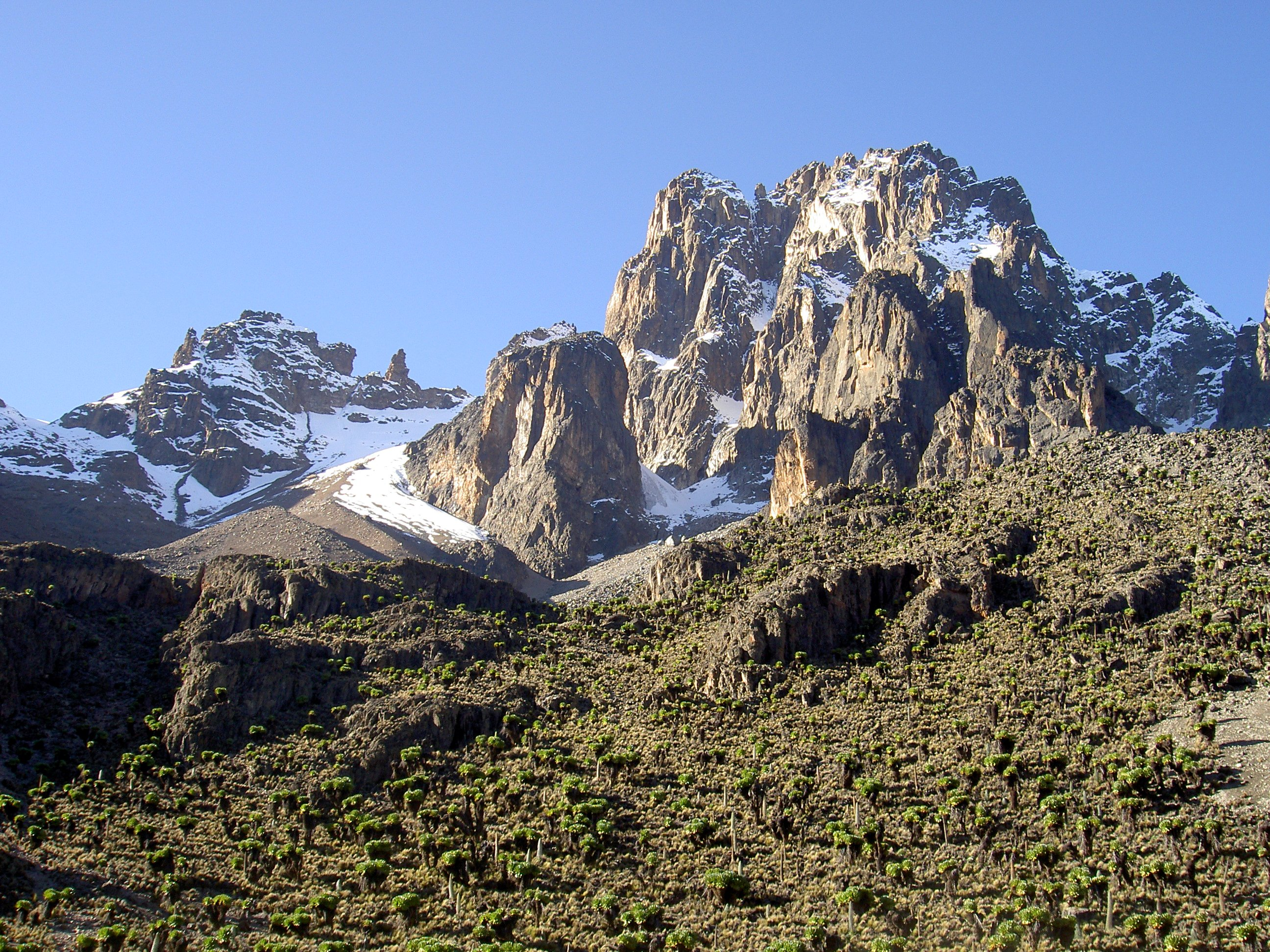
Mount Kenya in 2007

- Mount Kenya, which contains several volcanic plugs on its peak.
- Mount Longonot

=== Rwanda ===
- Mount Bisoke, on the border between Rwanda and the Democratic Republic of the Congo.
- Mount Gahinga, on the border between Rwanda and Uganda.
- Mount Karisimbi, on the border between Rwanda and the Democratic Republic of the Congo.
- Mount Muhabura, on the border between Rwanda and Uganda.
- Mount Sabyinyo, marks the border between Rwanda, Uganda, and the Democratic Republic of the Congo.

=== Tanzania ===
- Ol Doinyo Lengai, the Earth's only active carbonatite lava-producing volcano.
- Mount Kilimanjaro, a dormant stratovolcano. It is the highest point of Africa.
- Mount Meru
- Mount Hanang
- Mount Kwaraha
- Mount Rungwe

=== Atlantic Ocean ===
- Mount Pico in Pico Island, Azores, Portugal
- Teide in Tenerife, Canary Islands, Spain; designated as a Decade Volcano
- Cumbre Vieja in La Palma, Canary Islands, Spain
- Mount Fogo in Fogo, Cape Verde
- Green Mountain, Ascension Island
- Pico de las Nieves in Gran Canaria, Canary Islands, Spain

== Americas ==
=== Caribbean ===
- La Grande Soufrière on Basse-Terre Island, Guadeloupe
- Soufriere Hills on the island Montserrat
  - Its 1995 eruptions resulted in the abandonment of its capital city, Plymouth.
- Soufrière on the island Saint Vincent
- Mount Pelée on the island Martinique
  - Its devastating eruption on 8 May 1902 resulted in the complete destruction of its capital city, Saint-Pierre, with the deaths of more than 30,000 inhabitants within it.
- Mount Liamuiga on the island of Saint Kitts in St. Kitts and Nevis.
- Nevis Peak on the island of Nevis in St. Kitts and Nevis.
- Mount Scenery on the island Saba in the Caribbean Netherlands
- The Quill on the island Sint Eustatius in the Caribbean Netherlands

=== Central America ===
==== Costa Rica ====
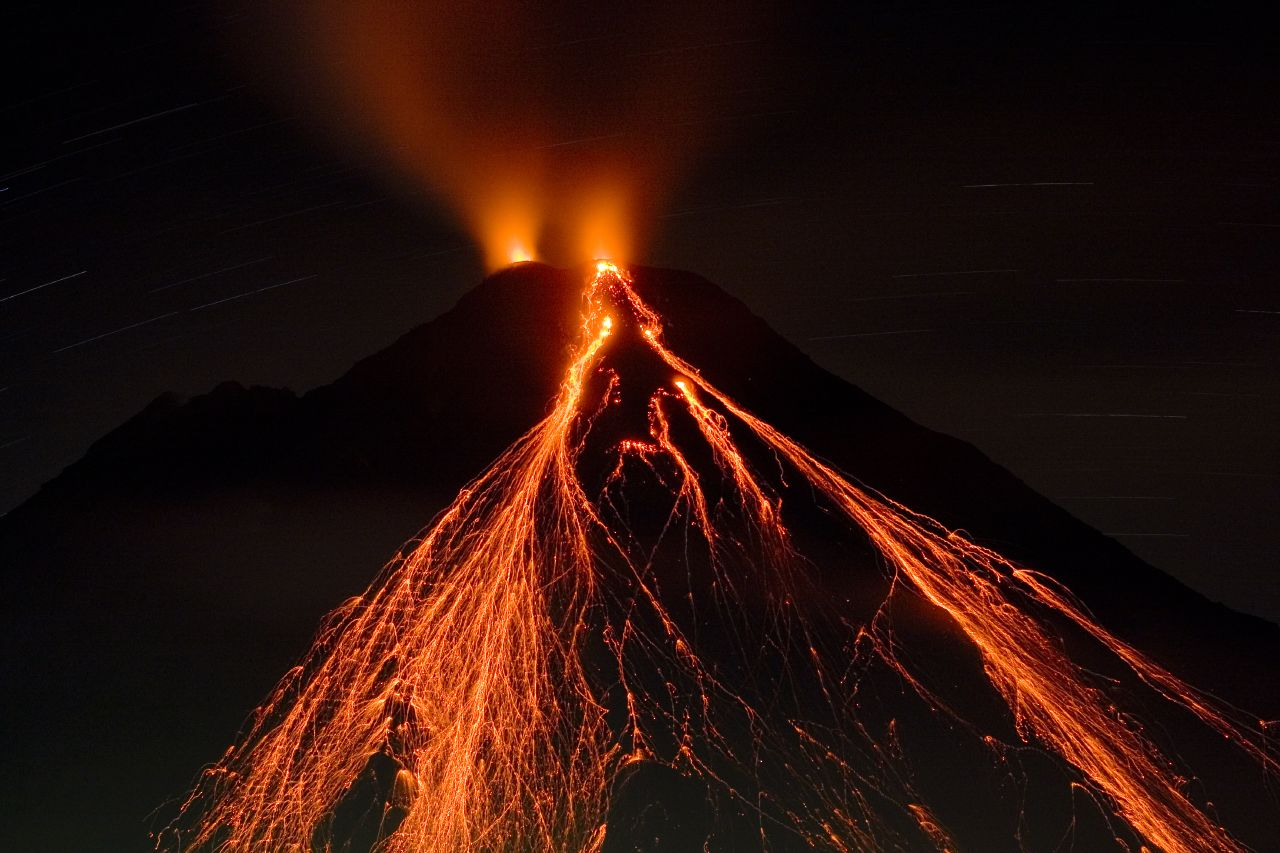
Arenal Volcano in November 2006

- Orosi
- Rincón de la vieja
- Miravalles
- Tenorio
- Arenal
- Chato
- Platanar
- Congo
- Poás
- Barva
- Cacho Negro
- Irazu
- Turrialba

==== El Salvador ====
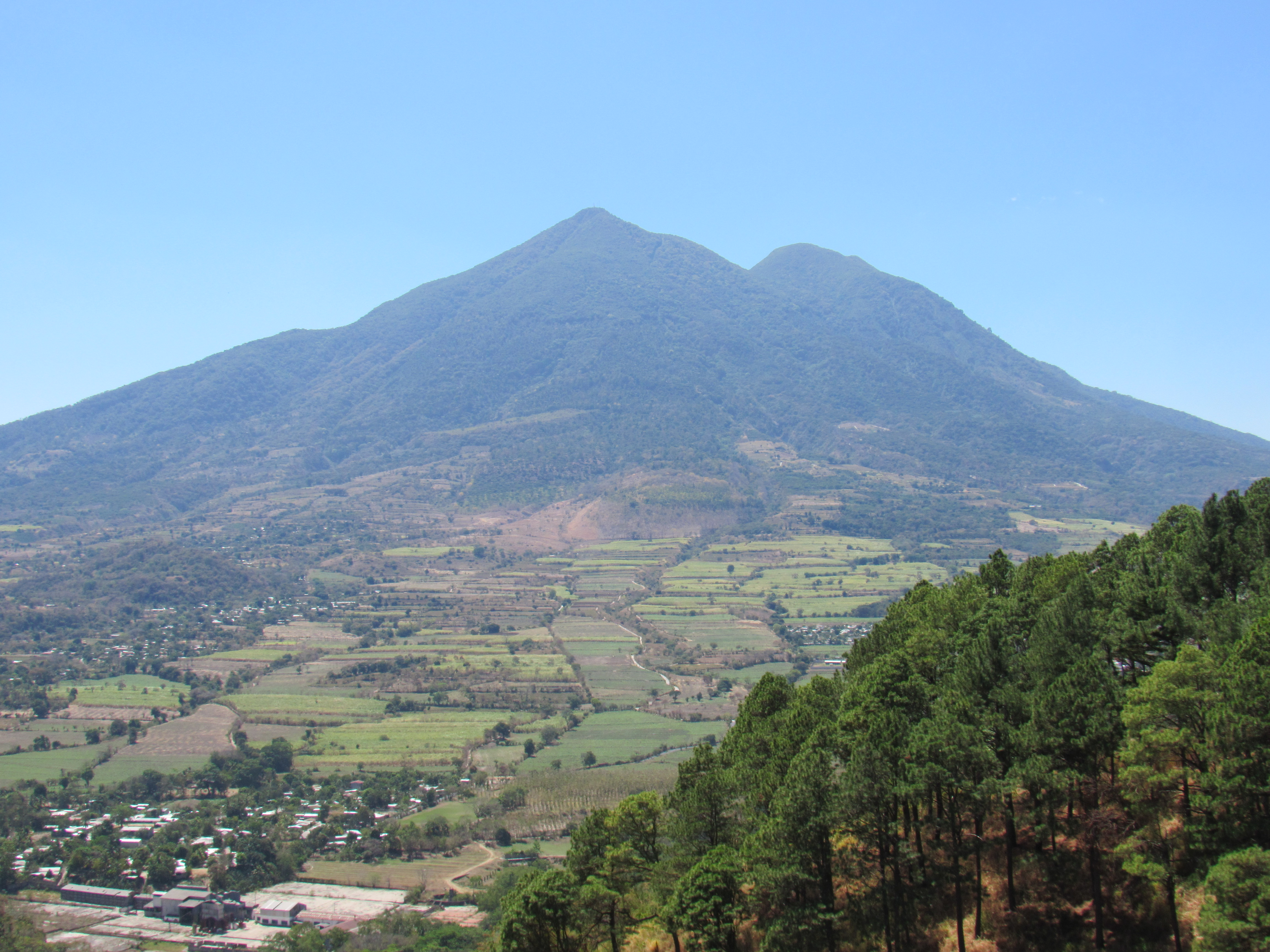
San Vicente in 1994

- San Miguel
- Chinameca
- Santa Ana
- Chichontepec
- Guazapa
- Taburete
- Izalco

==== Honduras ====
- Isla Zacate Grande
- Tiger Island

==== Guatemala ====
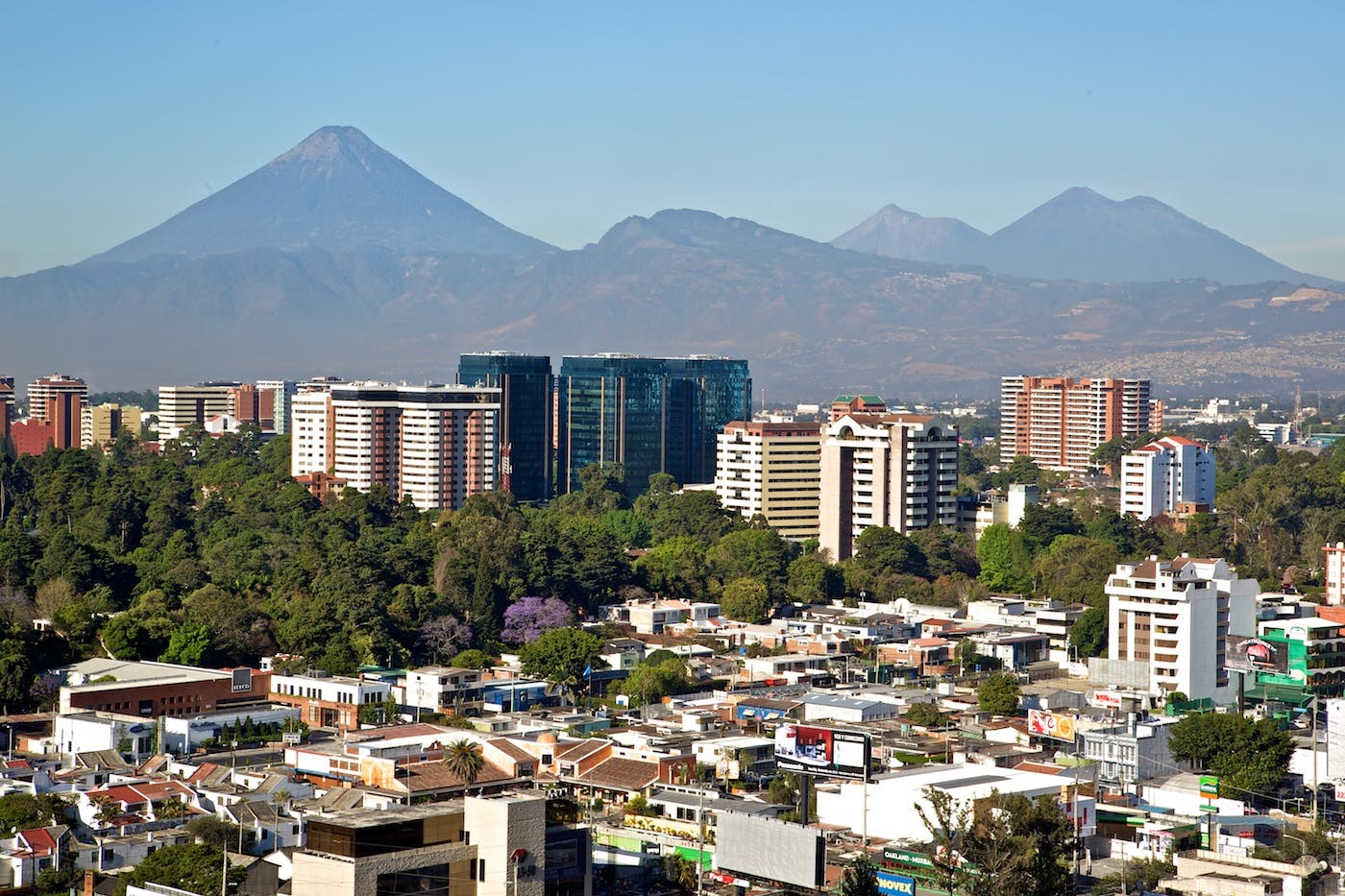
(From left to right) Agua, Fuego, and Acatenango volcanoes, taken from Guatemala City.

- Volcán Tacaná on the border between Mexico and Guatemala
- Volcán Tajumulco
  - It is the highest point and highest volcano in Central America
- Volcán Cerro Quemado (Almolonga)
- Volcán Santa María; designated a Decade Volcano.
  - It has a smaller peak called Santiaguito.
- Volcán Siete Orejas
- Volcán San Pedro
- Volcán Atitlán
- Volcán Tolimán
- Acatenango
- Volcán de Fuego.
  - It erupted in June 2018.
- Volcán de Agua
- Pacaya
- Tecuamburro
- Tahual
- Volcán Jumay
- Volcán Ipala
- Suchitán
- Volcán Moyuta
- Volcán Chingo on the border between Guatemala and El Salvador

==== Nicaragua ====
- Concepción
- Cosigüina
- Mombacho
- Momotombo
- Rota
- San Cristóbal Volcano
- Telica

==== Panama ====
- Volcán Barú
- El Valle
- La Yeguada

=== North America ===
==== Canada ====
===== Northwest Territories/Nunavut =====
- Back River volcanic complex

===== Yukon =====
- Montana Mountain
- Mount Nansen (Yukon)

===== Northern British Columbia =====
- Hoodoo Mountain
- Mount Edziza
- Mount Edziza volcanic complex
- Ice Peak
- Spectrum Range
- Level Mountain
- Level Mountain Range

===== Southern British Columbia =====
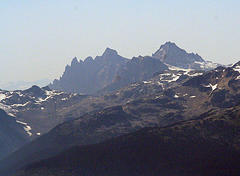
The Mount Cayley volcanic complex on August 13, 2005. Summits left to right are Pyroclastic Peak and Mount Cayley.

- Mount Boucherie
- Mount Cayley (see also Mount Cayley volcanic field)
- Mount Fee
  - It is most likely a dissected stratovolcano.
- Mount Garibaldi
- Mount Meager massif
  - About 2,400 years ago, it produced the most recent major catastrophic eruption in Canada.
- Capricorn Mountain
- Mount Job
- Plinth Peak
- Pylon Peak (British Columbia)
- Tuber Hill
- Mount Price
- Clinker Peak
- The Black Tusk
- Coquihalla Mountain

==== Mexico ====
- Popocatépetl, 70 km (43 mi) southeast of Mexico City
- Colima; designated as a Decade Volcano
- Nevado de Toluca
- Pico de Orizaba

==== United States ====
===== Alaska =====
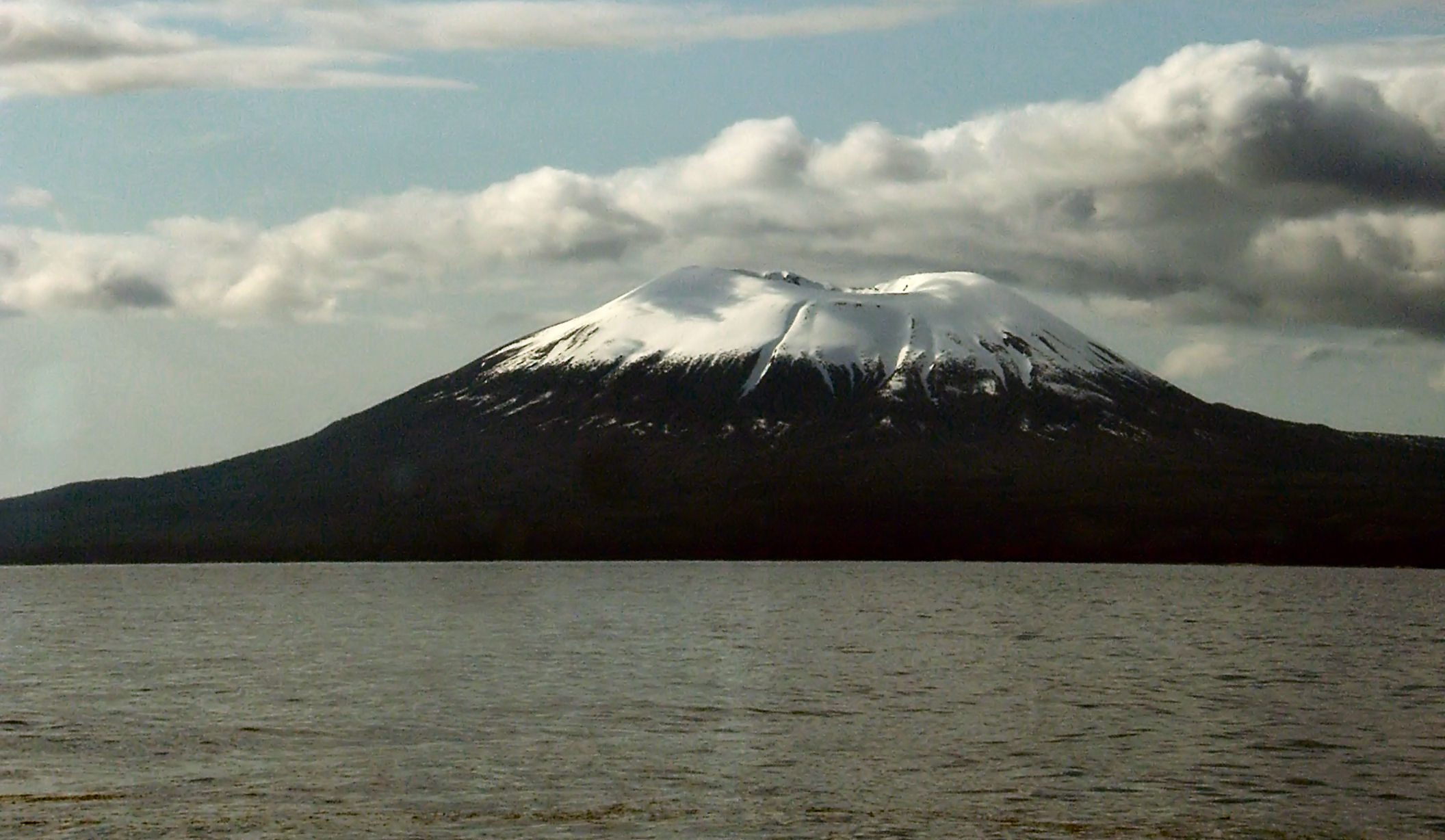
Mount Edgecumbe, near Sitka, Alaska

- Mount Akutan
- Augustine Volcano
- Mount Bona
- Mount Churchill
- Mount Cleveland
- Mount Edgecumbe
- Frosty Peak Volcano
- Hayes Volcano
- Mount Katmai
- Korovin Volcano
- Mount Mageik
- Mount Martin
- Mount Pavlof
- Pavlof Sister
- Mount Redoubt
- Mount Shishaldin
- Mount Spurr
- Mount Vsevidof

===== Washington (state) =====
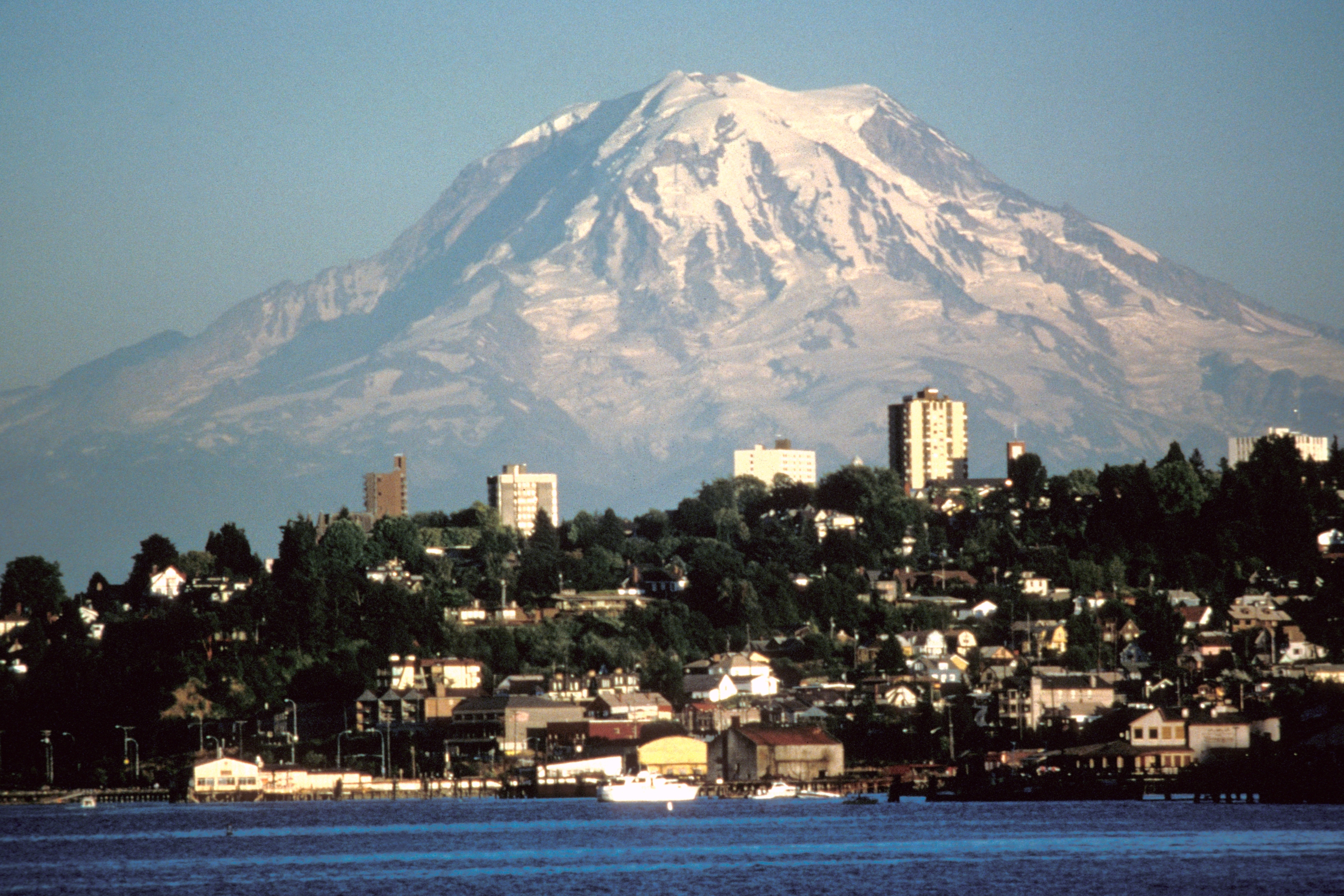
Northwest side of Mount Rainier seen from Tacoma

- Mount Baker
- Glacier Peak
- Mount Rainier; designated as a Decade Volcano
- Mount St. Helens
  - On May 18, 1980, it produced a large eruption preceded by a massive landslide which decimated the volcano's height.
- Mount Adams
- Goat Rocks
- Black Buttes
- Colfax Peak
- Lincoln Peak
- Seward Peak
- Signal Peak
- Mount Daniel
- Mount Hinman
- Cathedral Rock (Washington)

===== Oregon =====
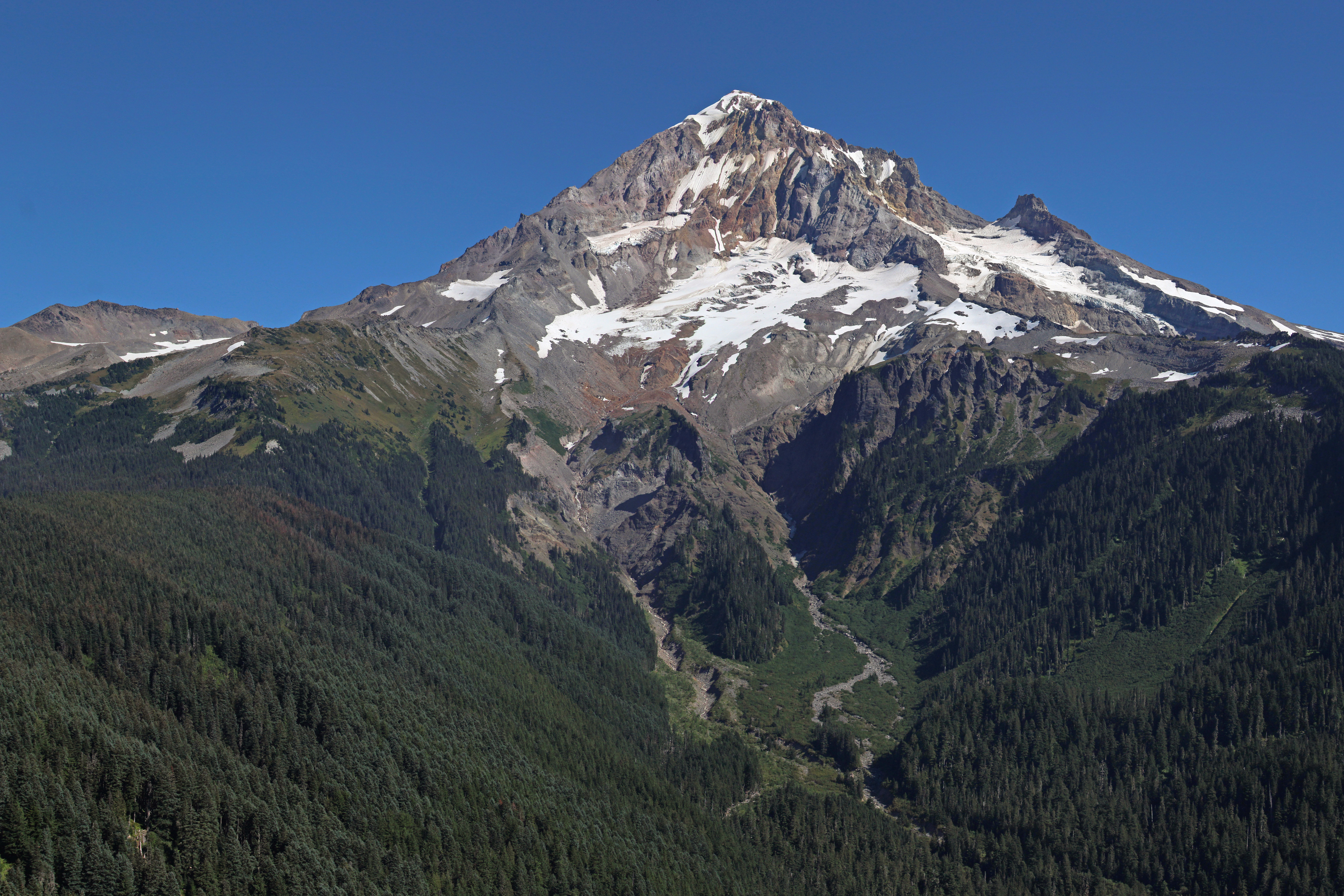
Mount Hood, 2017

- Mount Hood
  - Mount Hood is Oregon's most active volcano.
- Mount Jefferson
- Castle Rocks
- Black Butte
- Mount Washington
  - It is debatably a stratovolcano. It is most confirmed to be a shield volcano.
- The Three Sisters
- Middle Sister
- South Sister
- The Husband
- The Wife
- Broken Top
- Mount Bachelor
- Newberry Volcano
  - Also has the characteristics of a shield volcano.
- Diamond Peak (Oregon)
  - Usually referred to as a shield volcano. However, it has a stratocone.
- Cappy Mountain
- Mount Mazama
  - Over 7,000 years ago, Mount Mazama erupted, causing its original edifice to be turned into a caldera instead.
- Mount Scott (Klamath County, Oregon)
- Hillman Peak
  - Hillman Peak's west half collapsed in the Mount Mazama eruption over 7,000 years ago.
- Sentinel Rock
- Danger Bay
- Dutton Cliff
- Phantom Ship
- Mount McLoughlin
- Rattlesnake Creek
  - This stratovolcano was a proto-Cascade Range volcano east of Burns, Oregon.

===== California =====
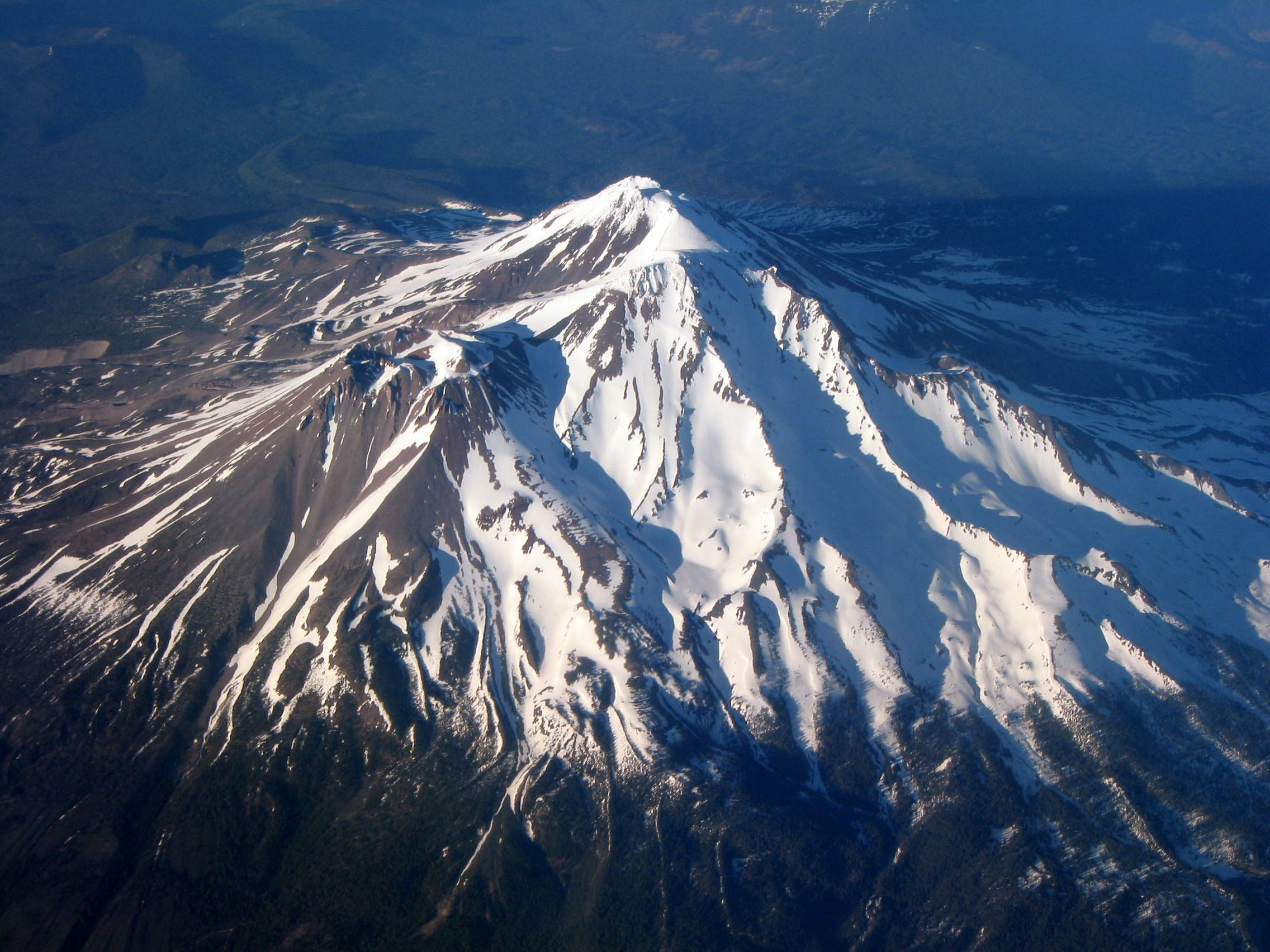
Mount Shasta from the air

- Mount Shasta
- Shastina
- Burney Mountain
- Magee Peak
- Lassen volcanic area
- Snow Mountain
- Mount Yana
- Mount Maidu
- Mount Dittmar
- Mount Tehama

===== Nevada =====
- Cleopatra Peak
- Hamblin Peak

===== Utah =====
- Mount Belknap
- Monroe Peak

===== Colorado =====
- Summer Coon
- Guffey volcanic center

===== Wyoming =====
- Mount Washburn
- Eagle Peak (Wyoming)
- Sunlight Peak (Wyoming)

===== Arizona =====
- Mohon Peak
- San Francisco Mountain
  - Humphreys Peak
  - Agassiz Peak
  - Fremont Peak
  - Aubineau Peak
  - Rees Peak
  - Doyle Peak
- Mount Baldy

===== New Mexico =====
- Mount Taylor
- Sierra Blanca (New Mexico)

===== Virginia =====
- Battle Mountain (Virginia)

===== New Hampshire =====
- Ossipee Mountains

=== South America ===
==== Chile ====
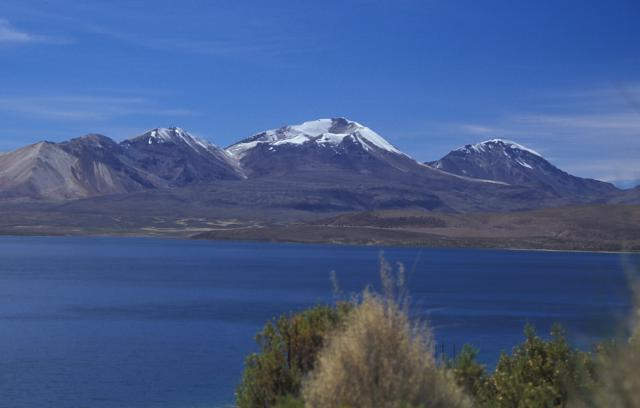
A view of Acotango from Chungará Lake

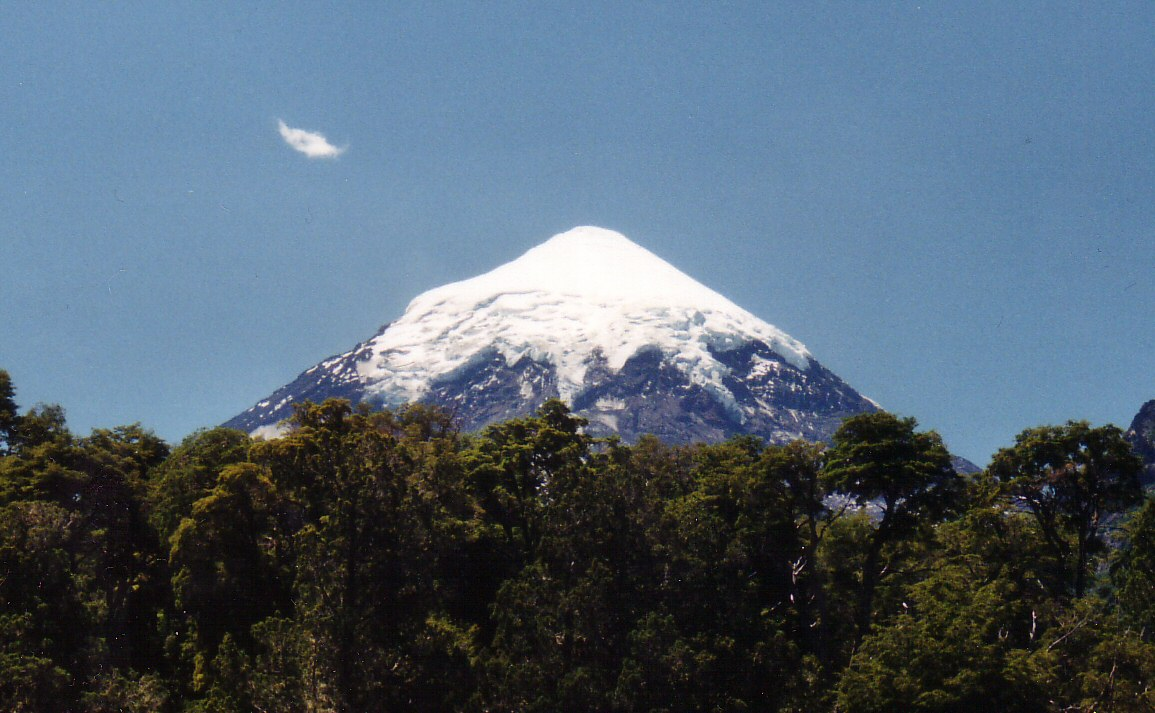
Lanín, January 1997

- Llaima
- Irruputuncu on the border of Bolivia and Chile
- Ojos del Salado on the border between Argentina and Chile
  - It is the highest volcano in the world.
- Villarrica
- Osorno
- Cerro Arenales
- Calbuco
  - It erupted in April 2015.
- Callaqui
- Mount Hudson
- Copahue
- Lascar Volcano
- Nevados de Chillán
- Lanín on the border between Argentina and Chile
- Acotango on the border between Bolivia and Chile
- Cerro Solo on the border between Chile and Argentina
- Parinacota
  - It erupted in April 2008
- Licancabur
- Reclus
- Sierra Nevada
- Chaitén
- Acamarachi
- Marmolejo
  - It is the southernmost mountain with more than 6000 msmm
- San José
- Plantat

==== Colombia ====
- Galeras; designated a Decade Volcano.
- Nevado del Ruiz
  - A 1985 eruption created destructive lahar floods which engulfed the nearby town of Armero.

==== Ecuador ====
- Pichincha Volcano
- Tungurahua
- Sangay
- Reventador
- Chimborazo
- Cotopaxi
- Antisana
- Cayambe
- Corazón
- El Altar
- Carihuairazo

==== Peru ====
- Coropuna
- Huaynaputina
- El Misti
- Sabancaya
- Ubinas
- Tutupaca
- Yucamane

== Antarctica ==
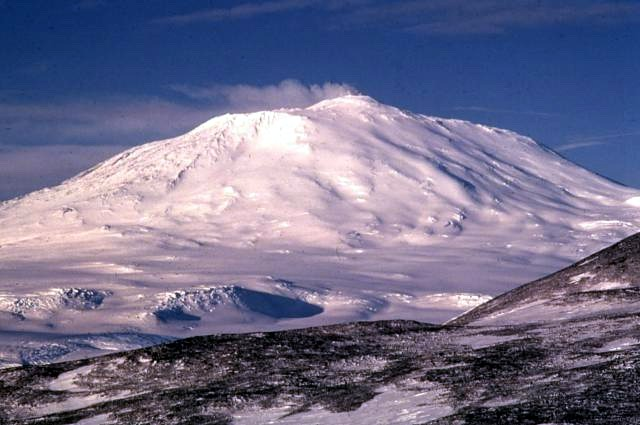
Mount Erebus

- Mount Erebus
- Penguin Island
- Mount Bird
- Brown Peak
- Mount Discovery
- Mount Vernon Harcourt
- Mount Melbourne
- Mount Morning
- Mount Overlord

== Asia ==
=== Western Asia ===
==== Iran ====
- Bazman
- Sahand
- Sabalan
- Mount Damavand
- Taftan Volcano

==== Turkey ====
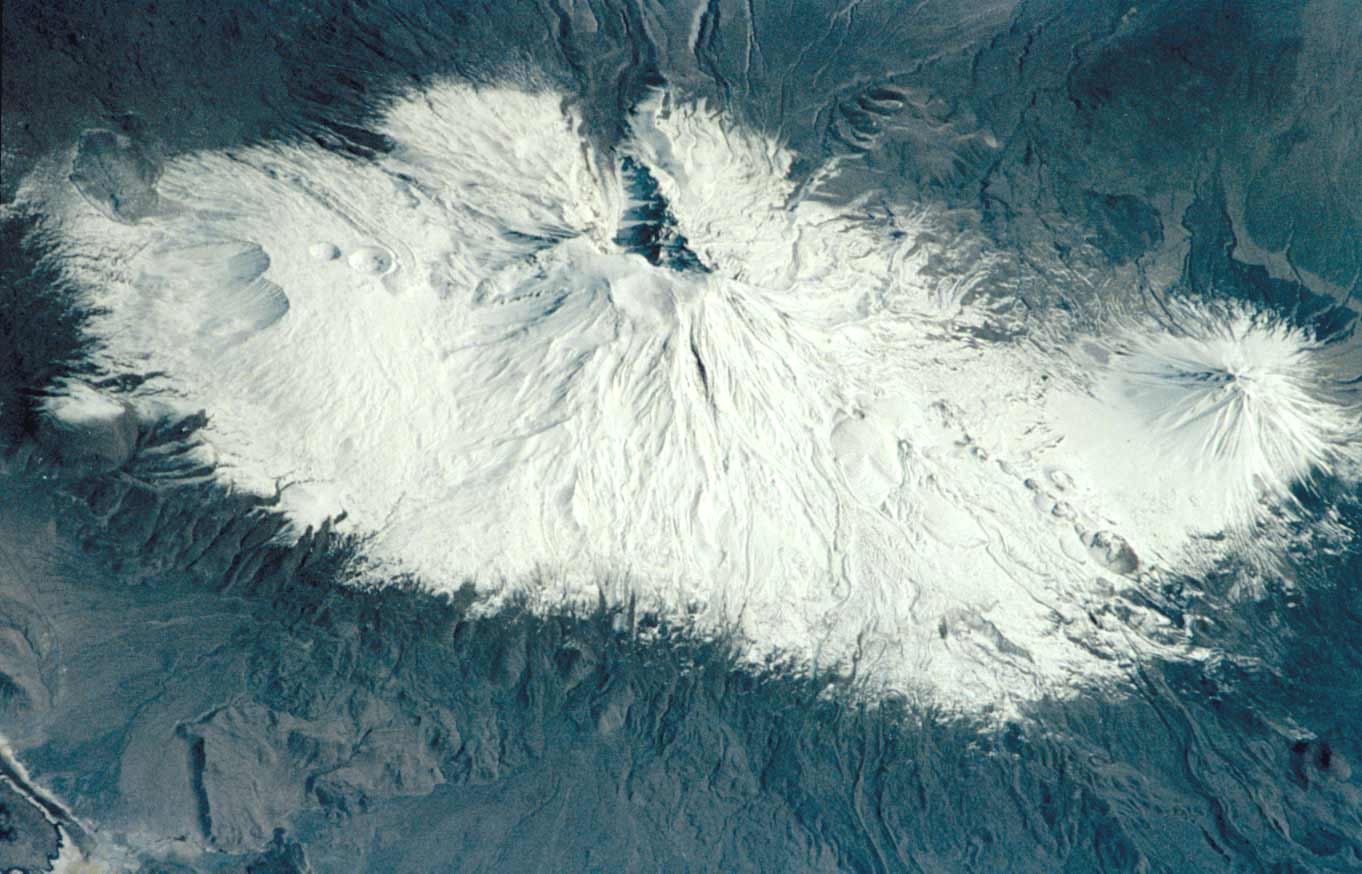
Photo of Mount Ararat (ağri dağı) seen from space

- Mount Hasan
- Mount Ararat and Little Ararat
- Mount Erciyes
- Mount süphan

==== Yemen ====
- Jabal al-Tair, an island within the Red Sea

=== South Asia ===
==== India ====
- Barren Island
  - It is the only active stratovolcano in the Indian subcontinent
- Narcondam Island

=== Southeast Asia ===
==== Indonesia ====
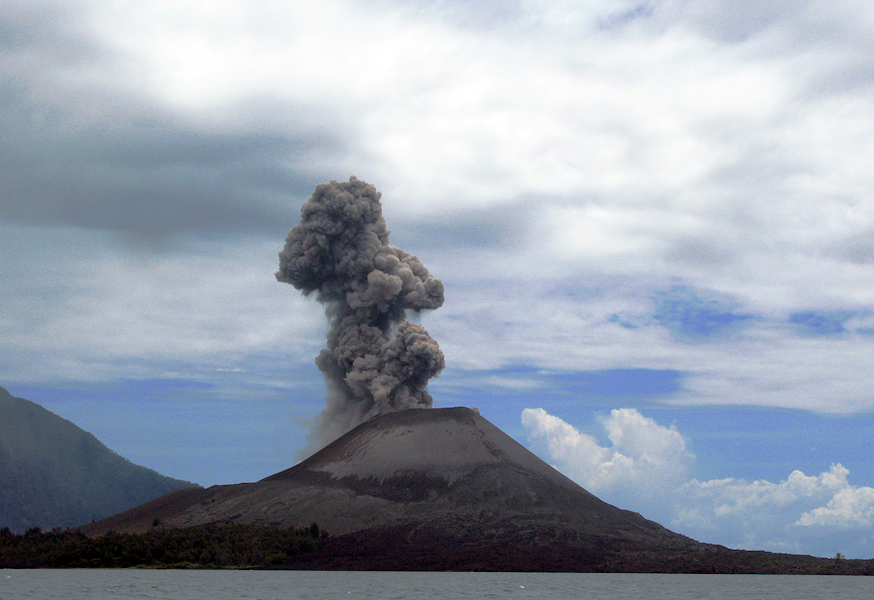
Volcanic activity at Anak Krakatau

- Mount Kerinci and Mount Sinabung in Sumatra
- Mount Lawu in Central Java
- Mount Muria in Central Java
- Mount Rinjani in Lombok
- Mount Ruang in North Sulawesi, located in the Sitaro Islands Regency
- Mount Semeru and Mount Bromo in East Java. Together, they form the Bromo Tengger Semeru National Park.
- Mount Agung and Mount Batur in Bali
- Galunggung in West Java.
- Krakatoa. A violent eruption in August 1883 resulted in the obliteration of the three-peaked volcanic island.
  - Anak Krakatoa. It emerged from the sea in 1927–1930
- Mount Merapi in Central Java. It is listed as a Decade Volcano.
- Mount Tambora on the island of Sumbawa. Its catastrophic eruption in 1815 caused a Year Without a Summer in 1816.
- Mount Kelud in East Java
- Mount Wilis in Central Java

==== Malaysia ====
- Bombalai Hill in Sabah, Borneo

==== Myanmar ====
- Mount Popa in Kyaukpadaung Township, Nyaung-U District

==== Philippines ====
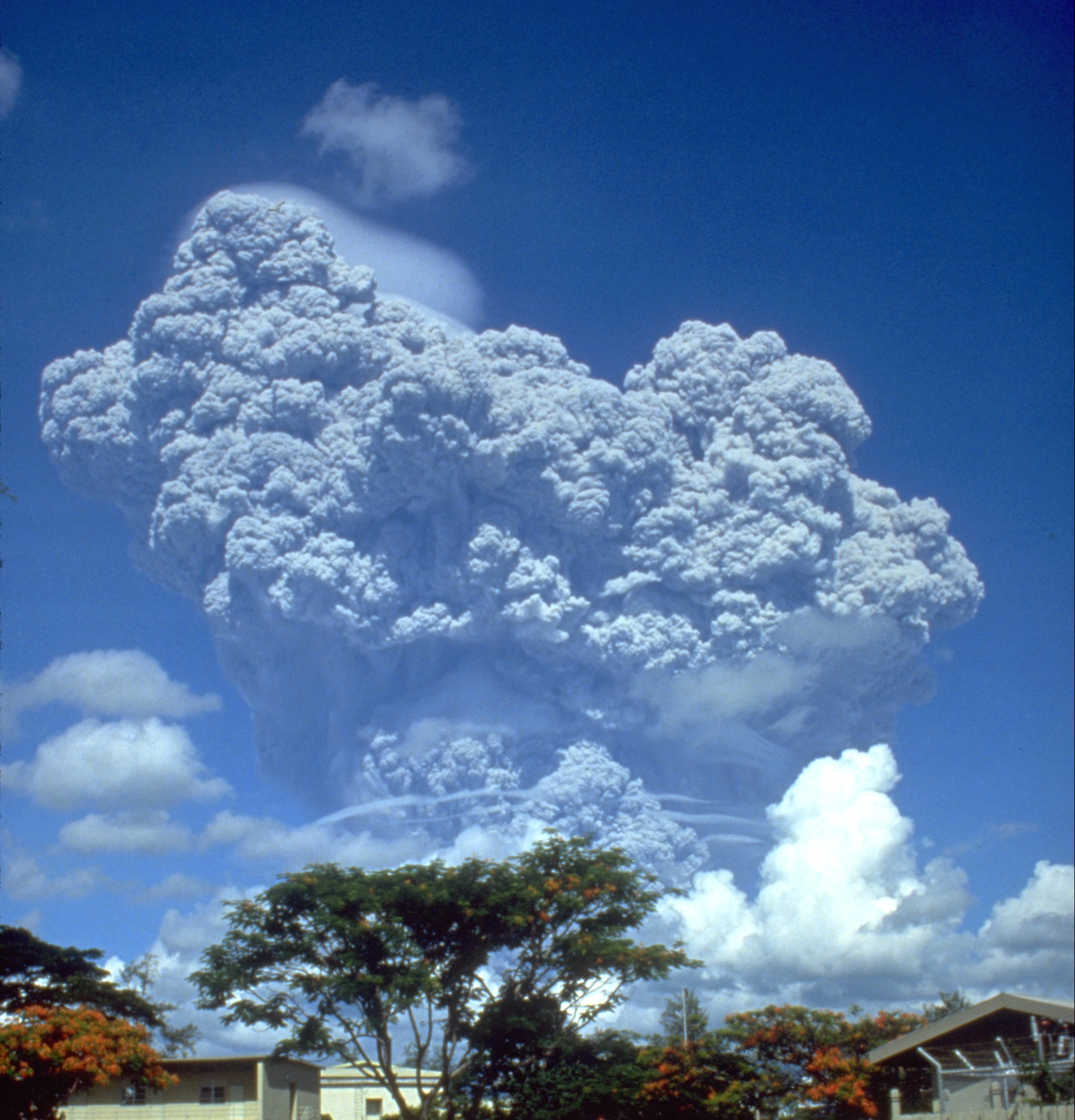
Ash plume of Mount Pinatubo during the June 1991 eruption

- Mayon Volcano in Albay, The most active volcano in the Philippines, famous for its perfect symmetrical cone shape.
- Mount Pinatubo in Zambales. The catastrophic June 1991 eruption, which formed a caldera, later filled by a crater lake, had global environmental effects.
- Mount Bulusan in Sorsogon
- Mount Kanlaon and Mount Talinis in Negros
- Mount Arayat in Pampanga
- Mount Iriga and Mount Isarog in Camarines Sur
- Mount Mariveles and Mount Natib in Bataan
- Mount Malindig in Marinduque
- Mount Apo in Davao City, Mindanao. Considered a dormant volcano, it is the highest point of the Philippines
- Mount Makiling in Laguna
- Mount Banahaw in Quezon is one of the active volcanoes in the Philippines. Its 1730 eruption caused a debris avalanche and crater lake collapse which flooded Sariaya, Quezon.

=== East Asia ===
==== North Korea ====
- Baekdu Mountain, on the border between North Korea and China

==== Japan ====
===== Akita Prefecture =====
- Mount Akita-Komagatake (part of the volcano lies within Iwate Prefecture)

===== Aomori Prefecture =====
- Hakkōda Mountains
- Mount Iwaki

===== Fukushima Prefecture =====
- Mount Adatara
- Mount Azuma-kofuji
- Mount Bandai

===== Gunma Prefecture =====
- Mount Haruna

===== Hokkaido =====
- Mount Aka (Daisetsuzan)
- Asahi-dake
- Mount Biei
- Biei Fuji
- Mount Chienbetsu
- Mount Chinishibetsu
- Mount Chisenupuri
- Mount Chūbetsu
- Mount Dokkarimui
- Mount E
- Mount Eboshi
- Mount Eniwa
- Mount Fuppushi
- Mount Furano
- Mount Hakodate
- Mount Higashi
- Mount Hokkaido-Komagatake
  - An active volcano with 50 recorded eruptions.
- Mount Iō (Shiretoko)
- Mount Iwanai
- Mount Iwaonupuri
- Mount Izari
- Mount Kamui (Lake Mashū caldera)
- Mount Koizumi
- Kojima
- Mount Konbu
  - It most likely is a stratovolcano.
- Mount Kuma
- Mount Maru (Esan)
- Mount Maru (Kamishihoro-Shintoku)
- Mount Mekunnai
- Mount Minami
- Mount Nagayama
- Mount Nipesotsu
- Mount Niseko-Annupuri
  - This volcano is the namesake of the Niseko Volcanic Group.
- Mount Nitonupuri
- Mount Okkabake
- Mount Onnebetsu
- Mount Oputateshike
- Mount Poromoi
- Mount Raiden
  - This andesitic volcano is the namesake of the Mount Raiden Volcanic Group.
- Mount Rausu
- Mount Rishiri
- Mount Rusha
- Mount Samakke Nupuri
- Mount Sashirui
- Mount Shakanuge
- Mount Shari
- Mount Shibetsu
- Mount Shirakaba
- Mount Shiretoko
- Mount Tarumae
- Mount Tokachi (Daisetsuzan)
- Mount Tomuraushi (Daisetsuzan)
- Mount Unabetsu
- Mount Usu
- Mount Waisuhorun
- Mount Yokotsu
  - An old, Pleistocene stratovolcano southeast of the more active and most likely younger Hokkaido Koma-ga-take. Yokotsu has a flank vent on its east to southeast side.
- Mount Yōtei

===== Iwate Prefecture =====
- Mount Iwate

===== Kagoshima Prefecture =====
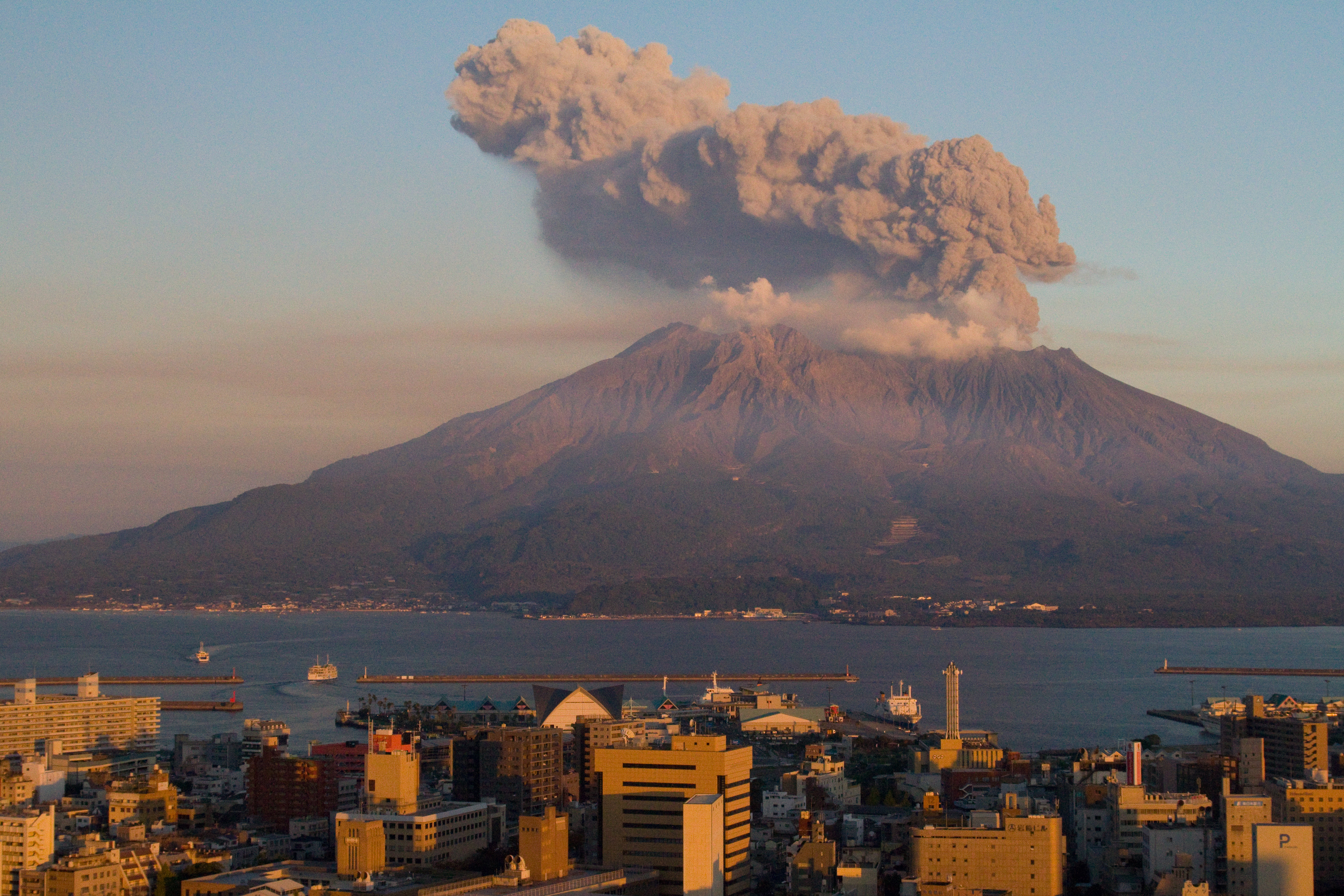
An eruption of Sakurajima in March 2009

- Akusekijima
- Mount Iō
- Mount Kaimon
- Mount Kirishima
- Kogajajima
- Kuchinoerabu-jima
- Nakanoshima
- Otake
- Sakurajima, designated as a Decade Volcano
- Shinmoedake
- Suwanosejima
- Yokoate-jima

===== Kumamoto Prefecture =====
- Mount Aso
  - This volcano is the largest in Japan.
- Mount Kinbō

===== Miyagi Prefecture =====
- Mount Funagata

===== Miyazaki Prefecture =====
- Mount Ōkueyama

===== Nagano Prefecture =====
- Mount Naeba (peak is shared with Niigata Prefecture)
- Mount Asama

===== Nagasaki Prefecture =====
- Mount Unzen. Erupted in 1991. Listed as a Decade Volcano

===== Niigata Prefecture =====
- Mount Myōkō
- Mount Naeba (peak is shared with Nagano Prefecture)

===== Ōita Prefecture =====
- Mount Heiji
- Mount Hōsshō
- Mount Inahoshi
- Mount Kujū
- Mount Mimata
- Mount Nakadake
- Mount North Taisen
- Mount Taisen
- Mount Waita
- Mount Yufu

===== Shimane Prefecture =====
- Mount Sanbe
  - Also known by its Japanese name as Sanbesan, this scenic volcano last erupted in 650 AD and will likely erupt again somewhere in the future.

===== Shizuoka Prefecture =====
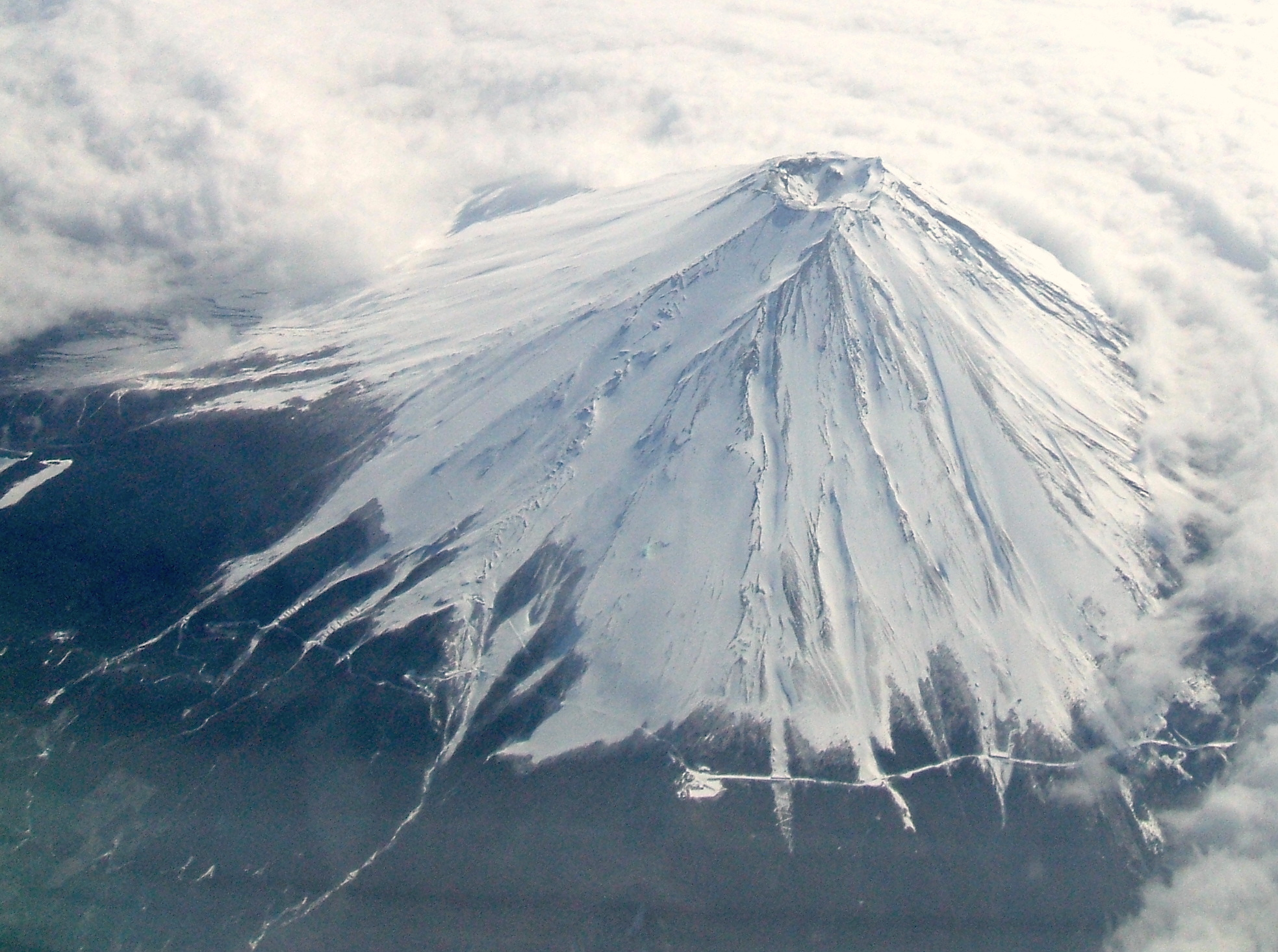
Peak of Mount Fuji

- Mount Fuji (peak is shared with Yamanashi Prefecture) Highest point of the country. Last erupted in 1708
- Mount Ashitaka
- Mount Echizen-dake
  - This vent is a peak of the Ashitaka volcano.

===== Tochigi Prefecture =====
- Mount Nantai

===== Tokyo =====
- Mount Mihara on Izu Ōshima
- Miyake-jima

===== Tottori Prefecture =====
- Mount Daisen

===== Yamagata Prefecture =====
- Mount Chōkai (part of the volcano lies within Akita Prefecture)
- Mount Goshō

===== Yamanashi Prefecture =====
- Mount Fuji (peak is shared with Shizuoka Prefecture)

==== Taiwan ====
- Guishan Island

=== Northern Asia ===
==== Russia ====
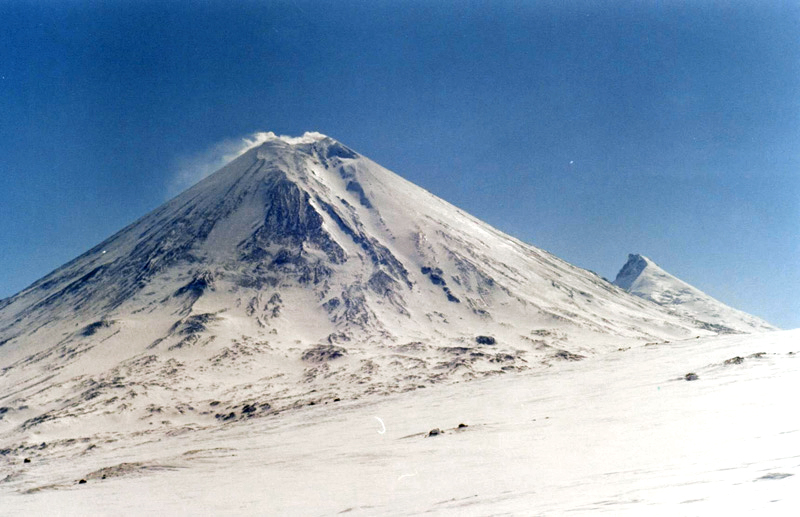
Klyuchevskaya Sopka in July 2006

- Bezymianny
- Klyuchevskaya Sopka or Kliuchevskoi, Kamchatka Krai, the highest active volcano in Eurasia
- Shiveluch, Kamchatka Krai
- Avachinsky, Kamchatka Krai, a Decade Volcano
- Koryaksky, Kamchatka Krai, also a Decade Volcano
- Karymsky, Kamchatka Krai
- Alaid, Atlasov Island, Kuril Islands, Sakhalin oblast
- Mount Elbrus in the Caucasus. It is the highest point in the European continent.

== Europe ==
=== Central Europe ===
==== Slovakia ====
- Bogota, in Košice and Prešov.
- Makovica, in Košice and Prešov.
- Štiavnica, in Banská Bystrica.
- Poľana, in Banská Bystrica region
- Strechový Vrch, in Košice and Prešov.
- Veľký Milič, in Košice and Prešov.
- Zlatá Baňa, in Prešov.

==== Germany ====
- Kaiserstuhl, in Baden-Württemberg.

=== Western Europe ===
==== France ====
- Monts du Cantal, in Cantal. Largest volcano in Europe by area, and includes the peaks Plomb du Cantal and Puy Mary. Most recent eruption occurred 2-3 MYA.
- Puy de Sancy, in Auvergne-Rhône-Alpes. Both the tallest mountain in the Massif Central and volcano in France. Most recent eruption occurred 200 thousand years ago.
- Monts Dore
- Mont Ross
- Gallieni Massif

==== Netherlands ====
- Zuidwal
- Mulciber
  - Due to being related to the Zuidwal volcano, it is most likely a stratovolcano.
- The Quill
- Mount Scenery

==== United Kingdom ====
- The Cheviot, Northumberland, England.
- Esha Ness, Shetland, Scotland.
- Kilsyth Hills, Stirlingshire, Scotland
- Scafells, Cumberland, England, in the Lake District and containing England's tallest mountain Scafell Pike.

=== Southern Europe ===
==== Greece ====
- Milos, in the Aegean Sea.
- Nisyros

==== Italy ====
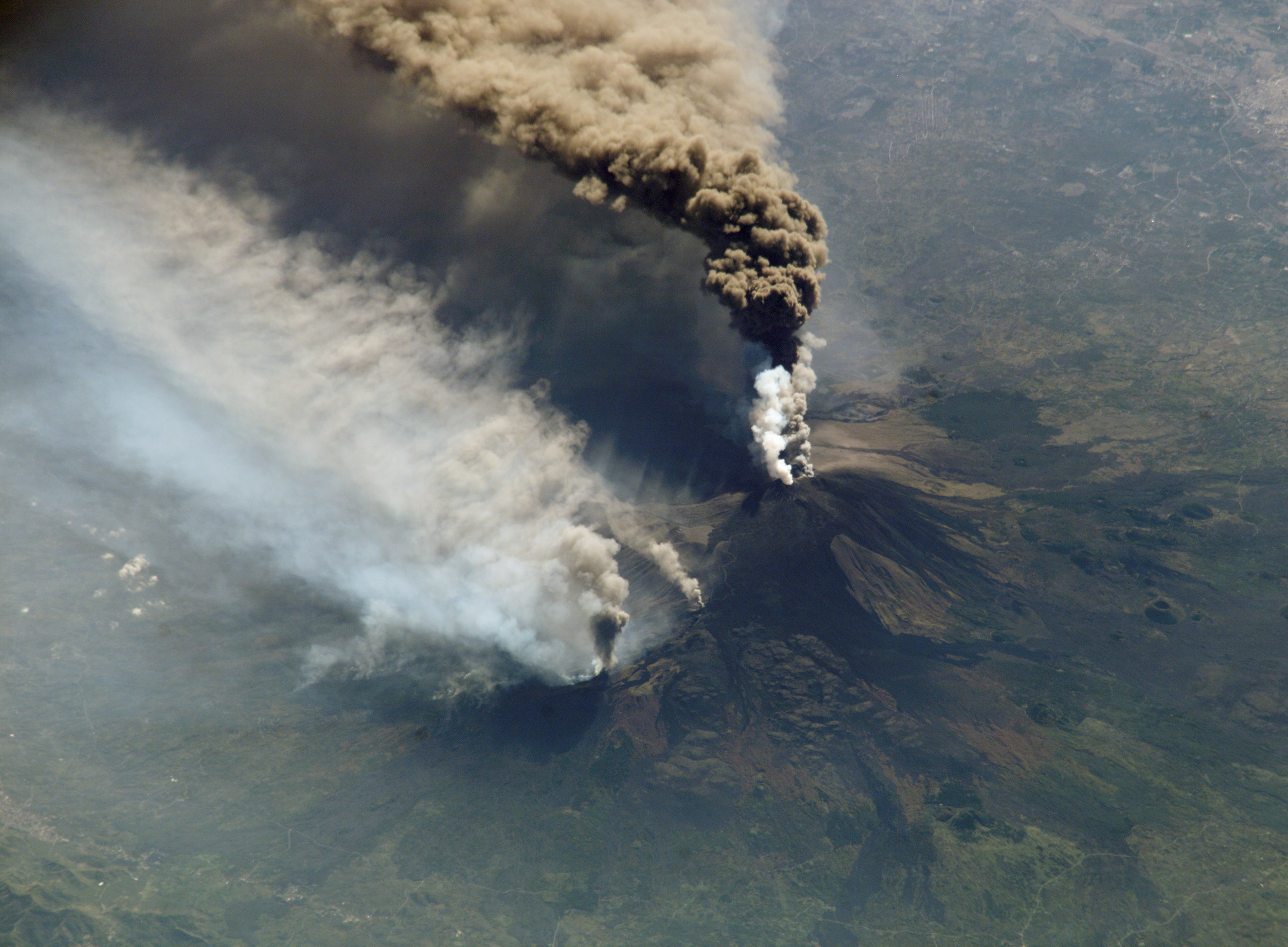
Mount Etna's 2002 eruption, photographed from the ISS.

- Alban Hills, located 20 kilometers (12 miles) east of Rome in Lazio. Last eruption happened in about 5,000 BC.
- Monte Vulture. Complex stratovolcano.
- Mount Etna near Catania in Sicily. Tallest active volcano in Europe. Recently erupted in 2013 and volcanic activity is still ongoing. Listed as a Decade Volcano.
- Mount Vesuvius, located 9 kilometers (5.6 miles) east of Naples in Campania. Famous for its violent eruption in August 24, A.D. 79. Its last eruption happened in March 1944. Designated a Decade Volcano.
- Stromboli and Vulcano, two of the Lipari Islands. The former has been continuously erupting for more than two millennia, making it the second most active volcano in Europe.. The latter last erupted in 1890.

==== Caucasus ====
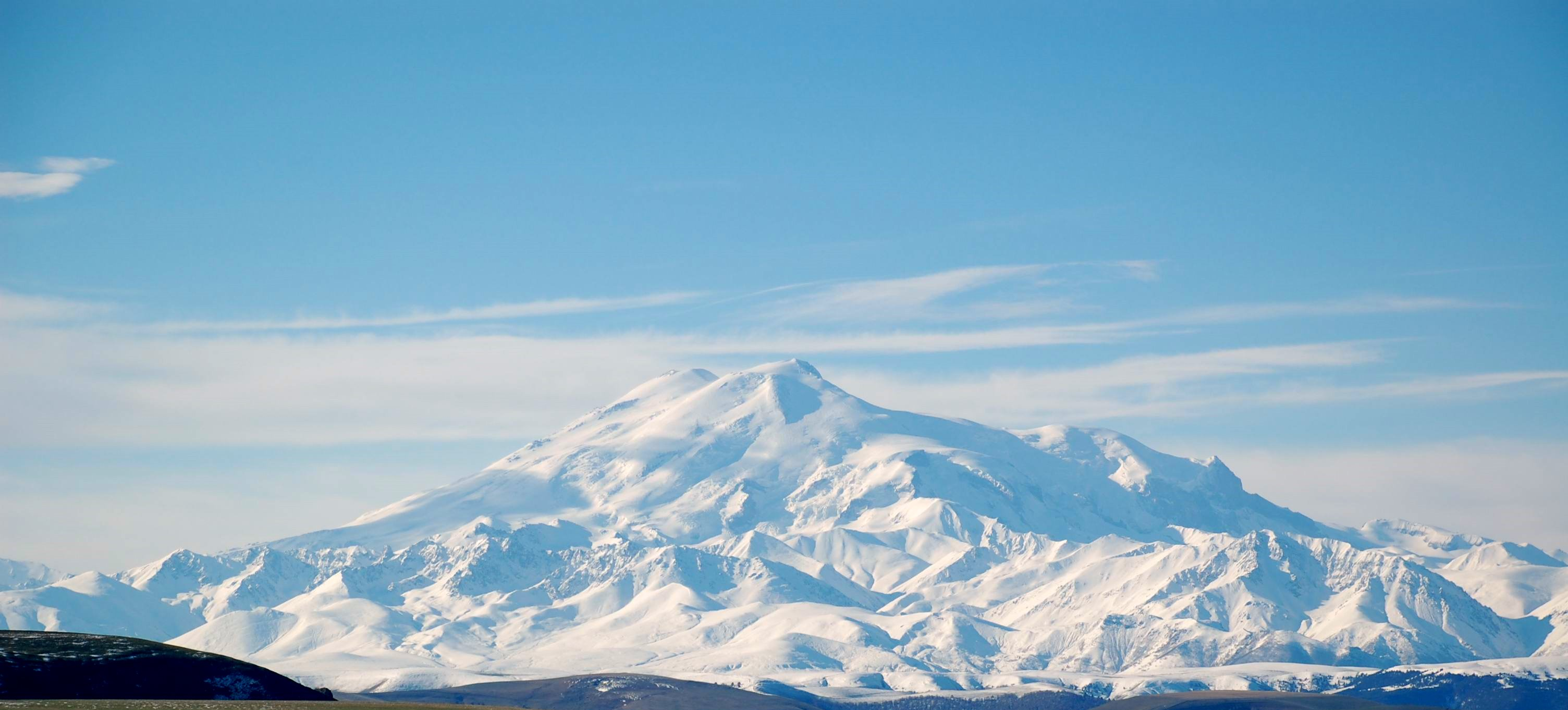
Mount Elbrus, a dormant stratovolcano and the tallest mountain in Russia and Europe.

- Mount Elbrus
- Mount Kazbek

==== Armenia ====
- Aragats

==== Georgia ====
- Didi Abuli
- Mount Kazbek
- Mount Samsari
- Mount Tavkvetili
- Tsiteli Khati

==== Czech Republic ====
- Doupov Mountains

==== Slovenia ====
- Smrekovec

=== Northern Europe ===
==== Iceland ====
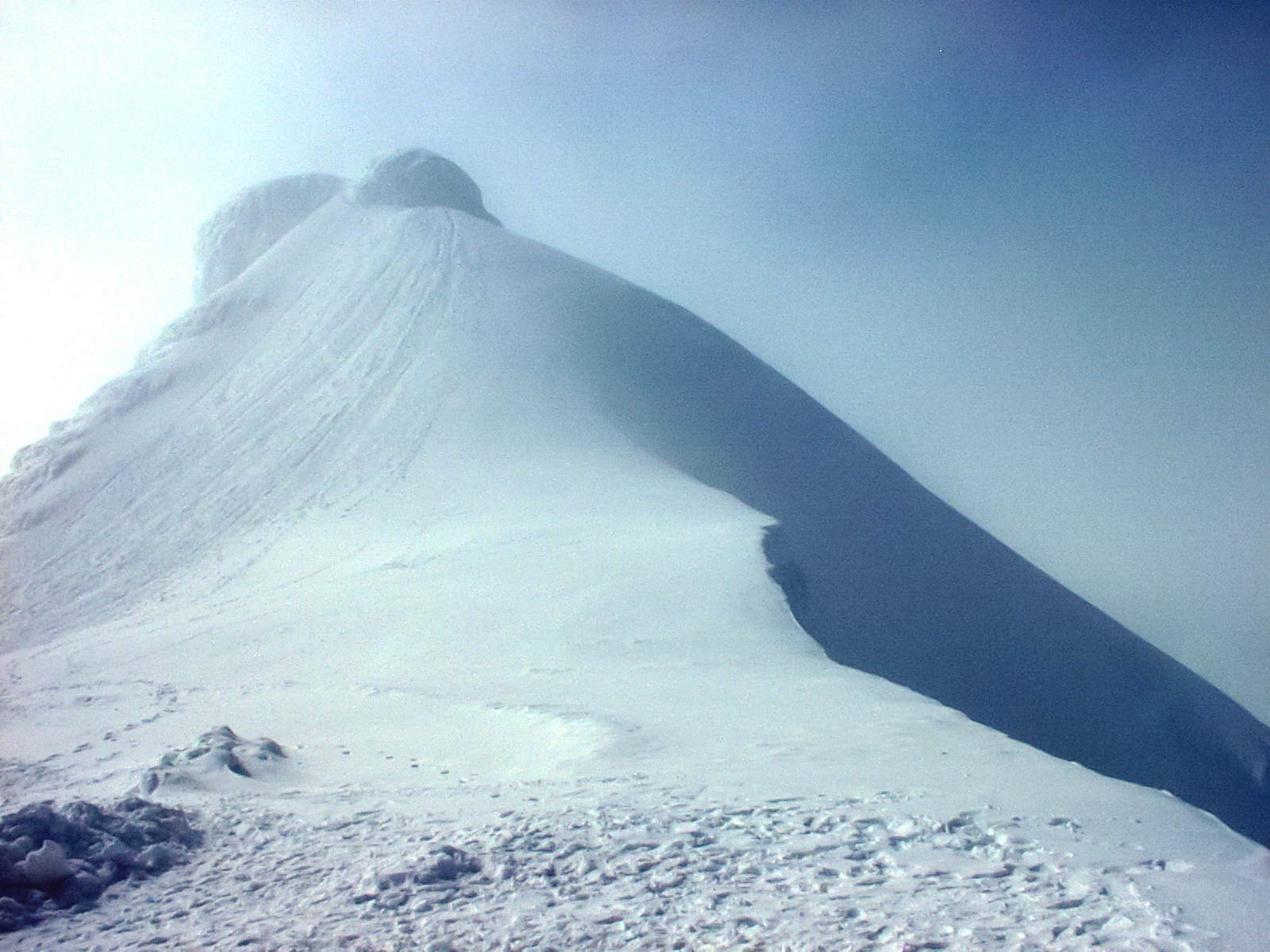
The summit of Snæfellsjökull

- Askja
- Bláfell
- Bláfjall
- Bárðarbunga. Recently erupted between 2014 and 2015
- Eldfell and Helgafell in the island of Heimaey
- Eyjafjallajökull. Erupted in 2010, which caused a major air traffic halts and flight cancellations in Europe and neighboring areas.
- Hekla
- Herdubreid
- Hlöðufell
- Hrútfell
- Kverkfjöll
- Snæfellsjökull
- Öræfajökull

==== Norway ====
- Beerenberg, Jan Mayen, the world's northernmost active volcano. Last erupted in 1985.
- Sverrefjellet, Svalbard.

== Oceania ==
=== French Polynesia ===
- Mehetia in Windward Islands of the Society Islands

=== Northern Mariana Islands ===
- Anatahan in Northern Mariana Islands

=== Australia ===
- Hillwood in Tasmania
- Mount Porndon in Victoria

=== New Zealand ===
Mount Ngauruhoe and Ruapehu (behind)

- Waitākere volcano in Auckland
- Mount Taranaki in Egmont National Park in North Island
- Mount Ngauruhoe in North Island
- Mount Ruapehu in Tongariro National Park
- Whakaari/White Island in Bay of Plenty
- Banks Peninsula in Christchurch, South Island

=== Papua New Guinea ===
- Mount Giluwe
  - This large shield volcano also shows evidence of stratovolcanic material.
- Mount Hagen
- Mount Bosavi
- Mount Sisa
- Doma Peaks
- Mount Kerewa
- Mount Ialibu
- Mount Murray
- Mount Duau
- Mount Faveng
- Mount Karimui
- Mount Suaru
- Yelia

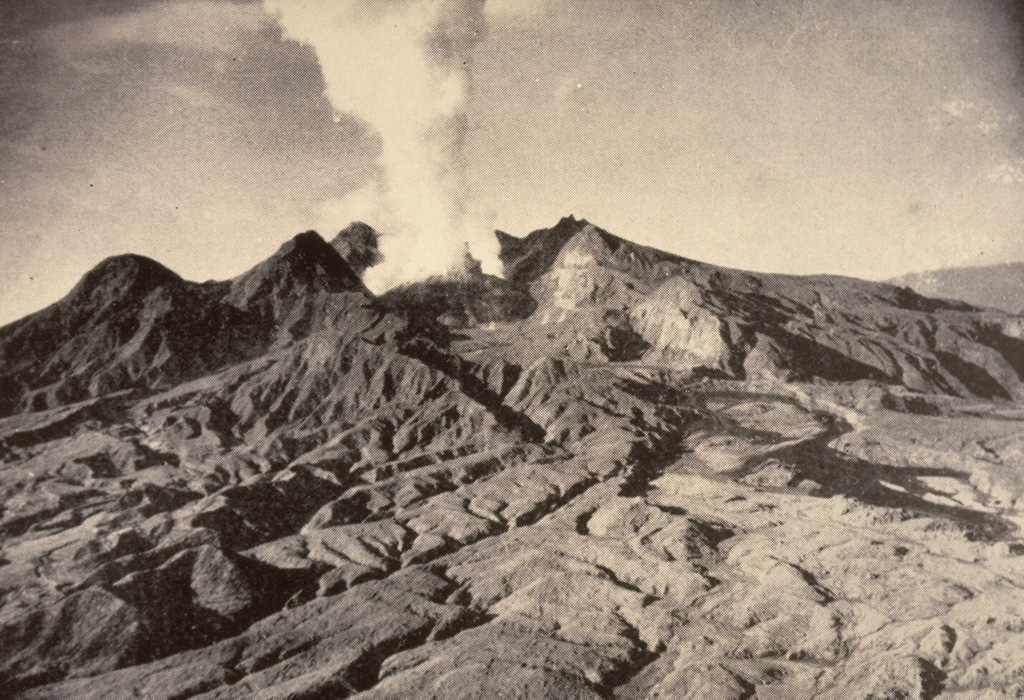
Mount Lamington in February 1951

- Mount Lamington
  - An active stratovolcano famous for the 1951 eruption which killed 3,000 people.
- Hydrographers Range
- Victory
- Mount Trafalgar
- Vokeo Island
- Koil Island
- Blup Blup
- Bam Island
- Kadovar
  - This small island stratovolcano erupted for the first recorded time in 2018
- Boisa Island
- Manam Island
- Karkar Island
- Mount Uluman
- Mount Kunugui
- Bagabag
- Crown Island
- Long Island
- Mount Reaumur
- Cerisy Peak
- Tolokiwa Island
- Umboi Island
- Mount Bel
- Sakar Island
- Ritter Island
  - This small, crescent-shaped island stratovolcano caused major damage during its 1888 eruption.
- Mount Talawe
- Langila
- Mount Tangi
- Mount Schrader
- Mount Andewa
- Garbuna Group
- Mount Garbuna
- Krummel
- Welcker
- Mount Bangum
- Bola
- Dakataua
- Mount Makalia
- Mount Mululus
- Mount Oto
- Lolo
  - A symmetrical stratovolcano overlapping the more ancient Mount Kapberg stratovolcano.
- Mount Kapberg
- Sulu Range
- Hargy
- Bamus
- Ulawun
  - Ulawun is one of the several Decade Volcanoes.
- Likuruanga
- Tavurvur
  - It recently erupted in 2014.
- Tore
- Mount Balbi
- Bagana
- Takuan Group
- Mount Takuan
- Two unnamed stratovolcanoes

=== Solomon Islands ===
- Kolombangara
- Nonda (volcano)
- Tinakula
- Mount Veve

== See also ==
- List of shield volcanoes
- List of cinder cones
- List of lava domes
- List of subglacial volcanoes
