= List of volcanoes in Papua New Guinea =

This is a list of active and extinct volcanoes in Papua New Guinea.

== New Guinea ==
Name	Elevation		Location	Last eruption
Name	meters	feet	Coordinates	Last eruption
Crater Mountain	3233	10,607	6.58°S 145.08°E	-
Doma Peaks	3568	11,706	5.90°S 143.15°E	-
Mount Giluwe	4368	14331	6°3′S 143°53′E	~ 220,000 years ago
Mount Hagen	3778	12395	5°45′S 144°02′E	~ 210,000 years ago
Hydrographers Range	1915	6283	9.00°S 148.37°E	-
Koranga	1500	4921	7.33°S 146.708°E	-
Lamington	1680	5512	8.95°S 148.15°E	1956
Madilogo	850	2789	9.20°S 147.57°E	-
Managlase Plateau	1342	4403	9.08°S 148.33°E	-
Sessagara	370	1214	9.48°S 149.13°E	-
Victory	1925	6316	9.20°S 149.07°E	1935
Waiowa	640	2100	9.57°S 149.075°E	1944
Yelia	3384	11,102	7.05°S 145.858°E	Pleistocene
Mount Bosavi	2507	8225	6°36′51″S 142°49′36″E	200,000 years ago

== Admiralty Islands ==
Name	Elevation		Location	Last eruption
Name	meters	feet	Coordinates	Last eruption
Baluan	254	833	2.57°S 147.28°E	Holocene
St. Andrew Strait	270	886	2.38°S 147.35°E	1957
Titan Ridge	–1300	–4265	3.03°S 147.78°E	2026

== Bougainville ==
Name	Elevation		Location	Last eruption
Name	meters	feet	Coordinates	Last eruption
Bagana	1750	5741	6.140°S 155.195°E	2006
Balbi	2715	8907	5.92°S 154.98°E	Holocene
Billy Mitchell	1544	5066	6.092°S 155.225°E	1580
Loloru	1887	6191	6.52°S 155.62°E	1050 BC
Takuan Group	2210	7251	6.442°S 155.608°E	Holocene
Tore	2200	7218	5.83°S 154.93°E	Holocene

== D'Entrecasteaux Islands ==
Name	Elevation		Location	Last eruption
Name	meters	feet	Coordinates	Last eruption
Dawson Strait Group	500	1640	9.62°S 150.88°E	1350
Goodenough	220	722	9.48°S 150.35°E	Holocene
Iamalele	200	656	9.52°S 150.53°E	Holocene

== New Britain ==
Name	Elevation		Location	Last eruption
Name	meters	feet	Coordinates	Last eruption
Bamus	2248	7375	5.20°S 151.23°E	1886
Bola	1155	3789	5.15°S 150.03°E	Holocene
Dakataua	400	1312	5.056°S 150.108°E	1895
Garove	368	1207	4.692°S 149.50°E	Holocene
Garbuna Group	564	1850	5.45°S 150.03°E	2005
Garua Harbour	565	1854	5.30°S 150.07°E	-
Hargy	1148	3766	5.33°S 151.05°E	950
Langila	1330	4363	5.525°S 148.42°E	2021
Likuruanga	904	2966	4.953°S 151.385°E	Pleistocene
Lolo	805	2641	5.468°S 150.507°E	-
Lolobau	858	2815	4.92°S 151.158°E	1912
Mundua	179	587	4.63°S 149.35°E	Holocene
Narage	307	1007	4.55°S 149.125°E	Pleistocene
Pago	742	2434	5.58°S 150.52°E	2003
Rabaul	688	2257	4.271°S 152.203°E	2006
Sulu Range	610	2001	5.50°S 150.942°E	-
Tavui	200	656	4.12°S 152.20°E	5150 BC
Ulawun	2334	7657	5.05°S 151.33°E	2025 (ongoing)
Unnamed	-	-	4.75°S 150.85°E	-
Unnamed	-	-	5.20°S 148.57°E	-

== New Ireland ==
Name	Elevation		Location	Last eruption
Name	meters	feet	Coordinates	Last eruption
Ambitle	450	1476	4.08°S 153.65°E	350 BC
Lihir	700	2297	3.125°S 152.642°E	Holocene

== Offshore islands ==
Name	Elevation		Location	Last eruption
Name	meters	feet	Coordinates	Last eruption
Bam	685	2247	3.613°S 144.818°E	1960
Blup Blup	402	1319	3.507°S 144.605°E	-
Boisa	240	787	3.994°S 144.963°E	-
Kadovar	365	1197	3.609°S 144.589°E	2021
Karkar	1839	6033	4.649°S 145.964°E	1979
Long Island	1280	4199	5.358°S 147.12°E	1993
Manam	1807	5928	4.080°S 145.037°E	2022
New Hanover Island	900	3000	2.5°S 150.25°E	-
Ritter Island	140	459	5.52°S 148.121°E	1974
Sakar	992	3255	5.414°S 148.094°E	-
Umboi	1584	5079	5.589°S 147.875°E	Holocene
Yomba	-	-	4.90°S 146.75°E	-
Unnamed	-2000	-6562	4.311°S 146.256°E	-
