= Tore (volcano) =

Volcano in Papua New Guinea

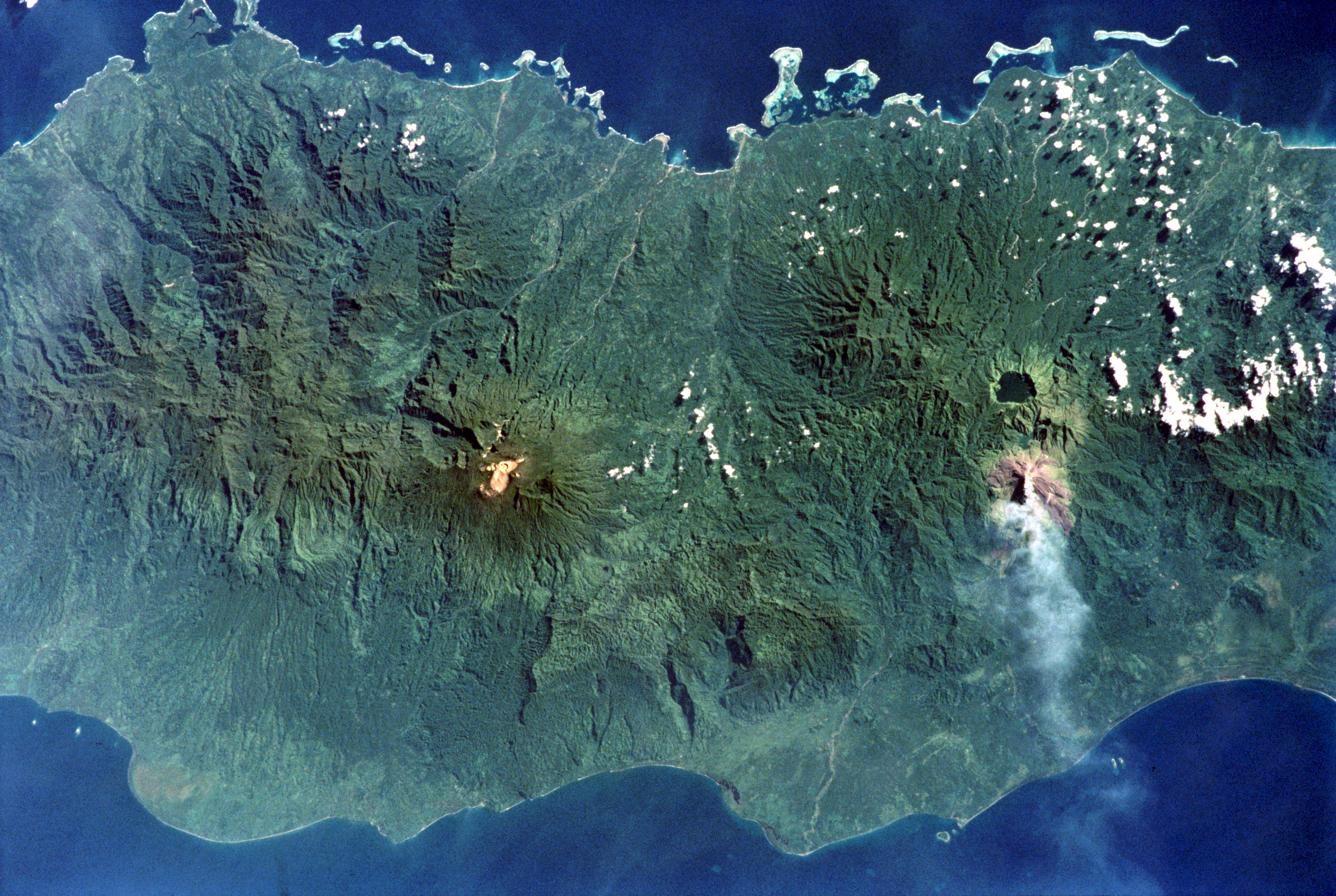
- The Tore massif lies to the left of the light-colored area at the center of the image, Mount Balbi.

Highest point
- Elevation: 2,175 m (7,136 ft)
- Coordinates: 5.83°S 154.93°E

Geography
- Location within Papua New Guinea
- Location: Bougainville, Papua New Guinea
- Parent range: Emperor Range

Geology
- Mountain type(s): Caldera, lava cone
- Last eruption: Unknown

Tore is a volcano located in the northern part of the island of Bougainville, Papua New Guinea. Violent Pleistocene eruptions produced two ignimbrite fans stretching west to the coast, and a 6 km by 9 km caldera. A post-caldera lava cone on the caldera's southern rim is the source of lava flows. Well-preserved features suggests a recent date for this cone and a nearby ash cone.

== See also ==
- List of volcanoes in Papua New Guinea
