= Nonda (disambiguation) =

Nonda (1922–2005) was a Greek expressionist artist.

Nonda may also refer to:

- Shabani Nonda (born 1977), DR Congolese football player
- Nonda Katsalidis (born 1951), Greek-Australian architect
- Nonda plum
- Nonda (volcano), in Vella Lavella, Solomon Islands
- Nonda inc, A connected car company in silicon valley
