= Dampier Strait (Papua New Guinea) =

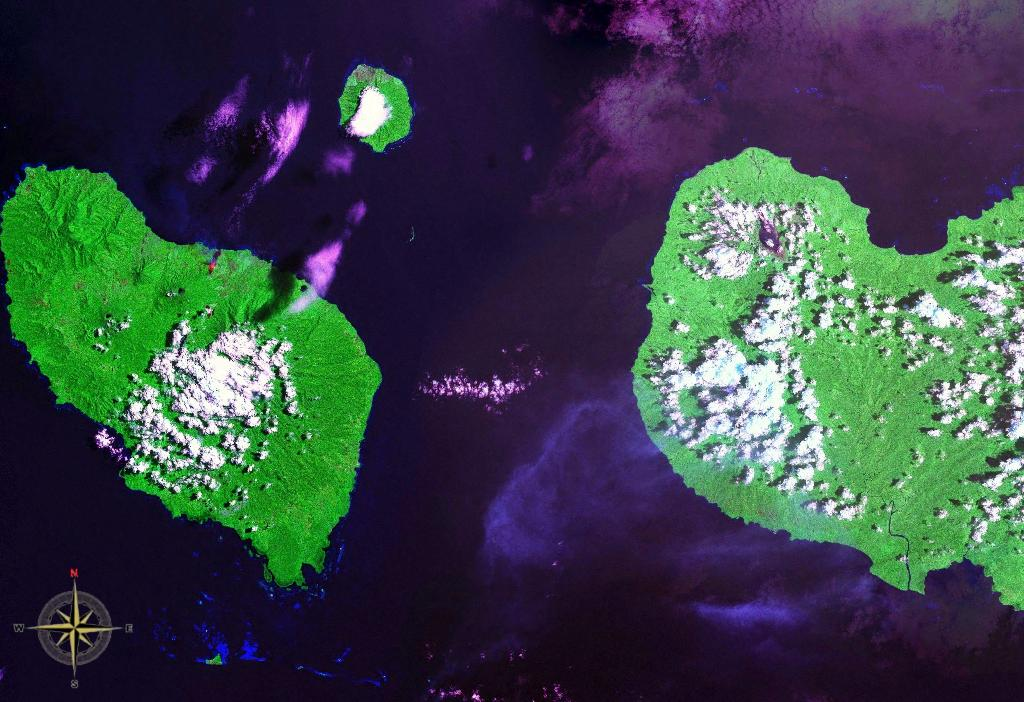
- Dampier Strait seen from space. Also visible are Umboi Island (west), New Britain (east) and Sakar Island (north). (false colors)

- Location within Papua New Guinea
- Coordinates: 5.6°S 148.2°E
- Type: strait

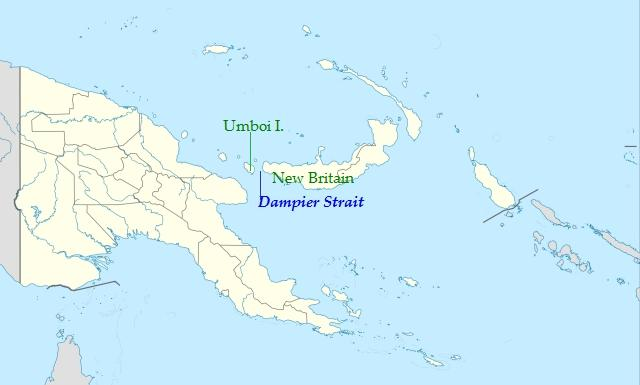
Dampier Strait

Dampier Strait in Papua New Guinea separates Umboi Island and New Britain, linking the Bismarck Sea to the north with the deeper Solomon Sea to the south.

== History ==
The strait is named after the first European to sail through it. This was the British navigator William Dampier, in the last days of March 1700, aboard HMS Roebuck. Dampier described his discoveries in his A Continuation of a Voyage to New Holland Ch. 4 New Britain Discovered in these terms:

NEW BRITAIN.

The easternmost part of New Guinea lies 40 miles to the westward of this tract of land, and by hydrographers they are made joining together: but here I found an opening and passage between, with many islands; the largest of which lie on the north side of this passage or strait. The channel is very good, between the islands and the land to the eastward. ... As we stood over to the islands we looked out very well to the north, but could see no land that way; by which I was well assured that we were got through, and that this east land does not join to New Guinea; therefore I named it New Britain. The north-west cape I called Cape Gloucester, and the south-west point Cape Anne; and the north-west mountain, which is very remarkable, I called Mount Gloucester.

...

SIR GEORGE ROOK'S ISLAND.

Being near the island to the northward of the volcano I sent my boat to sound, thinking to anchor here; but she returned and brought me word that they had no ground, till they met with a reef of coral rocks about a mile from the shore. Then I bore away to the north side of the island where we found no anchoring neither. We saw several people, and some coconut-trees, but could not send ashore for want of my pinnace which was out of order. In the evening I stood off to sea to be at such a distance that I might not be driven by any current upon the shoals of this island if it should prove calm. We had but little wind, especially the beginning of the night; but in the morning I found myself so far to the west of the island that, the wind being at east-south-east, I could not fetch it; wherefore I kept on to the southward and stemmed with the body of a high island about 11 or 12 leagues long, lying to the southward of that which I before designed for. I named this island Sir George Rook's Island.

LONG ISLAND AND CROWN ISLAND, DISCOVERED AND DESCRIBED.

We also saw some other islands to the westward; which may be better seen in my chart of these lands than here described. But, seeing a very small island lying to the north-west of the long island which was before us, and not far from it, I steered away for that; hoping to find anchoring there: and, having but little wind, I sent my boat before to sound; which, when we were about 2 miles distance from the shore, came on board and brought me word that there was good anchoring in 30 or 40 fathom water, a mile from the isle and within a reef of the rocks which lay in a half-moon, reaching from the north part of the island to the south-east: so at noon we got in and anchored in 36 fathom a mile from the isle.

In the afternoon I sent my boat ashore to the island to see what convenience there was to haul our vessel ashore in order to be mended, and whether we could catch any fish. My men in the boat rowed about the island, but could not land by reason of the rocks and a great surge running in upon the shore. We found variation here 8 degrees 25 minutes west.

I designed to have stayed among these islands till I had got my pinnace refitted; but, having no more than one man who had skill to work upon her, I saw she would be a long time in repairing (which was one great reason why I could not prosecute my discoveries further) and, the easterly winds being set in, I found I should scarce be able to hold my ground.

The 31st in the forenoon we shot in between 2 islands lying about 4 leagues asunder; with intention to pass between them. The southernmost is a long island with a high hill at each end; this I named Long island. The northernmost is a round high island towering up with several heads or tops, something resembling a crown; this I named Crown Isle from its form. Both these islands appeared very pleasant, having spots of green savannahs mixed among the woodland: the trees appeared very green and flourishing, and some of them looked white and full of blossoms. We passed close by Crown Isle; saw many coconut-trees on the bays and the sides of the hills; and one boat was coming off from the shore but returned again. We saw no smokes on either of the islands, neither did we see any plantations; and it is probable they are not very well peopled. We saw many shoals near Crown Island, and reefs of rocks running off from the points a mile or more into the sea. My boat was once overboard with design to have sent her ashore; but, having little wind and seeing some shoals, I hoisted her in again and stood off out of danger.

The southern entrance to the strait is obstructed by dangerous reefs. But there are passages between these, particularly near the coast of New Britain.

== Annexations and World Wars ==
After the (British) Imperial annulment of the 1883 annexation by the Queensland colonial government of New Guinea east of the Dutch boundary at 141 E, in 1884 Germany "annexed the northern shore of New Guinea from the Dutch boundary east-ward to Dampier Strait and the territory back of it theoretically to the crest of the central range of mountains." In so doing it changed the name of the New Britannia Archipelago to the Bismarck Archipelago.

On the outbreak of World War I in 1914, the armed forces of Australia took, among other German possessions, the Bismarck Archipelago and, after a few month's fighting, German New Guinea. The Treaty of Versailles created a League of Nations mandate over this area administratively vested in Australia.

On 8 March 1942, the Japanese landed two battalions at Lae and Salamaua on the Huon Gulf giving them control of the Dampier and Vitiaz Straits. In December 1943 American forces landed on New Britain. General Douglas MacArthur announced that Rooke Island (Umboi Island) had been occupied on 12 February 1944 by American forces who met no opposition: Company B, 1st Marines had crossed the Dampier Strait on landing craft.
