= Cappy Mountain =

Stratovolcano in Oregon

Highest point
- Elevation: 7,372 ft (2,247 m)
- Coordinates: 43°18′36″N 121°58′44″W

Geology
- Mountain type: Stratovolcano
- Last eruption: Pleistocene

Cappy Mountain, located in Klamath County in the U.S. state of Oregon, is a stratovolcano in the Cascade Range. It last erupted in the Pleistocene.

== Geography ==
Cappy Mountain lies on the northern border of the Mount Thielsen Wilderness. It is surrounded by other Cascade volcanoes, such as the Cinnamon Butte volcanic field to the southwest, Howlock Mountain and Mount Thielsen to the south, and Cowhorn Mountain and Sawtooth Mountain to the north and northwest respectively.
