= Garbuna Group =

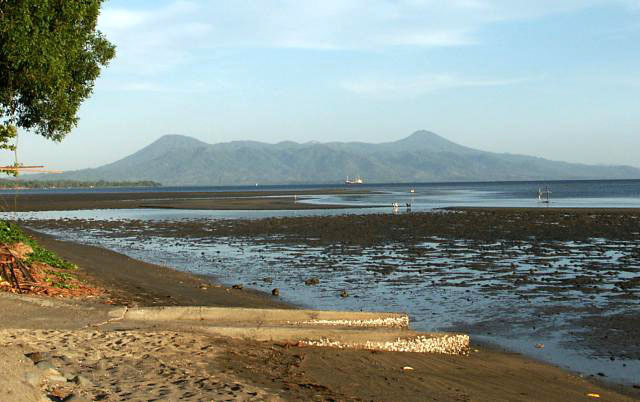
- Garbuna Group in 2002

Highest point
- Elevation: 564 m (1,850 ft)
- Coordinates: 5°27′0″S 150°2′0″E

Geography
- Location within Papua New Guinea
- Location: New Britain Island, Papua New Guinea

Geology
- Mountain type: Stratovolcanoes
- Volcanic arc: Bismarck volcanic arc
- Last eruption: July to October 2008

The Garbuna Group of volcanoes consists of three volcanic peaks, Krummel, Garbuna, and Welcker, atop a shield volcano. They are located at the southern end of the Willaumez Peninsula, just to the west of the town of Kimbe, in West New Britain Province, Papua New Guinea. Garbuna contains a large thermal field, probably Papua New Guinea's largest.

Until recently, it was assumed that the Garbuna volcano was probably dormant, or perhaps extinct. The last eruption was believed to have occurred around 1300 AD, or 700 years ago. Evidence from past eruptions indicates large amounts of tephra and lava were produced.

However, on 17 October 2005 the Garbuna volcano erupted without warning. Ash was reported 4,000 m above the summit. An ash warning for aircraft was distributed by the Darwin office of the Australian Bureau of Meteorology on 19 October, by which time a second new vent had appeared. Ash was apparently drifting to the north-west on 19 October and had contaminated some village water supplies.

Eruptions continued into November 2005, although less violently. By January 2006, the main activity was limited to volumes of white vapour being discharged from the new vents.

Garbuna is less than 20 km to the west of Kimbe, the main urban centre of West New Britain and the location of an important palm oil industry.

In August 2002, the Pago volcano to the east of Kimbe erupted and caused 12,000 people to seek refuge in care centres. The Hoskins Airport was closed for some time due to ash falls. This volcano was previously active in 1990.

== See also ==
- List of volcanoes in Papua New Guinea
