= Sulphur Glacier =

Glacier in Shoshone National Forest, Wyoming USA

- Location within Wyoming
- Type: Mountain glacier
- Location: Park County, Wyoming, USA
- Coordinates: 44°36′33″N 109°46′05″W
- Area: 30 acres (12 ha)
- Length: .20 mi (0.32 km)
- Width: .90 mi (1.45 km)
- Terminus: talus
- Status: retreating

Sulphur Glacier is located in Shoshone National Forest, in the U.S. state of Wyoming on the east of the Sunlight Peak in the Absaroka Range. The glacier sits at an elevation of between 11,000 and 10,400 ft (3,400 and 3,200 m). Sulphur Glacier is also within the North Absaroka Wilderness.

== See also ==
- List of glaciers in the United States
