= Willaumez Peninsula =

Coordinates: 5°15′47″S 150°00′51″E

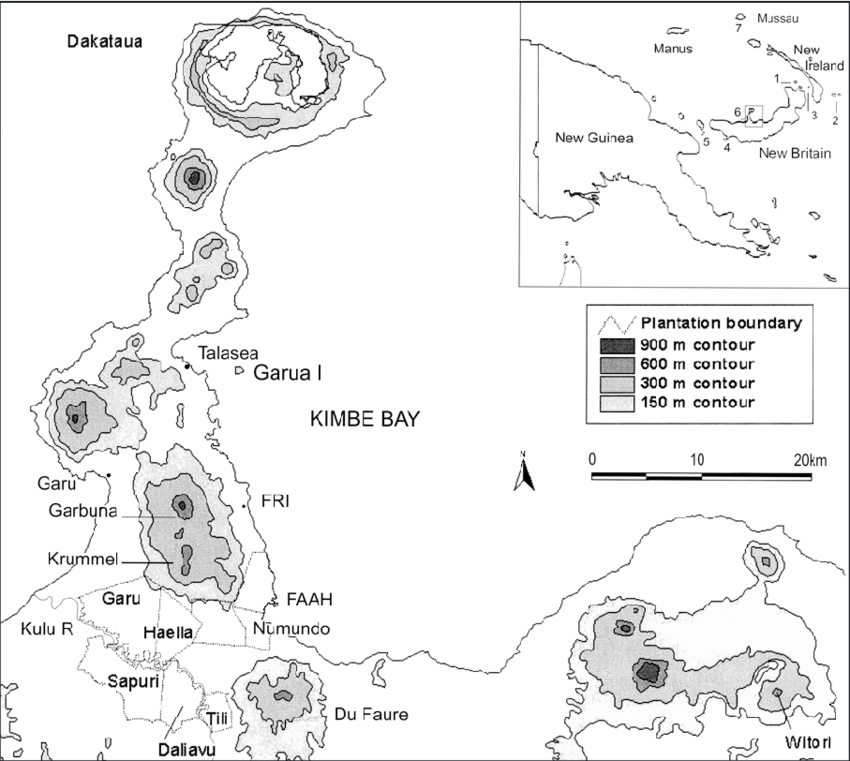
The Willaumez Peninsula

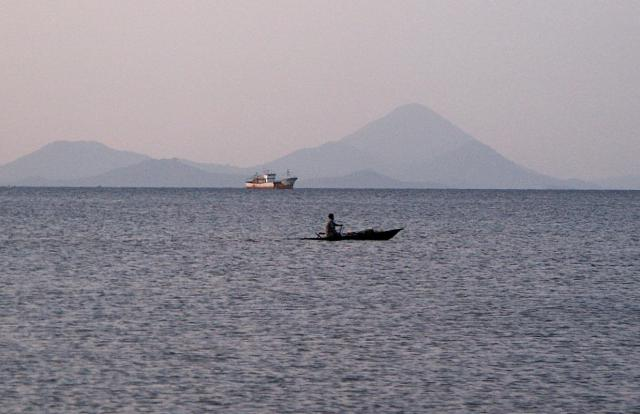
The Bola volcano (Wangore) rises above Stetin Bay. This stratovolcano has an almost perfect conical shape.

The Willaumez Peninsula is located on the north coast of New Britain in the West New Britain Province of Papua New Guinea. It was named after Jean-Baptiste Philibert Willaumez by Antoine Bruni d'Entrecasteaux. The peninsula extends into the Bismarck Sea as an elongated headland and is of volcanic origin. The Dakataua Caldera is located at the northern tip of the Willaumez Peninsula. Kimbe Bay is to the east of the peninsula. On the western side is Riebeck Bay.

The northernmost tip of the peninsula is known as Cape Hollman. A report by the UK Hydrographic Office described Cape Hollman as "high, cliffy, and steep".
