= Summer Coon =

Volcano in Colorado

Coordinates: 37°46′30″N 106°22′04″W

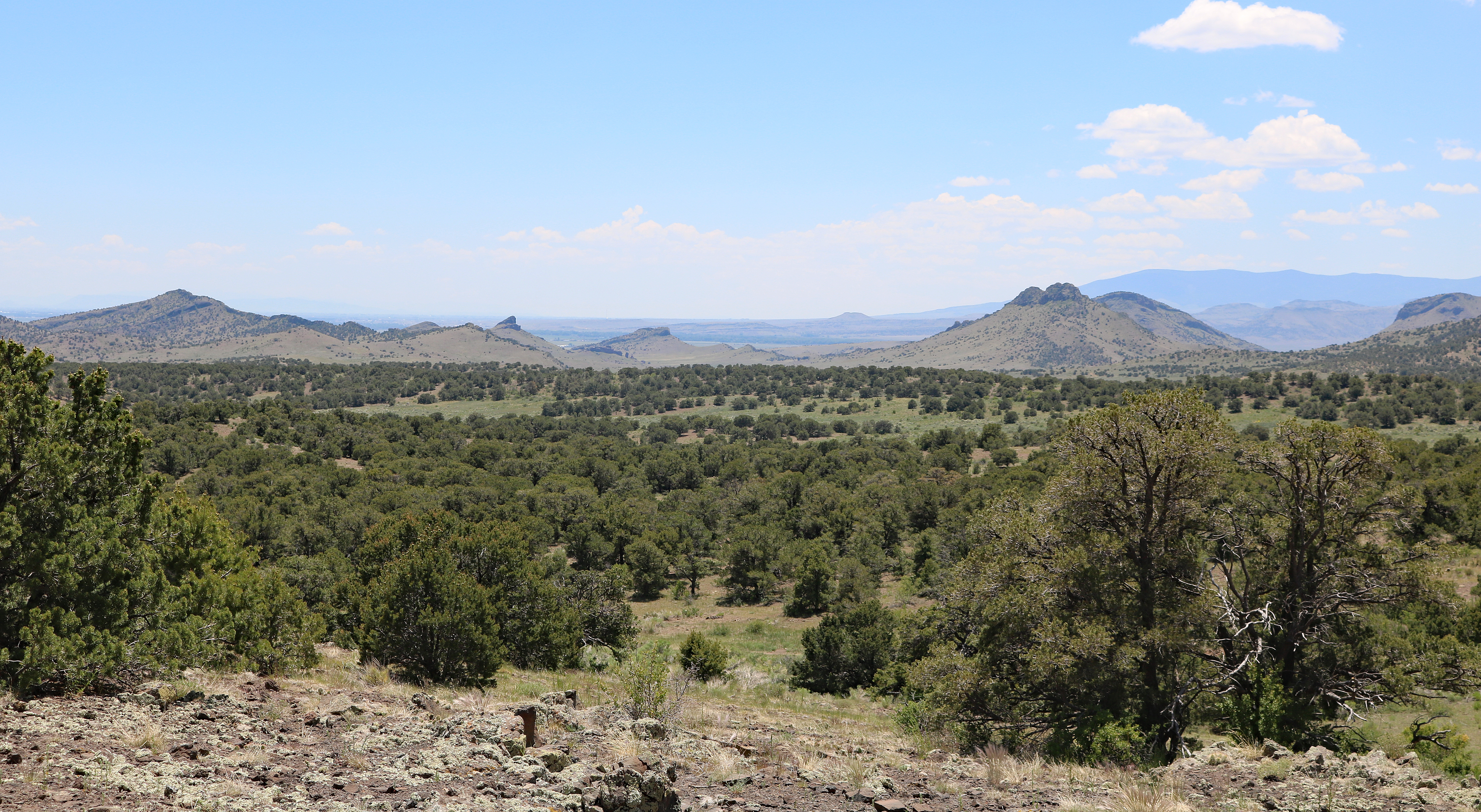

Summer Coon is an Oligocene stratovolcano in Saguache County, Colorado that erupted between 24 and 34 million years ago. It is located 6 miles (9.6 km) north of Del Norte, Colorado and is on the western edge of the San Luis Valley. It is in the Rio Grande National Forest.

The New Mexico Geological Society published an article on it in 1971. Various studies of the area and its volcanic intrusions have been carried out. These include a study of trace element variations at the summit. La Ventana Arch resulted from erosion following volcanic activity.

== See also ==
- San Juan volcanic field
- List of volcanoes in the United States
- List of stratovolcanoes
