= Emperor Range =

Mountain Range in Bougainville

- Location within Papua New Guinea

Highest point
- Peak: Mount Balbi
- Elevation: 2,715 m (8,907 ft)

Geography
- State: Papua New Guinea
- Range coordinates: 5.75°S 154.9166667°E
- Parent range: Island of New Guinea

Emperor Range is a mountain range in northern part of the island of Bougainville, Papua New Guinea. Several volcanoes are located in the range, including highest point of the island - Mount Balbi.
