= Sulu Range =

Mountain range in Papua New Guinea

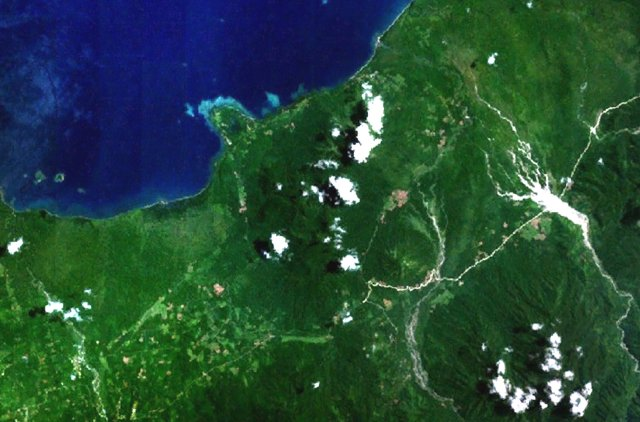
- Forested volcanoes of the Sulu Range, NASA Landsat image.

Highest point
- Elevation: 610 m (2,000 ft)
- Coordinates: 5°30′S 150°56′E

Geography
- Location: New Britain, Papua New Guinea

Geology
- Mountain type: Stratovolcanoes
- Last eruption: Unknown

The Sulu Range is a small volcanic mountain range on the Papua New Guinean island of New Britain. It consists of a group of partially overlapping small stratovolcanoes and lava domes, with the highest point being 610 m (2,000 ft) Mount Malopu at the southwestern end of the range. Kaiamu, a maar at the northwestern end of the Sulu Range, forms a peninsula with a small lake extending about 1 km (0.62 mi) into Bangula Bay. Other volcanoes in the range include Mount Ululu, Mount Ruckenberg, Mount Talutu and Mount Ubia.

The Sulu Range consists of volcanic rocks ranging in composition from basaltic-to-rhyolitic. Eruptions are not known to have occurred from the range in recorded history, although some of the cones are relatively undissected, implying that there may have been eruptions throughout the Holocene. Volcanic unrest in 2006 resulted in the creation of a vigorous new fumarolic vent, which was preceded by vegetation die-off, seismicity and dust-producing landslides.

On the coastal plain west of the southwest base of the Sulu Range lies the Walo hydrothermal area, which consists of solfataras and mudpots. The fumaroles in this hydrothermal area have been used by locals for cooking food.

== See also ==
- List of volcanoes in Papua New Guinea
