= Waiowa =

- Goropu
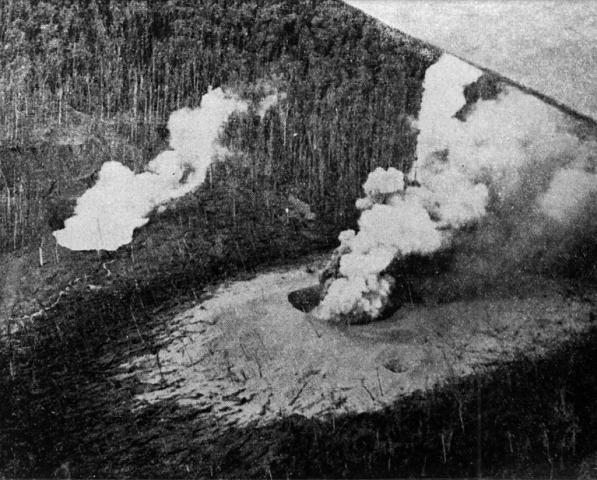
- Waiowa in eruption, February 1944

Highest point
- Elevation: 640 m (2,100 ft)
- Coordinates: 09°34′00″S 149°04′30″E

Geography
- Location within Papua New Guinea
- Location: Papua New Guinea, New Guinea island

Geology
- Mountain type: Pyroclastic cone
- Last eruption: 1943 to 1944

Waiowa (also called Goropu) is an isolated trachyandesitic volcano on New Guinea island, Papua New Guinea. It is located 19 km inland from Collingwood Bay in Oro Province. It lies on a fault line along the northeast flank of the Owen Stanley metamorphic belt. It is one of the planet's newest volcanoes, it formed in September 1943.

== 1943-1944 eruption ==
After four months of volcanic earthquakes, small phreatic eruptions began on 18 September 1943, breaking through a layer of highly metamorphosed rocks, before the first major explosion occurred on 27 December 1943. Two more major explosions occurred on 13 February and 23 July 1944, creating pyroclastic flows and lahars, and leveling 80 km^{2} of forest. The eruption stopped on the final explosion on 31 August 1944. The volcano was capped with a 500 m wide, steep-walled crater that is now forested and contains a small lake.
