= Langila =

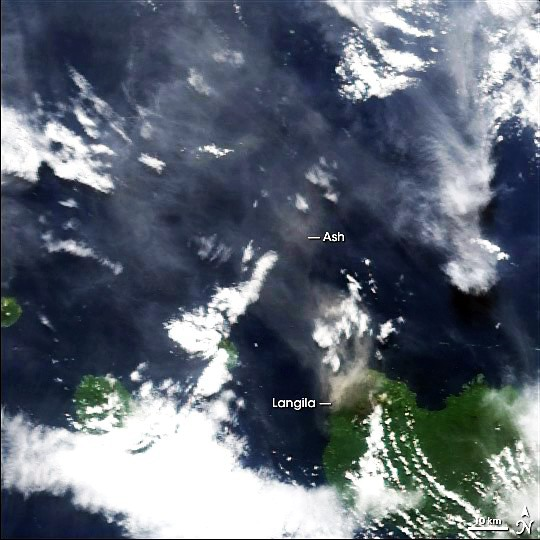
- NASA satellite image of ash from Langila

Highest point
- Elevation: 1,330 m (4,360 ft)
- Coordinates: 5.525°S 148.42°E

Geography
- Location within Papua New Guinea
- Location: New Britain, Papua New Guinea

Geology
- Mountain type: Stratovolcano
- Volcanic arc: Bismarck volcanic arc
- Last eruption: March 2025

Langila is one of the most active volcanoes of New Britain, Papua New Guinea. It consists of four overlapping volcanic cones on the eastern flank of an older extinct volcano, Talawe. Talawe is the largest volcano in Cape Gloucester. There have been dozens of recorded eruptions since the 19th century from three separate volcanic craters at the summit of Langila. The most recent eruptive cycle of Langila began in August 2006 and continued into early 2007. Volcanic activity at Langila consists of Strombo-Vulcanian and Vulcanian eruptions and lava flows. Langila is one of the most active volcanoes in the Bismark archipelago. The smallest crater is crater number 3.

In the times of German New Guinea, this volcano on the island then called Neupommern was known by the name of Ehlers-Berg after the German discoverer and travel author from Hamburg, Otto Ehrenfried Ehlers.

== See also ==
- List of volcanoes in Papua New Guinea
