= Tsiteli Khati =

Mountain summit in Georgia

- Location within Georgia Location within Mtskheta-Mtianeti

Highest point
- Elevation: 3,026 m (9,928 ft)
- Coordinates: 42°24′53″N 44°20′37″E

Geography
- Location: Georgia
- Parent range: Kharuli

Tsiteli Khati (Georgian: წითელი ხატი) is a summit of the Kharuli Range in Northern Georgia. The elevation of the peak is 3,026 metres (9,928 ft) above sea level. The mountain is located within the Kheli Volcanic Region of Georgia, an area which is the largest source of volcanism on the southern slopes of the Greater Caucasus Mountain Range within Georgia's boundaries. Tsiteli Khati is built up of holocene age andesites and dacitic lavas. The peak itself is a young volcanic cone with slopes that show no signs of any significant erosion. The vegetation of the mountain consists of subalpine and alpine meadows.
