= Yelia (volcano) =

Stratovolcano in Papua New Guinea

- Location within Papua New Guinea

Highest point
- Elevation: 3,384 m (11,102 ft)
- Coordinates: 7°03′00″S 145°51′29″E

Geography
- Location: Eastern Highlands Province, Papua New Guinea

Geology
- Mountain type: Stratovolcano
- Last eruption: Pleistocene

Yelia is a stratovolcano and collection of lava domes in Eastern Highlands Province, Papua New Guinea. It was first identified in 1963. The summit crater is occupied by a large lava dome which bears 11 craters. Two large lava domes are located on its north-northeastern slopes while two smaller domes are located to the west. No eruptions in the Holocene are known and the last major eruption occurred 18,000 years ago. However, there are unconfirmed reports from the native population of an eruption in the 1940s. The volcano presently displays fumarolic activity at its summit.

== See also ==
- List of volcanoes in Papua New Guinea
