= Bola (volcano) =

Volcano in Papua New Guinea

Bola Volcano
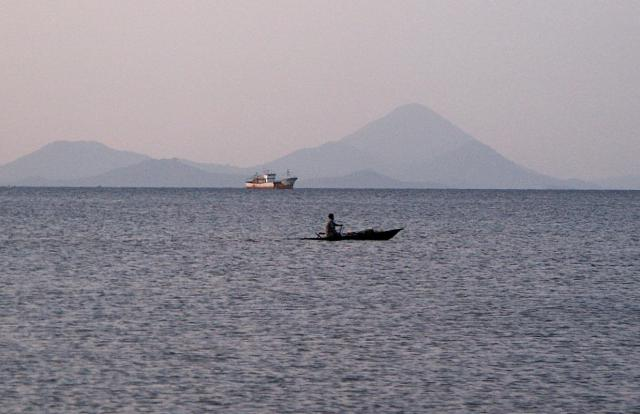
- The Bola volcano rises above Stetin Bay in New Britain.

Highest point
- Elevation: 1,116 m (3,661 ft)
- Coordinates: 5°09′S 150°02′E

Geography
- Location within Papua New Guinea
- Location: New Britain, Papua New Guinea

Geology
- Mountain type: Stratovolcano
- Last eruption: Holocene

The Bola volcano, also known as Wangore, is an andesitic stratovolcano, located south-west of the Dakataua caldera in New Britain, Papua New Guinea. It is 1,116 metres (3,661 ft) tall and has a 400 m (1,310 ft) wide summit crater.

The most recent lava flow was erupted from the summit crater and flowed to the west. This viscous flow is at least 50 m thick, thus leaving an irregularity in the profile of the volcano. The unforested summit crater and weak fumarolic activity suggest that the most recent eruption may have been only a few hundred years ago.

== See also ==
- List of volcanoes in Papua New Guinea
