= Sunlight Peak (Wyoming) =

Mountain in Wyoming, United States

Sunrise Peak
- Location within Wyoming

Highest point
- Elevation: 11,927 ft (3,635 m)
- Prominence: 962 ft (293 m)
- Coordinates: 44°36′33″N 109°46′05″W

Geography
- Location: Park County, Wyoming, U.S.
- Parent range: Absaroka Range
- Topo map: USGS Sunlight Peak WY

Geology
- Mountain type: Stratovolcano
- Volcanic arc: Absaroka Range
- Last eruption: Around 43 million years ago

Climbing
- First ascent: Unknown
- Easiest route: Scramble class III

Sunlight Peak (11,927 feet (3,635 m)) is located in the Absaroka Range, Shoshone National Forest in the U.S. state of Wyoming. Sulphur Glacier is situated on the east and northeast slopes of the peak.

== Geology ==
Sunlight Peak is one of several eroded stratovolcanoes in the volcanic arc of the Absaroka Range. Sunlight Peak's original stratovolcanic edifice has weathered away over time, leaving it as an ancient, extinct volcano. Along with the other older Absaroka volcanoes, Sunlight Peak last erupted around 43 million years ago.
