= Sakar Island =

Volcanic island in Papua New Guinea

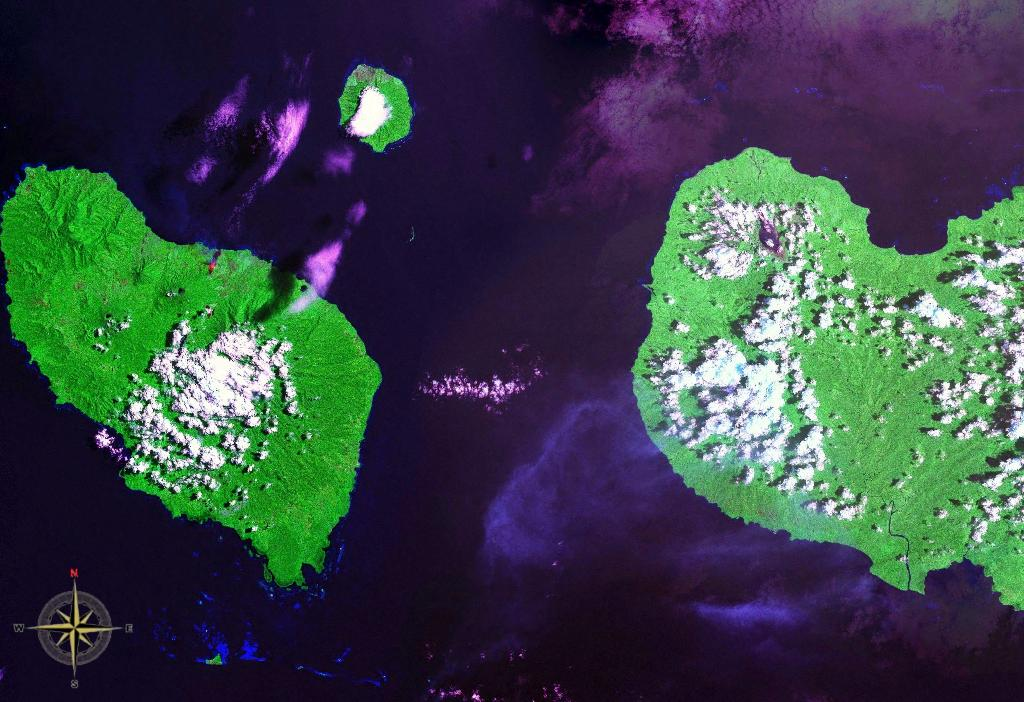
- Dampier Strait seen from space. Also visible are Umboi Island (west), New Britain (east) and Sakar Island (north). (false color)

Highest point
- Elevation: 992 m (3,255 ft)
- Prominence: 992 m (3,255 ft)
- Coordinates: 5°24′50″S 148°05′40″E

Geography
- Location within Papua New Guinea
- Location: Papua New Guinea

Geology
- Mountain type: Stratovolcano
- Last eruption: Unknown

Sakar Island is a volcanic island north-west of New Britain in the Bismarck Sea, at 5.416667°S 148.1°E. It is a stratovolcano with a summit crater lake. No recorded eruptions are known.

== See also ==
- List of volcanoes in Papua New Guinea
