= Takuan Group =

Volcanic group on Bougainville Island, Papua New Guinea

- Location within Papua New Guinea

Highest point
- Elevation: 2,251 m (7,385 ft)
- Prominence: 1,517 m (4,977 ft)
- Listing: Ultra; Ribu
- Coordinates: 6.442°S 155.608°E

Geography
- Location: Bougainville, Papua New Guinea

Geology
- Mountain type(s): Volcanic group of Stratovolcanoes and lava cones
- Last eruption: Unknown

Takuan Group is a volcanic group located in the southern part of Bougainville Island, Papua New Guinea. It consists of three closely spaced stratovolcanoes and lava cones, Mount Takuan being the highest of them.

== See also ==
- List of volcanoes in Papua New Guinea
