= Howlock Mountain =

Mountain in Oregon, United States

- Location within Oregon

Highest point
- Elevation: 8,401 ft (2,561 m) NAVD 88
- Prominence: 876 ft (267 m)
- Coordinates: 43°11′32″N 122°02′21″W

Geography
- Location: Douglas and Klamath counties, Oregon, U.S.
- Parent range: Cascades
- Topo map: USGS Mount Thielsen

Geology
- Mountain type: Shield volcano
- Volcanic arc: Cascade Volcanic Arc
- Last eruption: Pleistocene

Howlock Mountain is a heavily eroded shield volcano in the Cascade Range of central Oregon, located along the Cascade Crest just north of Mount Thielsen. Ice Age glaciers eroded away most of the flanks of the volcano, leaving numerous deep cirques surrounding a central ridge capped by several horns. The summit of Howlock Mountain lies along the border between Douglas County and Klamath County.
