= Nonda (volcano) =

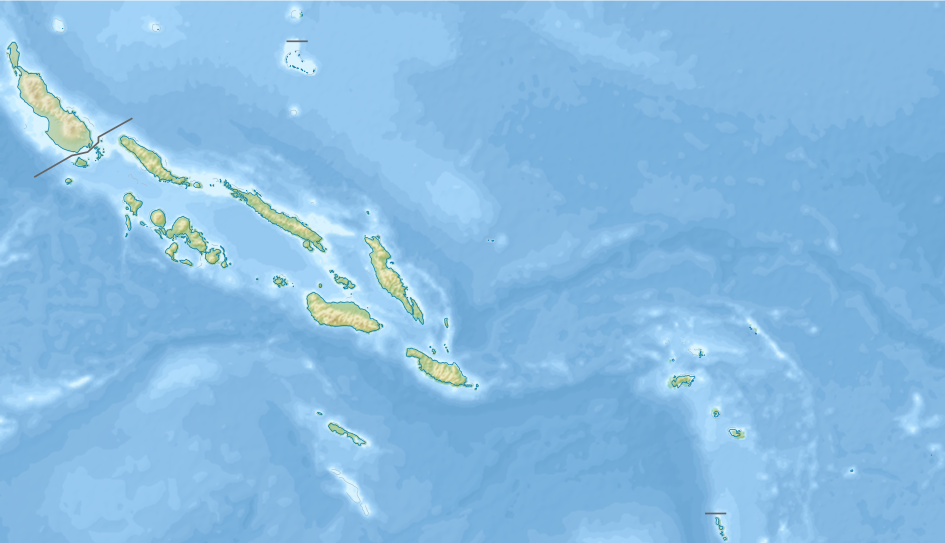
- Location within Solomon Islands

Highest point
- Coordinates: 7.67°S 156.6°E

Geography
- Location: Vella Lavella, Solomon Islands

Geology
- Mountain type: Stratovolcano
- Last eruption: Pleistocene era

Nonda is a stratovolcano on the island of Vella Lavella.
