= Hargy =

Volcano in Papua New Guinea

- Location within Papua New Guinea

Highest point
- Elevation: 1,148 m (3,766 ft)
- Coordinates: 5°33′0″S 151°1′0″E

Geography
- Location: New Britain, Papua New Guinea

Geology
- Mountain type: Stratovolcano
- Volcanic arc: Bismarck volcanic arc
- Last eruption: 950 CE

Hargy is a large volcanic caldera on the island of New Britain, Papua New Guinea. The caldera measures 12 km (7.5 mi) by 10 km (6.2 mi), and its floor is located at 150 m (490 ft) above sea level. It also hosts an inner-caldera with a steep west-facing wall. Lake Hargy, located within the caldera, drains through a narrow river that runs along the northern wall. The caldera-forming eruption occurred approximately 11,000 years ago (5050 BCE). At the western part of the caldera rises Galloseulo, a post-caldera dacitic lava cone with a 700 m (2,300 ft)-wide crater, occupied by a pair of smaller craters. Galloseulo has produced many small eruptions in the past 7,000 years, with the most recent in 950 CE. In September 1990, minor fumarolic activity was observed in the western summit crater of Galloseulo.

The volcano was named after Fred Hargesheimer, who was often known as "Hargy" by locals.
