= Mount Balbi =

Mountain on Bougainville Island, Papua New Guinea

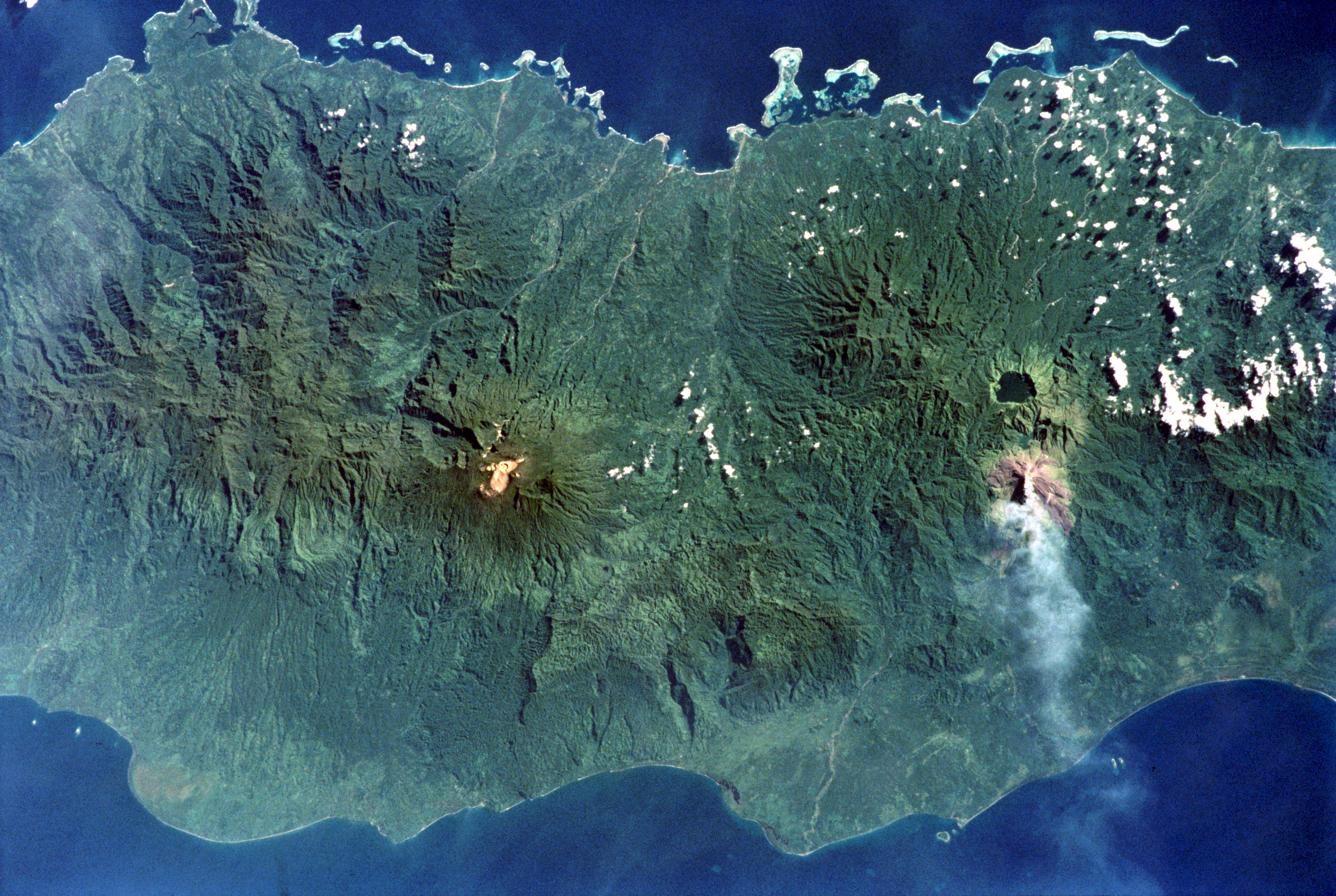
- Mount Balbi is the light-colored area at the center of the image.

Highest point
- Elevation: 2,715 m (8,907 ft)
- Prominence: 2,715 m (8,907 ft)
- Listing: Ultra; Ribu
- Coordinates: 05°54′51″S 154°58′57″E

Geography
- Location within Papua New Guinea
- Location: Bougainville, Papua New Guinea
- Parent range: Emperor Range

Geology
- Rock age: Appr. 10 to 12 000 years ago
- Mountain type: Stratovolcano
- Last eruption: Not in historic time

Mount Balbi is a Holocene stratovolcano located in the northern portion of the island of Bougainville, Papua New Guinea. A gentle prominence at 05°54′09″S 154°59′28″E is the highest point of the island. There are five volcanic craters east of the summit, one of which contains a crater lake. The summit is composed of coalesced cones and lava domes which host a large solfatara field. There are numerous fumaroles near the craters, though Balbi has not erupted in historic time.

== See also ==
- List of volcanoes in Papua New Guinea
- List of Ultras of Oceania
