= Dakataua =

Caldera Papua New Guinea

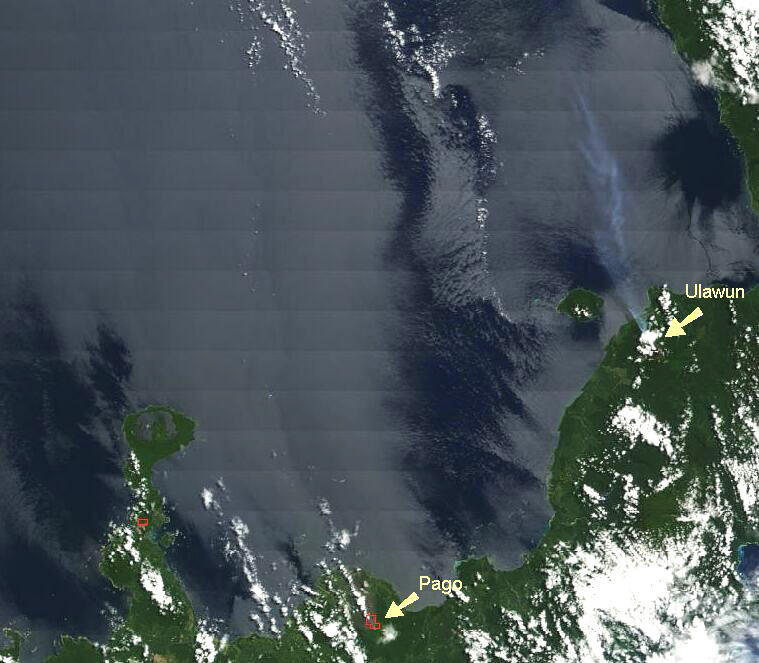
- Dakataua lake on the north tip of the Willaumez Peninsula, left of the Pago volcano. On the right there is a steam plume over the sea from the Ulawun volcano.

Highest point
- Elevation: 400 m (1,300 ft)
- Coordinates: 5°3′20″S 150°6′30″E

Geography
- Location within Papua New Guinea
- Location: New Britain, Papua New Guinea

Geology
- Mountain type: Stratovolcano
- Volcanic arc: Bismarck volcanic arc
- Last eruption: 1895 ± 5 years

The Dakataua Caldera is located at the northern tip of the Willaumez Peninsula, New Britain, Papua New Guinea. The peninsula includes the 350 m high andesitic Mount Makalia stratovolcano. The last major collapse of Dakataua was during the Holocene around 800 CE. The most recent eruption on the caldera's rim was Mount Makalia in 1890, producing lava flows and cinder cones.

== Caldera lake ==
Dakataua's caldera lake is about 76 m above sea level; it has a total surface area of 48 km^{2} (19 sq mi) and a maximum depth of approximately 120 m. It is horseshoe shaped, roughly bisected by a peninsula. It is a freshwater lake that is alkaline with a pH of up to 8.2. It is presumed to be formed by rainwater gradually filling in the caldera. While the lake supports various kinds of life, it does not support any species of fish.

== Migo the Lake Monster ==
There is a folk legend that a monster called the migo (or masali) inhabits the lake. In 1993 a Japanese film crew led by Tetsuo Nagata captured what they claimed to be the migo on film. It is presumed that the creature in the video is actually a saltwater crocodile from the ocean surrounding the lake.
