= 1951 eruption of Mount Lamington =

Volcanic eruption in the Territory of Papua and New Guinea

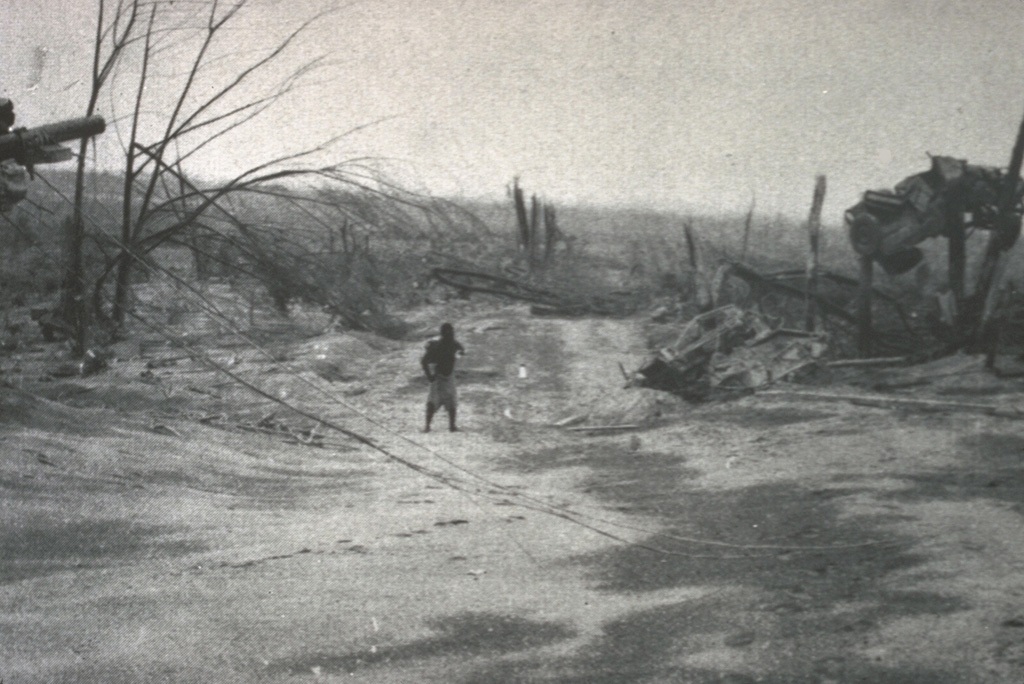
- Destruction left in the wake of the eruption
- Volcano: Mount Lamington
- Start date: January 17, 1951
- Start time: 10:40 PGT
- End date: July 2, 1956
- Type: Plinian, Peléan and Vulcanian
- Location: Oro Province, Territory of Papua and New Guinea (present-day Papua New Guinea); 8°57′S 148°09′E
- VEI: 4
- Deaths: 2,942

Maps
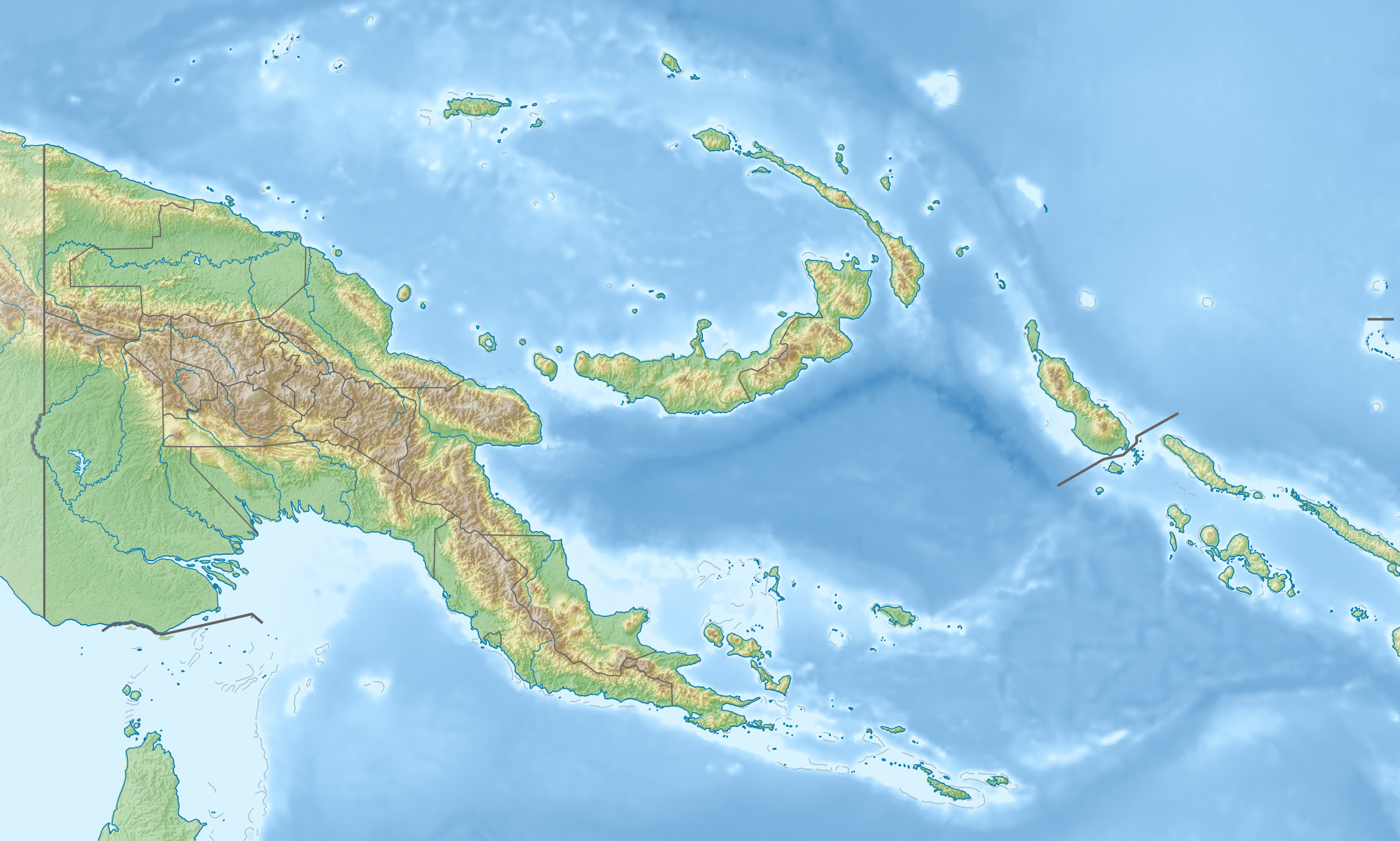

In early January 1951, a series of minor explosions and earthquakes rocked Mount Lamington, a volcano in the Australian-administered Territory of Papua and New Guinea (now in Oro Province, Papua New Guinea). Prior to the eruption, Mount Lamington was not recognized as a volcano due to the absence of historically recorded eruptions and dense vegetation cover. From January 15, volcanic activity intensified, and tall eruption plumes were generated. The largest eruption occurred on the morning of January 21 when a thick black plume of ash rose 15,000 metres (50,000 ft) into the atmosphere. The eruption collapsed a lava dome and produced a lethal pyroclastic flow that killed 2,942 people. In the years after the eruption, new lava domes formed and collapsed in succession. Activity persisted until July 1956. The eruption is the deadliest natural disaster in Australian history, as the region was under the rule of the Government of Australia.

== Tectonic setting ==
Volcanism in Papua New Guinea is due to the ongoing subduction of oceanic crust beneath the island due to plate tectonics. Mount Lamington is situated within the Hydrographers Range; a small, forested coastal mountain range. The mountain range is the remnant of a heavily eroded Quaternary stratovolcano. The dominant rock types are andesite and basaltic andesite. While a majority of the range's eruptive history occurred during the Pleistocene, the presence of cinder cones and craters on the southern flank of the range suggest volcanism also took place during the Holocene. The mountain lies adjacent to the Owen Stanley Range. Nearby volcanoes include Mount Suckling and Mount Victory.

== Volcanology ==
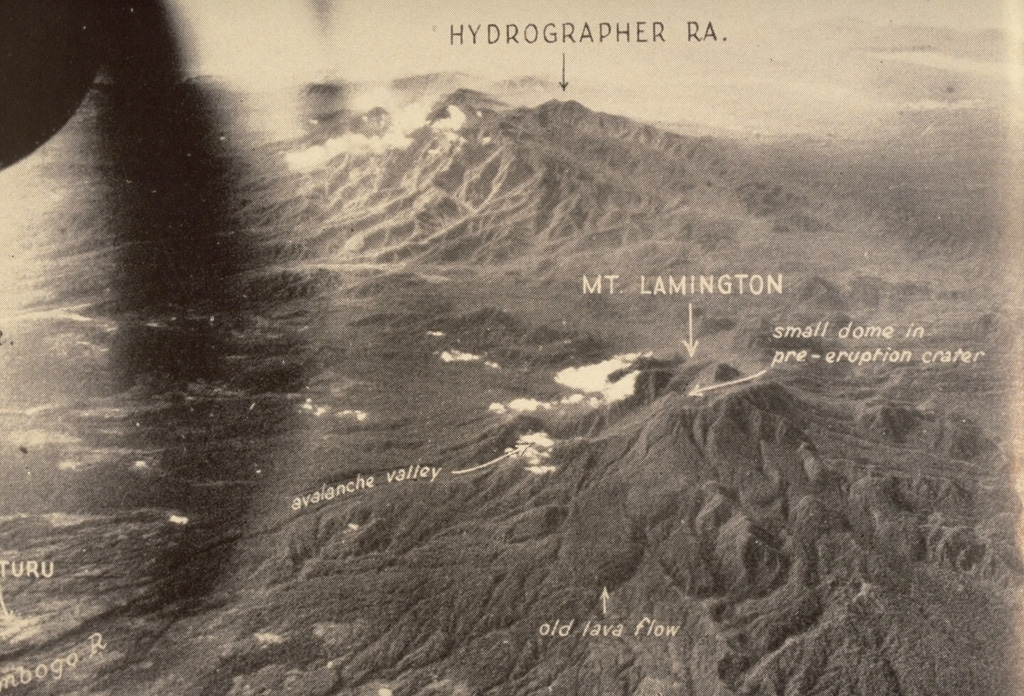
Mount Lamington and the Hydrographers Range are volcanic features

Mount Lamington rises to a height of 1,680 meters above the coastal flats north of the Owen Stanley Range. A summit complex of lava domes and crater remnants rises above a low-angle base of volcaniclastic deposits that are dissected by radial valleys. A prominent broad "avalanche valley" extends northward from the breached crater. The horseshoe-shaped crater was the result of a large sector collapse. It occurred about 20,000 years Before Present, when the volcano was approximately 2,560 metres (8,400 ft) high. A 1,060-metre (3,480 ft) section of the volcanic cone, estimated to be 0.47 cubic kilometres (0.11 cu mi), was destroyed by the collapse during this prehistoric eruption.

Prior to the eruption in 1951, locals did not know that Mount Lamington is an active volcano as the native population had no widespread ancient folklore or stories of activity. The only indication of volcanic activity was a small hot spring on the northern slopes, which most of the native population did not know about. A weak hint of its volcanic nature was a traditional story, related to the volcano's activity, of a lake on the summit which exploded, destroying villages and killing many people. There were some settlements on the flank of the volcano, and the native population regards the mountain as a sacred and spiritual place.

Geologists however, understood that Mount Lamington and the Hydrographers Range are volcanic in origin, and that it was a geologically young feature. Reinout Willem van Bemmelen, a geologist from the Netherlands classified Mount Lamington an active volcano. Only three eruptions were confirmed in the Holocene.

== Events ==
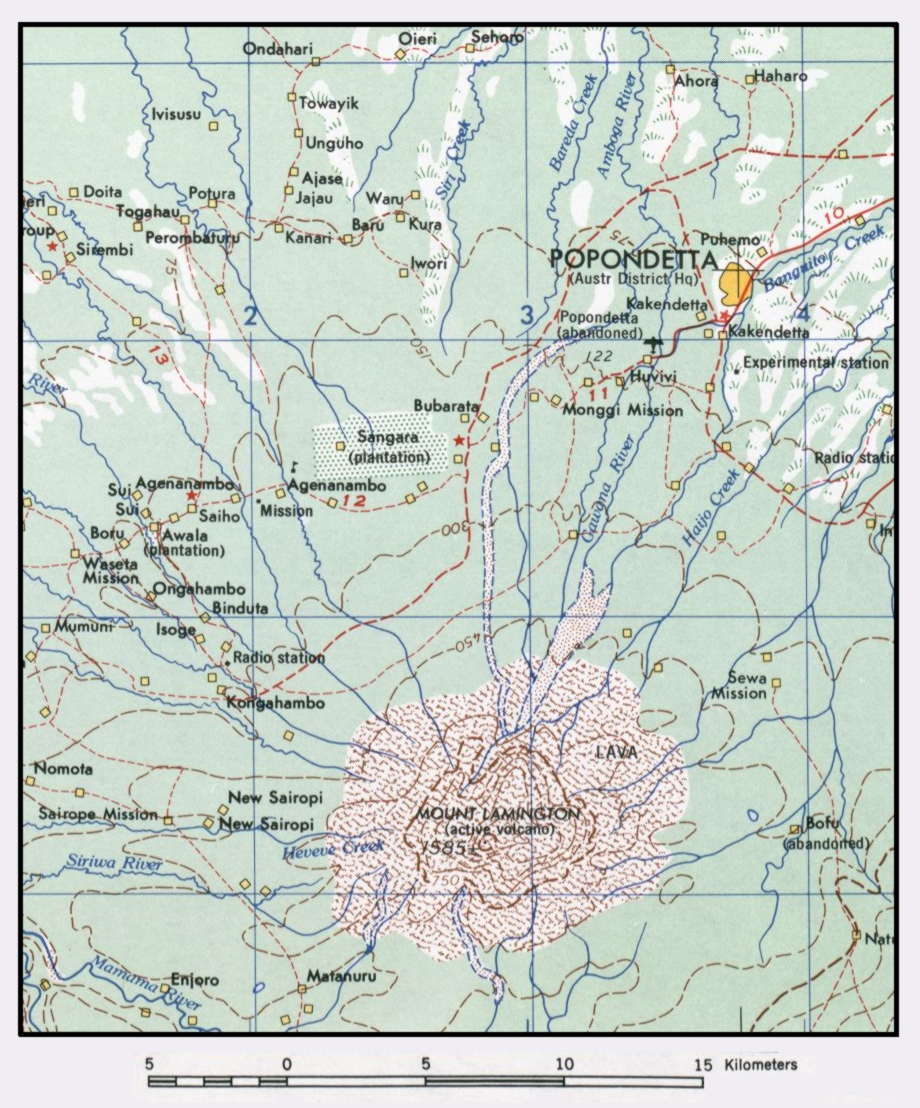
A map of Mount Lamington and its surroundings from 1962

=== Pre–January 21 activity ===
Several inhabitants around Mount Lamington reported earthquakes in early January 1951, and on January 15, there were signs of landslides in the crater wall including streaks of brown in the heavily forested flank. At a rubber plantation in Sangara village, a person reported white smoke or vapour cloud rising from the base of the volcano. Around the crater, vegetation was killed by the intense heat emitted from the ground.

On January 16, a vapour cloud was observed from Higaturu. Large landslides were reported, many destroying the existing vegetation. The entire rainforest around the crater was destroyed by the late afternoon. An earthquake swarm occurred at 16:00. Up to 30 earthquakes were felt till 08:00 on January 17. Stronger earthquakes were felt in Isivita Mission, located northwest of the crater.

On January 17, an ash column rising between some hills and Mount Lamington was observed. The column grew larger as the hours passed. Earthquakes continued to be felt, and there was a red glow observed at night. By January 18, large plumes of dark grey ash ejected from the volcano, and a newly constructed volcanic hill appeared where debris was ejected. According to District Commissioner Cecil Cowley on January 19, these eruptions did not cause fatalities. It generated large columns of ash rising 6,000–8,000 metres (20,000–25,000 ft). On 20 January, the eruption generated a 8,000–9,000 metres (25,000–30,000 ft) column. From Kokoda, it was described as a large black column with shaped similar to a cauliflower. Heavy ashfall occurred on the southern side of the volcano because of the monsoon winds, damaging some Orokaiva settlements.

=== January 21 eruption ===
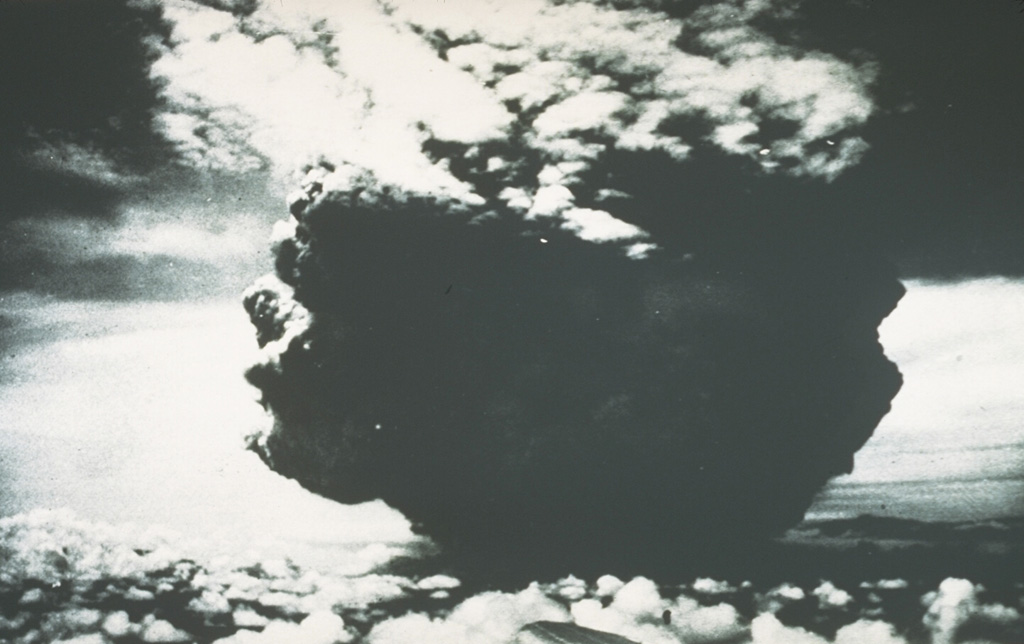
The 21 January eruption photographed from a plane, 40 km (25 mi) northwest

The most violent eruption occurred four days later at 10:40 local time. Occupants on two Qantas Empire Airways flights which flew in close proximity to the erupting volcano reported a large eruption column and base surge of pyroclastic debris. The captain of a Douglas DC-3 flight witnessed a massive continuous column of black smoke erupting from the crater. The column rose over 4,000 metres (14,000 ft), punching through a layer of clouds. In two minutes, the column had risen 12,000 metres (40,000 ft) from the crater, and expanded into a mushroom column. The eruption column reached 15,000 metres (50,000 ft) at its highest. The captain of the DC-3 radioed authorities at Port Moresby about the sequence of events. Another Qantas flight; a de Havilland Dragon bound for Popondetta from Lae, was about to land when its occupants witnessed the side of volcano blow itself apart. A large surge of debris approached the aircraft, forcing its return to Lae.

Changing winds directed the pyroclastic surge northeast, where it was seen at Kokoda. Lightning was observed in the eruption column. Ash, pumice and small rocks fell to the ground. The eruption column was also observed at Eroro, where many residents mistook it for a petrol explosion at Higaturu. A large pyroclastic surge raced towards Isivita Mission; 75 kilometres (47 mi) northwest of the crater. Many panicked residents rushed to the main mission house. The flow, however, ceased in the mission compound. A definitive boundary between the grassy field and thick layer of volcanic material marked the trail of the flow. By 11:30, the eruption column had blocked sunlight. Thunder was heard, and intense lightning was observed.

Awala Plantation near Isivita Mission was spared the worst of the eruption but suffered from extensive ash fall. Much of the rubber, coffee and cocoa crops were devastated. The loss of crops had implications for the local economy. The eruption seriously affected the fish population in rivers. The local population experienced a decline in the aftermath of the eruption. Rainforests were also covered in thick layers of ash, and trees began to topple or break apart due to the weight of ash. Overnight, 18 people perished at Isivita. Higaturu, another town slightly further away, was totally destroyed.

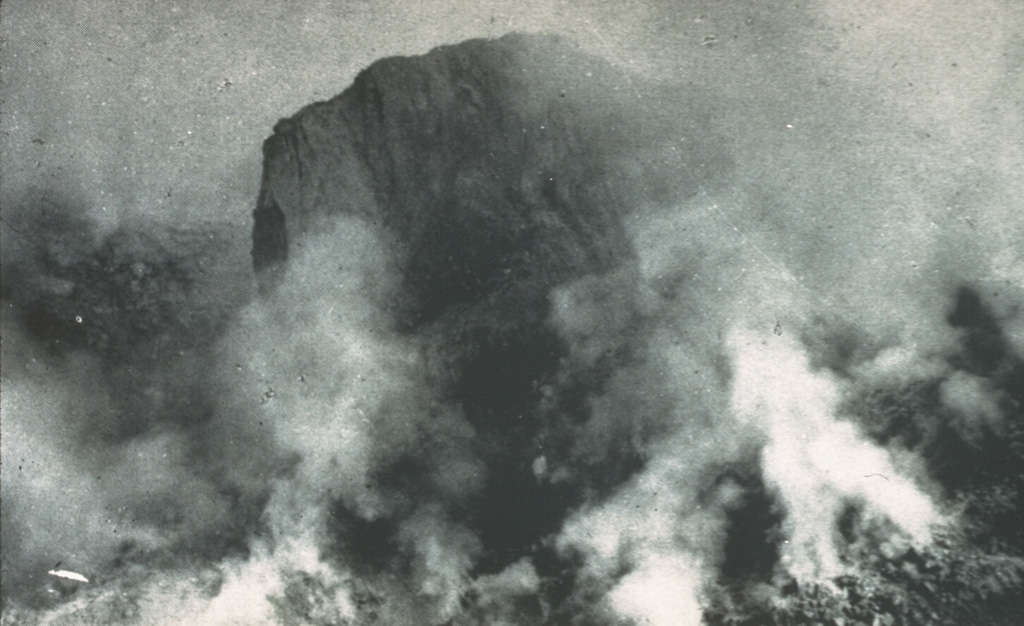
The lava spine emerged from the lava dome, reaching 150 m (490 ft) on 19 August 1951

By the afternoon, many residents with extreme burns from the pyroclastic flow were rescued. Many began to arrive at treatment centers for medical assistance. Survivors described the sounds of agony from burn victims. Some victims experienced total burns to their skins. One burn victim later died. More deaths were anticipated following the eruption, so a large grave was dug. There was a large inflow of seriously burnt victims at the Sangara Plantation. Injured victims were also transported to Popondetta.

The destruction was described as "complete" and comparisons were drawn with a bomb explosion. Trees in the dense tropical rainforest toppled or were pulverized. Nearly every building was destroyed by the flow. The region surrounding Mount Lamington was transformed into a moonscape-like environment. Charred bodies of people attempting to flee the surging flow littered the roads.

=== Post–January 21 activity ===
The post–January 21 eruptive phase consisted of explosive eruptions which produced pyroclastic flows. A large pyroclastic flow was documented on March 5, 1951. After the climactic eruption on January 21, a new lava dome formed in the crater. The new lava dome grew to fill the crater. From 1951 to 1953, new lava domes formed and collapsed, generating more pyroclastic flows. The dome eventually attained a height of 450 meters from the crater floor to its summit and had a volume of 0.2 km^{3} (0.048 cu mi). A lava spine emerged from the dome and grew to a height of 150 m (490 ft). Lava spines continuously formed and were destroyed over a five-year period.

== Scientific study and monitoring ==
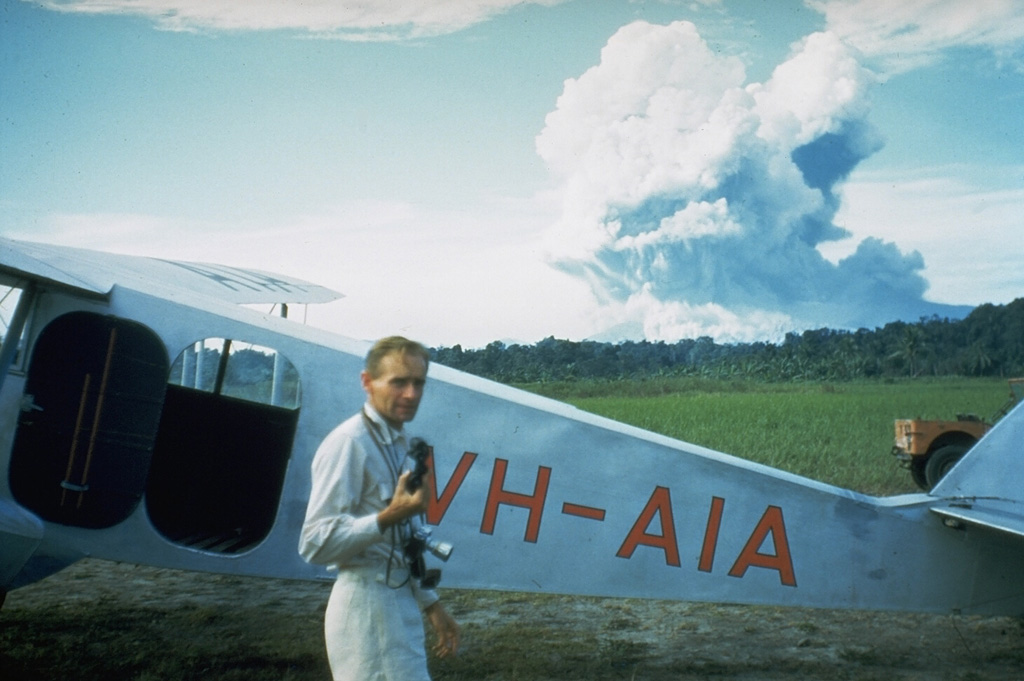
Volcanologist Tony Taylor observing Mount Lamington on 5 February

The eruption rated a four on the Volcanic Explosivity Index scale of zero to eight. This vertical eruption blast was accompanied by a lateral collapse of the volcano flank. At the time of the eruption, volcanologist Tony Taylor was studying the Rabaul caldera, another volcano in Papua New Guinea. He arrived one day after the eruption. Taylor conducted a dangerous on-site investigation to determine the probability of another eruption, including a flight over the erupting crater.

Mount Lamington was continuously monitored due to the potential for future eruptions. Taylor spent two years studying the volcano, where he received support from the Bureau of Mineral Resources, Geology and Geophysics (BMR). Seismologist Bill Langron and geologist John Best also assisted in the scientific study. A de Havilland Mosquito of the No. 87 Squadron RAAF conducted a reconnaissance flight in the affected area. Photographs taken during the flight were used in mapping the devastation's reach and change in topography around Mount Lamington. There were concerns of an imminent eruption of Mount Victory, another volcano near Tufi and Wanigela. An inspection of the volcano suggest there was no threat.

Taylor interpreted that the landslides initially observed were the result of the earthquake swarm or other geological processes. Intense activity occurred in the subsequent days after, including an interpreted Vulcanian eruption on 17 January. That eruption was caused by magma interacting with groundwater. The young hill structure observed via a telescope and initially interpreted by Taylor as a pile of debris, was instead a small lava dome.

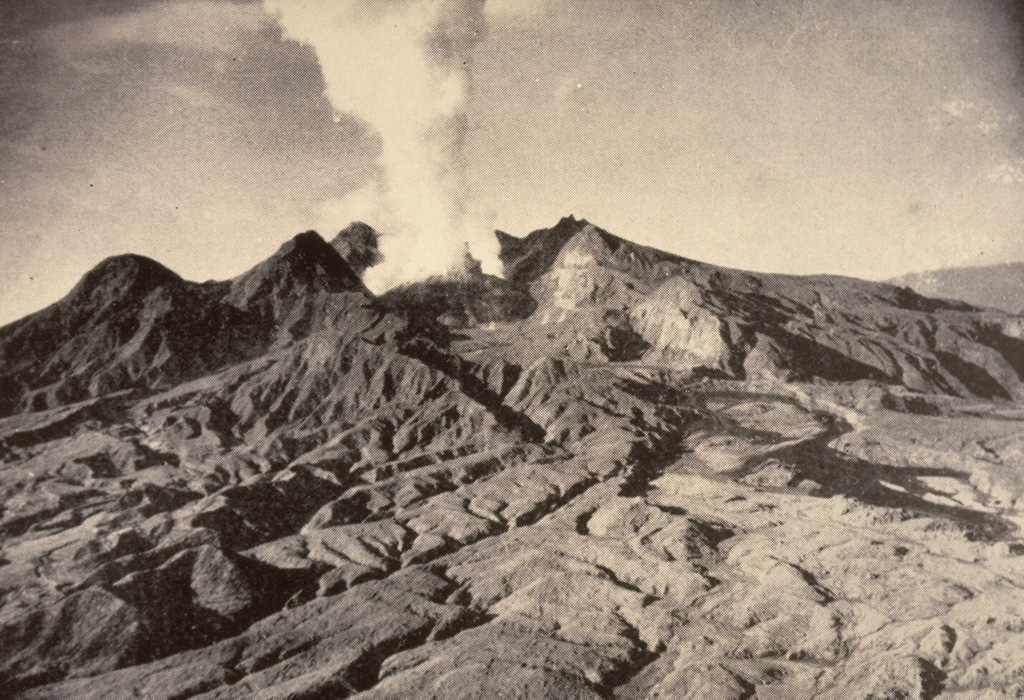
Mount Lamington in February 1951

The large volume of volcanic ash and debris ejected vertically into the atmosphere on 21 January was a Plinian-style eruption. This triggered a debris avalanche with an estimated volume of 0.02–0.04 cubic kilometres (0.0048–0.0096 cu mi) which traveled 8.5 kilometres (5.3 mi). The eruption column formed a large mushroom cloud towering over the summit. Pyroclastic flows surged down the flank of the volcano as the eruption column collapsed. The thick and dense cloud of black ash was described as "like toothpaste from a tube". An approximately 230 km^{2} (89 sq mi) area of dense tropical rainforest around Mount Lamington was devastated.

The pyroclastic flows moved with such velocity, about 135 km (84 mi) per hour, that no humans in the areas of devastation survived. Extreme damage occurred within a 12 km (7.5 mi) radius around the volcano. It traveled northwards for 13 km (8.1 mi) due to the influence of the breached, horseshoe-shaped crater in the north. A second eruption occurred at 19:30, generating an ash cloud almost identical in height as the daytime eruption. This eruption produced a loud sound and heavy ashfall, although no pyroclastic flows were reported.

As far as 3 kilometres (1.9 mi) from the crater, some areas of rainforest were charred. In the areas where charring occurred, the pyroclastic flow was extremely dense. This allowed the flows to retain its extreme temperatures and cause severe scraping in the ground. Hundreds died at Higaturu from the heat of the pyroclastic flows. However, the temperatures were not sufficient for wood to combust and thermally decompose. In one house at Higaturu, a cotton reel and drive belt from a sewing machine remained unaffected. In another house, a plastic lampshade melted and collapsed. Two unburnt violins were also found inside a residence. Penicillin found in a hospital were analyzed and showed that temperatures rose to 200 °C for a period of 1.5–2 minutes.

Only one house remained intact at Higaturu; the rest were obliterated, leaving only the floors intact. A previously straight steel pole on the hospital was severely bent in two places, and one side was eroded by the dense cloud. The discovery of a jeep hanging on the remains of a tree suggested vortices formed within the dense flow. Debris were picked up and flung into structures. Taylor concluded that winds inside the flow reached 75 kilometres (47 mi) per hour.

== Casualties ==
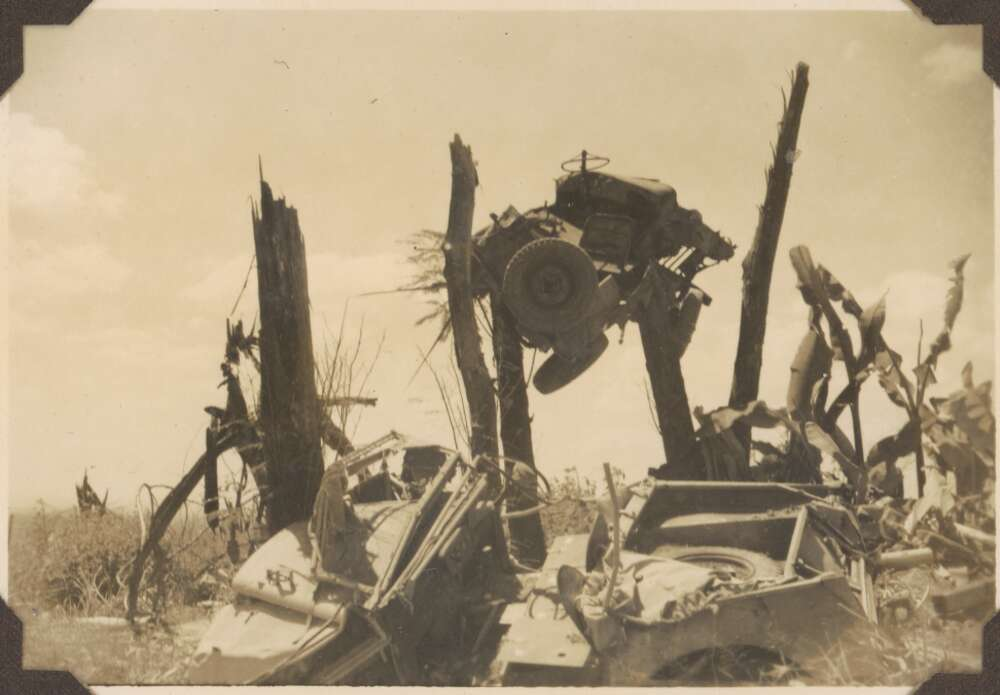
The force of the blast left the remains of a jeep suspended on a tree

Rough estimates of the death toll appeared as early as 23 January which suggested 4,000 deaths. A thorough count did not happen because many bodies were buried within days to weeks of the disaster. Port Moresby officials conveyed to the Department of External Territories about 3,466 people dead or missing. An administration official in the city investigated the local population from August to October and concluded that 2,942 people died, including 35 mainland Australians missing and presumed dead.

Many victims resided in the village of Sangara, who were Orokaiva people. Up to 94 percent of the population may have perished. Victims caught in the pyroclastic flows suffered swollen, exfoliation and hemorrhage in their respiratory system after ingesting hot volcanic material. The condition of bodies also suggested fatal asphyxiation. Rigor mortis was observed; many in a sitting or kneeling position due to thermal-induced muscle stiffness. The intact bodies indicated victims did not die from flying objects or collapsed structures. Similar fatal conditions were also observed in victims of the Mount Pelée and La Soufrière eruptions in 1902.

At refugee centers, poor hygiene led to health issues; three people eventually died, including a child who succumbed to pneumonia. An unknown number of people experienced psychological distress from the disaster and no counselling services were provided. Anthropologist Marie Reay who was among the survivors experienced a mental breakdown in 1952. Some schoolchildren also struggled with grief after the disaster. An Orokaiva woman died from suicide after finding the remains of her husband and child following the eruption. The eruption left a further 5,000 homeless.

=== Survivors ===
Initially, 40 people were found alive and brought to a hospital but 22 died within 24 hours. There were a number of people who were severely burnt but survived the pyroclastic surge. Near the village of Amonikiarota, a woman suffered burns by the tiny particles of lava that struck her skin. The thin cotton dress she wore had shielded much of her body from the advancing hot clouds. Some furry animals including a puppy and mouse also survived.

One native man and two others attempted to flee the eruption along the Ambogo river, but the pyroclastic flow knocked them into the river. After being knocked unconscious for a moment, he was able to recover. When he resurfaced and attempted to breathe, his throat was burned. He sank into the river just when the highest temperatures of the surging flow were passing above and resurfaced later. Of the three, only the man survived (a second initial survivor died from her injuries).

== Response ==
Preparation for the eruption on January 21 was insufficient. Despite the precursor events of 15 to 17 January, little was known if news of the events reached administration headquarters in Port Moresby. At the time of the disaster, there was no administration to handle volcanic disaster, hence, no evacuation plan for the region around Mount Lamington. District Commissioner Cecil Cowley requested authorities in Port Moresby and a volcanologist to examine the situation, but his requests were never met. Volcanologist Tony Taylor said despite the intense activity leading up to the eruption, authorities were incapable of interpreting them as warning signs and managing the crisis.

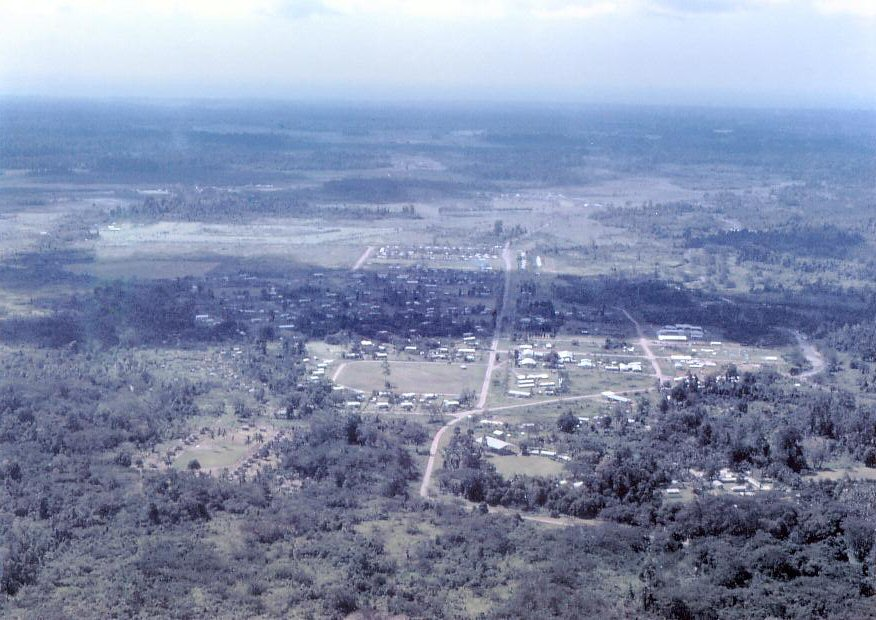
Popondetta was the center of relief efforts in the aftermath of the eruption

The administration in Port Moresby was briefed of the disaster on the morning of January 22. A relief and recovery mission was established in response. Aircraft delivered excess food, tents, medical and other supplies to the affected regions effectively. At Lae, the Huon, an administrative ship, sailed overnight with medical staff and emergency needs to Popondetta. Rescuers found very few survivors in the affected area—there were more dead bodies recovered. The injured were airlifted from Popondetta to Port Moresby for treatment. Displaced residents were relocated to refugee camps which provided with basic needs.

An undamaged road linking Gona to Kokoda which ran north of Mount Lamington served an important role in the rescue and recovery process. The road helped with the mobilization of injured victims, emergency responders and evacuees. Volcanic ashfall continued to disrupt response operations in the hours that came, and the airport at Port Moresby ceased operations until the morning of 23 January.

Two RAAF C-47 Dakotas deployed by the Australian government assisted in the response. The Australian Red Cross also donated blood plasma for injured victims, and food, medical supplies and other basic needs.

Two mass burials and memorial services were held in the days immediately aftermath of the eruption, with an Anglican minister and Catholic priest cooperating on each, overlooking the devastation.

== Aftermath ==
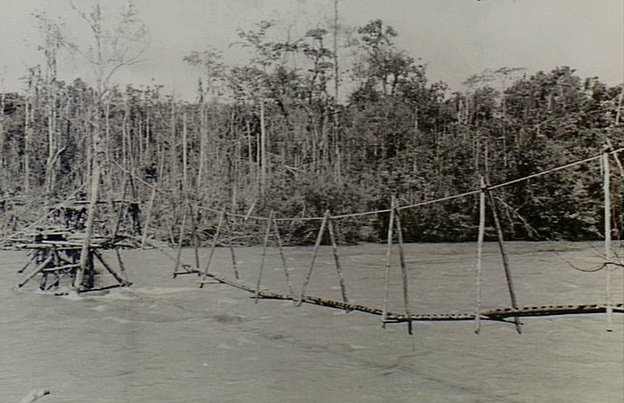
A rope bridge linked Wairopi and the opposite bank of the river

An evacuation site at Wairopi was formed within days of the eruption on the floodplain of the Kumusi River, along a road that linked Kokoda and Popondetta. The site was located far from Mount Lamington so there was no volcanic threat. The Kumusi River supplied water for drinking and cleaning. There were possibly over 4,000 refugees at Wairopi—mainly because many were using the road to leave the affected area and this was an effort to concentrate recovery efforts. Refugees included the Orokaiva, Omie, Koiarian-speaking groups, and some members of the Sangara people.

Whooping cough was still persistent among the population as the outbreak occurred before the eruption. There was a heightened risk of dysentery, typhoid, tuberculosis and pneumonia. Medical workers also had to deal with malaria. Due to these health concerns, immunization programs were introduced. Medical supplies were brought to the site by road after being flown into Kokoda. Food supplies such as rice and canned meat were air-dropped, and there was a farm to grow vegetables.

Wairopi was at risk of flooding in February when mudflows around the volcano blocked river channels with silt. A survey was carried out at the source of the Kumusi River. The Mamama River, its main tributary, carried large quantities of debris from the southern flanks of Mount Lamington. Logs from the devastated vegetation blocked parts of the river. Flooding at Wairopi occurred on 8 February, and again on 19 February, washing away the evacuation site. The village of Ajeka on the opposite bank was flooded.

A new evacuation site, Ilimo, was established west of Wairopi. Along the road, the site was 6.5 km (4.0 mi) away from Wairopi and closer to Kokoda. Local villages accommodated roughly 2,000 refugees. The other 2,000 refugees walked to Ilimo by road while the sick and frail were ferried by jeeps. Additional refugees from Oro Bay also moved to Ilimo. Heavy rain disrupted the construction of infrastructure. Homes and other facilities including a temporary hospital were constructed. Villages and refugees participated in the construction. The new site supported agriculture, education and health programs. By the end of February, more than 3,840 and 3,150 injections for whooping cough and typhoid were administered, respectively. Health measures were taken to prevent diseases from spreading.

Evacuation sites were also located at Eroro, Oro Bay, Popondetta and Inonda.

=== Rehousing ===
Administration officials and displaced locals agreed that the devastated areas were unsuitable for rebuilding. Building new villages along a road linking Waseta and Popondetta was preferred by the administration. Known as Saiho, these villages would allow the Orokaiva people to access native lands. The villages were intended to mirror Kokoda—large communities with an approximate population of 400. Under the supervision of administration officers, the native male population constructed these villages. A hospital comprising 11 wards was also built. Most of the refugees had been relocated to Saiho—by mid-May, there were only 530 people at Ilimo. Most of the population at Popondetta and Inonda sites had left. The evacuation site Ilimo closed on 1 June. Evacuation sites at Oro Bay and Eroro had been emptied by May.

=== Recovery of flora ===
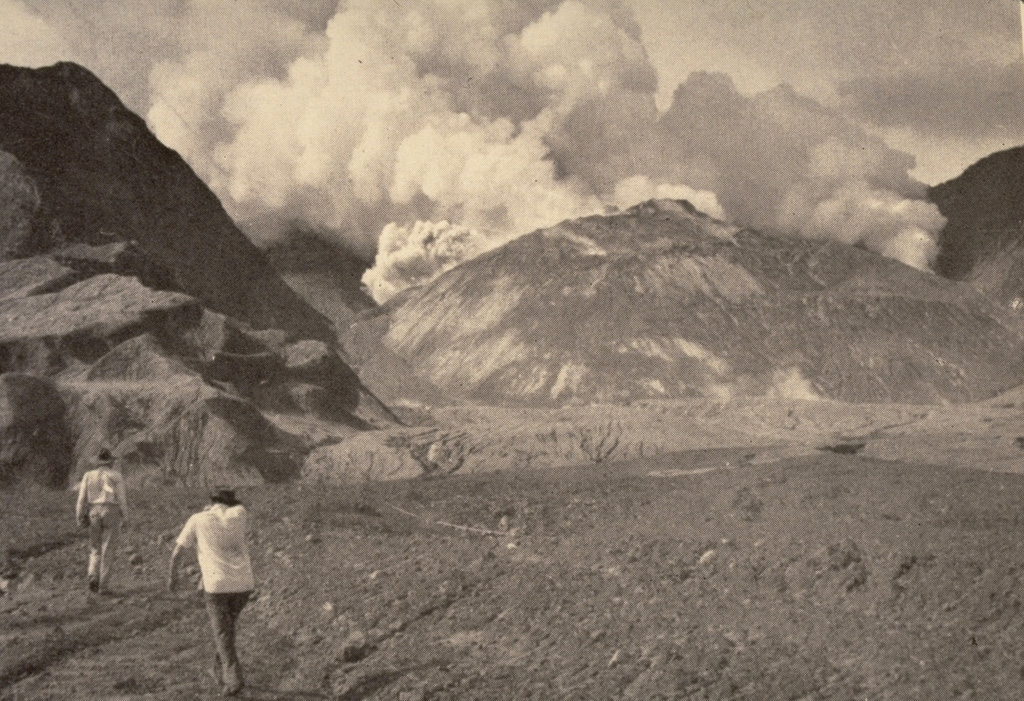
Explosions occur behind the lava dome

Vegetation quickly blossomed as volcanic activity abated. Neurospora fungus was discovered in the pyroclastic deposit zone three days after the eruption. After six weeks, the population declined until it was a rarity, occasionally growing on logs buried under debris.

Plants cultivated by the locals also survived the devastation. The severely damaged coffee and rubber tree plantations regrew and were eventually sufficient to sustain the native population. Tubers were among the first plants to appear, followed by native grasses and rainforest trees. Less than a week after the eruption, taro plants began blossoming in some villages. Root vegetables including yam and sweet potato, and banana plants started to grow two months later. The regrown plants became a primary source of sustenance for the population.

Grasses began to cover the mountainside by early 1952. Trees began to regrow around this time, and by the end of the year, some were 15 feet (4.6 m) high. The volcanic crater became increasingly inaccessible due to the tall grasses and dense vegetation. There were no vegetation on the smouldering lava dome until 1953 when grasses began to grow.

=== Memorial and legacy ===
The Mount Lamington Memorial Cemetery opened on 24 November 1952 at Popondetta by the Australian colonial government. Bodies of the Orokaiva people, Europeans and local policemen were buried. At Higaturu, bodies were exhumed and reburied. The memorial cemetery featured a large white Christian cross in the ground. The opening ceremony was officiated by Minister for Territories Paul Hasluck.

Fourteen awards in recognition of services were announced by the Central Chancery of the Orders of Knighthood in April 1952. The awards were approved by Queen Elizabeth II. Tony Taylor was presented the George Cross. Awards were also presented to missionaries, pilots and administration staff.

== See also ==
- List of volcanic eruptions by death toll
- List of volcanoes in Papua New Guinea
