= Mount Trafalgar =

Mountain in Papua New Guinea

- Location within Papua New Guinea

Highest point
- Coordinates: 9°09′S 149°10′E

Geography
- Location: Oro Province, Papua New Guinea

Mount Trafalgar is an extinct volcano on the north east coast of Oro Province, Papua New Guinea. The mountain is a major andesite volcano, with the magma known for its high levels of Nickel and Chromium. Captain John Moresby named the mountain after the naval battle of Trafalgar.

Hydrographers Range, Mount Lamington, and Mount Victory are three other large Quaternary stratovolcanoes in south-eastern New Guinea.

== Name ==
Mount Trafalgar is named after the famous naval battle of Trafalgar, which was fought off the coast of Spain in 1805 between the British Royal Navy and the combined fleets of France and Spain.
