= 8th Field Survey Squadron =

8 Field Survey Squadron
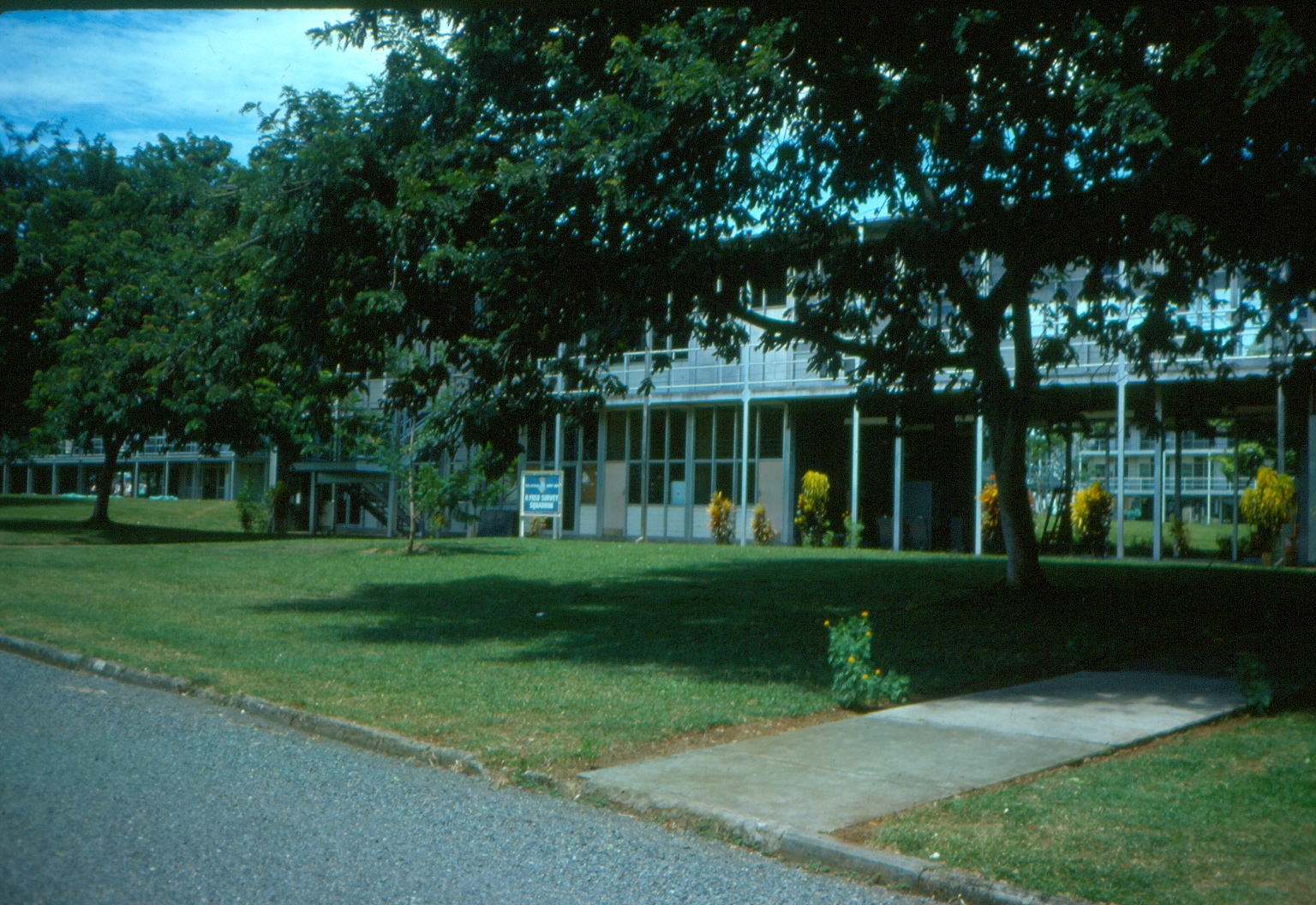
- Headquarters 8 Fd Svy Sqn at Moem Barracks, Cape Moem, Wewak
- Active: 1 December 1971 – 1 December 1995
- Country: Australia
- Branch: Australian Army
- Type: Unit
- Role: Military survey
- Mottos: Videre Parare Est (Latin: "To See is to Prepare") (Note: The motto is that of the Royal Australian Survey Corps and was approved in 1965.)
- Anniversaries: Unit birthday 1 December
- Engagements: 8 Field Survey Squadron was not awarded Battle honours.

Insignia
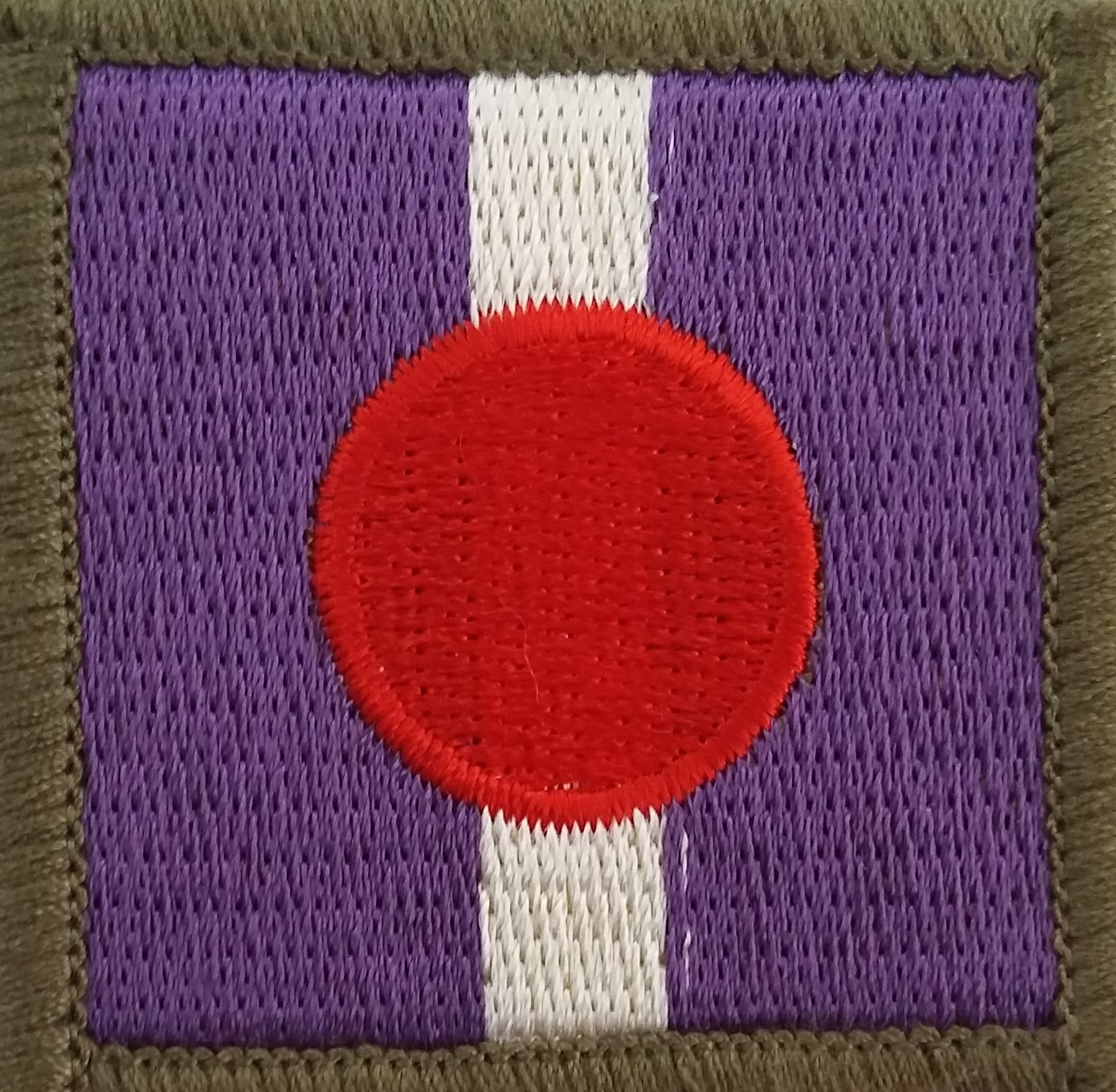
- 8 Fd Svy Sqn Unit colour patch

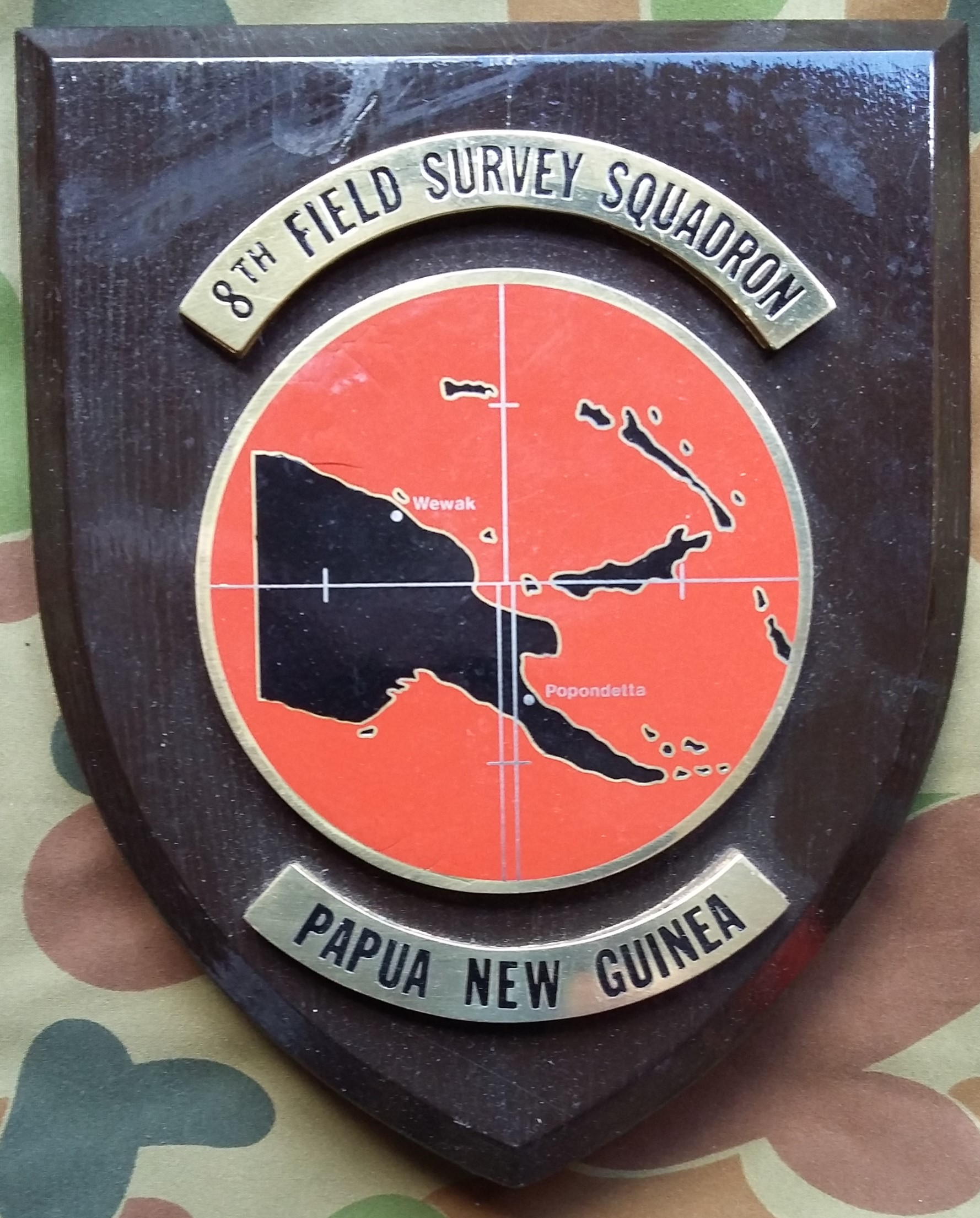
- Unit plaque

8 Field Survey Squadron (8 Fd Svy Sqn) was a unit of the Australian Army and the Royal Australian Survey Corps (RA Svy), being raised in December 1971 at Popondetta, Territory of Papua New Guinea and disbanded twenty-four years later on 1 December 1995 in Port Moresby, Papua New Guinea (PNG). The squadron's initial role was to establish geodetic survey control, establish topographic survey control for mapping, compile and field complete preliminary topographic maps, and conduct other surveys and mapping including acquiring air photography. In 1980 the role changed to provide support and advice to the PNG Defence Force and PNG National Mapping Bureau on all aspects of survey and mapping and to provide liaison support for Australian based survey units on operations in the country.

The unit was based at Popondetta in the Northern District (January 1972 – June 1975), Wewak in the Sepik District (June 1975 – June 1980) and the capital Port Moresby (June 1980 – December 1995). Although based in these towns, elements of the unit operated across the entire country from the western border with Indonesia to Bougainville in the east. In the decade prior to 1972 most of the field survey effort was concentrated on the main island having been conducted by Australian based units deployed there for a few months in most years. Initially the focus of 8 Fd Svy Sqn work was in the islands to the east. The squadron served continuously in PNG from it being a Territory of Australia, through self government in December 1973, to Independence on 16 September 1975 and then for another 20 years. The unit remained a part of the Australian Army (not part of the Papua New Guinea Defence Force) and after Independence was under the auspices of Australia's Defence Cooperation Program.

Unit accommodation at Popondetta in the Northern District was in the recently vacated District Engineers Office (Royal Australian Engineers) which had moved to Mendi in the Southern Highlands. When the unit moved to Wewak in July 1975 it was accommodated in Moem Barracks on Cape Moem, the home of the 2nd Battalion, Pacific Islands Regiment. With the 1:100,000 mapping programme complete in 1980, the unit relocated to Port Moresby.

Like any military unit there were often miscellaneous tasks to be done. Popondetta is located between Kokoda and the Gona-Sanananda-Buna Second World War battlefield sites and large airbase complexes around Dobodura. The unit was often called upon to assist with Explosive Ordnance Demolition tasks in those areas. Mount Lamington, a volcano which exploded in 1951 killing more than 3000 people up to 14 km away, is 20 km south-west of Popondetta. One of the daily duties of the squadron was to observe the vertical angle, by theodolite, to the mountaintop to compute any apparent change in height. Results were reported to the Rabaul Vulcanology Observatory.

== Unit structure and its people ==
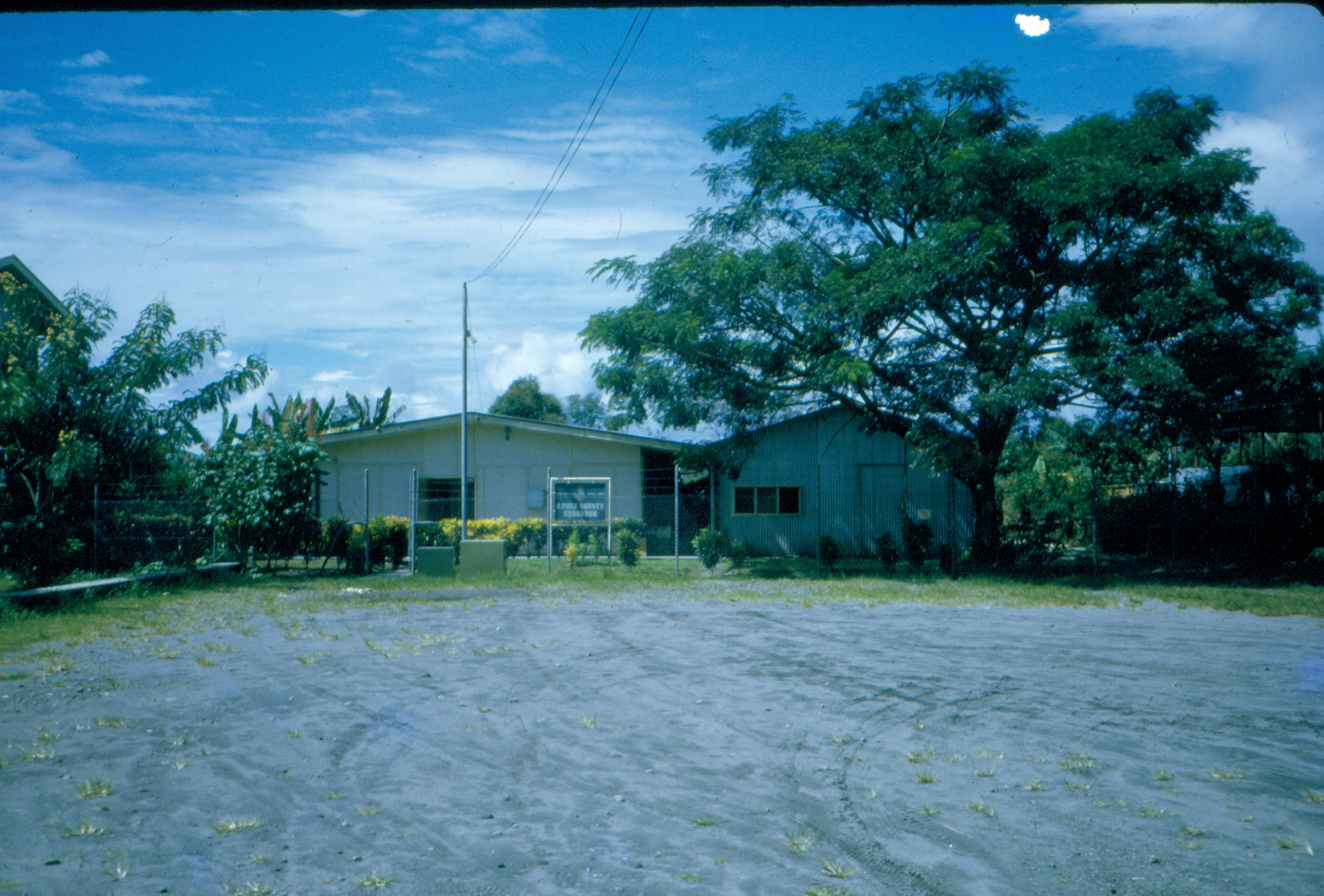
Headquarters 8 Fd Svy Sqn at Popondetta

8 Fd Svy Sqn was raised at Popondetta in December 1971 with an establishment of two officers and sixteen other ranks (1 x Major Officer Commanding, 1 x Lieutenant Troop Officer and Second-in-Command, 1 x Staff Sergeant QuarterMaster Sergeant, 1 x Sergeant Chief Clerk, 1 x Staff Sergeant Topographic Surveyor, 1 x Sergeant Topographic Surveyor, 4 x Corporal Topographic Surveyor, 6 x Sapper Topographic Surveyor, 1 x Private Cook, 1 x Sapper Storeman). The first parade at full strength was 19 January 1972. The establishment increased in the next few years with an average of three officers and twenty-five other ranks from 1973 to 1980. The personnel establishment reduced to six all ranks when the squadron moved from Wewak to Port Moresby.

Officers Commanding

- Major AW Laing (December 1971 – January 1974)
- Major BE Dalton (January 1974 – April 1975)
- Major KJ Murphy (April 1975 – December 1976)
- Major PH Woods BEM (December 1976 – July 1980)
- Captain PM Bion (July 1980 – October 1980)
- Captain RL Roche (October 1980 – December 1982)
- Major RW Cooper (December 1982 – December 1984)
- Major SJ Vote (December 1984 – January 1987)
- Major EP Ralston (January 1987 - January 1989)
- Major MM Byrne (January 1989 - January 1991)
- Major JW Gregs (January 1991 - January 1993)
- Major CF Parkinson AM (January 1993 – 1 December 1995)

Two 8 Fd Svy Sqn officers, Major Alex Laing and Lieutenant Simon Lemon, were later promoted Colonel and appointed Director of Survey Army Headquarters and head of Royal Australian Survey Corps.

Four members of the squadron were awarded the PNG Independence Medal.

Postings for single and married male soldiers with families were normally for one and two years respectively. For most wives and families, life there especially in the very tropical and small town Popondetta was something which they had never experienced before and pre-arrival information did not quite cover reality. There were few of the conveniences and supports of home, but partners formed their own groups and integrated with the community which was essential during the long and frequent absences of their surveyor soldiers.

== Background and origins ==
Early Charting, Mapping and Surveys

Spain voyaged along some of the north coast of Papua New Guinea in 1545. One hundred years later in 1643 the Dutch navigator Abel Tasman charted part of the coast from New Ireland west along the north coast of New Britain and New Guinea on his way to Batavia (Jakarta) from his journey of exploration and charting including Tasmania and New Zealand. By the turn of the 20th century Great Britain, Germany and France had produced coastal charts mainly for marine navigation for trade, commerce and exploration. Some charts included basic plans of key points around ports, coastal towns and plantations. In the First World War, Germany surrendered German New Guinea mandated in 1899, including New Britain, New Ireland and Bougainville to Australia and military surveyors and draughtsman as part of the Australian Naval and Military Expeditionary Force worked as part of land administration under the direction of military officers.

Second World War

In the Second World War it was not until Japan attacked and captured Rabaul on New Britain on 23 January 1942 that much emphasis was placed on surveys and maps for military purposes in the Territories of Papua and New Guinea. Existing surveys and maps were mainly about government administration, mining, agriculture and forestry. A state of emergency was proclaimed on 27 January 1942 including the compulsory callup of civilians. The Army's New Guinea Force issued orders for raising a New Guinea Survey Section of twenty-five officers and men in March 1942, under the command of Lieutenant EC O'Reilly a New Guinea surveyor. The men were mainly 'old New Guinea hands', some of them being surveyors and members of the New Guinea Volunteer Rifles and others from the Queensland 49th Infantry Battalion Intelligence Section and some suitably qualified civilians. In early July 1942 the Survey Section was reinforced by a thirty-three man all volunteer group of the 3rd Aust Field Survey Company RAE from Victoria, retitled 2nd Aust Field Survey Section and Captain John Herridge appointed Officer Commanding. The section had field survey and draughting elements and limited one colour sun-dyeline printing. Most colour maps and larger print runs were sent to 2/1 Army Topo Svy Coy (Toowoomba) for rapid cartographic finalisation and printing. One of the original officers, Lieutenant Noel (Gerry) Owers a New Guinea surveyor, was given the tasks of surveys for installations and roads.

The Japanese landed at Gona-Buna on 21 July, had captured Kokoda on 29 July and were advancing in force towards Port Moresby. On 15 August, Owers and two sub-sections (16 men total) commenced the task of blazing a jeep road forward of Iiolo across the Owen Stanley Ranges to Kokoda as an alternate route to the footpath Kokoda Trail for supply of forward troops and evacuating the sick and wounded. On occasions the two survey parties had to evade the Japanese advance and surprised front-line Australian infantry patrols who were not aware that the surveyors were forward of them. After the Japanese were stopped within sight of Port Moresby at Ioribaiwa Ridge and the Australian advance started, the need for the road reduced as air transport improved, and the impossible task, at an impossible time, in impossible terrain was finally abandoned. That road has never been built. The work of Owers' parties was honoured by naming the intersection where his track departed from the mule track down to Uberi on the Kokoda Trail, as Owers Corner. The priority then changed to surveys and standard and special mapping for the advance through Kokoda and preparation for the assaults and defeat of the Japanese at Gona-Sanananda-Buna in early-1943. The other priority area was the Port Moresby Defence Area and the coastal strip south-east towards Milne Bay. The section was again reinforced on 29 October with a draft of seventeen men from 3 Aust Fd Svy Coy RAE then at Gymp ie. It was not until near the end of 1942 that other Australian or American field survey units were sent to New Guinea with elements of 2/1 Aust Army Topographic Survey Company AIF and 3 Aust Fd Svy Coy AIF in Port Moresby and detachments deployed.

In January 1943 the section was retitled 8th Aust Field Survey Section AIF. In March a sub-section flew into Wau as part of Kanga Force remaining there for more than six months in direct support of the combat troops in the Wau-Bulolo-Salamaua areas. All methods of field survey were used, much based on the urgency of the need: astronomy, triangulation, theodolite and chain traverse, plane-tabling, compass traverse, levelling, trigonometric heighting, barometry, intersection of prominent features behind the enemy to improve artillery targeting. A narrow triangulation chain was carried from the astronomic datum at Wau, north through Bulolo into the Markham Valley in anticipation of the Australian attacks on Japanese held Lae. In October the sub-section was to be relieved and they walked out 110 km to the south coast on the Wau-Bulldog road and then by steamer to Port Moresby. After sixteen months of active service 8 Aust Fd Svy Sect was absorbed as No 2 Field Section of 6th Aust Army Topographic Survey Company and moved to Australia.

On 19 October 1943, General D MacArthur, Commander-in-Chief, South West Pacific Area, highly commended 2/1 Aust Army Topo Svy Coy AIF, 3 Aust Fd Svy Coy AIF, a detachment 69th US Engr Topo Coy and 8 Aust Fd Svy Sect AIF for their worthy efforts in supporting the campaigns: Kokoda, Milne Bay, Gona-Sanananda-Buna, Wau-Salamaua, Lae and the Huon Peninsula. "Great technical difficulties were surmounted in producing and distributing maps and photomaps covering more than twelve thousand square miles in time for operations, from combat type photography never before used in this theatre. Astronomic locations vital to the success of the other Allied mapping efforts were obtained under conditions of hardship and grave difficulties of transportation and, upon occasions, considerable risk. This untiring effort to provide the combat units with the maps needed when they were needed, from the material at hand, reflects great credit upon the officers and men of these organisations". Together Australian and United States Army survey units produced nearly 400 surveyed maps for military operations in Papua, New Guinea, New Britain, New Ireland and Bougainville.

Post-Second World War

The end of the war saw the cessation of most topographic surveys, except for economic development projects, although it was known that there were large areas where mapping was terribly inadequate with errors of tens of miles in position and thousands of feet in height. Many aircraft were lost during the war because of the state of air charting.

From the mid-1950s geodetic surveys of PNG were once again a high priority for the United States and Australian Governments initially the islands to the north-east which had been occupied by Japanese forces during the war. The geodetic survey commenced with New Britain (Project Xylon 1954–55) and New Ireland/New Hanover/New Britain/Green /Dyaul/Tabar/Lihir/Tanga/Anir Islands and the Duke of York group (Project Cutlass 1956–57) ship-to-shore triangulation surveys conducted jointly by New Guinea Field Survey Unit (RA Svy), raised for these operations with men mainly from Topographic Squadron (Topo Sqn) AHQ Survey Regiment, and US Army Map Service. These operations were particularly arduous, being eleven to fifteen months long.

A cornerstone of the high quality scale 1:100,000 topographic line maps produced of the entire country in the 1970s was the geodetic survey on which the topographic survey was based. The high order astronomic/triangulation/trilateration network through the Papua and New Guinea highlands was undertaken by Australia's Division of National Mapping (DNM) 1962–1965. At the same time (1962 and 1963) Topo Sqn AHQ Svy Regt undertook a high order coastal traverse around mainland Papua and New Guinea with intersections to the DNM highlands survey when the beacons were visible. The rapid progress of surveys in the 1960s would not have been possible if it was not for the technological development of the microwave electromagnetic distance measurement man-portable system Tellurometer and using helicopters capable of positioning and resupplying survey parties on high altitude survey stations between 10,000 feet and 15,000 feet above sea level. In 1963 the Australian Government was very concerned about the land border with Indonesia an area very poorly mapped. RA Svy used a new Radar Airborne Profile Recorder to map the border area which required additional horizontal and vertical control such that height contours could be mapped. In 1964, Topo Sqn AHQ Svy Regt undertook a three-year program of topographic survey control for scale 1:100,000 mapping of a three degree longitude band east of the land border. Horizontal control was by trilateration network using a new airborne electromagnetic distance measurement system, Aerodist MRC2, connected to the high order surveys established by RA Svy and DNM 1962 -1965. Mixed results were achieved with mapping photography of the border area in the 1960s. At the same time a US Air Force airborne High Frequency Ranging and Navigation (HIRAN) trilateration network measuring long lines between ground stations connected Australia, Papua, New Guinea, New Britain, New Ireland and Buka (Bougainville) to a wider South West Pacific Survey to the north-east. All of these surveys contributed to the 1966 Australian geodetic network adjustment and the resulting coordinate set in the Australian Geodetic Datum 1966. Australia had decided to map the entire Territory at scale 1:100,000 and control surveys for the remainder of mainland PNG were taken up on operations from four to nine months long by Northern Command Field Survey Unit/1 Fd Svy Sqn (Brisbane) mainly using Aerodist MRC2 in 1969 and 1970, and by 4 Fd Svy Sqn (Adelaide) mainly using Aerodist MRB3/201 (computer assisted) from 1972 to 1974 and portable Transit Doppler satellite (US Navy navigation satellites) AN/PRR-14 Geodetic Receiver (Geoceivers) in 1974. In 1970 a British Royal Engineer Survey Troop was attached to 1 Fd Svy Sqn. Vertical (height) control for the mapping was a combination of trigonometric heighting, barometric heighting by Army Sioux helicopter, levelling with connections to sea level and WREMAPS II Airborne Profile Recorder (APR).

By the end of the 1960s there remained an important need for a permanent Army field survey presence in the Territory and 8 Fd Svy Sqn was raised as an Australian Regular Army unit in December 1971. The largest part of the unit's work was to complete the geodetic and topographic surveys of all parts of the Territory, with a focus on the islands to the east, acquire spot and substitute air photography and field complete the 278 preliminary scale 1:100,000 topographic line maps covering the entire country. Other programs included large scale urban orthophotomaps of the key towns and airfields and working with the Royal Australian Navy on hydrographic surveys and beach surveys of much of the coastline. All five field survey squadrons (1,2, 4 and 5 in Australia and 8 in PNG) compiled maps on photogrammetric stereo-plotters using mainly Skai Piksa photography; and Army Survey Regiment (Bendigo) photogrammetrically triangulated the air photography for minor control for map compilation, compiled maps from air photography using photogrammetric stereo-plotters, cartographically completed and printed the maps. The scale 1:100,000 mapping programme was completed in 1980. At the same time Army Survey Regiment cartographically derived and printed scale 1:250,000 Joint Operations Graphic – Ground (JOG) and the companion JOG – Air were completed in 1982. In the 1970s up to 60% of the RA Svy capability was engaged on PNG surveys and mapping.

The second cornerstone of the success of the survey and mapping programmes was the high altitude (40,000 feet) medium scale mapping photography (Army Wild RC-10 cameras mainly 88.5 mm focal length – superwide angle), flown by No. 2 Squadron RAAF Canberra bombers on Operation Skai Piksa. Skai Piksa completed 90 percent of national coverage, mostly cloud free, in the first year 1973 and completed the main task by the end of 1975. Additional Skai Piksa photography was flown in 1981. RA Svy topographic surveyors planned the photography flight lines and provided quality assessments to ensure that the photography met the high technical standards for the subsequent mapping processes. The Corps also acquired substitute photography in some cloud areas after Operation Skai Piksa.

On 26 June 1980 the Australian High Commissioner for PNG presented a complete three volume Atlas of the maps in the 1:100,000 series to the prime minister of PNG, Sir Julius Chan. The preface to this atlas states, in part: "The Royal Australian Survey Corps during and since World War II has been engaged almost continuously upon a programme of Survey and Mapping in PNG. The work has been undertaken with the assistance and co-operation of all Arms and Services of the Australian Defence Force, Papua New Guinea Defence Force, members of the National Mapping Bureau PNG, Division of National Mapping Australia, Royal Engineers Survey (UK), Royal Air Force (UK), Army Map Service United States Army, United States Navy, United States Air Force and numerous expatriate civilians in PNG and PNG Nationals who assisted survey parties in the field on a variety of supporting tasks in the jungles, swamps and mountain peaks of their Country.... At a time when PNG is assuming a position of increasing prominence in the world and regional affairs, I hope this atlas of topographic maps will promote further understanding of the challenge of its environment and will contribute to the successful utilisation of its resources for the benefit of all its peoples and their neighbours."

== Major equipments ==
Major unit equipments included: Kern DKM3-A astronomic theodolites with Nardin chronometer and Favag chronograph for Laplace stations; Kern DKM3 geodetic theodolites; Wild T2 theodolites; Tellurometers MRA301 Electromagnetic Distance Measuring systems; various altimeter/barometer systems; various light signalling systems, Williamson F24 aerial camera; Kern levels; Wild B8 photogrammetric stereoplotters for map compilation from aerial photography - this task was often a respite from field survey work; programmable calculator Hewlett Packard 9100/9810A; high, very-high and ultra-high frequency radios . Equipments allocated by Directorate of Survey Army Headquarters as required: Transit Doppler satellite AN/PRR-14 Geodetic Receivers (Geoceivers), Wild RC10 Aerial Camera, Laser Terrain Profiler WREMAPS II. The unit was not equipped with survey vehicles.

== Unit operations ==
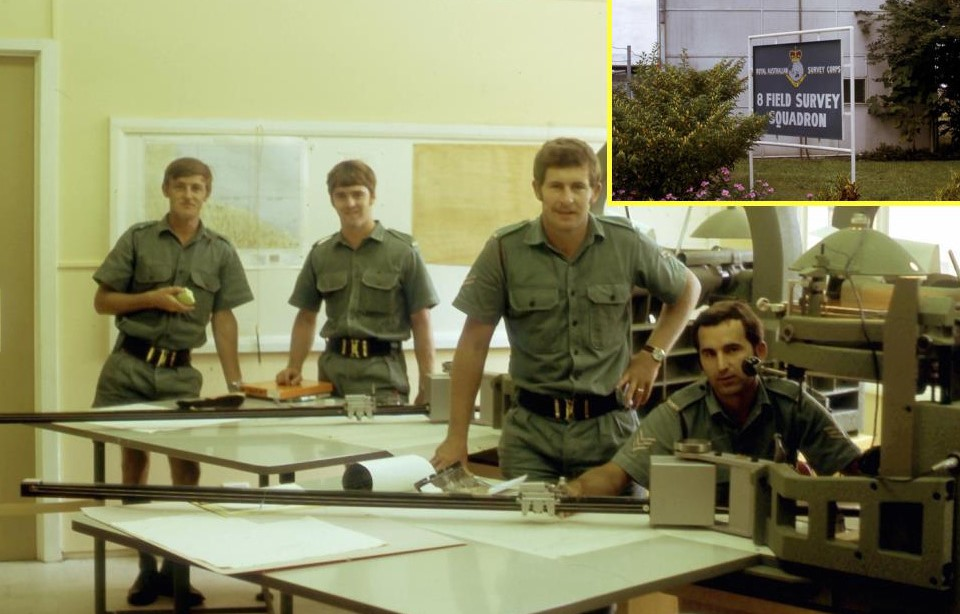
Topographic surveyors at Popondetta compiling scale 1:100,000 topographic maps from Skai Piksa air photography using Wild B8 photogrammetric stereo-plotters. A sergeant supervisor sitting at the B8 is checking the work of the corporal and sappers of the map plotting/compilation section.

General

- There are few countries in the world that present more challenging climate, weather, terrain, vegetation and seismic conditions which greatly impact on survey operations and those involved, than Papua New Guinea. Surveyors could be working and living on a beach, or in a mosquito-infested lowlands grass and tree swamp in the morning and on a freezing cold mountaintop over 10,000 feet high in the afternoon. A task on a high mountain planned for two days could turn into two weeks because of poor weather for survey observations or helicopter operations.
- Station numbering was the prefix AA (Australian Army) followed by three digits commencing with 500 (e.g. AA501) allocated to 8 Fd Svy Sqn. The exception was the New Britain geodetic traverse with station numbers AA102 - AA113 indicating first order stations. This convention started with the 1962 high order traverse, with AA001 being the first station number. Most stations were targeted with white or black plastic panels as crosses, black used on white sand beaches, for station identification on spot air photography for transfer to the mapping photography. Normal procedure for marking survey stations was: a Royal Australian Survey Corps three-and-a-half inch bronze plaque, stamped with the station number and set in concrete at ground level oriented such that reading the mark while facing north; three metal rod recovery marks set in concrete at ground level spread around the horizon about five metres from the station mark; one two-and-a-half inch capped galvanised steel pipe 'witness post', painted white, protruding about one metre from the ground placed about one metre north of the station mark.

1972

- Within weeks of 8 Fd Svy Sqn forming in Popondetta, operations commenced in January 1972 with vertical control by helicopter barometric heighting for scale 1:100,000 mapping of the Ramu, Goroka and Kwikela 1:250,000 map areas. Suitable existing survey points were marked (plastic panels) for spot photography by F24 aerial camera mounted in an Army Pilatus Porter. Horizontal control surveys by Wild T2 theodolite and Tellurometer MRA301 Electronic Distance Measurement (EDM) traverse and vertical control by Army Sioux helicopter barometric heighting were conducted in the Madang area.
- A 3rd Order level traverse of 115 kilometres from Oro Bay and Cape Killerton through Popondetta and over the Kumusi River to Kokoda was completed. Bench marks were established every three kilometres.

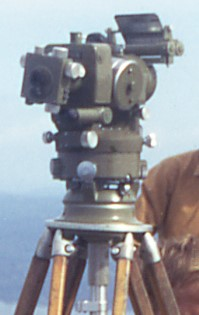
Theodolite Kern DKM3-A with an impersonal micrometer and Horrebow bubble for Almucantar longitude and latitude for 1st Order/Laplace astro-geodetic surveys – New Britain traverse 1973–74

1973

- A Madang-based survey fixed Bagabag Island by theodolite and EDM and vertical control by helicopter barometric heighting for scale 1:100,000 mapping of the Huon, Markham and Kainantu 1:250,000 map areas. Two survey stations on Bagabag Island, AA500 and AA501 were the first stations marked by the squadron.
- A major undertaking commenced with a 1st Order Laplace astro-geodetic (Kern DKM3 and DKM3-A theodolite and Tellurometer MRA301 EDM) traverse beginning at Rabaul (survey point The Mother atop an inactive volcano) on New Britain, west along the New Britain mountain spine through the islands in the Vitiaz Strait west of New Britain to connect with the high order coastal New Guinea traverse at Saidor. After delays mainly because of weather, the traverse was finally completed in late-1974. A RAAF Iroquois helicopter crashed and was destroyed by fire on the survey point HIRAN 15 (Nandan) about 55 kilometres west of Rabaul. All on board survived but the co-pilot was seriously injured. The helicopter crashed on top of another helicopter which crashed there when the US Airforce established HIRAN 15 survey point in 1962.

1974

- Surveys on Bougainville existed from Second World War, US Army Engineers after the war and TPNG Dept of Lands and Surveys. Suitable survey marks were found, cleared and panelled with white plastic crosses for the marks to be identified on spot photography flown with a Wild RC10 mapping camera mounted in a civil chartered Beechcraft Queen Air aircraft. The various survey networks were integrated into the Geodetic Survey of PNG/Australian Geodetic Datum 1966 by using original survey observations in a network adjustment (variation of coordinates by least squares adjustment computer program VARYCORD) compiled by 8 Fd Svy Sqn and computed by Directorate of Survey Army Headquarters in Canberra. A survey network by theodolite (Wild T2) and Tellurometer MRA301, and large scale mapping air photography was completed over Kieta, Arawa and the Panguna mine for large scale Urban OrthoPhoto Mapping (UOPM).
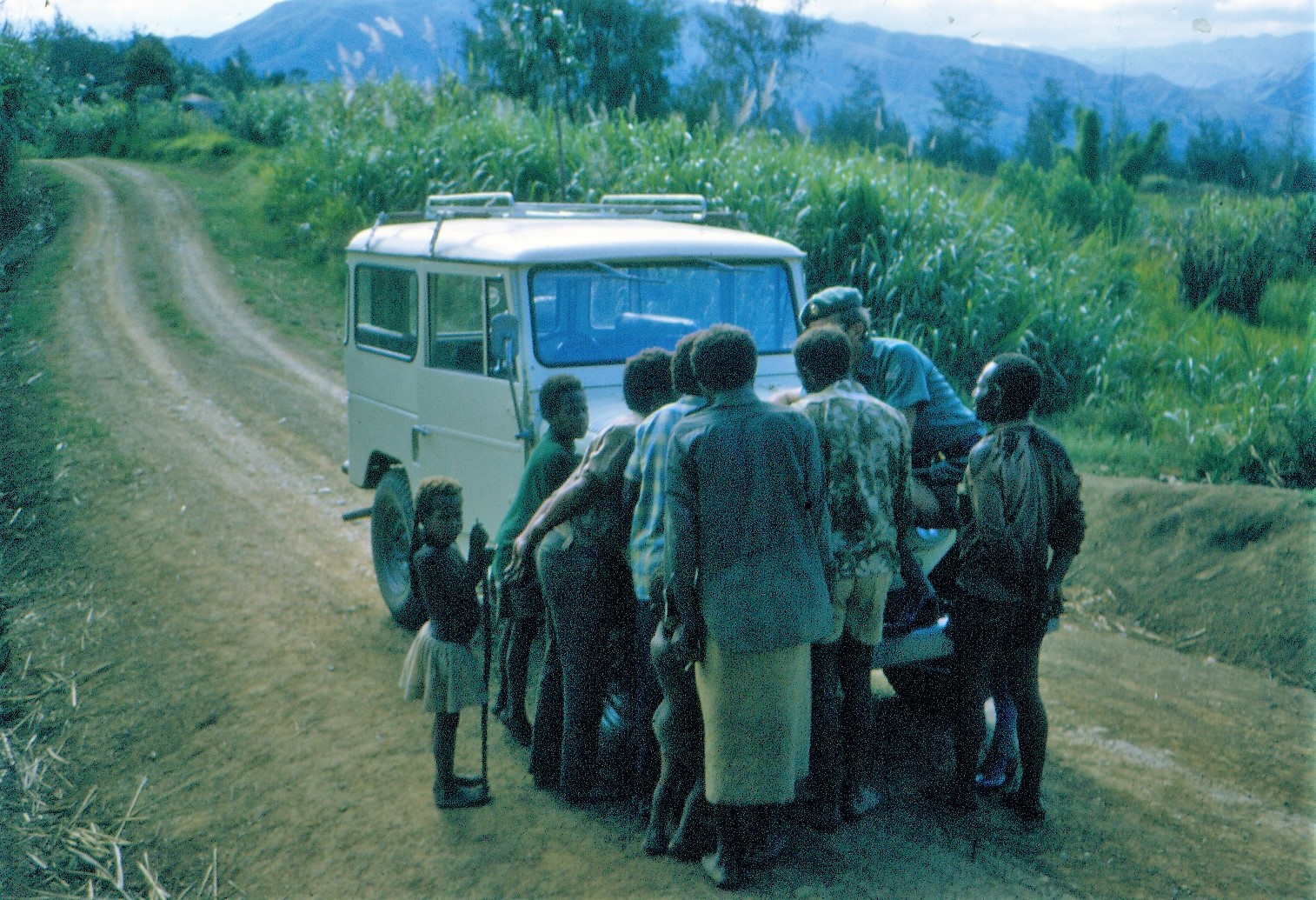
  A topographic surveyor asking locals about place names, road and track classifications while field checking the Popondetta 1:100,000 map in 1974
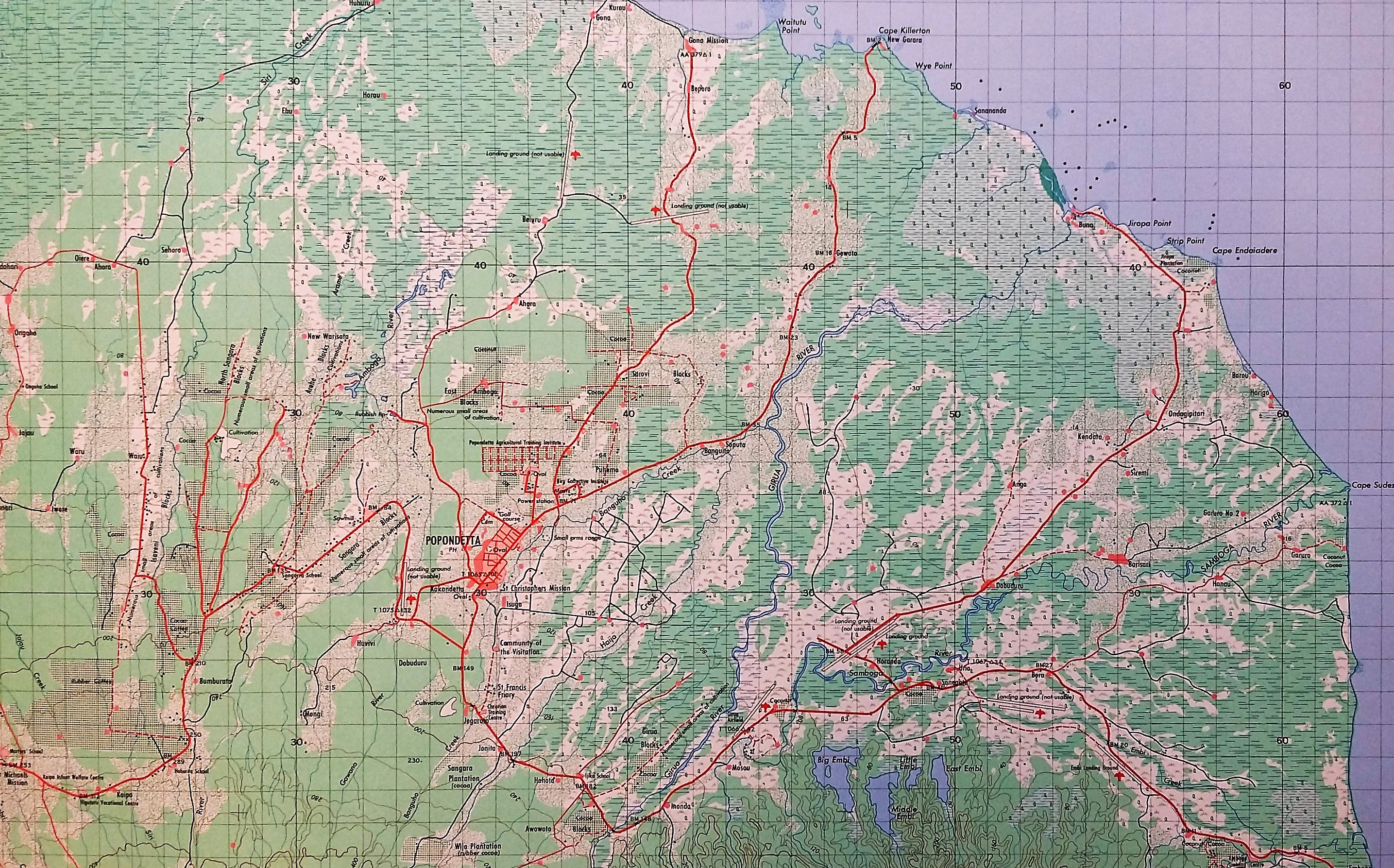
  Popondetta 8580 1:100,000 map published 1974 – part only – Gona, Sanananda and Buna are coastal villages at the top of the map
- May – the new Australian developed WREMAPS II Airborne Laser Terrain Profile Recorder (APR) was trialled
- Field completions of 1:100,000 preliminary map compilations commenced using RAAF Iroquois helicopters and vehicles for road classification and place names collection. Areas included the northern district centred around Popondetta and the Markham Valley/Ramu Valley/Huon Peninsula.
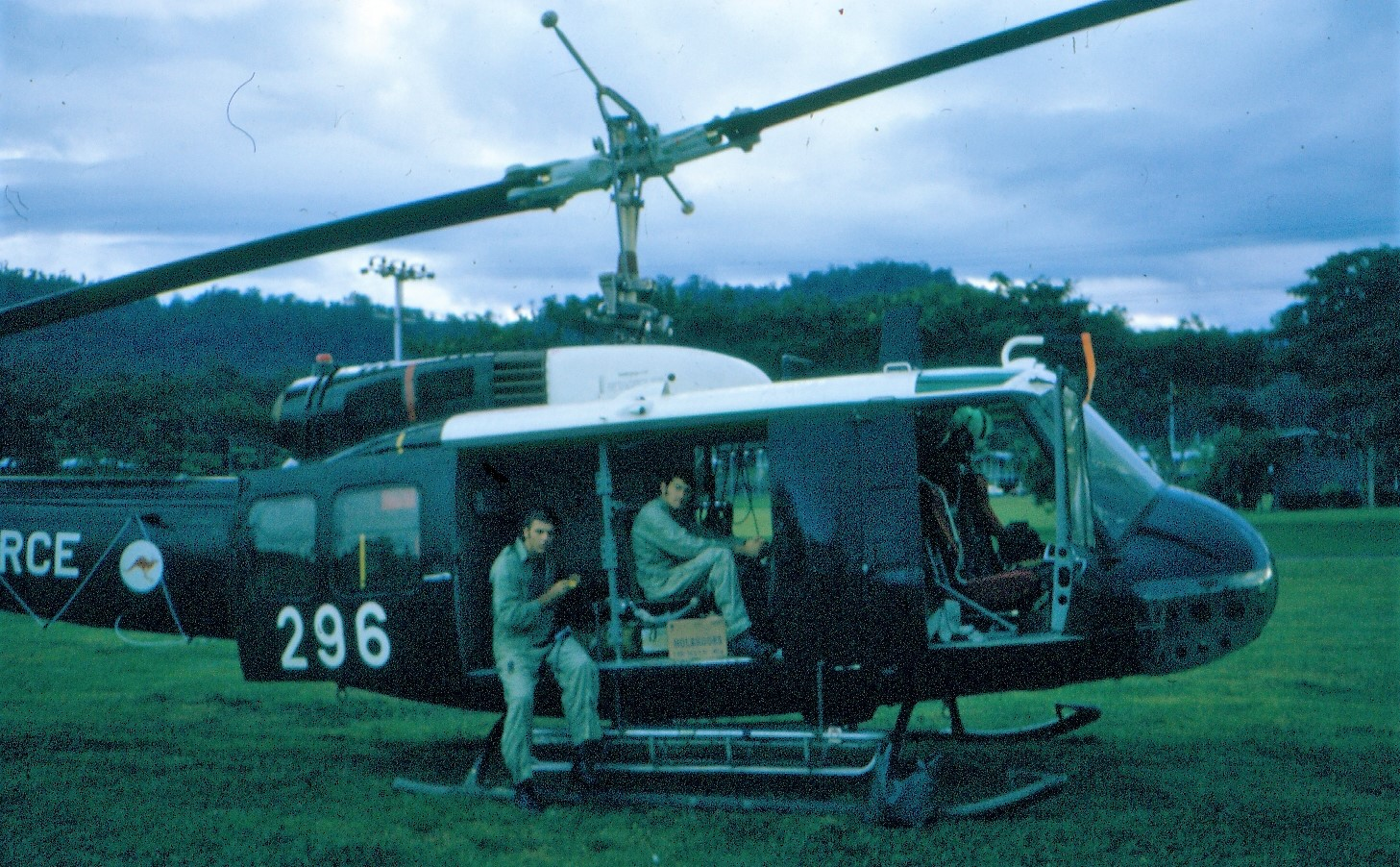
  RAAF Iroquois helicopter at Igam Barracks, Lae – topographic surveyors prepared for an early morning sortie to field check preliminary 1:100,000 maps.
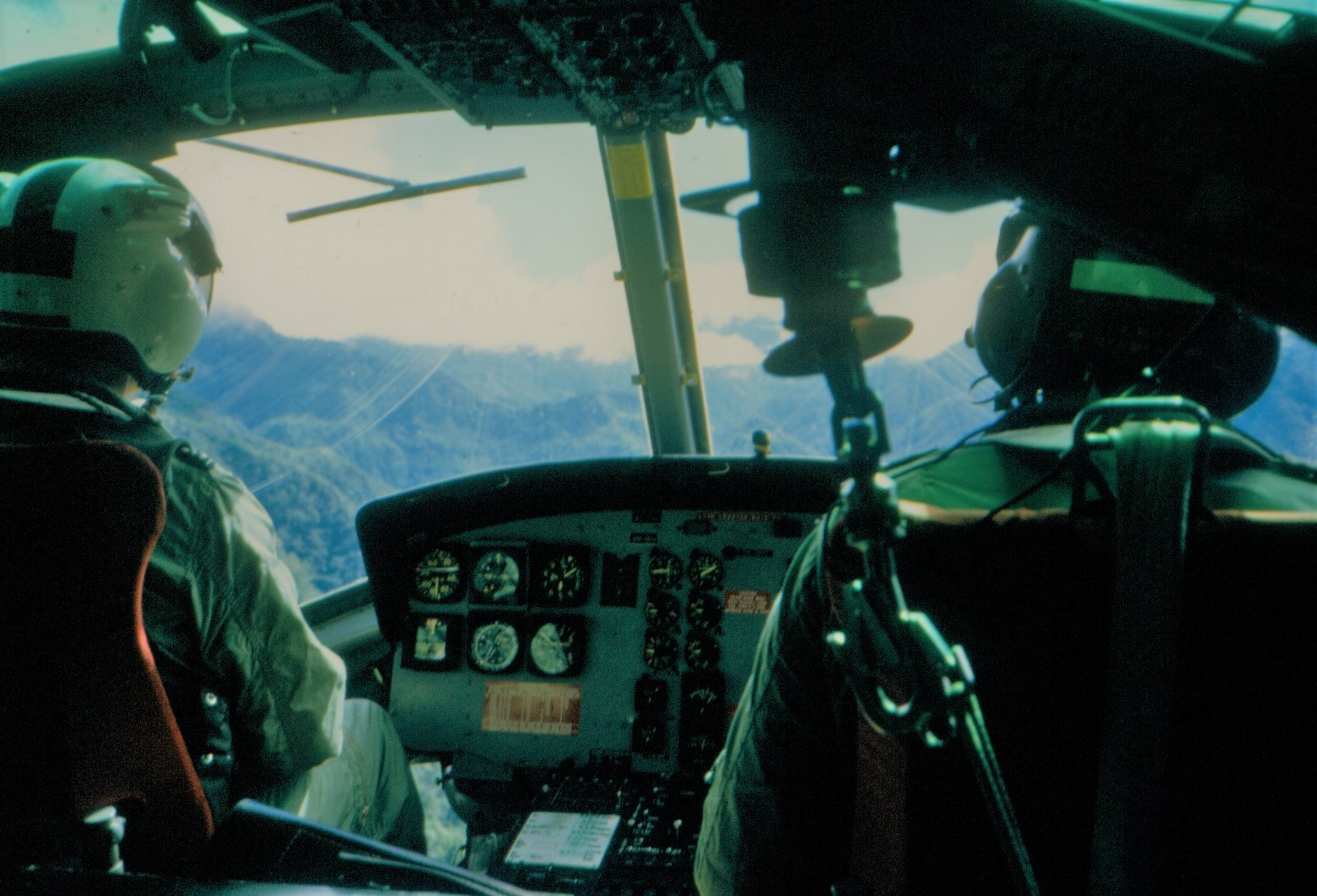
  RAAF Iroquois helicopter – field checking preliminary 1:100,000 maps for villages, tracks, vegetation classifications in the mountains of the Huon Peninsula. Two surveyors sat on the right side (cross bench and quarter compartment) to separately markup map corrections. The helicopter flew up the left of each valley and down the right to cover the terrain. The two pilots cautiously watched the morning cloud build up while advancing slowly up each valley as far as they could safely go with sufficient turn around space between the rising terrain and the lowering cloud base.
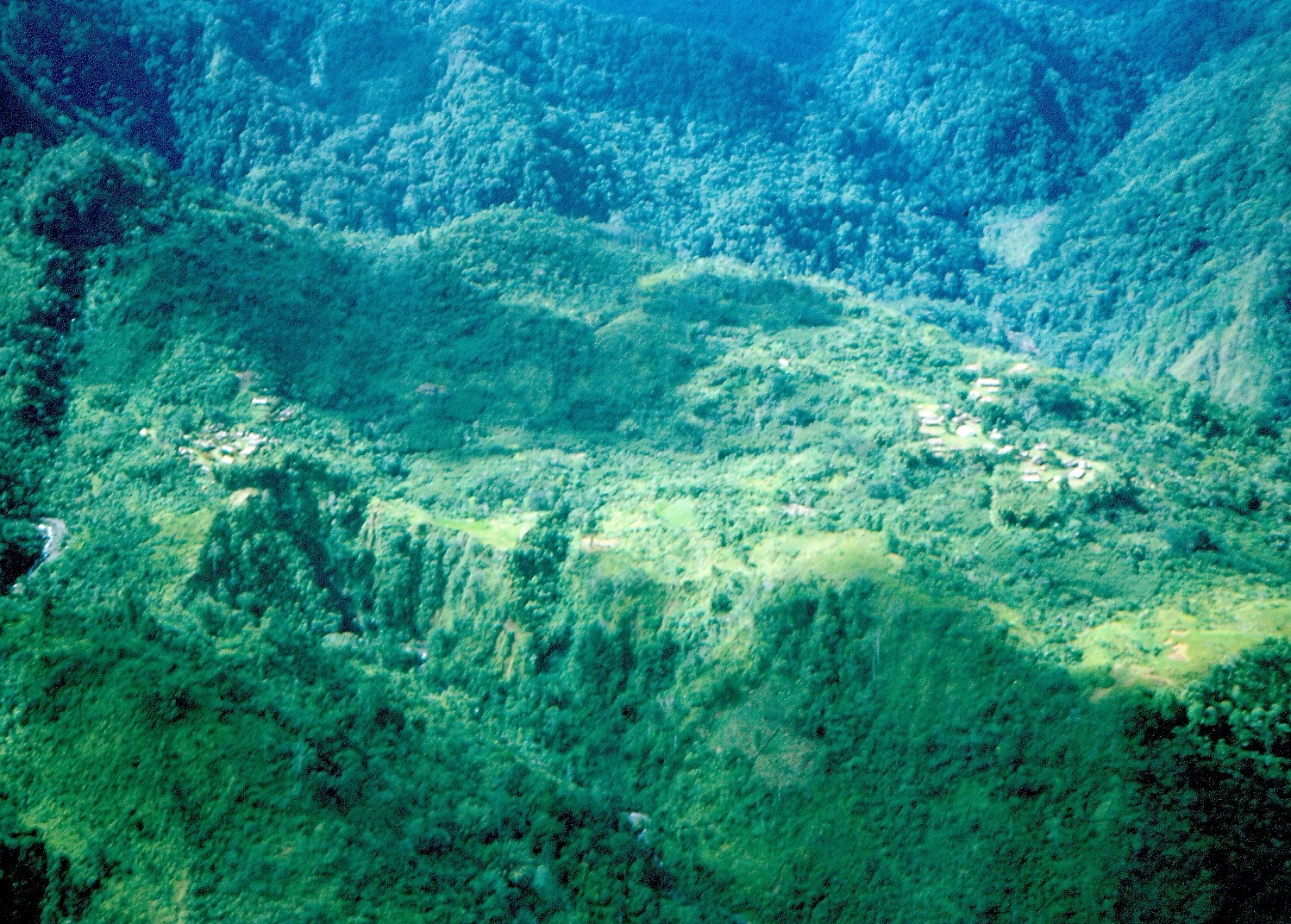
  Villages in the mountains of the Huon Peninsula
- The New Britain 1st Order Laplace astro-geodetic traverse was completed from Long Island in the middle of Vitiaz Strait connected to a high order RA Svy survey station, established 1962–64, near Saidor, New Guinea. The Long Island survey point on top of the highest point (1,280 metres or 4,200 feet) overlooked the huge volcanic crater Lake Wisdom. A volcano in the middle of the lake was active from time-to-time during the survey occupation, with ash and lava spouts sometimes above the lake surface and sometimes only surface bubbles. Volcanic activity was reported to Rabaul Vulcanology Observatory. Theodolite observations were interrupted by minor seismic/volcanic activity evident by the very sensitive theodolite level bubbles racing back-and-forth along their tubes.
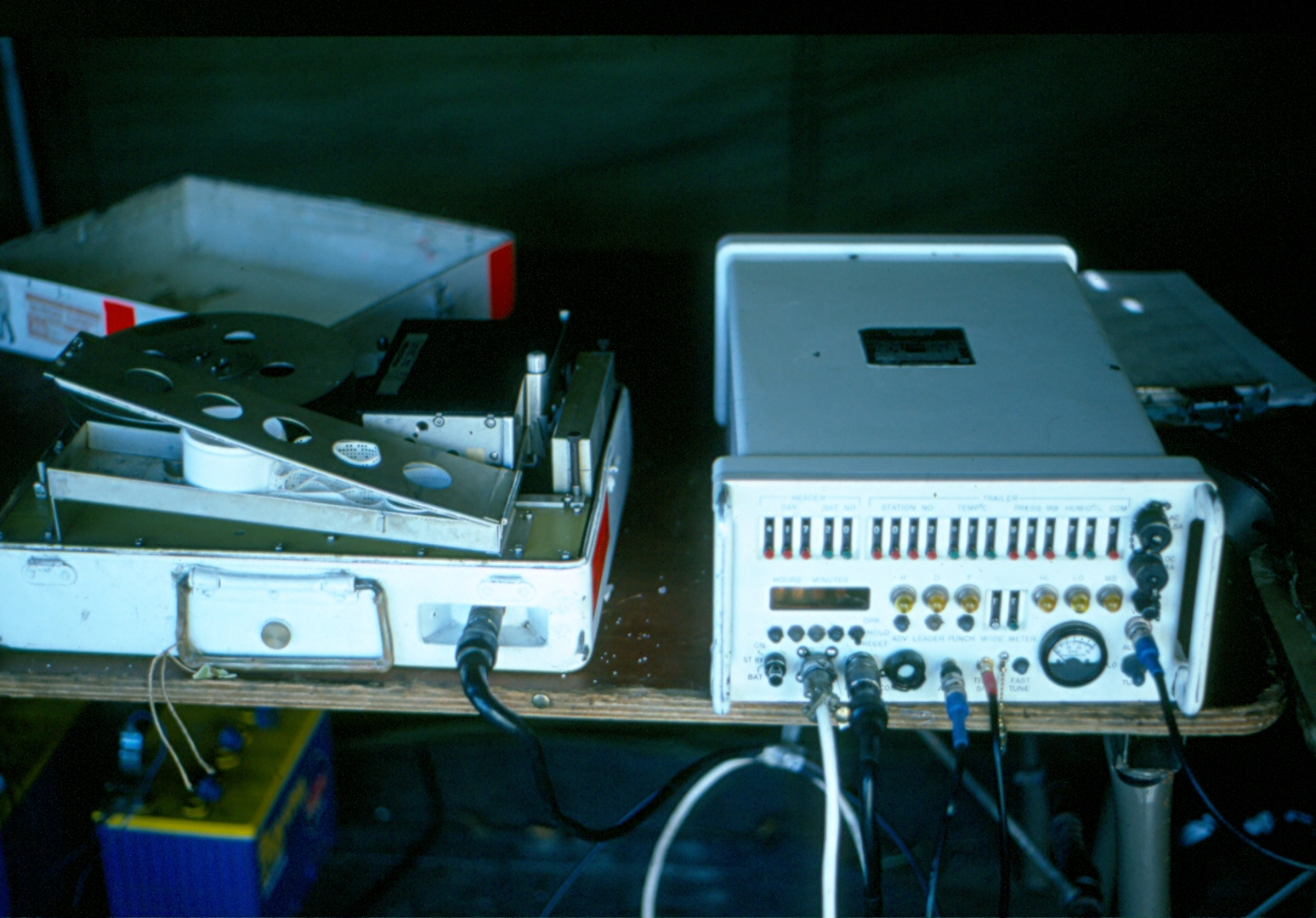
  TRANSIT Doppler satellite AN/PRR-14 geodetic receiver (Geoceiver) with punch papertape recorder

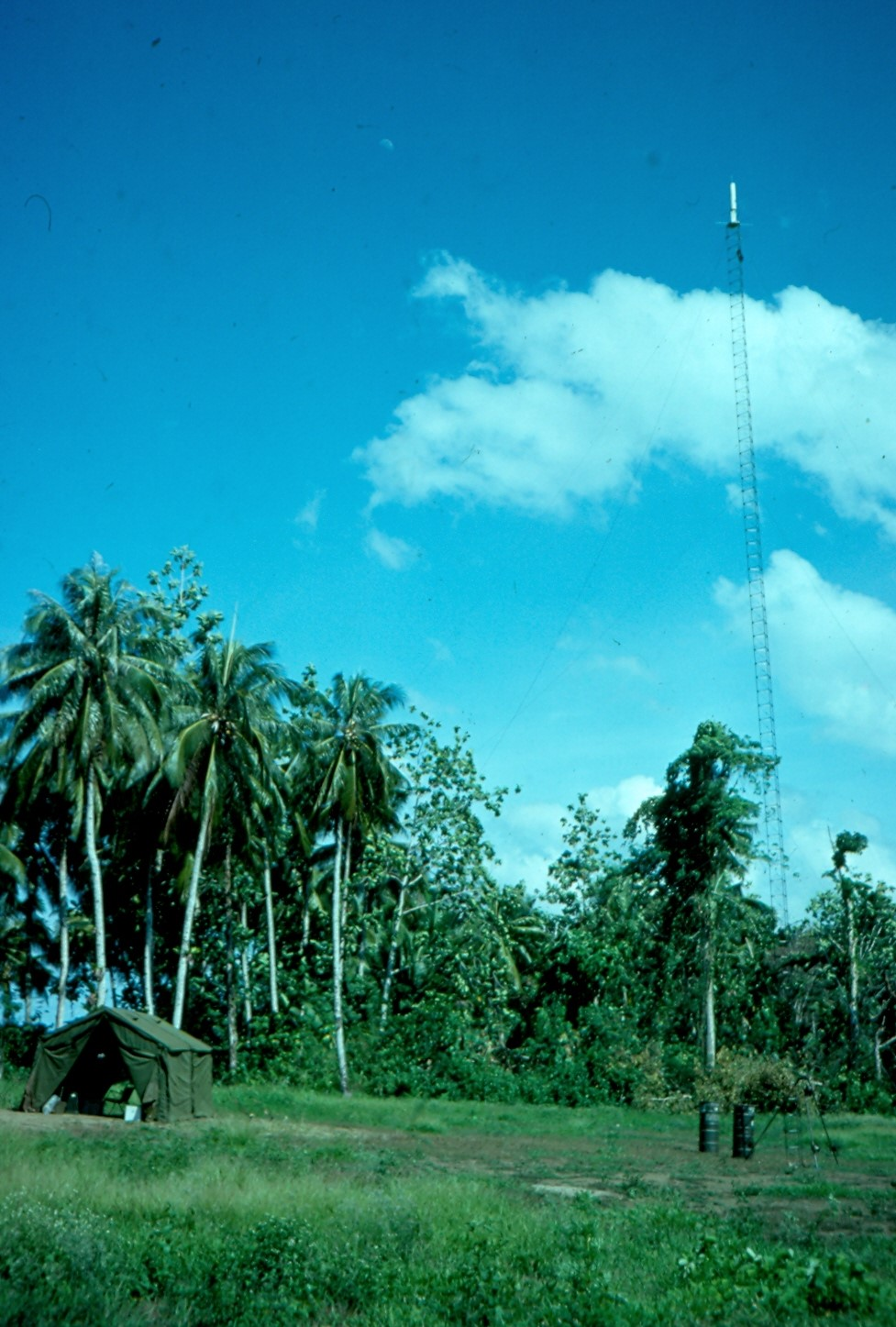
TRANSIT Doppler satellite AN/PRR-14 geodetic receiver (Geoceiver) antenna/preamplifier mounted atop a 70ft Canadian astromast tower

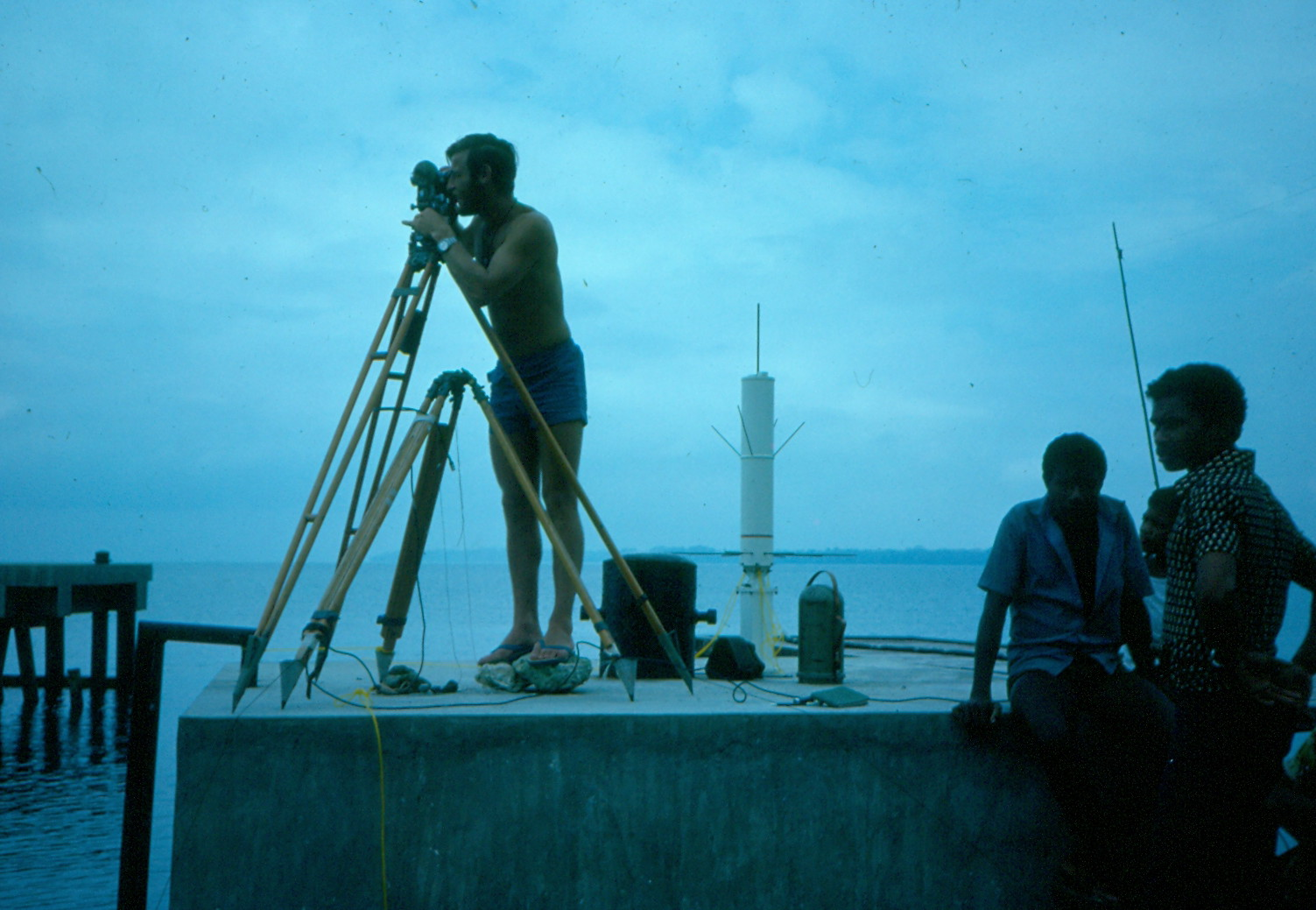
A topographic surveyor using a Wild T2 theodolite to observe the vertical angle to compute the height from the Geoceiver survey point to sea level. This allowed for an observation of the separation between the geoid (sea level) and the reference ellipsoid (geoceiver computed height) at that point. The Geoceiver antenna/preamplifier is off the tripod standing on the concrete in the background

- At the same time that the New Britain 1st order traverse was joined to the New Guinea high order traverse, the New Guinea survey point was also occupied by a TRANSIT Doppler satellite AN/PRR-14 geodetic receiver (Geoceiver) on loan from US Defense Mapping Agency and operated by 4 Fd Svy Sqn (Adelaide). This allowed for the connection of the astro-geodetic survey traverse to the global geocentric World Geodetic System which later became the reference frame for the Global Positioning System (GPS). Geoceiver was a huge technological and logistic leap, allowing geodetic quality surveys to be established with stations independent of each other, in any weather, any terrain, anywhere in the world, 24 hours a day. RA Svy was equipped with six Geoceivers in 1975 as a Corps asset and which were allocated as required to all field survey squadrons for surveys in Australia, Indonesia, Papua New Guinea and the South West Pacific. Geoceivers were highly productive and reliable in all operating conditions from sandy deserts to the variety of tropical environments. They were especially useful to survey offshore over the horizon islands where the only other options were astronomic fixes or more expensive Aerodist operations. Geoceiver satellite data was recorded on punch paper tape and processed (computer program named DOPPLR) with post-orbit precise satellite ephemerides provided by US Defense Mapping Agency, at Directorate of Survey Army Headquarters (Canberra) to produce three-dimensional geocentric coordinates accurate to about 1.5 metres from about 25 balanced (east-west, north going – south going, elevation) satellite passes. Geoceiver/Doppler station coordinates, reference the Naval Surface Weapons Centre 9Z-2 (NSWC9Z-2) geodetic system were then mathematically transformed to be consistent with the Geodetic Survey of PNG/Australian Geodetic Datum 1966.

1975

- Surveyors were detached to Royal Australian Navy/PNGDF maritime element Landing Craft Heavy (LCH) HMAS/PNGS Salamaua for an inshore route hydrographic survey for safe passage of LCH and Patrol Boats from Port Moresby south-east towards Milne Bay and assisted Staff Officer Survey Headquarters PNG Defence Force with miscellaneous tasks.
- Operation Beachcomber – a surveyor was attached to the HMAS/PNGS Salamaua based Beach Survey Team working in the D'Entrecasteaux Group of Islands (Goodenough, Ferguson, Normanby, Samaroa and Dobu Islands) north of Milne Bay.
- June – the squadron moved by LCH and RAAF C130 from its base at Popondetta to Wewak (Moem Barracks) after being in Popondetta for 3 1/2 years
- Field completion of scale 1:100,000 compiled maps in Bougainville, New Britain and western mainland.
- Operation Sandy Bush (June–December) – a geodetic and scale 1:100,000 mapping survey by Geoceiver in the 100 islands of the Louisiade Archipelago east of Milne Bay from Samarai in the west to Pocklington Reef in the east.
- survey control, air photography and photo annotation for UOPM

1976

- Operation Lahara – Geoceiver operations continued in the Trobriand and Woodlark Island groups
- Over five years, Geoceivers were used to fix 202 Doppler satellite stations across all parts of the country to geodetic and mapping quality standards.

1977

- Operation Nyalaun Kup Phase 1 (20 Feb – 8 May) – Geoceiver surveys, geodetic traversing, field completion and aerial photography. The Geoceiver operations in the islands east and north of the mainland completed the survey control for the 1:100,000 mapping program.
- Operation Nyalaun Kup Phase 2 (18 Jul – 2 Sep) – field completion of 1:100,000 maps in the highlands
- Operation Nyalaun Kup Phase 3 – (29 Sep – 27 Oct) – surveys to connect stations on New Britain established on Project Xylon 1954–55 to the New Britain high order traverse (1973–74), field completion of 1:100,000 maps of New Britain

1978

- Operation Ania Lolo Phases 1 – 8 across the country.
- field completion of various scale maps in Milne Bay Province, Western Highlands, New Britain, Manus Island, New Ireland, Bougainville and Solomon Islands (Ontong Java)
- pre-compilation photo annotation of scale 1:50,000 map areas along the Indonesian border
- Geoceiver and airfield levelling surveys for future APR operations throughout the Highlands.
- APR surveys of mainland north-west for 1:100,000 mapping
- theodolite and EDM traverses in Cape Gloucester area on New Britain
- mapping air photography of some Skai Piksa gap areas using a chartered Beechcraft Queenair and Army pilots

1979

- Operation Hano Puana Phase 1 – APR operations across the mainland for scale 1:50,000 mapping
- June – scale 1:100,000 map named HEGIGIO (south of Mendi on the Great Papuan Plateau) was the last map in the national coverage programme to be field completed
- survey and mapping records were prepared for handover to PNG National Mapping Bureau
- November – the last field survey task for the squadron based at Wewak was three Geoceiver stations in the Admiralty Islands

1980

- April – APR operations were completed ANZAC Day eve
- June – on completion of the scale 1:100,000 mapping programme the unit moved from Wewak to Port Moresby and downsized to provide advice and support to PNGDF and National Mapping Bureau and to act as liaison for future survey operations by Australian-based units.

1989 to 1994

- 2 Fd Svy Sqn (Sydney) and 4 Fd Svy Sqn (Adelaide) conducted Operation Kumul (Bird of Paradise) to establish survey control and air mapping photography in a one-degree (longitude) wide band down the Indonesia/PNG border for scale 1:50,000 topographic mapping. This operation, coordinated by 8 Fd Svy Sqn, was the first RA Svy use of Global Positioning System GPS Texas Instruments TI4100 military specification geodetic receivers outside Australia. GPS reduced the survey station occupation time to hours (point positioning) and minutes (relative positioning networks) compared with days and hours for the same type of Transit Geoceiver observations.
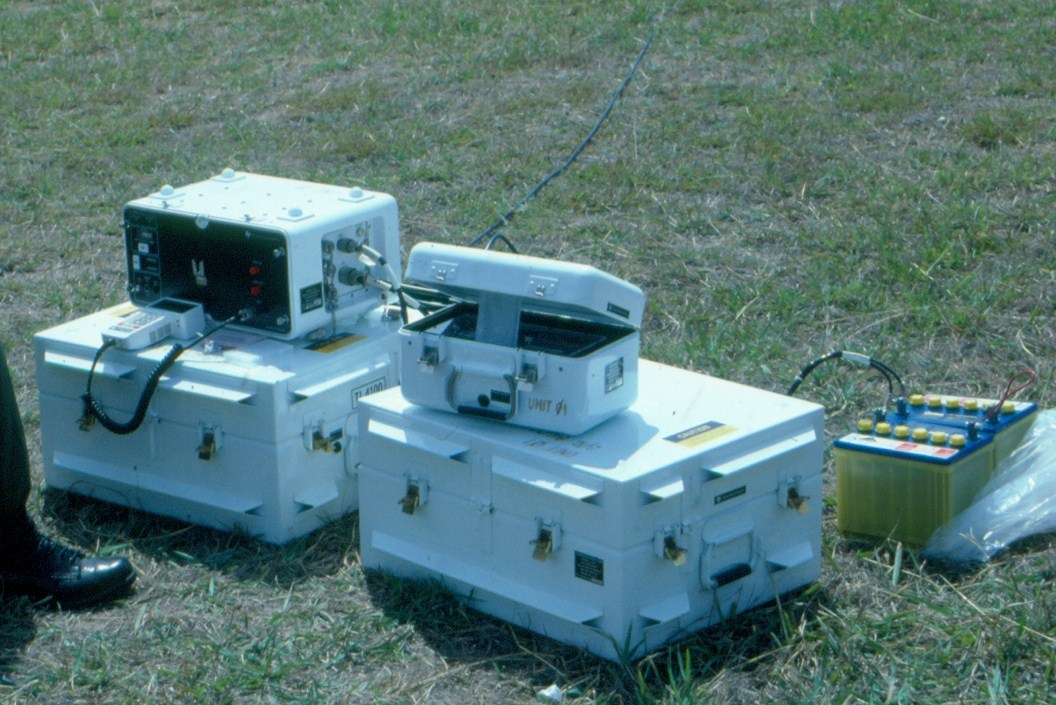
  Global Positioning System (GPS) TI4100 geodetic receiver, corded hand control unit and magnetic tape cassette recorder
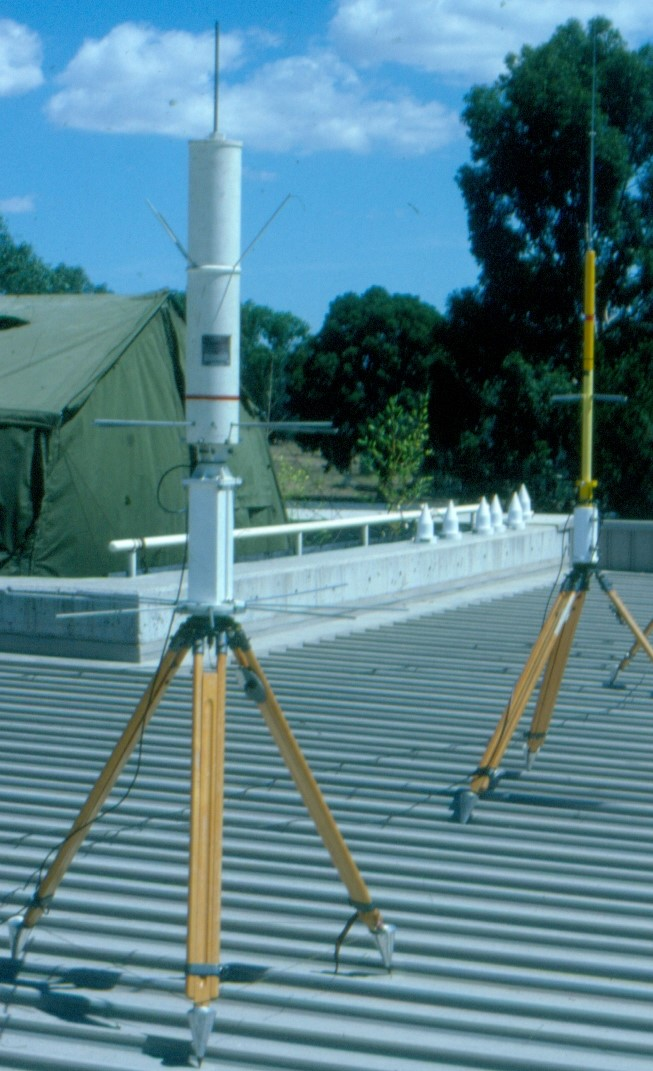
  GPS TI4100 geodetic receiver antennas (6) in the background on the concrete behind TRANSIT Doppler satellite AN/PRR-14 geodetic receiver (Geoceiver) antenna on tripod (left) and TRANSIT Doppler satellite MX1502 geodetic receiver (second generation) antenna on tripod (right)

All field survey operations would not have been possible without essential support of most other Army Corps (Engineers including Water Transport; Signals; Aviation – Porter, Nomad, Sioux; Chaplains, Medical, Dental, Transport, Ordnance, Electrical and Mechanical Engineers, Pay, Catering, Service), the Royal Australian Navy (Hydrographic Service, Landing Craft, Patrol Boats), the Royal Australian Air Force Hercules, Caribou, Iroquois), PNGDF forces and civil charter fixed wing and helicopters for aerial survey work and transport.

== See also ==
- Royal Australian Engineers
- Royal Australian Survey Corps
- 4th Field Survey Squadron
