= Mount Victory =

Mount Victory may refer to:

- Mount Victory, Ohio, United States, a village
- Mount Victory (Papua New Guinea), a volcano
