= Mount Victory (Papua New Guinea) =

Mountain in Papua New Guinea

Victory

Highest point
- Elevation: 1,891 m (6,204 ft)
- Prominence: 1,851 m (6,073 ft)
- Listing: Ribu

Geography
- Location: Papua New Guinea, New Guinea island

Geology
- Mountain type: Stratovolcano
- Last eruption: 1890 to 1935 ± 5 years

Mount Victory is an active volcano on the north east coast of Oro Province, Papua New Guinea with an approximate height of 1,884 metres (6,181 ft) to 1,891 metres (6,204 ft). It is bounded by the Ajova River.

The mountain is a major andesite volcano, with the magma known for its high levels of Nickel and Chromium. Captain John Moresby named the mountain after HMS Victory. The volcano was used as a beacon by ships, due to the red crater glow. It last erupted in 1935.

Hydrographers Range, Mount Lamington, and Mount Trafalgar are three other large Quaternary stratovolcanoes in south-eastern New Guinea.

== Morphology ==
Victory is dominantly Andesitic in origin, but also has traces of Basalt and Dacite, the lavas erupted have an unusually high level of Chromium and Nickel. The volcano is densely forested in all but the summit crater. On the sides of the volcano (near the summit) are four lava domes, two on the SW flank and two on the NE flank. The summit crater is breached to the SE and was probably created by a landslide. The summit now contains a small crater lake where weak thermal activity continues.

== Eruptions ==
A small eruption may have occurred in 1810 (give or take 10 years), but this event is uncertain. The only known eruption from Victory was a long-term eruption that lasted from the late 19th century to the mid 20th century.

=== 1890-1935 ± 5 years Eruption ===
An eruption from Victory began in around 1890. The eruption extruded a Lava Dome. The eruption produced deadly Pyroclastic flows that probably resulted in the deaths reported by local residents in the 1890s. The constant glow from Victory's long-term eruption (which could have ended as late as 1940) provided a beacon for passing ships. The stop date for the eruption is unknown but it ended between 1930 and 1940.

== Bibliography ==
- National Geospatial-Intelligence Agency (2011). Pub. 164 Sailing Directions (Enroute)—New Guinea. Springfield, Virginia: United States Government—National Geospatial-Intelligence Agency.
- "Victory". Global Volcanism Program. Smithsonian Institution.
- Volcanoes of The World, 3rd ed. 2011, Siebert, Simkin, Kimberly
