= Ajova River =

- Location of mouth

Location
- Country: Papua New Guinea

Physical characteristics
- Mouth
  - location: Collingwood Bay
  - coordinates: 9°19′S 149°13′E

The Ajova is a river of south-eastern Papua New Guinea. It flows into Collingwood Bay to the southeast of Mount Victory, Papua New Guinea.
