= Tony Taylor (GC) =

Australian volcanologist (1917–1972)

Tony Taylor GC
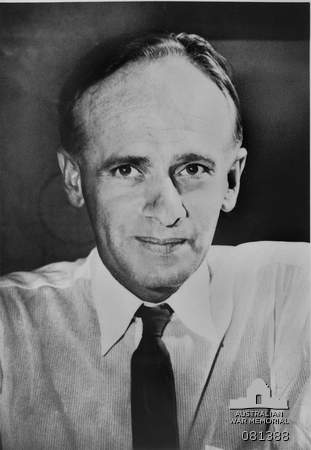
- Born: 30 October 1917; Moree, New South Wales, Australia
- Died: 17 August 1972 (aged 54); Manam, Papua New Guinea
- Resting place: St John the Baptist Church, Reid, Australia
- Other name: Tony
- Education: University of Sydney
- Awards: George Cross

George Anthony Morgan Taylor, GC (30 October 1917 – 19 August 1972) was an Australian volcanologist awarded the George Cross in 1952 for "conspicuous courage in the face of great danger" during the eruption of Mount Lamington in Papua from January to March 1951. Taylor was one of only five Australian civilians directly awarded the George Cross between its institution in 1941 and 1972 when it was replaced in the Australian honours system by the Cross of Valour.

== Early life and career ==
Taylor was born in Moree, New South Wales, the son of George Taylor, a businessman, and Eileen May Taylor (née Morgan). He was educated at Maitland High School and Sydney Boys High School. He began his career as a staff trainee analytical chemist at BHP. On 29 April 1942 he enlisted in 2/4 Ordnance Stores Company, Australian Imperial Force. His service number was NX95673. Taylor was based in North Queensland until May 1945 when his company was deployed to New Britain, initially to Jacquinot Bay and then, after the Japanese surrender, to Rabaul until October 1946. Taylor was demobbed on 8 January 1947 finishing his military service as a WO1. He then enrolled at the University of Sydney in March 1947 graduating with a BSc in 1950. After graduation Taylor joined the Bureau of Mineral Resources as a Geologist Grade I on 20 March 1950. His first posting was in April 1950 as a vulcanologist, based at Rabaul, overseeing all volcanoes in Papua New Guinea.

== George Cross ==
Mount Lamington, south-west of Popondetta is in the Oro Province, north of the Owen Stanley Range in eastern New Guinea. Five thousand feet high, it was not even recognised as a volcano until it began erupting on 18 January 1951. The main and catastrophic eruption took place on 21 January 1951. Over the next three months Taylor visited the volcano almost daily, sometimes staying overnight, collecting vital data to aid the rescue efforts.

The full citation was published on 22 April 1952 in a supplement to The London Gazette of 18 April 1952:

St. James's Palace, S.W.1, 22nd April, 1952.

The QUEEN has been graciously pleased, on the advice of Her Majesty's Australian Ministers, to make the undermentioned award of the GEORGE CROSS: —

George Anthony TAYLOR, Vulcanologist, Commonwealth Bureau of Mineral Resources, Territory of Papua and New Guinea.

Mount Lamington, in Papua, began to erupt on the night of 18th January, 1951. Three days later there was a violent eruption when a large part of the northern side of the mountain was blown away and steam and smoke poured from the gap for a considerable time afterwards. The area of extreme damage extended over a radius of about eight miles, while people near Higaturu, nine miles from the volcano, were killed by the blast or burned to death. This and subsequent eruptions caused the death of some 4,000 persons, and considerable damage. Dust and ash filled every stream and tank for some miles around, and there was urgent need of food, water and medical supplies. Rescue parties were hampered by suffocating pumice dust and sulphurous fumes, and hot ashes on the ground, and the advance post of relief workers at Popondetta was threatened with destruction by other eruptions during the several days following. Further tremors and explosions occurred during February. As late as March 5th a major eruption occurred which threw as far as two miles pieces of volcanic dome, 15 ft. by 12 ft. by 10 ft., and caused a flow of pumice and rocks for a distance of nine miles, the whole being so hot as to set fire to every tree in its path.

For a prolonged period Mr. Taylor showed conspicuous courage in the face of great danger. He arrived at Mount Lamington on the day following the main eruption and from that day onwards, over a period of several months, he visited the crater by aircraft almost daily, and on many other occasions, on foot. On some occasions he stayed at the foot of the volcano throughout the night. During the whole of this period the volcano was never entirely quiet. Several eruptions took place without any warning or any indication from the seismographical data which he had collected. Without regard for his personal safety he entered the danger area again and again, each time at great risk, both in order to ensure the safety of the rescue and working parties and in order to obtain scientific information relating to this type of volcano, about which little was known. His work saved many lives for as a result of his investigations in the danger zone he was able, when necessary, to warn rehabilitation parties and ensure that they were prevented from entering an area which he so fearlessly entered himself.

Taylor's investiture was performed by Donald Cleland, Acting Administrator of Papua and New Guinea, on 24 November 1952 in the Memorial Cemetery in Popondetta.

== Later life and career ==
After the eruption, Taylor returned to Canberra to study the seismographical data he had collected. He married Lindsay Grace Barrow (née Hudson) on 4 April 1956. They had two sons and a daughter. In 1957 he was awarded a Master of Science from the University of Sydney. In February 1961 Taylor was appointed Senior Resident Geologist in Port Moresby. Taylor died on the island of Manam in Papua New Guinea on 19 August 1972 at the age of 54. He was acting head of the Australian Geological Survey Division at the time of his death. His ashes were buried at St John the Baptist Church, Reid in Canberra. A plaque in his honour appears on the George Cross Memorial in George Cross Park in Canberra.
