= Hydrographers Range =

Forested volcano in Southeastern New Guinea

- Location within Papua New Guinea

Highest point
- Elevation: 1,938 m (6,358 ft)
- Prominence: 1,005 m (3,297 ft)
- Listing: Ribu
- Coordinates: 8°58′00.15″S 148°20′12.12″E

Geography
- Location: Oro Province, Papua New Guinea

Geology
- Mountain type: Stratovolcano
- Last eruption: Unknown

The Hydrographers Range is a forested mountain range in the Oro Province of southeastern Papua New Guinea. It extends from the eastern margin of Mount Lamington in the west to the Pacific Ocean coast in the east.

This coastal range represents a deeply dissected stratovolcano formed during the Quaternary period. It consists mainly of andesite and basaltic andesite but basalt and dacite are also present. Much of this volcanic massif formed during the Pleistocene epoch, but late-stage volcanism produced well-preserved cinder cones and explosion craters on the southern side of the range presumably during the Holocene epoch.

== See also ==
- List of volcanoes in Papua New Guinea
