= Mount Lamington =

Andesitic stratovolcano in Papua New Guinea

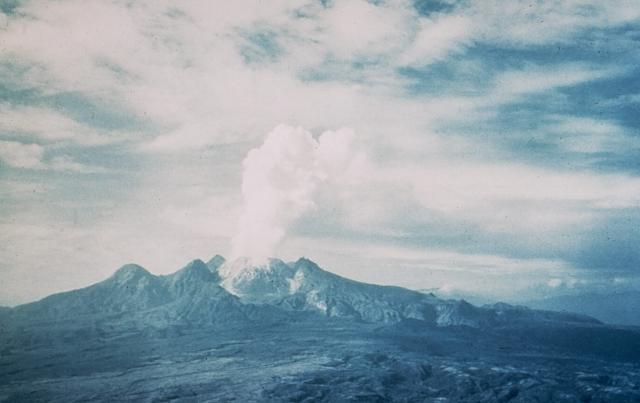
- After the devastating 1951 eruption

Highest point
- Elevation: 1,680 m (5,510 ft)
- Coordinates: 8°57′S 148°09′E

Geography
- Location within Papua New Guinea
- Location: Oro Province, Papua New Guinea

Geology
- Mountain type: Stratovolcano
- Last eruption: January 1956

Mount Lamington is an andesitic stratovolcano in the Oro Province of Papua New Guinea. The forested peak of the volcano had not been recognised as such until its devastating eruption in 1951 that caused about 3,000 deaths.

The volcano rises to 1680 meters above the coastal plain north of the Owen Stanley Range. A summit complex of lava domes and crater remnants rises above a low-angle base of volcaniclastic deposits that are dissected by radial valleys. A prominent broad "avalanche valley" extends northward from the breached crater.

The mountain was named after the 2nd Baron Lamington, who was Governor of Queensland from 1896 until 1901.

== 1951 eruption ==
Mount Lamington began to erupt on the night of January 18, 1951. Three days later there was a violent eruption when a large part of the northern side of the mountain was blown away and devastating pyroclastic flows poured from the gap for a considerable time afterwards.

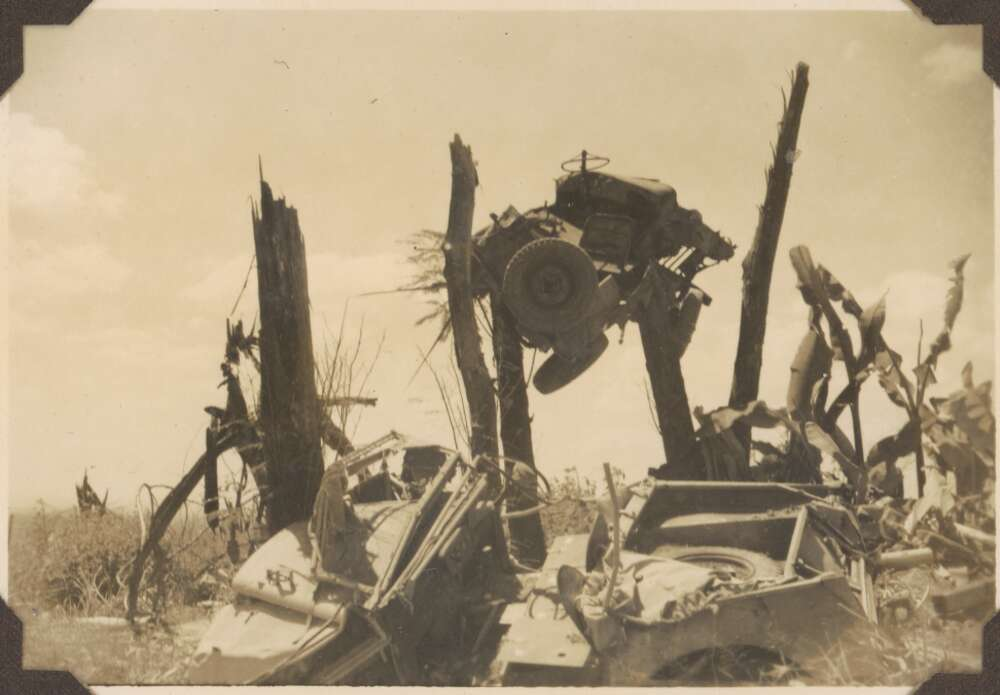
The 1951 eruption caused a Jeep to become stuck in a tree

The area of extreme damage extended over a radius of about 12 km, while people near Higaturu, 14 km from the volcano, were killed by the blast or burned to death. The pyroclastic flows and subsequent eruptions of dust and ash which filled streams and tanks, caused the death of some 3,000 people, and considerable damage. More than 5,000 people were made homeless. (Note: One figure for total number of deaths is 3,466 people, see Downs 1999, p. 24.)

Rescue parties which arrived on the scene were hampered by suffocating pumice dust and sulfurous fumes, and hot ashes on the ground. The advance post of relief workers at Popondetta was threatened with destruction by other eruptions during the several days following. Further tremors and explosions occurred during February. As late as 5 March a major eruption occurred which threw large pieces of the volcanic dome as far as three kilometers and caused a flow of pumice and rocks for a distance of 14 km, the whole time being so hot as to set fire to every tree in its path. The pyroclastic flow created from this eruption destroyed about 200 square kilometers of land.

Volcanologist and former Australian Army Warrant Officer, Tony Taylor, studied the volcano during the eruption cycle. His work is credited to saving lives by informing rescue parties when it was safe to go into the area. In 1952 he was awarded a George Cross for his efforts.

== See also ==
- List of volcanoes in Papua New Guinea
- List of volcanic eruptions by death toll

== Notes ==
Footnotes

Citations
