= Scribe (disambiguation) =

A scribe is a person who writes documents by hand.

Scribe may also refer to:

== Roles or occupations ==
- Medical scribe, person in charge of charting physician-patient encounters in real time
- Scribing (cartography), producing linework for maps
- Amanuensis or scribe, a person employed to write or type what another dictates

== Organizations ==
- Scribe (publisher), a publishing house in Australia founded in 1976
- Scribes (society), an American society of legal writers

== Crafts ==
- Scribing (joinery), a woodwork joining technique
- Wood scribe, a tool made for marking wood
- Scribing (graffiti), an artistic technique
- Scribing, used to control fractures in silicon wafer dicing, or the use of a glass cutter

== IT-related ==
- Scribe (markup language), a markup language and word processing system
- Scribe Software (disambiguation), several software products
- Scribe (log server), an open source server for aggregating log data
- Scribe Mail, an e-mail client for Microsoft Windows, Linux and Mac OS X
- Scribe, the Unicode rendering part of the Qt user interface library
- Scribes (software), a GNOME text editor
- The Apple Scribe printer, a peripheral for the Apple IIc computer

== Other ==
- Scribe Awards, an annual set of awards for writing tie-in books
- Scribe (film), a 2016 film by Thomas Kruithof
- Scribe (name), a surname or nickname

== See also ==
- Habrosyne scripta, a moth of North America
