= Footprint Tools =

British hand tool manufacturer

Footprint Tools is a hand tool manufacturer based in Sheffield, England. Most of their hand tools are still made in Sheffield at the Footprint factory.

== Company history ==
Footprint Tools can trace its manufacturing history as far back as the 1760s when Alfrid Ridge & Sons was established as a manufacturer of wood working tools. Ridge was bought by the current owning family in 1932.

The Footprint brand originates from 1875 when Thomas R Ellin, a member of a cutlery manufacturing family, started a tool manufacturing business under the brand “Footprint”. This subsequently became known as Thomas R Ellin (Footprint Works). This company was bought by the current owning family in 1948 and began to manufacture a range of tools under the Footprint, Domino, Climax, John Bull and Clinker brands.

During World War 2 the divisions of the business were engaged in manufacturing hand tools for British and Commonwealth forces. After the war Footprint continued to grow, manufacture and expand its range hand tools for the professional tradesman.

In 2004, Footprint cooperated with the University of Sheffield in a study of modern manufacturing techniques. In 2008 Footprint moved to a larger factory and invested in new forging equipment, but this process was interrupted by a global recession, and Footprint was unable to generate enough business to cover the cost of the upgrades. In early 2009 the company was forced to liquidate and lay off its staff in order to pay creditors. The Jewitt family retained the brand and intellectual property, and later that year revived the company under the name Footprint Sheffield, and began producing a smaller range of products at first.

With the same family of owner managers, now run by the fourth generation, in 2015 Footprint continues to manufacture most products in Sheffield, England and exports worldwide.

== Products ==
- Footprint Pipe Wrench: This tool was developed in 1880 to aid removing the old style grinding wheels that were commonly used in Sheffield, it was adopted by tradesmen as a result of its ability to move difficult nuts. The design is such that the tighter the handle is squeezed, the tighter the jaws clamp onto the work piece.

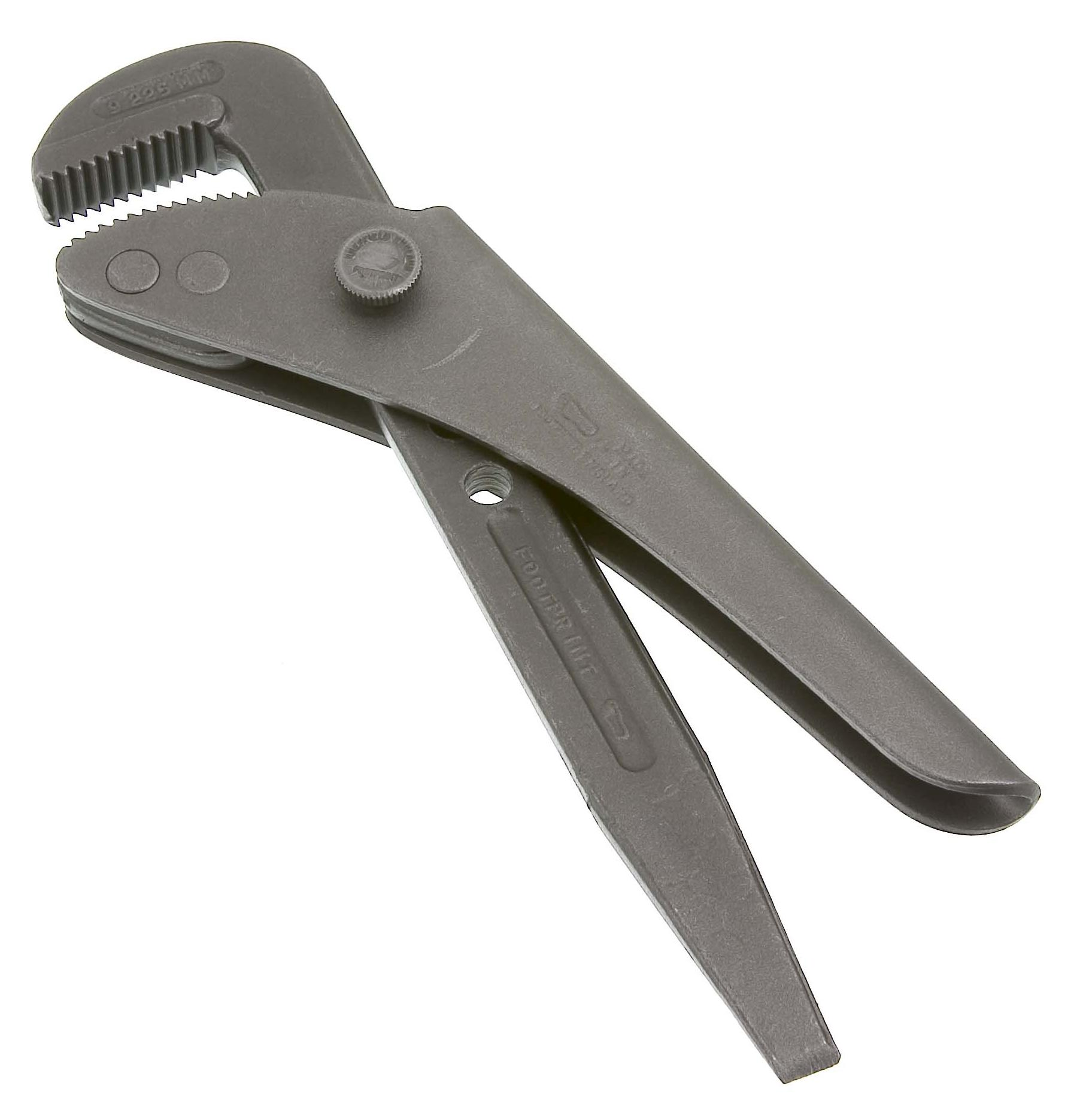
Footprint Pipe Wrench

- Builders Tools: Brick Bolsters (Brick Chisels), cold chisels, masons chisels and line pins.
- Decorators Tools: A range of stripping, filling, putty, hacking knife and palette knives.
- Woodworking Tools: A range of traditional wood working tools ranging from Marking and Mortice Gauges to hand saws.
