= Royal Australian Survey Corps =

- Active: 1 July 1915 – 1 July 1996
- Country: Australia
- Branch: Australian Army
- Type: Corps
- Role: Military survey
- Mottos: Videre Parare Est (Latin: "To See is to Prepare") (Note: Depicted is the crest and motto of the Royal Australian Survey Corps (RA Svy) as it existed at cessation in 1996. It replaced the original badge of the Australian Survey Corps approved in 1915. The crest was approved in 1949 with the King's crown and modified in 1953 with the Queen's crown. The motto was approved in 1965.)
- March: Wandering the Kings Highway (adopted 1965)
- Anniversaries: Corps birthday 1 July. Centenary 2015.
- Engagements: Royal Australian Survey Corps was not awarded battle honours.

Commanders
- Colonel-in-Chief: Diana, Princess of Wales

Insignia
- RA Svy flag

The Royal Australian Survey Corps (RA Svy) was a Corps of the Australian Army, formed on 1 July 1915 and disbanded on 1 July 1996. As one of the principal military survey units in Australia, the role of the Royal Australian Survey Corps was to provide the maps, aeronautical charts, hydrographical charts and geodetic and control survey data required for land combat operations.

Functional responsibilities associated with this role were: theatre wide geodetic survey for – artillery, naval gunfire and close air support – mapping and charting – navigation systems – command and control, communications, intelligence, reconnaissance and surveillance systems; map production and printing for new maps and charts, plans, overprints, battle maps, air photo mosaics and photomaps, rapid map and chart revision; map holding and map distribution; production, maintenance and distribution of digital topographic information and products. RA Svy survey and mapping information was, and still is, a key information source for geospatial intelligence.

The operational doctrine was that the combat force deployed into the area of operations with topographic products adequate for planning, force insertion and initial conduct of tactical operations, that new products and broad area updates of the topographic base would be provided by the support area and communication zone survey forces, and that the combat support survey force in the area of operations would update the topographic base, add tactical operational and intelligence information and provide the value-added products required by the combat force.

The Historical Collection of the Survey Corps is maintained by the Australian Army Museum of Military Engineering at Holsworthy Barracks, south-west Sydney, New South Wales. Survey Corps Associations of ex-members, family and friends are located in Adelaide, Bendigo, Brisbane, Canberra, Perth and Sydney. Many wartime maps produced by the Survey Corps are in the Australian War Memorial collection, while all of the maps produced by the Corps are also in the national collection at the National Library of Australia. All of these are available to the public and some are on-line.

== History ==
=== Origins ===
Australia's first surveyor, Lieutenant Augustus Alt, was an Army officer of the 8th (The King's) Regiment of Foot, which arrived in Australia with the First Fleet in January 1788. Eighteen years before him, Lieutenant James Cook, Royal Navy, used his knowledge and skills of topographic survey by plane-table for his surveys and charting of the east coast. This graphical method of topographic survey, first used before 1600, was the mainstay of the Australian Survey Corps for the first 20 years and used in the two world wars and occasionally much later. Cook had learned surveying in Canada from Royal Engineer Samuel Holland who then (1758) was the first Surveyor-General of British North America.

For 113 years after the arrival of the First Fleet, much of the mapping of Australia, mainly for colonial exploration, settlement and development, was supervised and conducted by naval and military officers. These officers included the well known explorers and surveyors: Captain Matthew Flinders, Royal Navy; Lieutenant William Dawes, (New South Wales); Lieutenant Philip Parker King, Royal Navy (mainly Tasmania, Western Australia and Northern Territory), Lieutenant John Oxley, Royal Navy, (New South Wales); Lieutenant Colonel Sir Thomas Mitchell (New South Wales, Victoria and Queensland); Captain Charles Sturt (New South Wales and South Australia); Lieutenant John Septimus Roe, Royal Navy (Western Australia), and Colonel William Light (South Australia).

After 100 years of settlement some topographic maps had been produced for both public and private use but only a few maps were of any real military utility. The colonial part-time Defence Forces prepared small-area training manoeuvre maps and some colonies had produced small systematic topographic surveys for defence of the main ports of trade and commerce in the 1880s and 1890s. That is not to say that the need for topographic mapping was not a government and public concern but there were only minor attempts to allocate appropriate public resources.

After Federation in 1901, the Defence Act 1903 made provision for military survey but nothing was immediately done to address the matter. Most recently a royal commission into the way the British Army had conducted itself in South Africa (Boer War) found that the troops had to fight without adequate topographic information. Indeed, accurate maps of the Boer republics did not exist. The Times' history of the Boer War 1899–1902 included: 'The chief deduction to be made in the matter is that no efforts during a war will compensate for the lack of a proper topographical survey made in peace time. Maps are a necessity to a modern army, and the expense of making them is very small compared with the cost of a campaign.'

In early 1907, Colonel William Bridges then Chief of Intelligence and the senior Australian military officer recommended to Defence Minister Sir Thomas Ewing, member for Richmond, New South Wales, that a Chief of the General Staff should be appointed in place of Chief of Intelligence and that a General Staff be established. The Minister, who was a licensed surveyor, was unimpressed by the advice preferring to continue for the time being with the arrangements of a Military Board. He was concerned that there were no plans for mobilisation, or local defence, noting that "there were few reliable maps, even of the most important localities".

These were the important national defence issues that Ewing recommended to Bridges for his immediate attention. The Department of Defence and the Government considered a number of options to address the important and urgent need for a military survey, finally deciding in late 1907 to raise the Australian Intelligence Corps (AIC) manned by part-time Citizen Military Force (CMF) officers who were trained in surveying or draughting and whose duties included the preparation of strategic and tactical maps and plans. In Victoria the military survey was the responsibility of Lieutenant-Colonel John Monash who was then the senior AIC militia officer in the 3rd Military District.

By 1909 the limitations of this arrangement were evident, and after advice from a senior British Army Royal Engineer Survey Officer, it was decided to embark on a systematic military survey conducted full-time by a Survey Section, Royal Australian Engineers (RAE) (Permanent Forces), allotted for duty under the supervision of the AIC. The Section was to be commanded by an Australian survey officer and staffed by Australian warrant officer draughtsmen and non-commissioned officers (NCO) topographers and four NCO topographers on an initial two-year loan from the British Army Royal Engineers.

The Royal Engineer topographers (Corporal Lynch, Lance-Corporals Barrett, Davies and Wilcox) arrived in Melbourne on 11 April 1910 and on 16 April 1910, draughtsman Warrant Officer John J Raisbeck was the first Australian appointed to the Survey Section and soon after he was joined by draughtsman Warrant Officer Class 1 George Constable. Raisbeck was a survey draughtsman from the Department of Mines, Bendigo, and a Second-Lieutenant in the CMF 9th Light Horse Regiment. He relinquished his commission to enlist in the Permanent Military Forces. He was granted the Honorary rank Second-Lieutenant and was retired with the rank Lieutenant-Colonel 33 years later at age 63 years having served in France in World War I and in World War II. Fitzgerald said that JJ Raisbeck was the 'pioneer of military mapping in Australia'.

The first officer appointed to the position Lieutenant Survey Section RAE (Permanent) was Lieutenant William Lawrence Whitham, a licensed surveyor from South Australia, having been highly recommended by the Surveyor-General South Australia. He assumed his appointment on 1 July 1910 at which time there were seven members of the Section. All men were professional surveyors and draftsman. CMF officers of the AIC in the Military District Headquarters supervised the work of the Section. In 1912 the Queensland, New South Wales, Victoria and South Australia State Governments each agreed to loan a Lands Department Survey Officer to the Survey Section RAE for two years to supervise the work of the Section in each State. Each Survey Officer was a militia officer in the AIC. The Section was divided into two sub-sections and employed in New South Wales, Victoria, South Australia and Western Australia producing scale one-mile-to-one-inch military maps ('one-mile' map) mainly of areas around cities and key infrastructure.

By mid-1913 the Section had completed topographic field sheets by plane-tabling for eight maps around Newcastle, Melbourne and Canberra. The initial method of using parish plans to position the topographic detail was soon found to be inadequate and a geodetic subsection was established in 1914 to provide surveys by geodetic triangulation as spatial frameworks for the field sheets produced by the topographers. The triangulation work started at Werribee south-west of Melbourne and proceeded west along the coast to Warrnambool. This work included the 1860 Geodetic Survey of Victoria where appropriate – much of which was produced by Royal Engineer officers. The AIC was disbanded in 1914 but the work of the Survey Section continued under the supervision and control of the Intelligence Section of the General Staff under the general direction of the Chief of the General Staff (CGS).

=== First World War ===
The outbreak of the First World War on 4 August 1914 did not, at first, seriously affect the work of the members of the Section as the highest priority and urgent work of the Permanent Forces was military survey for defence of the major cities and ports in Australia. Indeed, the Section gained an increase in personnel and equipment. At that stage it was understood that the British Army would provide the maps required for the Australian Imperial Force (AIF) war fighting. However, by 17 August the Draughting sub-Section of the Survey Section RAE in Melbourne had prepared a map of the north-east frontier of France for reproduction of 1,000 copies by photo-lithography by the Victorian Lands Department for issue to the Australian Imperial Force.

On 3 July 1915, Military Order 396 of 1915 promulgated that His Excellency the Governor-General has been pleased to approve of: 'A Corps to be called the Australian Survey Corps being raised as a unit of the Permanent Military Forces. All officers, warrant officers, non-commissioned officers and men now serving in the Survey Section of the Royal Australian Engineers being transferred to the Australian Survey Corps with their present ranks and seniority.' The effective date of the foundation of the Corps was 1 July 1915 – on that day there were two officers and seventeen warrant officers and NCOs of the Corps (at that stage there were no sappers in the Corps). The Australian Survey Corps was placed fourth in the Order of Precedence of Corps after the Royal Australian Engineers.

Raising the Australian Survey Corps had nothing to do with supporting the AIF then at Gallipoli, but provided for the key tasks of military survey of the high defence priority areas of Australia without direction or control of Intelligence Staff or the Royal Australian Engineers. The first Officer Commanding Australian Survey Corps was Honorary Captain Cecil Verdon Quinlan who had been appointed Lieutenant Survey Section RAE in March 1913 after Lieutenant Whitham resigned. Quinlan later gave credit to the creation of the Australian Survey Corps to the then General Staff Director of Military Operations – Major Brudenell White (later General Sir, Chief of the General Staff).

Survey Corps members started to enlist in the AIF in November 1915, with three Warrant Officer draughtsmen (Murray, Shiels and MacDonald) working with the Headquarters of the Egyptian Expeditionary Force by late 1916. Then in late 1917, General Headquarters in France/Belgium requested survey personnel for topographic surveys in that theatre and a volunteer Australian Survey Corps AIF draft of four officers and seven NCOs arrived in France early in 1918. Military Survey in Australia then came to a virtual standstill when the AIF members departed for the Middle East and the Western Front. 2nd Lieutenant Raisbeck, Sergeants Anderson and Clements and Corporal Watson served with the Australian Corps Topographic Section (not a unit of the Australian Survey Corps) in France/Belgium and Lieutenants Vance and Lynch, 2nd Lieutenant Davies, Sergeants Clews and Rossiter and Corporals Blaikie and Roberts served with General Headquarters Royal Engineer Survey Companies employed amongst other things on evaluating the suitability of the French triangulation networks for the purposes of military survey and mapping.

In late 1916, Warrant Officer Class 1 Hector E McMurtrie was enlisted into the Corps as a draughtsman for duty with the survey staff (not Australian Survey Corps) working on land title surveys for the military administration by the Australian Naval and Military Expeditionary Force in the New Guinea area. In 1919 he died from a service related illness, and is commemorated on the Australian War Memorial Roll of Honour. He was the first Australian Survey Corps member to die in war.

In early 1918 fourteen Corps members were serving with the AIF and eight were in Australia working on the military survey. One Survey Corps member (Warrant Officer Class 1 Alan Stewart Murray) and one Topographic Section Topographer Corporal Stafford were awarded the Distinguished Conduct Medal for mapping under enemy fire, Topographic Section Topographer Sergeant Finlason was recommended for a Military Medal but was awarded the French Croix De Guerre, Topographic Section Draughtsman Sergeant Wightman was awarded the Meritorious Service Medal. the Officer Commanding the 1st ANZAC Topographic Section in 1917 and the Australian Corps Topographic Section in 1918 Lieutenant Buchanan was awarded the Belgian Croix De Guerre and Topographic Section Lithographer Sergeant Dunstan was awarded the French Croix De Guerre. Warrant Officer Murray's citation for his work in Sinai and Palestine read "for conspicuous gallantry and dedication to duty. For a prolonged period this Warrant Officer was engaged on surveying the area between the lines repeatedly working under machine gun fire and sniping. In order not to attract attention he usually worked alone with his plane table and instruments. Owing to his energy and coolness he has mapped a piece of country accurately and his work has been most valuable." In March 1919 Warrant Officer Class 1 Norman Lyndhurst Shiels was mentioned in the despatches of the General Officer Commanding Egyptian Expeditionary Force, possibly for his work with the Royal Air Force in mapping from aerial photography.

=== Between the World Wars ===
When the AIF members returned to Australia in 1919 they were discharged and most were re-appointed to the Survey Section RAE (Permanent) or the Australian Survey Corps (Permanent). Military reorganisation after World War I, and the general reduction in military capability, saw the numbers reduced to fourteen all ranks. In 1920 the Corps was suspended and reverted, in title, to the Survey Section, RAE (Permanent). Mapping continued, mainly the 'one-mile' maps, albeit at a reduced rate consistent with the allocated resources, with priority given to areas around Brisbane, Sydney and Melbourne. By 1929 the Section had produced fifty-four 'one-mile' maps including five revised maps.

Technical developments provided for improved efficiencies. These included use of single photographs and strips of air photographs to supplement ground surveys by plane-table for topographic detail. The first military map produced with a significant component of aerial photography flown by the Royal Australian Air Force was the Albury 'one-mile' map published in 1933. Compilation of this map highlighted inconsistencies in State triangulation systems and once again demonstrated the need for a national geodetic survey which had been identified by colonial survey officers in the 1890s. The Survey Corps undertook this field and computation work linking QLD, NSW, VIC and SA with a 1st Order trigonometric network by 1939.

In 1932, the Army decided that the Order in Council which created the Corps in 1915 had never been broken and so the title of the military survey unit was once again the Australian Survey Corps (Permanent Forces) with the personnel establishment of fourteen all ranks as it had been for twelve years. Recruiting recommenced and in 1935 the Corps establishment was raised to twenty-five all ranks. Increments allowed for a Survey (Topographic) Section to be based in each of three states, New South Wales, Victoria and Queensland, a Survey (Geodetic) Section and the Survey (Draughting) Section in Melbourne. Then in 1938, with war clouds once again on the horizon, a three-year Long Range Mapping Programme was approved, with additional funding bringing the total to ninety-seven all ranks. These extra resources would provide for a total of about thirty-five new '1 mile' maps each year.

However, at the outbreak of the Second World War there were only fifty members in the Australian Survey Corps. Most of the men were professionally qualified, and the Corps was very knowledgeable of emerging technical developments which would improve efficiencies in map production. That there were no militia units of the Corps was due mainly to the fact that little progress in the mapping programme was achieved with part-time effort. The Corps was well equipped for the range of field survey and office mapping tasks with the exception of printing presses. Maps were printed by the Victorian State Government Printer. At this stage, just before the Second World War, the total coverage of military 'one-mile' maps was eighty-one maps or about 36,000 square miles (93,000 km^{2}) or only about 40% of the identified military mapping requirement at that stage.

Sections (all Permanent Forces) from the end of the First World War to pre-Second World War were:

- Survey Section, RAE
- No 1 Survey (Draughting) Section (Melbourne)
- No 1 Survey (Topographic) Section (Queensland, South Australia and Victoria)
- No 2 Survey (Topographic) Section (Victoria)
- No 3 Survey (Topographic) Section (New South Wales)
- No 4 Survey (Geodetic) Section (1st Order triangulation Southern Queensland – New South Wales – Victoria – South Australia)

=== Second World War ===
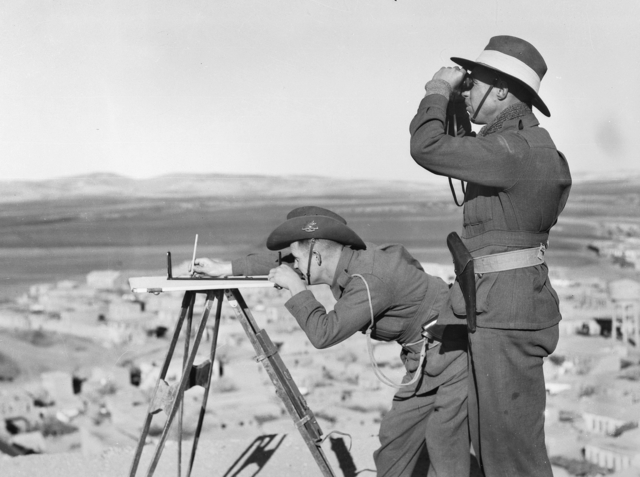
Soldiers from the Australian 2/1st Corps Field Survey Company, near the Turkish–Syrian border, December 1941, mapping the topography using a plane-table.

In July 1939 'Instructions for War – Survey' were issued, outlining the military survey organisation required to undertake an Emergency Mapping Programme to complete the outstanding Long Range Mapping Programme and be the nucleus for expansion to war establishment. The Emergency Mapping Programme was initially for strategic mapping at scale eight-miles-to-one-inch of inland Australia, four-miles-to-one-inch ('four-mile maps') covering a coastal strip 200 miles (300 km) inland from Townsville to Port Augusta and 100 miles (200 km) inland from Albany to Geraldton and key strategic areas in Tasmania and around Darwin, and 'one-mile' maps of populated places. Map production was from existing State Lands Department's information and conducted jointly between State Lands Departments and Survey Corps units. The programme expanded to include more of Australia, New Guinea, New Britain and New Ireland. Many maps were of a preliminary standard only, but provided general coverage critical at the time.

Initially, the Australian Survey Corps continued its mapping for the defence of Australia, proceeded with basic survey triangulation and provided training cadre for new field and training units. In January 1940, Field Survey Units RAE (Militia) were established in 1st Military District – Queensland, 2nd Military District – New South Wales and 3rd Military District – Victoria to accelerate the mapping effort. Deputy Assistant Directors – Survey were appointed to Military District Headquarters to advise on survey needs and to liaise with State agencies. In April 1940 the 2/1 Corps Field Survey Company RAE was raised as part of the 2nd Australian Imperial Force for service overseas and a Survey staff was appointed to the formation (Corps) headquarters. The Permanent Forces establishment of 97 remained the same to ensure consistency in training and work quality.

In September 1940 significant expansion of the Australian Survey Corps was approved by Cabinet with a view to speed up map production for the home forces. This included a Survey Directorate on Army Headquarters (AHQ) and higher formation headquarters, an AHQ Survey Company, an AHQ Cartographic Company, regional command field survey companies, a Survey Section 7th Military District (Darwin) and a Corps Survey Mobile Reproduction Section. Four militia Field Survey Companies RAE were established in the regional commands (1 Field Survey Coy RAE – Queensland, 2 Field Survey Coy RAE – New South Wales, 3 Field Survey Coy RAE – Victoria, 4 Field Survey Coy RAE – Western Australia) absorbing the Australian Survey Corps Sections and the Field Survey Units RAE (M) in the Commands. Units raised were RAE not Aust Svy Corps.

In early 1941, 2/1 Corps Field Survey Company RAE, sailed with the 2nd Australian Imperial Force, to provide survey and mapping to the Australian Corps in the Middle East theatre including Greece, Egypt, Cyrenaica and the border zones of Palestine, Syria, Trans-Jordan and Turkey. In response to the Japanese late-1941 and early-1942 offensives in South-East Asia and the Pacific, the 2/1 Corps Field Survey Company RAE returned to Australia in early 1942 with a large part of I Aust Corps. Over the next four years fifteen survey units with various roles relating to production of topographic maps provided survey and mapping support to military operations in the South West Pacific Area theatre of the war including Northern Territory, Papua, New Guinea, New Britain, New Ireland, Bougainville, Dutch New Guinea, Borneo, Philippines and the States of Australia, in particular northern Australia. Women of the Australian Women's Army Service served in Survey units and formation headquarter sections in Australia and in New Guinea. In June 1943 all topographic survey-related units were transferred from Royal Australian Engineers and concentrated in the Australian Survey Corps.

Acknowledgement of the value of survey support organic to the combat forces increased as the war progressed. Early doctrine was that survey support was at Army Corps level, but additional support was added at Army and Force levels, and by the end of the war survey sections of 5th Field Survey Company were assigned to both 7th Australian Infantry Division and 9th Australian Infantry Division for the large scale amphibious landings at Labuan and Balikpapan in Borneo. Later, the General Staff of Headquarters 1 Australian Corps said "...never in this war have Australian troops been so well provided with accurate maps, sketches and photo reproductions..."

More than 1440 new maps were made of the theatres of war (Middle East 28, Australian mainland 708, New Guinea area 364, Borneo 147, Mindanao Philippines 200), with more than 15 million copies printed. Many of the Second World War maps are available online from the National Library of Australia. The highly valued efforts of the survey units did not go unnoticed by senior commanders. On 13 November 1942, Lieutenant-General Edmund Herring, General Officer Commanding New Guinea Force, wrote to Director of Survey Advanced Land Headquarters thanking him for the noteworthy efficiency and splendid cooperation in having an urgently needed map of Buna, Papua, sent to 2/1st Army Topographic Survey Company RAE in Toowoomba QLD for printing, and then returned for issue to forward troops 48 hours later. On 1 June 1943, Lieutenant-General John Northcott, Chief of the General Staff, wrote a letter of appreciation of the work of the Survey units in New Guinea to the Director of Survey, Advanced Land Headquarters. On 19 October 1943, soon after the successful assaults on Lae and Finschhafen in New Guinea, General Douglas MacArthur, Commander-in-Chief, South West Pacific Area wrote a letter of high commendation of the performance of 2/1st Aust Army Topographic Survey Company, 3rd Aust Field Survey Company, 69th US Engineer Topographic Company and 8th Field Survey Section to General Thomas Blamey, Commander, Allied Land Forces, South West Pacific Area. At Morotai, the 1st Mobile Lithographic Section was given the privilege of preparing the Instrument of Surrender signed by Commander, Second Japanese Army and countersigned by General Blamey, Commander-in-Chief, Australian Military Forces.

The unit then printed thousands of copies of the surrender document for souvenirs. At the end of the war more than half of the Corps strength of 1,700 was on active service outside Australia. After the cessation of hostilities maps were prepared to assist in the recovery of Australian prisoners of war.

The achievements of the Corps during the Second World War were its greatest contributions to the nation; in recognition, in 1948 King George VI granted the title 'Royal' to the Australian Survey Corps.

Twenty-four members of the Australian Survey Corps, soldiers serving with or had served with Corps units, died during the war and are commemorated on the Australian War Memorial Roll of Honour. Five members of the Corps were formally recognised with awards and twenty-one members were mentioned-in-despatches. Awards – Colonel L Fitzgerald OBE, Captain HAJ Fryer MBE US Legion of Merit, Major HA Johnson MBE, Lieutenant-Colonel AF Kurrle MBE twice Mentioned in Despatches, Lieutenant-Colonel D Macdonald US Medal of Freedom Mentioned in Despatches. Others Mentioned in Despatches – Lieutenant NT Banks, Lieutenant FD Buckland, Captain TM Connolly, Sergeant HJ Curry, Captain FJ Cusack, Lieutenant LN Fletcher, Lance-Corporal BA Hagan, Lieutenant HM Hall, Warrant Officer Class 2 LG Holmwood, Lieutenant JD Lines, Captain LJ Lockwood, Lieutenant NG McNaught, Captain JE Middleton, Captain RE Playford, Lieutenant LB Sprenger, Captain CR Stoddart, Captain AJ Townsend, Warrant Officer Class 2 JE Turnbull, Lieutenant NLG Williams.

Australian Survey Corps units (from June 1943, earlier being RAE units) during the Second World War were:

- 2nd/1st Australian Army Topographical Survey Company, formerly 2nd/1st Corps Field Survey Company RAE – Middle East, Papua, New Guinea, Hollandia and Morotai
- No 6 Aust Army Topographical Survey Company, formerly No 2 Army Topographical Survey Company, absorbed Army/Land Headquarters Survey Company – Victoria, Northern Territory, Western Australia, Queensland, New Guinea, New Britain
- Land Headquarters Cartographic Company, formerly Army Headquarters Cartographic Company – Melbourne and Bendigo, Victoria
- No 2 Aust Field Survey Company – absorbed the 2 MD Field Survey Unit RAE(M) and Australian Survey Corps (P) No 3 Survey Sect – New South Wales, Queensland, Dutch New Guinea, New Guinea, New Britain, Bougainville
- No 3 Aust Field Survey Company – absorbed the 3 MD Field Survey Unit RAE(M) and Australian Survey Corps (P) No 1 Survey Sect – Victoria, Papua, New Guinea, Queensland
- No 4 Aust Field Survey Company – Western Australia
- No 5 Aust Field Survey Company, formerly 1 Aust Field Survey Company which absorbed the 1 MD Field Survey Unit RAE(M) – Queensland, Dutch New Guinea, Labuan and Balikpapan in Borneo
- No 7 Field Survey Section, formerly 7th Military District Survey Section, Northern Territory Force Field Survey Section and 1 Aust Field Survey Section – Northern Territory
- No 8 Aust Field Survey Section, formerly New Guinea Field Survey Section and No 2 Field Survey Section – Papua, New Guinea
- No 1 Mobile Lithographic Section, formerly 2 Army Survey Mobile Reproduction Section – Melbourne, Brisbane and Morotai
- No 11 Aust Field Survey Depot – Bendigo, Victoria
- No 12 Aust Field Survey Depot – Queensland and Morotai
- No 13 Aust Field Survey Depot – Sydney, New Guinea
- Field Survey Training Depot – Bacchus Marsh and Melbourne, Victoria

In addition there were Survey Directorates and Survey Staff on formation headquarters:

- General Headquarters South-West Pacific Area
- Advanced Land Headquarters – Melbourne, Brisbane, Hollandia and Morotai
- Headquarters First Australian Army – New Guinea
- Headquarters I Australian Corps – Middle East, Morotai
- Headquarters II Australian Corps – New Guinea
- Headquarters New Guinea Force
- Headquarters Northern Territory Force
- Headquarters of Queensland, Victoria, South Australia and Tasmania Lines of Communication areas
- Headquarters Kanga Force – New Guinea
- Headquarters Merauke Force – Dutch New Guinea

At the end of the Second World War, the Australian Survey Corps was the best organised, best manned and best equipped geodetic and topographic survey and mapping organisation in Australia. The Director of Survey expected that the organisation would play a major role in the future survey and mapping of Australia.

=== Post Second World War ===
==== Defence survey and mapping programmes (not including Defence international cooperation) ====
After the Second World War the Corps reverted to its peace time role of the military survey of Australia retaining a capability in the Permanent Force Interim Army in 1946, and the Australian Regular Army from 1947 with a desired Corps strength of 460 all ranks, although a strength of 400 was not reached until the early 1960s. By 1950 the all ranks numbers were down to 210 as civilian employment opportunities significantly improved. The Australian Survey Corps structure and size was both the force-in-being and the base for expansion in war. In the early post-war years the Corps continued mainly with the 'one-mile' map military survey programme and provided Defence assistance to nation building projects for water conservation and settlement in the Burdekin River basin in Queensland (194x–1949), investigative surveys for the Snowy River Diversion Scheme (1946–1949) in New South Wales and Victoria, surveys for water flows between the Murrumbidgee and Murray Rivers near Urana, New South Wales (1946), production of maps for the 1947 Australian Census and survey and mapping projects for the Woomera Rocket Range (1946–1953) in South Australia and Western Australia and the atomic test range at Maralinga in South Australia. Corps units were established in each of the regional military districts, except Tasmania and Northern Territory, and a survey school was established in Victoria.

In 1956 Australia adopted decimal/metric scales for mapping, largely for military interoperability with major allies and the global trend. After the 'one-mile' military maps were discontinued in 1959, and although Defence preferred 1:50,000 maps for tactical operations, it recognised the resources needed for such a programme over large regional areas of Australia and accepted the 1:100,000 map as a practical substitute with 1:50,000 maps over specific areas of interest and military training areas. Then in 1983 Defence endorsed a program for more than 2600 scale 1:50,000 maps in Defence priority areas in north and north-west Australia, its territories and the main land communication routes. By 1996 the Corps had completed more than 1900 of these maps by – field surveys using mainly US TRANSIT and GPS satellite positioning systems and aircraft mounted laser terrain profiling, new coverage aerial photography, aerotriangulation, compilation and cartographic completion on computer assisted mapping systems and produced both digital and printed topographic products.

Production of the military specification Joint Operation Graphics scale 1:250,000 is mentioned in the section "National Survey and Mapping Programmes" below.

In addition, there was a miscellany of surveys, maps and information produced by the Corps for units of each of the Armed Services. These included: production of air navigation charts for the Royal Australian Air Force covering Australia and a large area of its region totalling about eight per cent of the earth's surface; printing hydrographic charts for the Hydrographer Royal Australian Navy; joint and single service training area special surveys, maps and models including live fire requirements; vital asset protection maps; safeguarding maps for ammunition depots; digital terrain data and models for command and control, communications, intelligence, surveillance, reconnaissance, simulation, weapons and geographic information systems; photomaps using air and satellite photography.

Corps units, officers and soldiers were deployed on operations and conflicts of various types including:

- 1946 – staff posted to British Commonwealth Occupation Force, Japan
- 1955–1960 – Malayan Campaign, officers posted to Force Headquarters
- 1965 – 1st Topographical Survey Troop raised in Sydney NSW based at Randwick
- 1966–1971 Detachment 1st Topographical Survey Troop deployed with the 1st Australian Task Force in Vietnam, in 1967 re-designated A Section 1st Topographical Survey Troop
- 1975 – Cyclone Tracy – rapid response production of orthophotomaps and a senior Corps officer seconded as Staff Officer to the Army General commanding the emergency operations
- 1987 – Operation Morris Dance – rapid response mapping of Fiji
- 1988 – Operation Sailcloth – rapid response mapping of Vanuatu
- 1990–1991 – Operations Desert Shield and Desert Storm, Corps officers posted in United States and United Kingdom mapping agencies and units on operations
- 1992 – support to ADF elements of UN peacekeeping force in Western Sahara
- 1993 – support to ADF elements of UN peacekeeping force in Somalia
- 1993 – Corps soldiers posted to UN Transitional Authority in Cambodia
- 1995 – Corps officers posted to UN Protection Force Headquarters in Bosnia-Herzegovina

==== Defence international cooperation ====
Commencing in 1954, the Corps was again involved in surveys and mapping the New Guinea area, initially in cooperation with the United States Army Map Service for two years, and again as solely an Australian force from the early 1960s. The 1956 survey (Project Cutlass) of ship-to-shore triangulation included a 300-kilometre theodolite and chain traverse on New Ireland. From 1962 the Corps resumed geodetic surveys as part of the National Geodetic Survey, linking to the global US HIRAN survey and the high order Division of National Mapping traverse and triangulation through the PNG highlands. There was a continuous Survey Corps presence in Papua New Guinea (PNG) from 1971 to 1995, with 8th Field Survey Squadron raised in PNG and based at Popondetta, Wewak and Port Moresby for geodetic surveys, topographic surveys, map compilation, field completion of compiled maps, to support the Papua New Guinea Defence Force and to provide advice to PNG National Mapping Bureau. During this period the Corps completed the national/defence mapping programme of scale 1:100,000 topographic maps covering the entire country, the derived 1:250,000 Joint Operations Graphic – Ground and Air charts, large scale military city orthophotomaps and participated with the Royal Australian Navy in beach surveys of most of the coastline. In the 1970s up to 60% of the Corps' capability was engaged on PNG surveys and mapping. This mapping programme was based on high altitude (40,000 feet) air photography, acquired by No. 2 Squadron RAAF using Canberra bombers fitted with Army Wild RC-10 mapping cameras (Operation Skai Piksa 1973-75 and 1981), supported by Survey Corps surveyors and photogrammetrists to plan the photography requirements, to brief the aircrew and for quality control to ensure that the photography met the high technical standards for the subsequent mapping processes.

Under the Defence Cooperation Programme, the Corps completed many cooperative and collaborative projects with nations in Australia's area of strategic interest. These projects included ground surveys, definition of geodetic datums, air photography, assistance with definition of exclusive economic zones, mapping, provision of equipment and technology transfer and training of officers and technicians. Projects commenced in 1970 in Indonesia and expanded over 25 years to include Solomon Islands, Fiji, Tonga, Kiribati, Nauru, Tuvalu, Vanuatu and Western Samoa. Technical Advisers were posted to national survey and mapping organisations in Fiji, Indonesia, Malaysia, Papua New Guinea, Solomon Islands and Vanuatu.

All field survey operations outside of Australia, and indeed in Australia, would not have been possible without essential support of most other Army Corps (Engineers; Signals; Aviation – Cessna, Porter, Nomad, Sioux, Kiowa; Chaplains, Medical, Dental, Transport, Ordnance, Electrical and Mechanical Engineers, Pay, Catering, Service), the Royal Australian Navy (Hydrographic Service, Landing Craft, Patrol Boats) and at times the Royal New Zealand Navy (Hydrographic Service), the Royal Australian Air Force (Canberra, Hercules, Caribou, Iroquois) and civil charter fixed wing and helicopters for aerial survey work and transport.

Two members of the Australian Defence Force died on military survey operations in the 1970s in Papua New Guinea and Indonesia and are commemorated on the Australian War Memorial Roll of Honour.

Associations with other Armies commenced during the First World War and for more than 50 years after the Second World War the Corps participated in mapping, charting and geodesy projects for standardisation and interoperability with major allies including Canada, New Zealand, United Kingdom and United States. From the 1960s, the Corps participated in cooperative and collaborative geodetic satellite programs with the United States, firstly astro-triangulation of passive satellites Echo and Pageos being observed with Wild BC4 cameras at Thursday Island in Queensland, Narrabri in New South Wales, Perth in Western Australia and Cocos Island, a TRANET fixed station at Smithfield in South Australia in the global network observing US Navy Navigation Satellites (TRANSIT) from 1976 to 1993 and the first observations of US Global Positioning System (GPS) satellites in Australia, at Smithfield, during the development and early operational phases of the system from 1981 to 1994. The Corps managed bi-lateral Defence and Army map exchange arrangements with major allies and regional nations. Personnel exchange programs included Canada, United Kingdom and United States.

==== Participation in national survey and mapping programmes ====
In 1945 the National Mapping Council (NMC) of Australia, comprising Commonwealth and State authorities, was formed to coordinate survey and mapping activities after the Second World War. Despite the huge wartime mapping achievements of producing 224 'four-mile' strategic maps and 397 'one-mile' tactical maps, there was much to be done for a basic coverage of reliable topographic maps for national development and defence. In 1947 a National Mapping Section in the Department of Interior was established and together with the Survey Corps commenced work on the 1954 Cabinet approved general purpose (national development and defence) national topographic map programme, initially the 'four-mile' map then soon after scale 1:250,000 maps (series R502). Army agreed that when not required for solely military purposes, Survey Corps units would be available to work in the Defence priority areas in the Government approved national geodetic survey and topographic mapping programmes. This programme involved control surveys by astronomical fixes, theodolite and chain triangulation and traverse by theodolite and electro-magnetic distance measurement and all aspects of map compilation from aerial photography, final cartography and map printing. The Corps' geodetic surveys were integrated with other Commonwealth and State Government surveys to create the NMC sponsored Australian Geodetic Datum 1966 (AGD66) and the associated Australian Map Grid 1966 (AMG66) of Australia and Papua New Guinea and the Australian Height Datum 1971 (AHD71). By 1968 the Corps had completed its commitment of about half of the 540 series R502 maps and it then embarked on the Defence priority part of the 1965 Cabinet endorsed national programme of general purpose scale 1:100,000 topographic maps. This programme required densification of the national geodetic and height survey networks with mapping quality control surveys of Cape York, Gulf of Carpentaria, northern Northern Territory and north-west Western Australia using mainly airborne electromagnetic distance measurement systems (Aerodist). The Corps completed its commitment of 862 of these maps in 1982.

In areas of higher defence interest the Survey Corps replaced the series R502 1:250,000 maps with the military specification 1:250,000 Joint Operation Graphic (JOG) Ground and the companion Air version using materials from the 1:100,000 and Defence 1:50,000 mapping programmes and from other suitable sources.

==== Units and command staff post-Second World War ====
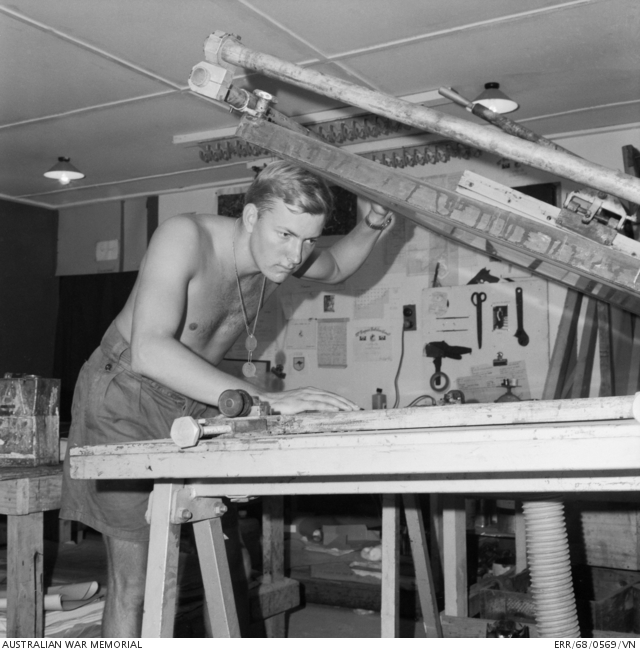
A member of the 1st Topographical Survey Unit screen printing maps of Phuoc Tuy Province at the 1st Australian Task Force's main base at Nui Dat in Vietnam during 1968

- Army Headquarters Directorate of Survey – Army
- Headquarters Field Force Command – Senior Staff Officer and Survey Section
- Army Survey Regiment based at Bendigo, Victoria, formerly AHQ Survey Regiment and Southern Command Field Survey Section, AHQ Cartographic Unit, LHQ Cartographic Company and AHQ Cartographic Company
- 1st Field Survey Squadron based at Gaythorne and Enoggera Barracks Brisbane, Qld, formerly Northern Command Field Survey Section and Northern Command Field Survey Unit – Queensland, Territory Papua and New Guinea
- 1st Topographic Survey Squadron, now part of the Royal Australian Engineers, based at Enoggera Barracks in Brisbane, formed from 1st Field Survey Squadron and 1st Division Survey Section
- 2nd Field Survey Squadron based at Sydney, formerly Eastern Command Field Survey Section and Eastern Command Field Survey Unit – New South Wales, Indonesia, Papua New Guinea, nations of South West Pacific
- 4th Field Survey Squadron including a Reserve component, based at Keswick Barracks, Adelaide, South Australia, formerly Central Command Field Survey Section and Central Command Field Survey Unit – South Australia, Northern Territory, Papua and New Guinea, Solomon Islands and Vanuatu
- 5th Field Survey Squadron including a Reserve component, based Perth, formerly Western Command Field Survey Section and Western Command Field Survey Unit – Western Australia, Indonesia
- New Guinea Field Survey Unit
- 8th Field Survey Squadron raised and disbanded in Papua New Guinea based at Popondetta, Wewak, Port Moresby
- 1st Topographical Survey Company (CMF) based in Sydney, NSW
- 2nd Topographical Survey Company (CMF) based in Melbourne, VIC (an element was absorbed by Army Survey Regiment when the company was disbanded)
- 1st Topographical Survey Troop – raised and based in Sydney NSW
- 1st Topographic Survey Troop – Detachment thereof later re designated A Sect in Vietnam, B Sect based in Sydney, NSW
- 9th Topographic Survey Troop (CMF) based in Sydney, NSW
- 7th Military Geographic Information Section based at Darwin, NT
- ANZUK Survey Map Depot, Singapore – formerly 16 Field Survey Depot formerly AHQ Field Survey Depot Detachment
- Army Map Depot, formerly AHQ Field Survey Depot and Army Field Survey Depot – Victoria
- School of Military Survey – initially based at Balcombe, Victoria and subsequently at Bonegilla, Victoria. In 1996 the School was integrated into the School of Military Engineering as the Geomatic Engineering Wing now at Holsworthy Barracks in Sydney
- Joint Intelligence Organisation Printing Section

==== Re-integration with the Royal Australian Engineers ====
The Survey Corps was subject to many Government and Defence reviews since the 1950s, with seven from the early 1980s. Review outcomes led to many reorganisations. In the late 1980s and early 1990s efficiency reviews led to an Army direction that the non-core strategic mapping functions of the Corps were to be tested as part of the Defence Commercial Support Program. Army decisions as part of that review were that: the combat support survey force (1st Topographical Survey Squadron) would be increased significantly; the non-core work, mainly systematic mapping of Australia would be performed by a new Army agency with civilian personnel; and, that the core strategic mapping would be retained by Army until it could be transferred to Defence Intelligence. This last component was achieved in 2000 when the Defence Imagery and Geospatial Organisation (now Australian Geospatial-Intelligence Organisation) was formed.

These changes meant that the majority of Survey Corps staff positions would be removed, and so in September 1995 the Chief of the General Staff (CGS) decided that the remaining combat support force and training force functions of the Corps would be once again integrated with the combat force and training force of the Royal Australian Engineers.

At the integration parade of the two Corps on 1 July 1996, 81 years after the formation of the Australian Survey Corps, the CGS said that "Since 1915 the Survey Corps has not just been a major contributor to the tactical success of the Australian Army in two World Wars and other conflicts, it has played an outstanding role in the building of this nation – the Commonwealth of Australia – and the building of other nations such as Papua New Guinea".

In 2014, the 1st Topographical Survey Squadron RAE came under the command of the 1st Intelligence Battalion. In 2018, the Army geospatial capability, less the field surveying capability, was transferred from RAE to the Australian Army Intelligence Corps. As a part of this process, the 1st Topographical Survey Squadron RAE was retitled 5 Company, 1st Intelligence Battalion while the Geomatic Engineering Wing was retitled the Geospatial Intelligence Wing and transferred from School of Military Engineering to Defence Force School of Intelligence.

== Corps Appointments and its people ==
Her Majesty Queen Elizabeth II approved the appointment, on 1 July 1988, of Her Royal Highness the Princess of Wales as Colonel-in-Chief of the Royal Australian Survey Corps.

Colonels Commandant (honorary appointment), Royal Australian Survey Corps:

- Brigadier D. Macdonald (Retd), AM (August 1967 – January 1973)
- Brigadier F.D. Buckland (Retd), OBE (January 1973 – January 1976)
- Colonel J.L. Stedman (Retd) (September 1978 – February 1983)
- Lieutenant-Colonel T.C. Sargent (Retd) (February 1983 – February 1989)
- Colonel N.R.J. Hillier (Retd) (February 1989 – January 1993)
- Colonel D.G. Swiney (Retd), MBE (January 1993 – January 1996)

Officers Commanding, Survey Section RAE:

- Lieutenant W.L. Whitham (July 1910 – September 1912)
- Captain C.V. Quinlan (March 1913 – June 1915)

Officers Commanding, Australian Survey Corps:

- Captain C.V. Quinlan (July 1915 – January 1916)
- Captain J. Lynch (January 1916 – May 1934)
- Major T.A. Vance (March 1936 – December 1940)

Directors of Military Survey (or Survey – Army):

- Lieutenant-Colonel T.A. Vance (January 1941 – June 1942)
- Colonel L. Fitzgerald, OBE (June 1942 – January 1960)
- Colonel D. Macdonald, (January 1960 – March 1967)
- Colonel F.D. Buckland, OBE (March 1967 – August 1972)
- Colonel J.K. Nolan (August 1972 – June 1975)
- Colonel J.L. Stedman (July 1975 – February 1978)
- Colonel N.R.J. Hillier (March 1978 – July 1983)
- Colonel A.W. Laing (July 1983 – November 1988)
- Colonel D.G. Swiney, MBE (November 1988 – January 1991)
- Colonel S.W. Lemon (January 1991 – June 1996)

The high reputation and esteem in which the Corps was held within the Australian Defence Force, the surveying and mapping profession and amongst Australia's military allies and friends was based on its achievements largely possible only by the quality of its people. This was greatly enhanced by the camaraderie and espirit-de-corps of the members of the Corps, knowing the high military value and high quality of the work that they produced. After World War II eight Corps officers were later appointed Surveyors-General or Directors of Survey/Mapping/Lands in the States or Commonwealth organisations. Many personnel went on to leadership positions in professional institutions. The first five members of the Institution of Surveyors, Australia, to be recognised for outstanding service to the profession and awarded a special medial, with a gold medal for exceptional service, had all been Second World War officers of the Survey Corps (Brigadier L Fitzgerald OBE, Lieutenant-Colonel JG Gillespie MBE (gold medal), Lieutenant-Colonel HA Johnson MBE, Captain SE Reilly MBE, Brigadier D Macdonald AM.

From the 1960s, most Corps officers were tertiary educated with many at the post-graduate level in either mapping or computer disciplines and military command and staff training. This was the key to understanding the potential, application and implementation of emerging technologies and techniques across all aspects of Corps capability. Corps soldier training was both broad within a trade, across Corps trades and specific to specialised equipment with military training for various levels of leadership. Officers and soldiers posted outside Corps positions were highly regarded. Until the 1970s the Corps sponsored and trained soldiers in trades other than the mapping related trades essential to its operations. These included drivers, storemen and clerks. After some rationalisation the Corps retained career and training responsibility for all mapping related trades, and also photographers (non-public relations), illustrators and projectionists who were posted mainly to training institutions and headquarters.

More than 6,300 people served in the Survey Section (RAE), Australian Survey Corps units and Royal Australian Survey Corps units from 1910 to 1996, including more than 580 women from 1942 to 1996. A Survey Corps Nominal Roll 1915–1996 may be accessed from the front page of the website of the Royal Australian Survey Corps Association linked on External Links below.

The Corps participated in the national service scheme in the 1950s, training and maintaining two Citizen Military Force topographic survey companies in Sydney and Melbourne from 1951 to 1957, mainly for national servicemen to complete their obligations. National servicemen then served with the Survey Corps in Vietnam from 1966 to 1971.

The Army Audio Visual Unit was the only Corps unit not to have a mapping related role.

== Equipment, Technology and Techniques ==
Significant examples:

- 1910–1915: established the standard for the Australian Military Map Series, based on United Kingdom Ordnance Survey maps; mainly 'one-mile-to-one-inch' maps (known as the 'one-mile' map) produced from field survey sheets 'one-mile-to-two-inches' using plane-tabling and parish plans for position, scale and orientation, final map compilation by ink fair drawing at 'one-mile-to-two-inches' using a polyconic projection and lithographic draughting for colour separation (seven colours) and photographic reduction to 'one-mile-to-one-inch' for printing by the Victorian Government Printer. The Military Survey sheet numbering system was that of the International Map Congress of 1912. Standard map sheet extent was 30 min longitude x 15 min latitude. Standard height contour interval was 50 feet.
- 1914: commenced geodetic triangulation (angles by theodolite, azimuth by astronomy and scale by baselines measured with metal tapes) replacing parish plans as the basis for topographic mapping
- 1923–1927: used No 1 Squadron, Royal Australian Air Force air photography to complement topographic survey by plane-tabling
- 1930–1933: the first map produced from a significant use of air photography for topographic compilation using graphical methods of perspective rectification – Albury, New South Wales, '1 mile' map. Work on this map highlighted the disparity between the Victoria and New South Wales state survey triangulation networks. The grid on this sheet was most likely the first instance of cartographic scribing in Australia, done by Warrant Officer Harry Raisbeck engraving the emulsion of a glass plate negative using one tip of a broken ruling pen for the thicker 10,000-yard grid lines and a steel needle to scribe the 1,000-yard grid. This was 23 years before the first map was fully scribed.
- 1933: adopted Sydney Observatory as the geodetic datum for the eastern states, the Clarke 1858 reference ellipsoid and a British modified map grid based on the Transverse Mercator map projection with Australian zones. The first map with the British modified grid, for artillery purposes, was Albury '1 mile' although it was on the polyconic projection. This grid system was used for Australian topographic mapping until 1966.
- 1934–1939: undertook a 1st Order geodetic survey triangulation program to connect Queensland, New South Wales, Victoria and South Australia into one coherent network. Cooke, Troughton and Sims Tavistock 5 1/2-inch theodolites, reading direct to half-second for 1st Order work, replaced the larger and heavier 8-inch instruments and 3 1/2-inch Tavistocks reading direct to one second were used for second order work. Baselines of four to six miles in length were placed every 200 to 250 miles and measured with invar tapes standardised by steel bands. The use of field thermometers to estimate temperature corrections for thermal expansion of the measuring bands, was replaced with a system of measuring electrical resistance to estimate temperature coefficient of expansion to achieve accuracies of about 1 in 1 million (1 mm in 1 km) of the measured baselines. This world class research and development was in conjunction with Professor Kerr Grant, Department of Physics of University of Adelaide. Baselines for connecting the eastern Australia trigonometric network were measured at Jondaryn (QLD), Somerton (NSW), Benambra (VIC) and Tarlee (SA).
- 1936: the first map produced on the Transverse Mercator projection and the British modified grid – Helidon, Queensland 'one-mile'
- 1936: the first map compiled entirely from overlapping strip of air photography and graphical methods of rectification (Arundel method of radial line plotting) – Sale, Victoria 'one-mile'.
- Second World War: many innovative adaptions of equipment and processes for surveying, aerial photography for topographic compilation, cartography, photo-lithography, various printing methods and battlefield terrain modelling in base and field mobile situations to provide rapid response military survey/mapping support under adverse conditions of extreme heat, cold, high humidity, dust and rain in desert and jungle environments and at times under enemy attack
- 1952: topographic mapping by multi-projector (Multiplex anaglyph) stereoplotting from overlapping air photography, replacing graphical methods of rectification for map compilation
- 1953: large format Klimsch Commodore cartographic camera (remained in continuous use until December 1978)
- 1956: changed to decimal (also known as metric) scale mapping, largely as part of standardisation with allies in the South East Asia Treaty Organisation and adoption of an improved Australian spheroid of reference for mapping, first map Mildura 1:50,000. The 'one-mile' map was discontinued in 1959.
- 1956: cartographic scribing of map detail replaced fair drawing with ink, first map Mildura 1:50,000
- 1957: helicopter transport of survey parties revolutionised transport in remote areas
- 1957: Geodimeter light-based electromagnetic distance measurement (EDM) equipment
- 1958: Tellurometer MRA1 microwave EDM (and later models) man-portable systems improved geodetic survey efficiencies for rapid network extension and densification replacing triangulation with EDM and theodolite traverse sometimes using Bilby Towers to extend line lengths
- 1960: adoption of the '165 Spheroid' in Australia (same as World Geodetic System 1960 spheroid)
- 1961: manual hill-shading of 1:250,000 maps by photographing carved wax terrain models from the north-west corner on the Klimsch camera
- 1962: Wild A9, B9, B8 optical/mechanical photogrammetric plotters for topographic compilation from super-wide angle (focal length 88.5mm) Wild RC9 air photography started to replace Multiplex plotters; presensitised lithographic printing plates
- 1963: Zeiss (Jena) Stecometer analytic stereocomparator for air photography; block aerotriangulation by digital computer; Aristo coordinatograph for grid production; radar airborne profile recorder (Canadian Applied Research Ltd, Mark V, Airborne Profiler Recorder)
- 1964: vehicle mounted Johnston ground elevation meter; Aerodist MRC2 airborne EDM system for topographic surveys over long distances by trilateration to replace traverse requiring survey station intervisibility
- 1966–1971: adopted the Australian Geodetic Datum 1966 (AGD66)/Australian Map Grid 1966 (AMG66)(Transverse Mercator projection – Universal Transverse Mercator Grid) and the Australian Height Datum 1971(AHD71)for all mapping of Australia and Papua New Guinea. The local datum AGD/AMG66 was used for surveying and mapping until it was replaced by the local datum AGD84 and later the geocentric datum World Geodetic System 1984 (WGS84)/Geodetic Datum Australia 1994 (GDA94).
- 1970: Calcomp 718 digital coordinatograph flat-bed plotter for grids, graticules and base compilation sheets with aerial triangulated model control
- 1971: Wild RC10 super wide angle air survey cameras with virtual distortion free lenses for supplementary, spot and special photography
- 1972: Aerodist MRB3/201 computer assisted second generation airborne EDM for topographic surveys
- 1972–1973: IBM 1130 computer; OMI/Nistri AP/C-3 analytical plotter with coordinatograph and OP/C orthophoto projector and Zeiss Planimat D2 stereoplotters with SG-1/GZ-1 orthophoto projectors for orthophoto production from colour and monochrome film air photography
- 1974–1975: Magnavox AN/PRR-14 portable Doppler satellite (US Navy Navigation Satellite System – TRANSIT) receivers and computing system provided independent three-dimensional point positions anywhere in the world, anytime, in any weather accurate to about 1.5metres with precise satellite ephemerides (station coordinates computed using program DOPPLR at Directorate of Survey – Army in Canberra ACT), to replace geodetic astronomy for absolute positioning and Aerodist airborne EDM; the Australian developed WREMAPS II airborne laser terrain profile recorder to replace terrain heighting by barometry for 1:100,000 mapping; grid and graticule production on Footscray Ammunition Factory's Gerber flatbed plotter
- 1975: AUTOMAP 1 computer assisted cartography and mapping system (Input Sub-System of four Wild B8s and three Gradicon digitising tables, Optical Line Following Sub-System – Gerber OLF, Verification Sub-System – Gerber 1442 drum plotter, General Purpose Sub-system – HP21MX computer and Output Sub-System – Gerber 1232 flatbed plotter), the first map was published in 1978 (Strickland 3665–3, 1:50,000)
- 1977: PDP 11/70 computer and OMI/C-3T and AP/C-4 analytical plotters
- 1978: new cartographic specifications (SYMBAS Symbolisation All Scales) for map and air chart production by digital cartographic methods
- 1982: Schut's Bundle analytic adjustment was set up on the PDP 11/70 to augment the Schut polynomial strip adjustment of block air photography triangulation; Magnavox MX1502 second generation TRANSIT receivers for relative positioning
- 1983: Kongsberg flatbed plotter for air triangulation output and associated grids
- 1983–1984: AUTOMAP 2-second generation computer assisted cartography and mapping system as a precursor to collection of digital geographic information and creation of Geographic Information Systems in support of emerging digital military systems. Supplied by Intergraph Pty Ltd it comprised; superimposition of compiled graphics in the optical train of Wild B8 stereoplotters, dual screen interactive graphic edit workstations, raster scanner/plotter, VAX computers (the first map published was De Grey 2757 1:100,000 including screens and stipples)
- 1986–1988: Texas Instruments TI4100 portable Global Positioning System (GPS) geodetic receivers and Ferranti FILS3 helicopter and vehicle mounted Inertial Positioning System to replace TRANSIT satellite receivers
- 1988–1990: established the baseline for a GPS controlled air camera and photogrammetric system to significantly reduce the requirement for ground survey to accurately control air photography for topographic mapping
- 1988–1992: adopted the World Geodetic System 1984 (WGS84 – used by GPS) as the reference framework and spheroid for all military geospatial products of Australia and the rest of the world. In 1994 the Australian Government adopted the Geodetic Datum Australia 1994 which for practical purposes is coincident with the World Geodetic System 1984 (WGS84). The associated map grids remain based on the Transverse Mercator projection.
- 1990: Heidelberg Speedmaster 102 five colour printing press; AUTOMAP 2 upgrade to increase storage capacity and computer memory to speed-up data processing, to process all forms of remotely sensed imagery, to install the inhouse developed automated masking and stippling system, to enhance production of Digital Elevation Models, and to further develop the aeronautical chart database; large format film colour processor; large format automatic printing plate processor for positive and negative processing; investigated techniques for rapid kinematic GPS surveys
- 1990–1992: participation with military allies, Canada, United Kingdom and United States, in research and development of digital geospatial product standards to produce the Digital Chart of the World (DCW) and associated standards which became the baseline for international exchange of digital geospatial information
- 1991: Wild RC10 air mapping camera, pod mounted in a chartered Air Scan Aust Pty Ltd 35A Lear Jet, operated by the RA Svy Aerial Photography Team; established a digital topographic data Portable Demonstration System; Optical Disk Storage and Retrieval System for mainly AUTOMAP 2 data; desktop and laptop computers with mapping software for field survey, topographic survey and military geographic information sections; printing quality control stations; large format plan printers for topographic survey sections; air photography film processors for field units
- 1993–1995: high capacity large format process print press for rapid response map printing and print on demand

== Acknowledgement of Corps history ==
On 1 July 2015, on the occasion of the Centenary of the Royal Australian Survey Corps Wreathlaying Ceremony at the Australian War Memorial, His Excellency General the Honourable Sir Peter Cosgrove AK MC (Retd), Governor-General of the Commonwealth of Australia, delivered the commemorative address. He acknowledged the essential nature of mapping for military operations, the work that the Survey Corps did for conflicts around the world and also for the nation building of Australia. He said "But it is the active service, the sacrifices and the contributions made by the men and women of the Royal Australian Survey Corps that we commemorate here today. On this 100th anniversary, we pay tribute to those whose skill and passion for surveying became integral to the work of the Australian military. And of course we offer our deepest respects to the 20 men who have given their lives serving with the Survey Corps or as members of the ADF on military survey operations. It was their duty to serve and it is our duty to remember them—and that is what we do today, and every day."

On 9 July 2007, His Excellency Major General Michael Jeffery AC CVO MC Governor-General of the Commonwealth of Australia, unveiled a plaque at the Australian War Memorial to commemorate Royal Australian Survey Corps units which served in war. In his address the Governor-General praised the efforts of all personnel of the Corps over its 81 years of service to the nation in both war and peace.

On the occasion of the 75th Anniversary of the Corps in 1990, the Survey Corps' contribution to the effectiveness of the ADF was acknowledged in a Notice of Motion from the Senate of the Australian Parliament. Moved by Senator MacGibbon on 31 May 1990, the Notice states: "I give notice that, on the next day of sitting, I shall move:

That the Senate – (a) notes that 1 July 1990 marks the 75th anniversary of the foundation of the Royal Australian Survey Corps which produces maps and aeronautical charts required by Australia's defence forces; (b) notes that from the time of the explorer Sir Thomas Mitchell, Surveyor General NSW, who as a Lieutenant on Wellington's staff served as a surveyor in the Peninsular War, military surveying has played a vital role in the mapping of and development of Australia; (c) acknowledges the Corps' contribution to the knowledge of Australia's geography, topography and environment; (d) notes that the Royal Australian Survey Corps with its high level of professionalism, has served Australia well in war and in peace; (e) acknowledges the valuable mapping service rendered to New Guinea, Indonesia and the south west Pacific by the Survey Corps as part of Australia's overseas aid program; and (f) congratulates the Royal Australian Survey Corps on its meritorious achievements through the 75 years of existence." Also on the 75th anniversary, Australia Post issued a commemorative first day issue prestamped envelope of the Royal Australian Survey Corps.

In his official history of the Royal Australian Survey Corps as part of the Australian Army History Series, the much published author and highly regarded military historian, Chris D. Coulthard-Clark, concluded that "Australians as a whole might still be blissfully unaware and hence unappreciative of the debt of gratitude owed to the generations of surveyors who have helped make possible the enviable standard of living generally enjoyed today across the country. Should that situation ever change, and the story receive the wider recognition that it deserves, then the part within that tale occupied by military mapmakers is worthy of special acclaim by a grateful nation."

== Gallery – Corps badges and unit colour patches ==

On the left is the coloured badge of the Australian Survey Corps 1915–1948. In the middle is the unit colour patch of Survey Corps units in the 2nd AIF (Second World War) from 1943 – it is based on the colour patch of the First World War 1st ANZAC and Australian Corps Topographic Sections. The triangle shape shows that Survey Corps units were generally assigned at higher formation (Corps) level; the colour purple (Engineers) acknowledges the heritage link to the Royal Australian Engineers and the central vertical white stripe completed the Survey patch; the grey background was that of the 2nd AIF – this patch (minus the AIF grey background) was the basis of Survey Corps unit colour patches when Army reintroduced unit colour patches in 1987. On the right is the coloured badge of the Royal Australian Survey Corps 1952–1996. The badge 1948–1952 was similar except for the Kings Crown.

== See also ==
- Royal Australian Engineers
- Australian Army Intelligence Corps
