= 4th Field Survey Squadron (Australia) =

4 Field Survey Squadron
- Active: February 1952 – 3 April 1996
- Country: Australia
- Branch: Australian Army
- Type: Unit
- Role: Military Survey
- Mottos: Videre Parare Est (Latin: "To See is to Prepare") (Note: The motto is that of the Royal Australian Survey Corps and was approved in 1965.)
- Anniversaries: Unit birthday 1 February
- Engagements: 4 Field Survey Squadron was not awarded Battle honours.

Insignia
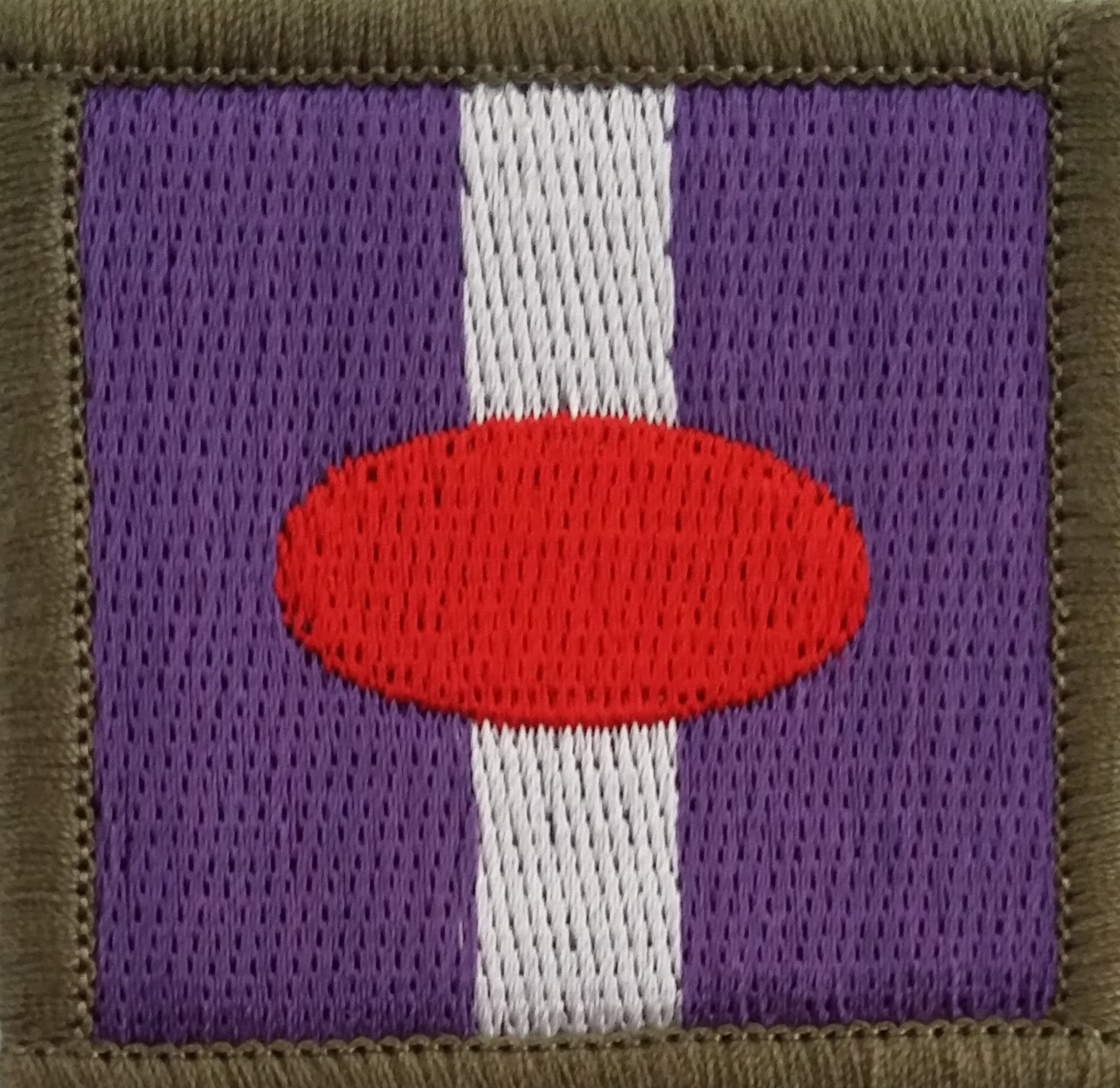
- 4 Fd Svy Sqn Unit Colour Patch

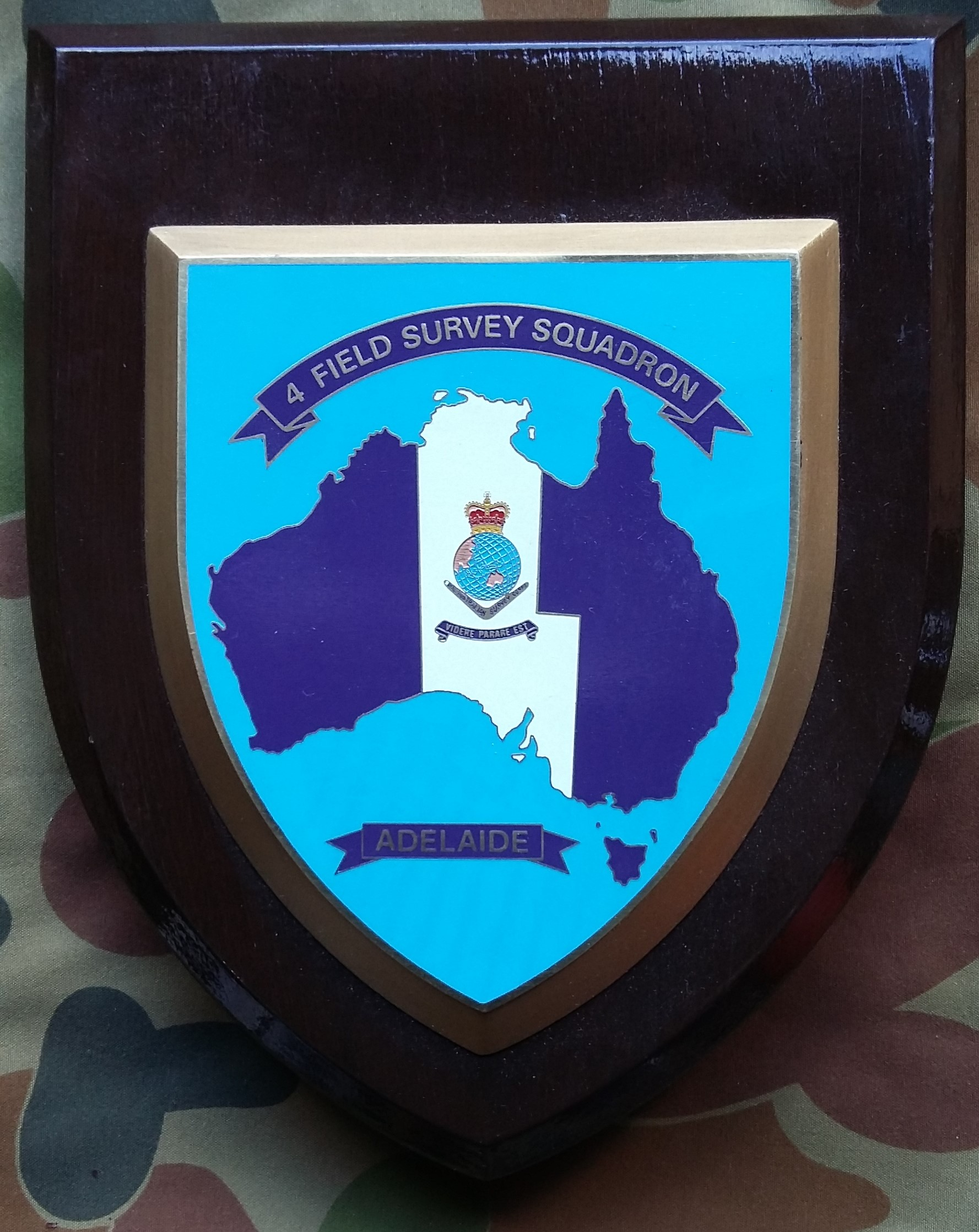
- Unit plaque

4 Field Survey Squadron (4 Fd Svy Sqn) was a field survey (topographic) unit of the Australian Army and the Royal Australian Survey Corps (RA Svy) based in Adelaide, South Australia. Raised in February 1952 it was disbanded on 1 May 1996. The unit's role was to conduct geodetic surveys, topographic surveys, compile and cartographically complete topographic maps, acquire aerial mapping photography and to distribute topographic products for land combat operations. The unit's primary area of responsibility was South Australia and the Northern Territory but the squadron was tasked for operations in Queensland, Victoria, Papua New Guinea (1972–1974) and nations in the South West Pacific Area (1986–1994).

== Organisation ==
A systematic military survey program commenced in Australia in 1910. Early field surveys and mapping were concentrated around capital cities and important port facilities. In the late-1920s a sub-section of the Survey Section – Royal Australian Engineers (Permanent) moved from Brisbane, Queensland to Adelaide, South Australia to commence work there.

During the Second World War there were no army survey units based in South Australia but military survey maps were produced as part of the emergency mapping program in collaboration with the State Lands Department. The Northern Territory 7th Field Survey Section was relieved in April 1943 by 1 Section, 6th Army Topographic Survey Company after serving for two years in that theatre. Section 1 remained in Northern Australia until war's end.

From 1946 to 1951 Army Headquarters (AHQ) Field Survey Section (Melbourne VIC) and a detachment from 5th Field Survey Company (Sydney NSW) conducted surveys in South Australia for nationally important projects such as the Woomera Rocket Range and industrial development around the upper Spencer Gulf areas of Whyalla, Port Augusta and Port Pirie. AHQ Field Survey Section (Central Command Detachment) with an establishment of three officers and twenty-two other ranks was formed in Adelaide at Largs Bay in February 1952 to take responsibility for mapping of Woomera and military mapping in all parts of the state. The section was redesignated Central Command Field Survey Section in 1953 moving into Hampstead Barracks and then moving to Keswick Barracks in 1954. The unit was redesignated Central Command Field Survey Unit in 1961 moving to the old cavalry stables in what became a part of a purpose built facility occupied in 1973. In 1970 the unit was reassigned as 4th Field Survey Squadron with an increased establishment of five officers and seventy-five other ranks until that was reduced in the mid-1970s to five officers and forty-seven other ranks. In 1973 command of the unit moved from the regional command (HQ 4th Military District – Keswick Barracks, Adelaide, SA) to the functional command structure under HQ Field Force Command – Victoria Barracks, Sydney, NSW. This organisation remained until the major Corps restructure in 1989/90 when the unit was the only remaining Corps field survey unit in Australia and was moved under the command of the Army Survey Regiment. At this time it was increased in strength to nine officers and sixty-eight other ranks. Command changed again in 1993 when 4 Fd Svy Sqn was again a direct command unit of Land Command until it was disbanded in 1996. On disbandment the personnel establishment was transferred to augment 1st Topographic Survey Squadron to enhance the field deployable survey capability.

== Operations ==
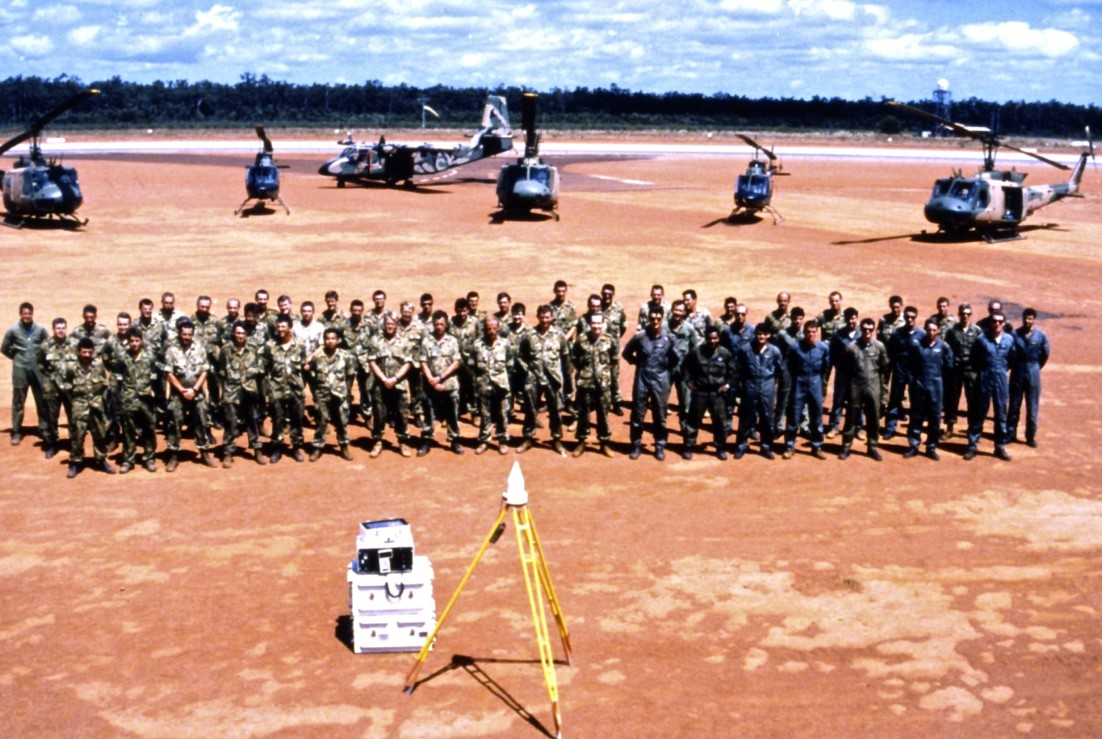
Operation Nervose 1992 – 4 Field Survey Squadron and supporting Australian Army Aviation Corps personnel assembled behind a Global Positioning System TI4100 Geodetic Receiver at Nhulumbuy, East Arnhem Land, Northern Territory

All four Australian based field survey squadrons (1,2,4 and 5 Fd Svy Sqns) had the capability to conduct geodetic and topographic surveys, compile maps to the pre-cartographic draughting stage from aerial photography using photogrammetric methods, field check preliminary maps and acquire aerial photography to identify survey stations. From the late-1970s field survey units could cartographically complete maps to the pre-press stage. From 1990, 4 Fd Svy Sqn had the capability to acquire large-block mapping quality aerial photography. From 1981 to 1994 personnel from the squadron co-operated the joint Aust/US permanent fixed Global Positioning System (GPS) station at Smithfield SA. Data from this station contributed to the post-orbit computation, by the US Defense Mapping Agency, of the precise GPS satellite ephemerides for geodetic surveys. In addition to standard survey and mapping operations, the squadron was responsible for surveys and mapping of military training areas and defence installations and was routinely tasked with a miscellany of survey work.

The units' operations 1946 to 1995 were summarised by the last Officer Commanding, Major Peter Demaine, in an article in the Canberra Survey Corps Association Newsletter. Many of the operation reports are published of the RA Svy Associations website.

Topographic surveys for scale 1:100,000 topographic mapping in the Northern Territory (1967–1968) and Territory of Papua and New Guinea (1972–1974) were conducted primarily by airborne distance measurement systems Aerodist MRC2 and MRB3/201. From 1974 to 1991 the unit used Transit Doppler satellite geodetic receivers (AN/PRR-14 and MX-1502) for geodetic and topographic surveys in Australia mainly for scale 1:50,000 topographic mapping and in South-West Pacific nations to assist them define their Exclusive Economic Zones.

== See also ==
- Royal Australian Survey Corps
- 8th Field Survey Squadron
