= Lee Valley Tools =

Canadian woodworking and gardening product company

Lee Valley Tools Ltd.

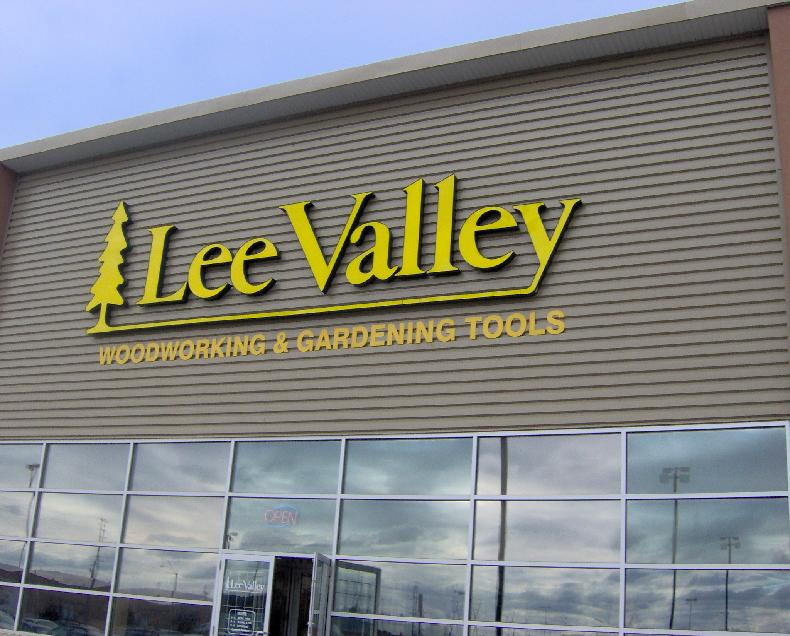
- Type: Private
- Industry: Tools
- Founded: Ottawa, Ontario, Canada (1978)
- Founder: Leonard Lee
- Headquarters: Ottawa, Ontario, Canada
- Number of locations: 20
- Area served: Canada
- Key people: Robin Lee (CEO); Jason Tasse (President & COO)
- Products: Woodworking and Gardening Tools
- Website: www.leevalley.com

Lee Valley Tools Ltd. is a family-owned Canadian business specializing in tools and gifts for woodworking and gardening.

== History ==
Lee Valley Tools was founded in 1978, in Ottawa, Ontario, by Leonard Lee, a recipient of the Order of Canada. Over the next ten years, the company opened several more stores in Toronto and Vancouver, and started manufacturing its own line of tools (starting with the Veritas Dovetail Marker in 1982). Since then, it has continued opening stores, manufacturing more diverse tools, and selling through mail order and the internet.

In 1998, Canica Design was launched. Canica is a medical design company associated with Lee Valley Tools which arose out of consultations between Leonard Lee and surgeon Michael Bell after Lee found that Bell was using Lee Valley tools in his plastic surgery practice.

Partly because of the company policy of enforcing and codifying the concept of "pay slope" limiting the pay at the highest levels in the company based on what the lowest paid employees earn, Lee Valley Tools earned a slot in the Forbes Top 500 Employers list in 2018.

In 2023, Lee Valley Tools had 18 stores, accounting for about half of its sales.

== Consumer sales ==
The primary business is mail-order and retail, purveying mainly woodworking and gardening tools and equipment, as well as woodworking hardware, cookware and gifts. The consumer part of the business runs under the main company name, Lee Valley Tools. In the retail stores customers make their selections from a catalogue (originally paper, now electronic), fill out a form listing what they want, and then wait for their number to be called for assistance. When the number is called, staff will locate and retrieve the items from the warehouse.

== Veritas Tools ==
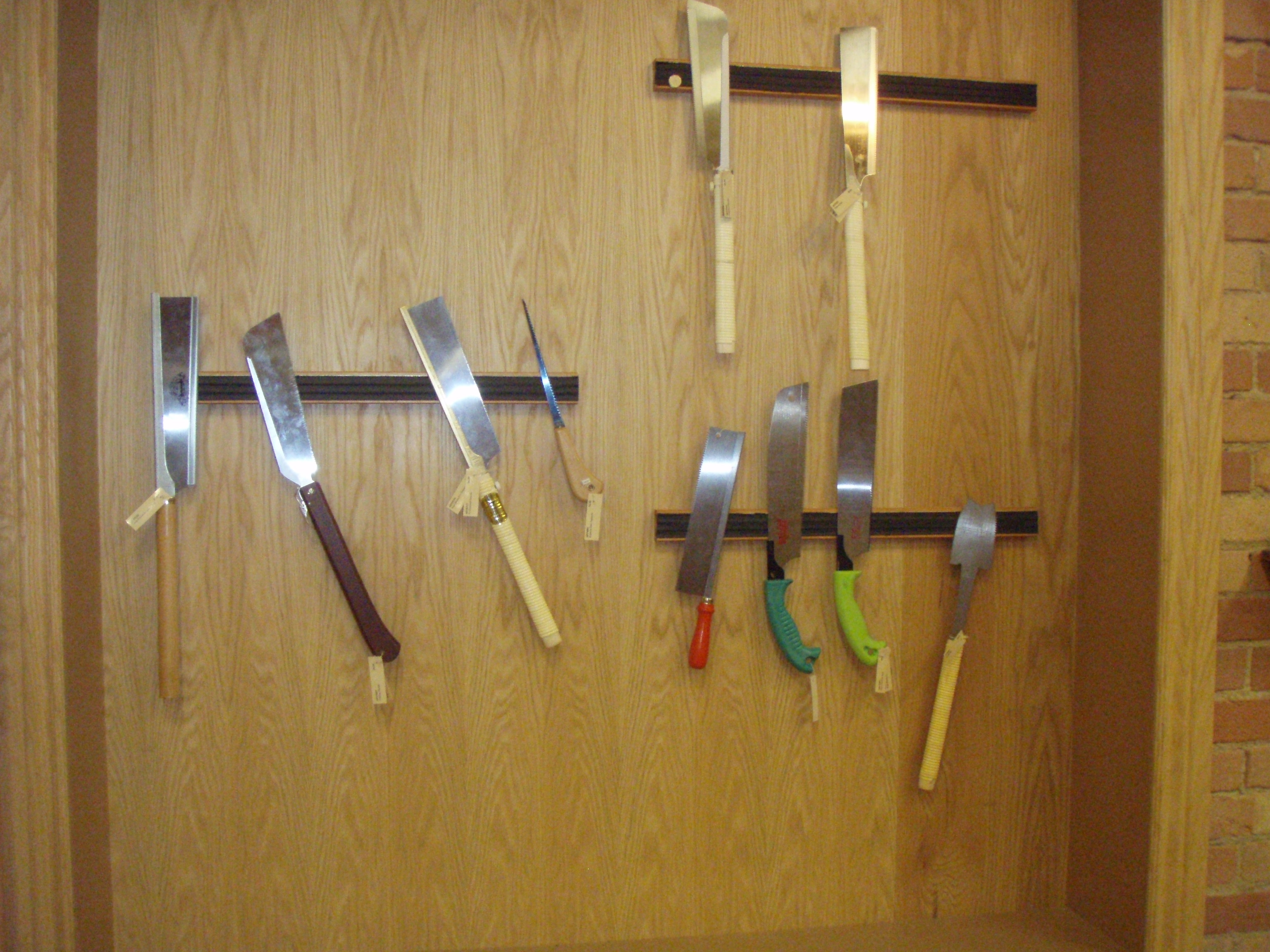
Various Lee Valley tools

Lee Valley also has a manufacturing arm, called Veritas Tools. Veritas makes many woodworking hand-tools, including hand planes, marking gauges and other measuring tools, router tables, sharpening systems, and numerous other gadgets. Veritas does research and development activities for the factory line, and has developed and patented many innovative designs.
