= Wood scribe =

Tool for marking wood

A wood scribe is a tool for marking wood by scratching the surface visibly. A wood scribe is often used with a try square for accurate scribing. A marking gauge is a more specific form of wood scribe used to accurately mark wood for cutting, often for laying out mortise and tenon joints.

== See also ==
- Scratch awl
- Scriber
- Marking knife
- Marking gauge
