= Leonard Lee =

Leonard Lee CM
- Born: July 17, 1938; Wadena, Saskatchewan, Canada
- Died: July 7, 2016 (aged 77); Ottawa, Ontario, Canada
- Education: Royal Roads Military College; Queen's University
- Occupation: Businessman
- Known for: Founder of Lee Valley Tools

Leonard G. Lee CM (July 17, 1938 – July 7, 2016) was a Canadian entrepreneur and founder of Lee Valley Tools and Canica Design. Lee was born in 1938 in Wadena, Sask., and grew up in a log cabin without electricity or running water.

He received a diploma in civil engineering from Royal Roads Military College and a Bachelor of Economics degree in 1963 from Queen's University. He worked for the federal government for sixteen years as a topographical surveyor, member of the Canadian Foreign Service and civil servant in the Department of Industry.

In 1978, he founded Lee Valley Tools, a Canadian woodworking and gardening tools mail-order business which has since grown into a multimillion-dollar enterprise. In 1985, he founded Veritas Tools. In 1991, he founded Algrove Publishing. In 1998, with his son Robin running Lee Valley Tools, Lee started a new business, Canica Design, a medical/surgical instrument company, headquartered in Almonte, Ontario.

In 2002, he was made a Member of the Order of Canada for "being a successful entrepreneur." In 2007, he was granted an honorary degree from the Royal Military College of Canada in Kingston, Ontario. In 2011, he was granted an honorary doctorate from the University of Ottawa. Lee died on July 7, 2016, from effects of vascular dementia.

== Bibliography ==
- The Complete Guide to Sharpening. Taunton Press, 1995. ISBN 1-56158-067-8 (hard cover) ISBN 1-56158-125-9 (soft cover).
