= 1st Intelligence Battalion (Australia) =

Australian Army unit

- Active: 1999–current
- Role: Intelligence collection and analysis
- Part of: 1st Division
- Motto(s): Periculum aliis arcete ("Keeping others from danger")

The 1st Intelligence Battalion is an Australian Army unit responsible for collecting and analysing intelligence. It was formed in 1999.

== History ==
=== Formation ===
The 1st Intelligence Battalion was established in 1999. The Australian Army's website states that the unit "traces its history from Australian Intelligence Corps units and organisations formed before the Vietnam War, with a legacy to 1 Division and 2 Division Intelligence Companies".

=== Recent developments ===
On 1 March 2010, the battalion became part of the 6th Brigade when it was re-raised to command the Army's command support and intelligence, surveillance and target acquisition units. In 2014 the 1st Topographic Survey Squadron, formed as a unit of the Royal Australian Survey Corps, was transferred into the battalion from the 6th Engineer Support Regiment.

Teams and individual personnel from the 1st Intelligence Battalion have been deployed in support of all Australian Defence Force deployments since the unit was established. In April 2015 the Army's in-house newspaper reported that "for the first time since being raised the ... battalion had no formed bodies on deployment".

Until 2008 the 1st Intelligence Battalion comprised only members of the Australian Intelligence Corps. Since that time, members of other corps of the Army as well as personnel from the Royal Australian Navy and Royal Australian Air Force have been posted to the battalion to serve as human intelligence operators or interrogators. The 1st Intelligence Battalion maintains teams of specialists on short notice to deploy from the unit's base at Brisbane. As of 2014, the unit's roles included collecting and analysing human intelligence, psychological warfare and information operations. In addition, it was capable of conducting topographical surveys and collecting and making use of geospatial intelligence. At this time the 1st Intelligence Battalion included an All Source Cell which aimed to combine and analyze different sources of intelligence, as well as capabilities to exploit intelligence.

When the 6th Brigade was disbanded in December 2024 the 1st Intelligence Battalion was temporarily assigned to the direct command of the 1st Division. It will transfer to the 10th Brigade in late 2025.

== See also ==
- 7th Signal Regiment (Australia)
- Defence Intelligence Organisation
