= Australian Army Intelligence Corps =

Administrative corps of the Australian Army

Australian Intelligence Corps
- Badge
- Active: 1907–14; 1939–present
- Country: Australia
- Allegiance: Australian Army
- Branch: Army
- Type: Corps
- Role: Military intelligence
- Mottos: "Forewarned, Forearmed"
- Anniversaries: 6 December

Commanders
- Current commander: Colonel Matt Cridland, Head of Corps (AUSTINT)
- Ceremonial chief: The Princess Royal, Colonel-in-Chief of the Royal Australian Corps of Signals.

Insignia
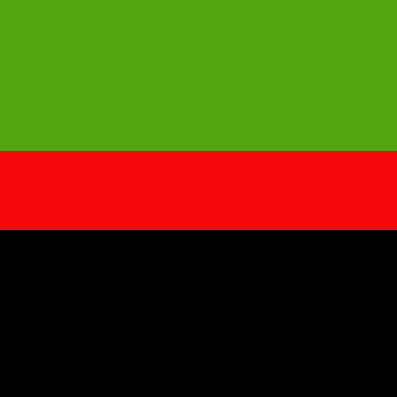
- Colours
- Abbreviation: AUSTINT

The Australian Intelligence Corps (AUSTINT) is a corps within the Australian Army. It was formed on 6 December 1907 and provides intelligence personnel in every formation headquarters in the Army. As of 2007, the corps consisted of "169 officers and 232 other ranks".

== Role ==
The role of the Australian Intelligence Corps is to provide intelligence support, consisting of knowledge of the enemy and the area of operations. Its role also includes active and passive measures undertaken to prevent the enemy from acquiring intelligence about friendly forces and their intentions.

== History ==
The corps was formed on 6 December 1907 with the aim of providing training for soldiers in intelligence work, including collecting and recording topographic and military information about Australia, its dependencies and foreign countries (especially those of the Pacific region), as well as preparing strategic and tactical maps and plans. The first Director of Military Intelligence was Lieutenant Colonel James Whiteside McCay.

The corps was disbanded on 30 September 1914 and replaced by Intelligence Sections of the General Staff in each Australian military district. It was re-formed in 1939 and was tasked with the following: intelligence; security; passport control; rail, air and shipping security; censorship; and prisoner of war interrogation and data compilation. The corps has been formally allied with the British Army Intelligence Corps since 1950.

== Corps Embellishments ==
The AUSTINT badge

The AUSTINT colours are green on scarlet on black. Green symbolises the Corps' alliance with the British Army Intelligence Corps, black for the Corps' links with the Australian Staff Corps and scarlet, signifying the Corps combat support role.

The AUSTINT badge was modelled on the British Army Intelligence Corps badge and accepted in 1953. It has the motif of a white and red Tudor rose which is flanked by laurel leaves and rests on a scroll inscribed with "Australian Intelligence Corps". A crown surmounts the whole motif. The Rose symbolises security, confidentiality and trustworthiness, derived from the Cromwellian use of a rose displayed to indicate when secret matters were being discussed. The laurel wreath depicts honour and the crown represents allegiance to the Sovereign.

== Training ==
Members of the Intelligence Corps work in the following areas:

- Intelligence analysis;
- Combat intelligence;
- Security intelligence;
- Language translation and interpretation;
- Electronic warfare;
- Human intelligence;
- Counter intelligence;
- Imagery intelligence;
- Geospatial intelligence;
- Multi-Media; and
- Psychological operations.

Recruits can now join AUSTINT through direct entry. Soldiers accepted into the Intelligence Corps attend 11 weeks employment training, consisting of a three-week introduction course and an eight-week land intelligence course. Both courses are conducted at the Defence Intelligence Training Centre in Canungra, Queensland. Training for Intelligence Corps soldiers is broken into two main streams, text and diagram. Officers are able to enter the Intelligence Corps after completing their officer course at the Royal Military College, Duntroon. However they must undergo a rigorous selection process before being employed in the Corps.

Intelligence Corps staff work with the Defence Intelligence Organisation, Defence Signals Directorate and Defence Security Authority. There are also intelligence officers and staff on most of the major Army commands and headquarters providing operational or counter intelligence support.

== See also ==
- 1st Intelligence Battalion (Australia)
- Defence Intelligence Organisation
- Australian Geospatial-Intelligence Organisation
- Australian Signals Directorate
- Australian Secret Intelligence Service
- Australian Security Intelligence Organisation

== Notes ==
Preceded by Australian Army Aviation Corps	Australian Army Order of Precedence	Succeeded by Royal Australian Army Chaplains Department
