= 1st Topographic Survey Squadron =

- Country: Australia
- Allegiance: Royal Australian Survey Corps until 1996; Royal Australian Engineers 1996 - present
- Branch: Army
- Type: Squadron, topographical survey
- Part of: 6th Engineer Support Regiment (2003–2013); 1st Intelligence Battalion (2014 – present)
- Garrison/HQ: Brisbane

The 1st Topographic Survey Squadron is a unit of the Australian Army. It provides mapping support the Army. The squadron was originally part of the Royal Australian Survey Corps which reintegrated with Royal Australian Engineers on 1 July 1996. It was an independent squadron until 13 January 2003 when it became part of the new 6th Engineer Support Regiment. In 2014 the squadron came under the command of the 1st Intelligence Battalion.
