= Mortise gauge =

Woodworking tool for scribing mortise and tenon joints

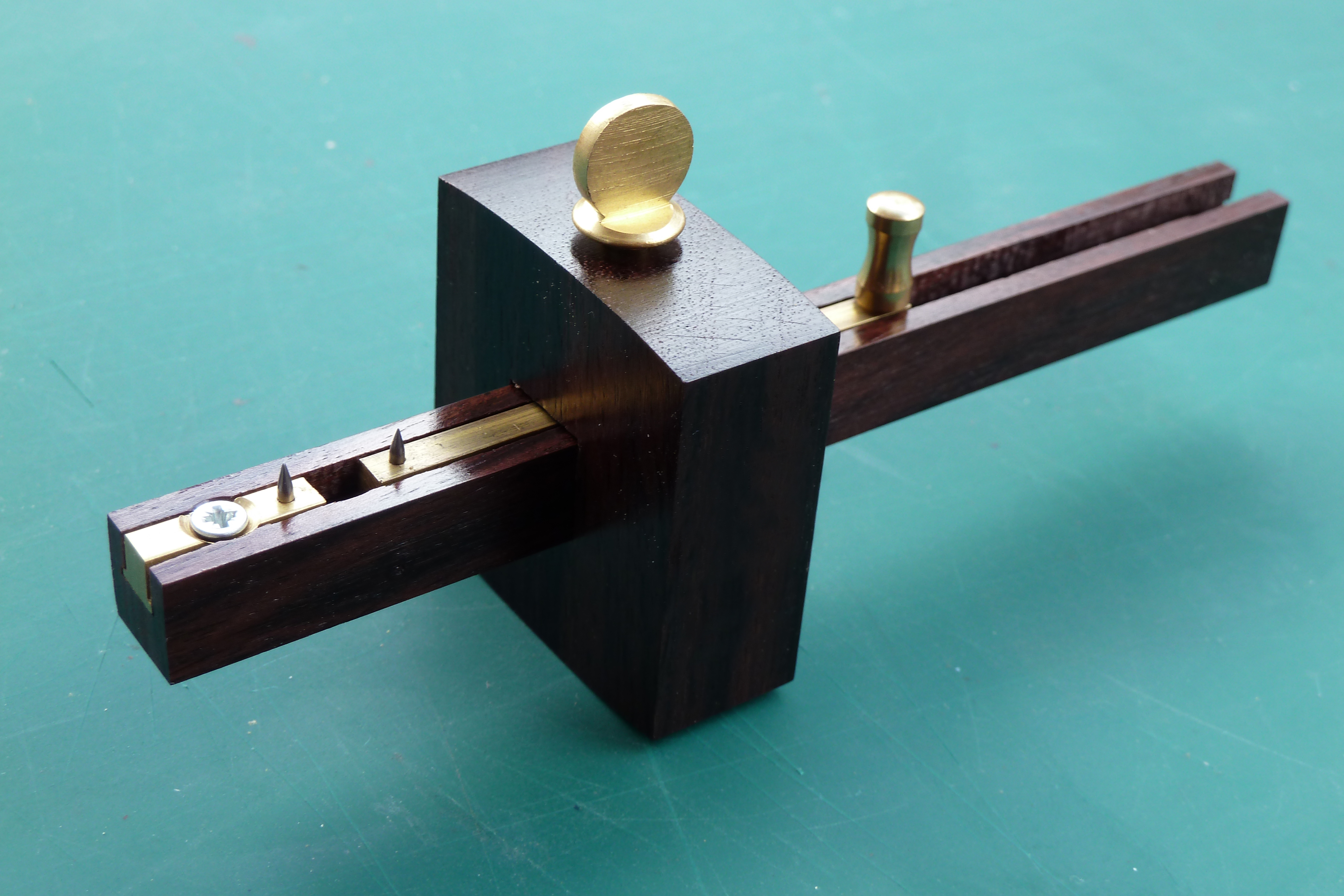
- Hardwood mortise gauge with brass fittings
- Other names: Mortice gauge
- Classification: Woodworking marking tool

A mortise gauge or mortice gauge is a woodworking tool used by a carpenter or joiner to scribe mortise and tenon joints on wood prior to cutting. Mortise gauges are commonly made of hardwood with brass fittings.

Like the simpler marking gauge, a mortise gauge has a locking thumb screw slide for adjusting the distance of the scribe from the edge of the wood. It has two protruding pins, often called "spurs", which are designed to scribe parallel lines marking both sides of a mortise at the same time. One of the pins is adjustable, attached to a sliding fence, so that mortises of different widths can be marked.

Some mortise gauges are designed with one retractable spur, so that they can be used as marking gauges as well; however, because the mortise gauge is an expensive and high precision tool, many carpenters prefer to have a separate marking gauge for general use.

For complex joints, some mortise gauges have a double-beam design which allows the gauge to be wrapped around a tool such as a chisel for extra accuracy.
