= Scribe (name) =

Scribe may be a surname or a nickname of the following persons:

== Surname ==
- Anthony Scribe (born 1988) French professional footballer
- Eugène Scribe, a French dramatist
- Murdo Scribe (1920–1983) Swampy Cree World War II veteran and writer

== Other ==
- Aldred the Scribe (fl. 10th century) priest
- Jeshbab the Scribe, (fl. 2nd century), Jewish Tanna sage
- Scribe (rapper), a New Zealand rap/hip-hop artist
