= Scribe Software =

Scribe Software may refer to:

- Tibco scribe, a product acquired by Tibco in 2018 formerly known as Scribe Software
- Table Top Scribe System, a hardware / software digitizing solution developed by the Internet Archive
