= Scribing (cartography) =

Scribing was used to produce lines for cartographic map compilations before the use of computer-based geographic information systems. Lines produced by manual scribing are sharp, clear and even.

An impression of the corrected compilation sheet is photographed onto scribe sheet material or drawn using pencil. While working over a light table, lines on the scribe sheet are traced with a metal or sapphire-tipped scribe tool to remove thin lines of translucent coating to produce a handmade negative image. This compares with drafting, where an ink image is made on tracing paper by depositing ink using a pen to produce a positive image. Scribing produces a result superior to drafting, but is more time-consuming. A separate stylus is required for each thickness of line required. For example, a contour line might require a 0.15mm stylus whereas a major road might require a 0.5mm stylus.

The scribe sheet is made of a stable plastic base material and coated with a material which is designed for easy removal using a scribing tool to produce a cleanly cut line. Various colours are used, and orange is said to produce the least eye-strain for the cartographer.

One scribe sheet is produced for each map colour. Corrections can be made by "duffing" (re-coating) the scribe sheet with special duffing liquid. The detail can then be re-scribed. Printing plates are produced from the finished scribe sheets, one for each colour of the map.

== Scribe tools ==
A tripod or trolley arrangement is used to hold the scribe stylus. A stylus of the required thickness is set in the trolley and the surface material is removed by applying light pressure as the trolley is moved over the image. Care must be taken to ensure the base material is not gouged or distorted.

Either a round point or chisel point stylus may be used. Chisel points must be set at right angles to the direction of movement. As well as single line gravers, double and triple lines can be produced with double and triple graver styluses. Small circles can be produced using motorised versions of scribing tools, and symbols, figures etc., can be produced using plastic or metal templates.

== Area symbols ==
‘Peelcoat’ is used to produce a negative of an area of detail such as a lake or forest. The border of the area is cut or scribed on the peelcoat and the coat of the sheet within the area is peeled off to produce a negative image.

A stipple pattern can be used to produce an area symbol over the peeled surface. A stipple sheet with a simple repeating symbol (such as that for swamp or sand) is combined with the area by photographing the stipple onto the peelcoat.
