= Marking gauge =

Type of measuring tool for woodworking and metalworking

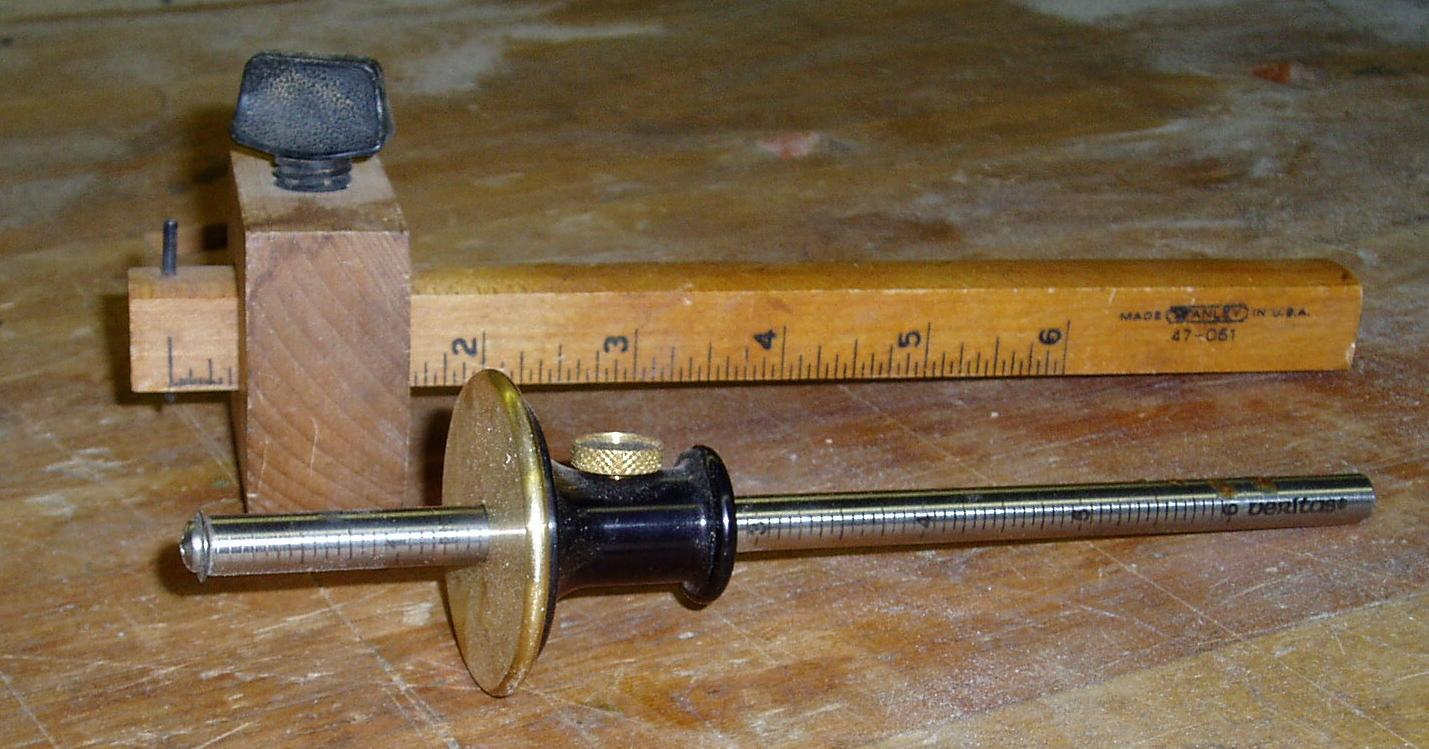
Stanley and Veritas marking gauges

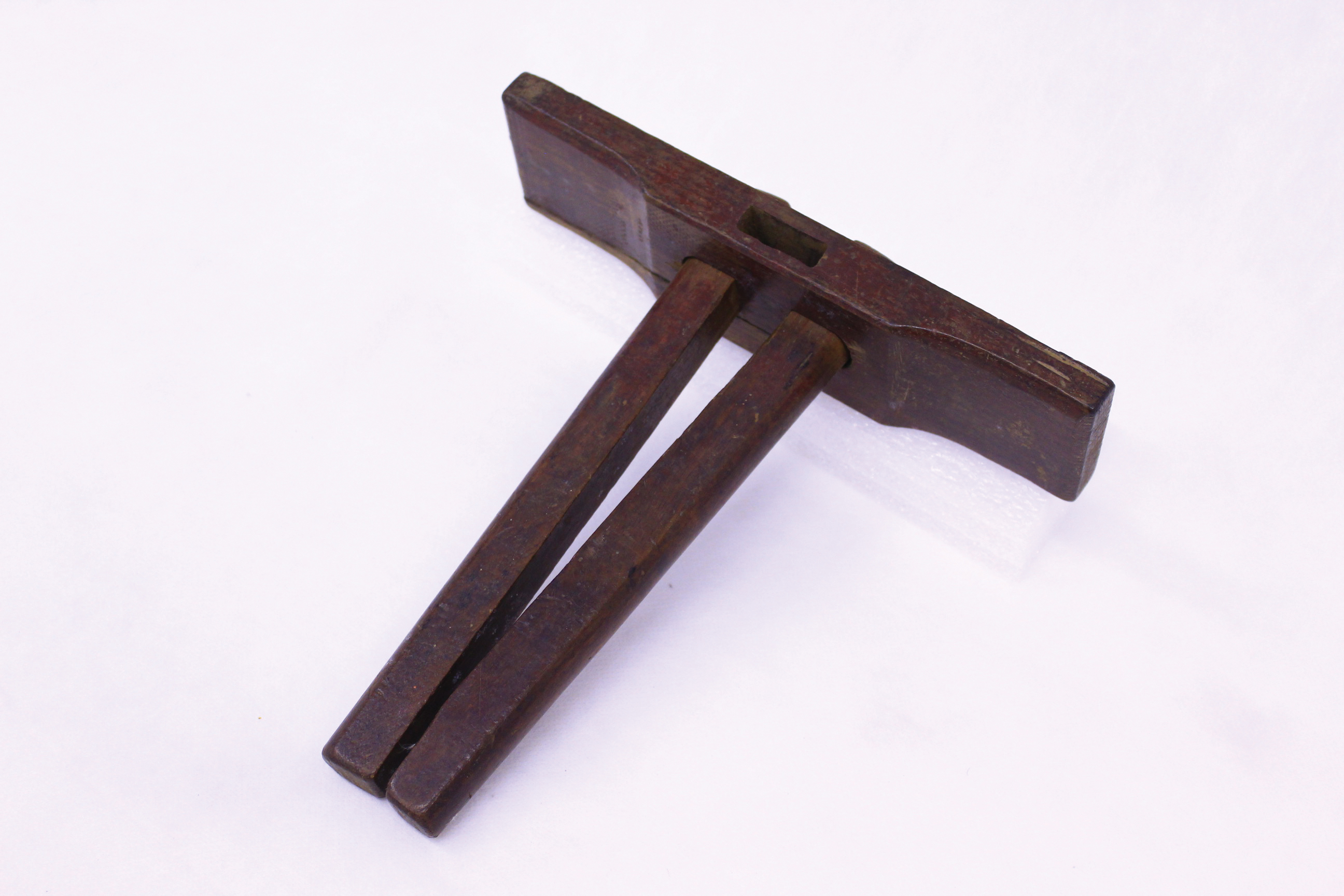

A marking gauge, also known as a scratch gauge, is used in woodworking and metalworking to mark out lines for cutting or other operations. The purpose of the gauge is to scribe a line parallel to a reference edge or surface. It is used in joinery and sheetmetal operations.

The gauge consists of a beam, a headstock, and a scribing or marking implement, typically a pin, knife, pen or wheel. The headstock slides along the beam, and is locked in place by various means: a locking screw, cam lever, or a wedge. The marking implement is fixed to one end of the beam.

== Types ==
The marking implement is chosen depending upon the operation to be performed. Some marking gauges have the capability for a number of implements to be fitted, others do not; a woodworker will often have a number of different types. A steel pin is used when scribing with the grain, a steel knife when scribing across the grain. The pen or pencil is used when the woodworker does not wish the surface to be permanently marked. Generally speaking, the pin and knife yield more accurate marking than do the pen or pencil. It is also used to mark parallel lines to the face side and edge side.

=== Variations ===
The style of gauge which uses a knife instead of a pin is often described as a cutting gauge. This tool is sometimes used to slightly "mark" the wood before a cut to prevent tearout later when doing the main cut with for example a circular saw.

Other variations include a panel gauge which has a longer beam and larger headstock for scribing lines that are further from the reference edge. A mortise gauge has two pins that can be adjusted relative to each other at the end of the beam. This gauge is used to scribe two lines simultaneously and is most commonly used to lay out mortise and tenon joinery.

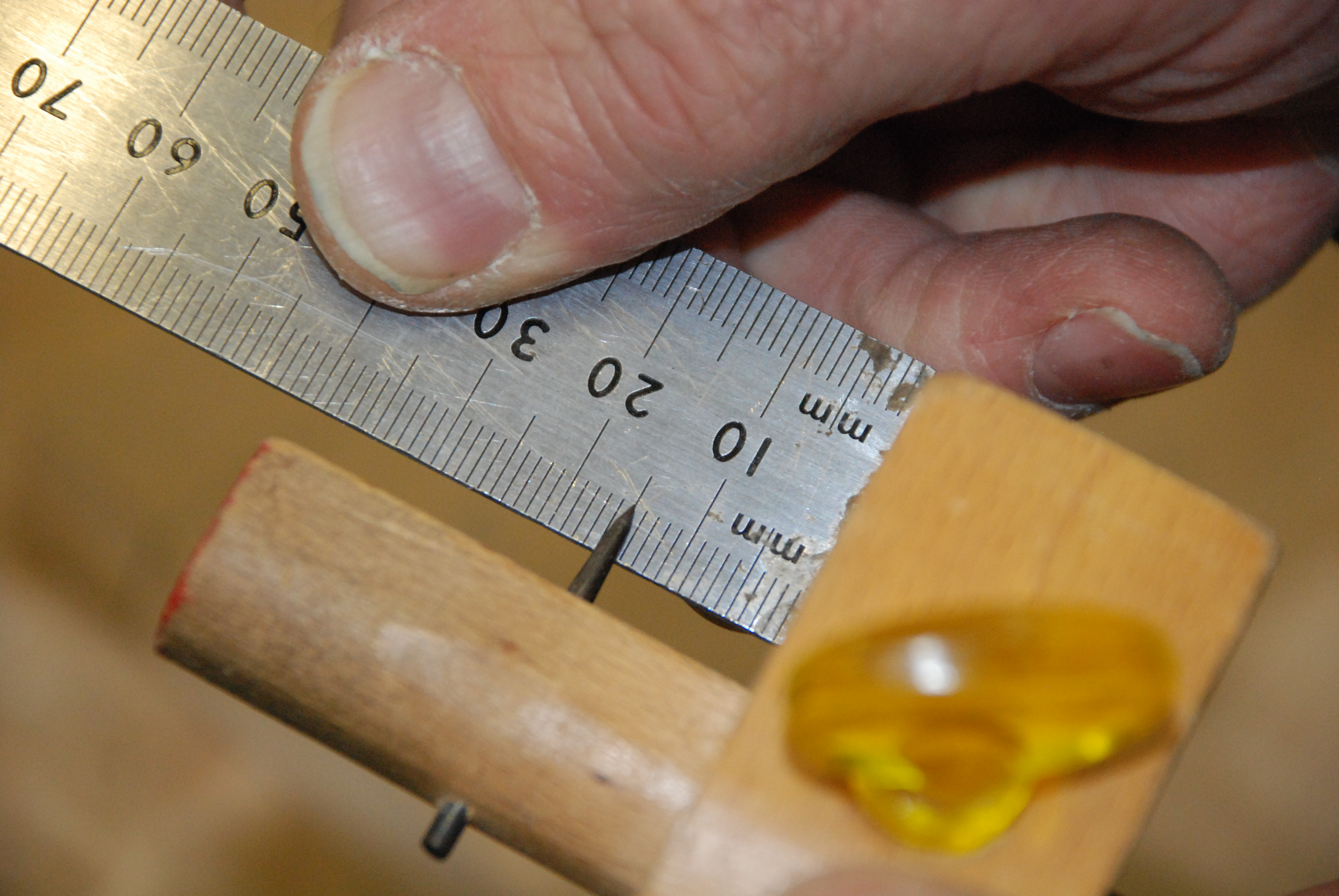
Setting a marking gauge to 15mm

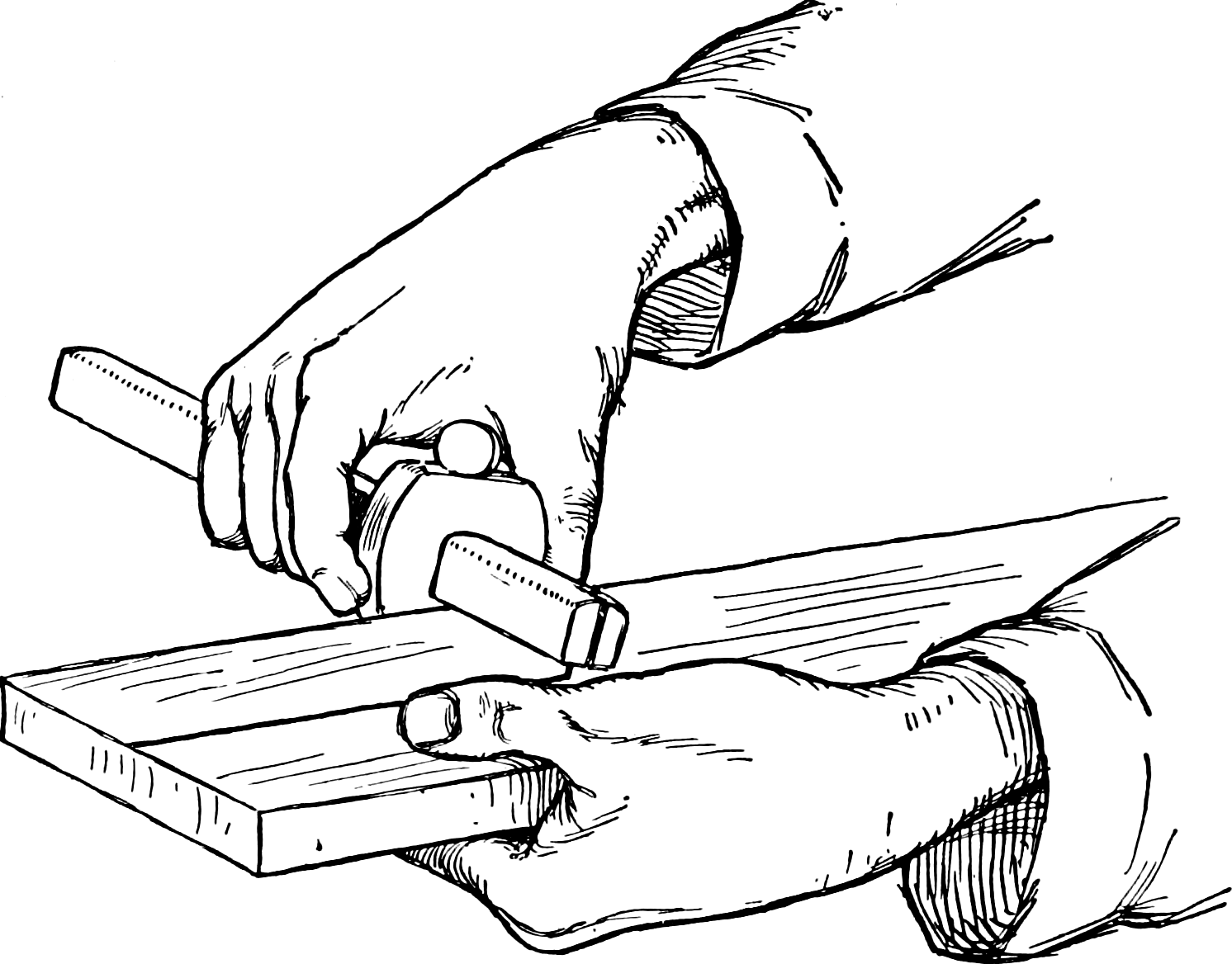
Illustration showing a marking gauge in use

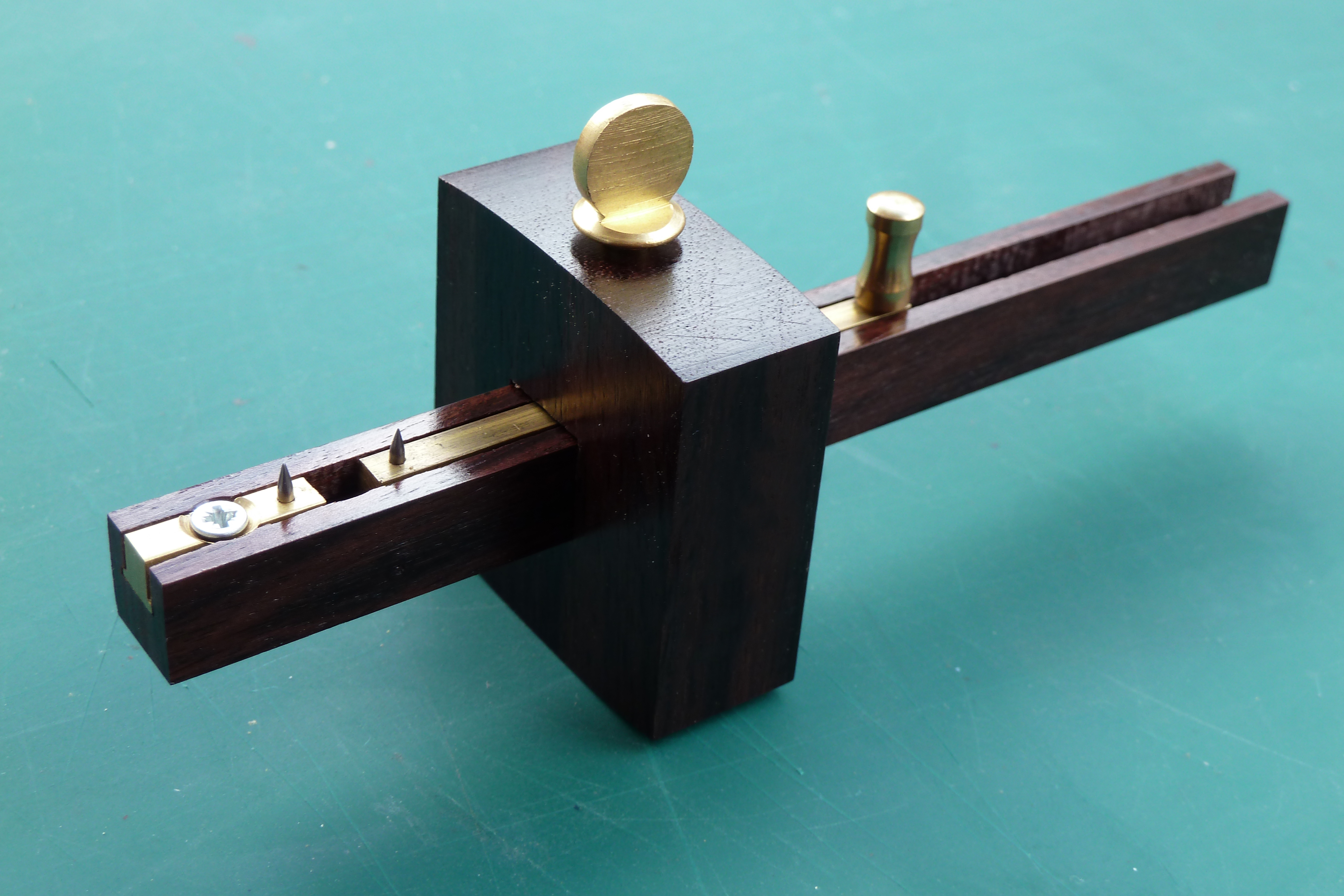
A mortise gauge

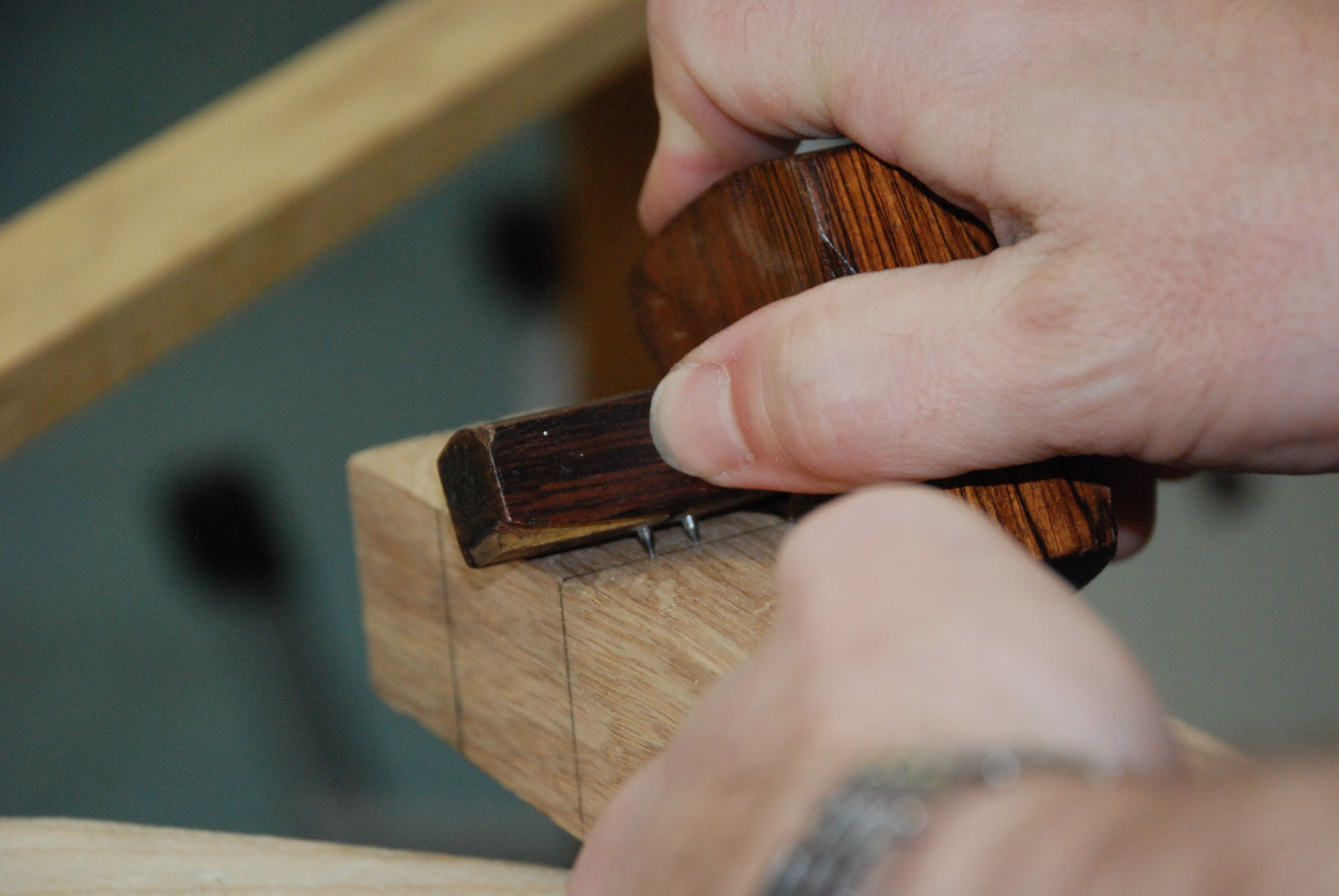
A mortise gauge being used

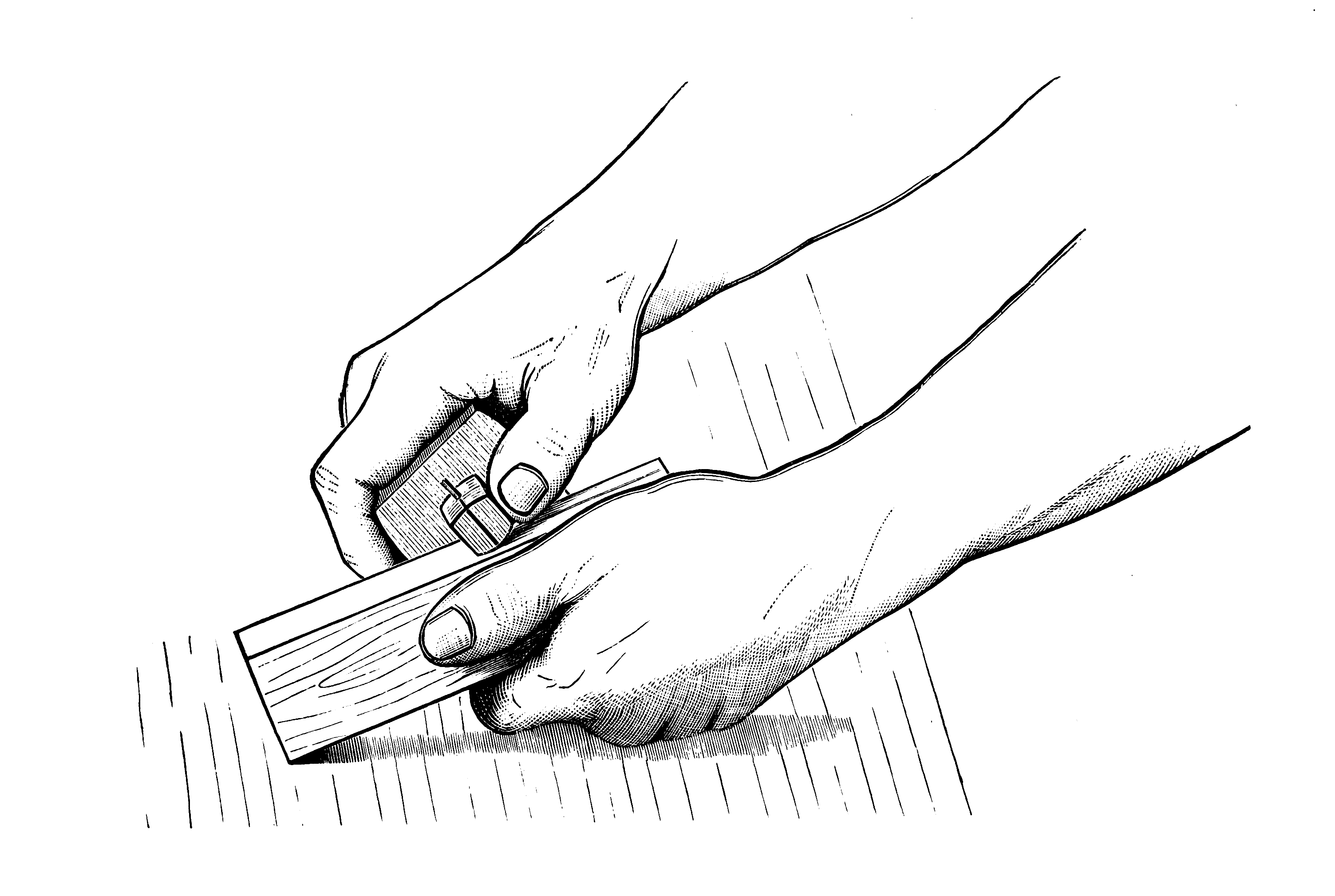
Illustration of a marking gauge in use

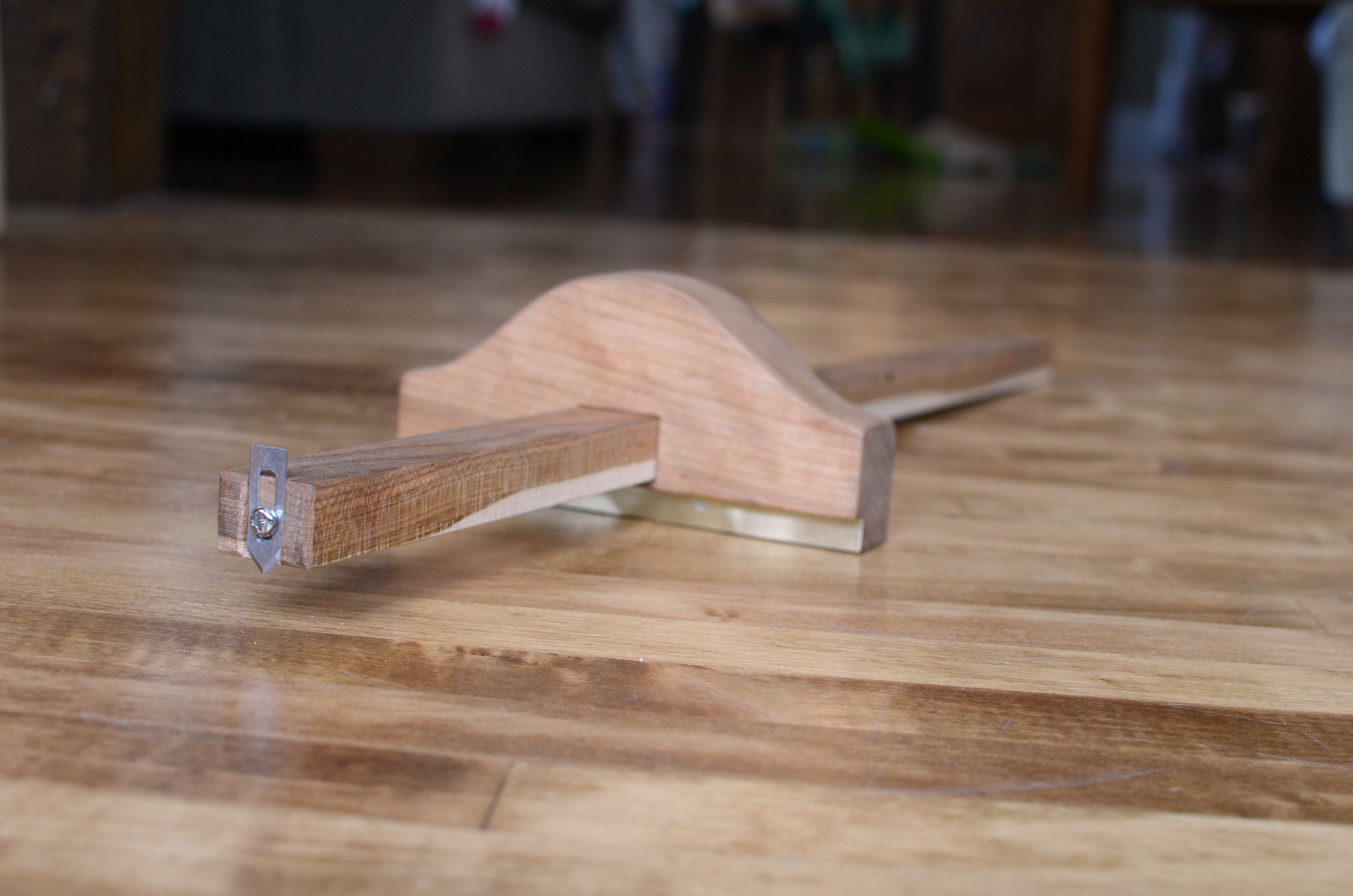
A panel gauge, used for marking wide boards and sheet materials.
