= Natural Habitat Conservation Areas in Japan =

Natural Habitat Conservation Areas (生息地等保護区, seisokuchi tō hogoku) or Natural Habitat Protection Areas in Japan are designated by the Ministry of the Environment to protect species of flora and fauna designated National Endangered Species, in accordance with the 1992 Act on Conservation of Endangered Species of Wild Fauna and Flora. Both managed protection zones and buffer monitoring zones are established.

== Designated Natural Habitat Conservation Areas ==
As of March 2018, nine Natural Habitat Conservation Areas have been designated.

Natural Habitat Conservation Area	Prefecture	Municipality	Area (ha) (managed)	First Established	Image	Coordinates
Handa Tokyo bitterling Natural Habitat Conservation Area 羽田ミヤコタナゴ生息地保護区; Handa miyako-tanago seisokuchi hogoku	Tochigi	Ōtawara	60.6 (12.8)	1994		36°54′39″N 140°04′53″E
Mount Kita Callianthemum hondoense Natural Habitat Conservation Area 北岳キタダケソウ生息地保護区; Kitadake kitadakesō seisokuchi hogoku	Yamanashi	Minami-Alps	38.5 (38.5)	1994		35°40′27″N 138°14′21″E
Zennōji Nagaoka Abe's salamander Natural Habitat Conservation Area 善王寺長岡アベサンショウウオ生息地保護区; Zennōji Nagaoka Abe sanshōuo seisokuchi hogoku	Kyōto	Kyōtango	13.1 (3.9)	2006		35°35′57″N 135°04′15″E
Ōoka Abe's salamander Natural Habitat Conservation Area 大岡アベサンショウウオ; Ōoka Abe sanshōuo seisokuchi hogoku	Hyōgo	Toyooka	3.1 (3.1)	1998		35°30′44″N 134°42′52″E
Yamasako Polemonium kiushianum Natural Habitat Conservation Area 山迫ハナシノブ生息地保護区; Yamasako hanashinobu seisokuchi hogoku	Kumamoto	Takamori	1.13 (1.13)	1996		32°48′N 131°06′E
Kitaobasama Polemonium kiushianum Natural Habitat Conservation Area 北伯母様ハナシノブ生息地保護区; Kitaobasama hanashinobu seisokuchi hogoku	Kumamoto	Takamori	7.05 (1.94)	1996		32°48′N 131°06′E
Imuta-ike Libellula angelina Natural Habitat Conservation Area 藺牟田池ベッコウトンボ生息地保護区; Imuta-ike bekkōtonbo seisokuchi hogoku	Kagoshima	Satsumasendai	153 (60)	1996		31°49′01″N 130°28′06″E
Mount Uegusuku Kikuzato's brook snake Natural Habitat Conservation Area 宇江城岳キクザトサワヘビ生息地保護区; Uegusuku-dake Kikuzato sawa-hebi seisokuchi hogoku	Okinawa	Kumejima	600 (255)	1998		26°22′37″N 126°46′12″E
Yonehara Platypleura albivannata Natural Habitat Conservation Area 米原イシガキニイニイ生息地保護区; Yonehara Ishigaki-niinii seisokuchi hogoku	Okinawa	Ishigaki	9.0 (9.0)	2003		24°30′N 124°15′E

== Complementary measures ==
Natural Habitat Conservation Areas are one element in a network of complementary protected area systems. Others include Wilderness Areas and Nature Conservation Areas under the Nature Conservation Law; Natural Parks under the Natural Parks Law; Wildlife Protection Areas under the Wildlife Protection and Hunting Law; Natural Monuments and Special Natural Monuments under the Law for the Protection of Cultural Properties 1950; Protected Forests under the National Forest Management Bylaw; and Protected Water Surfaces under the Preservation of Fisheries Resources Law. Areas are also protected in accordance with three international programmes: the World Heritage Convention (see Yakushima, Shirakami-Sanchi, Shiretoko, Ogasawara Islands, and Amami-Ōshima Island, Tokunoshima Island, northern part of Okinawa Island, and Iriomote Island); Man and the Biosphere Programme (see Mount Hakusan, Mount Ōdaigahara, Mount Ōmine, and Ōsugidani, Shiga Highland, Yakushima and Kuchinoerabu-jima, Aya, Minami-Alps, Tadami, Minakami, and Sobo, Katamuki, and Ōkue); and the Ramsar Convention (see Ramsar Sites in Japan).

== See also ==
- Wildlife of Japan
- National Parks of Japan
- Wildlife Protection Areas in Japan
- Environmental issues in Japan
