= Endangered Species (Japan) =

In the context of the conservation of endangered species in Japan, and the list below, Endangered Species (希少野生動植物種, Kishō yasei dōshokubutsu shu) are those designated by Cabinet order in accordance with the 1992 Act on Conservation of Endangered Species of Wild Fauna and Flora. There are two main types of Endangered Species, National Endangered Species (国内希少野生動植物種) (NES) and International Endangered Species (国際希少野生動植物種) (IES), although there is also provision for Temporarily Designated Endangered Species (緊急指定種), as well as Designated Nationally Endangered Species (特定国内希少野生動植物種)—and businesses dealing with Designated Nationally Endangered Species (特定国内種事業) and Designated Internationally Endangered Species (特定国際種事業).

== Definitions and provisions ==
- The conservation status of species, subspecies, and varieties of wild fauna and flora are to be monitored by the nation, which together with local public entities, is to formulate and implement measures for the conservation of endangered species, assisted by the contribution and cooperation of the public (Article 2)
- National Endangered Species, as designated by Cabinet order, are those that live or grow in Japan (Article 4)
- International Endangered Species, as designated by Cabinet order, and excluding National Endangered Species, are those for which arrangements have been made, aimed at their conservation, through international cooperation (Article 4)
- Temporarily Designated Endangered Species, with an Urgent Endangered Species Designation, are those, without protection as NES and IES, so designated, for a period of no more than three years, by the Minister of the Environment (Article 5)
- Designated Nationally Endangered Species, as designated by Cabinet order, are those that may be commercially bred or propagated and are not subject to arrangements, aimed at their conservation, through international cooperation (Article 4)
- No organism from a NES or Temporarily Designated Endangered Species may be captured, collected, killed, or harmed without a permit, specified commercial purpose, or other specified unavoidable grounds (Article 9–19)
- Those with legitimate title to organisms or body parts of IES shall arrange registration (Article 20–29)
- Where the Minister of the Environment deems it necessary for conservation of a NES, a Natural Habitat Protection Area may be designated, involving specification of the area (including managed, restricted, and monitoring zones), the NES, and related guidelines (Article 36–44)
- Programs for the rehabilitation of natural habitats and the maintenance of viable populations may be required (Article 45–48)

== National Endangered Species ==
As of 4 January 2021, 395 NES have been designated.

=== Birds ===
45 NES:

- Aleutian cackling goose, Branta hutchinsii leucopareia
- Tufted puffin, Fratercula cirrhata
- Uria aalge inornata
- Spoon-billed sandpiper, Eurynorhynchus pygmeus
- Amami woodcock, Scolopax mira
- Spotted greenshank, Tringa guttifer
- Oriental stork, Ciconia boyciana
- Crested ibis, Nipponia nippon
- Black-faced spoonbill, Platalea minor
- Chalcophaps indica yamashinai
- Columba janthina nitens
- Columba janthina stejnegeri
- Aquila chrysaetos japonica
- Buteo buteo toyoshimai
- Circus spilonotus spilonotus
- Haliaeetus albicilla albicilla
- Steller's sea eagle, Haliaeetus pelagicus
- Nisaetus nipalensis orientalis
- Spilornis cheela perplexus
- Falco peregrinus japonensis
- Lagopus muta japonica
- Red-crowned crane, Grus japonensis
- Emberiza aureola ornata
- Swinhoe's rail, Coturnicops exquisitus
- Okinawa rail, Gallirallus okinawae
- Chloris sinica kittlitzi
- Apalopteron familiare hahasima
- Lanius cristatus superciliosus
- Locustella pryeri pryeri
- Luscinia komadori komadori
- Luscinia komadori namiyei
- Izu thrush, Turdus celaenops
- Zoothera dauma major
- Fairy pitta, Pitta nympha
- Phalacrocorax urile, Phalacrocorax urile
- Schrenck's bittern, Ixobrychus eurhythmus
- Dendrocopos leucotos owstoni
- Picoides tridactylus inouyei
- Okinawa woodpecker, Sapheopipo noguchii
- Short-tailed albatross, Phoebastria albatrus
- Band-rumped storm petrel, Oceanodroma castro
- Bryan's shearwater, Puffinus bryani
- Puffinus lherminieri bannermani
- Bubo bubo borissowi
- Ketupa blakistoni blakistoni

=== Mammals ===
15 NES:

- Tsushima leopard cat [ja], Prionailurus bengalensis euptilurus
- Iriomote cat, Prionailurus bengalensis iriomotensis
- Daito flying fox, Pteropus dasymallus daitoensis
- Erabu flying fox, Pteropus dasymallus dasymallus
- Bonin flying fox, Pteropus pselaphon
- Orii's least horseshoe bat, Rhinolophus cornutus orii
- Okinawa little horseshoe bat, Rhinolophus pumilus pumilus
- Southeast Asian long-fingered bat, Miniopterus fuscus
- Ryukyu tube-nosed bat, Murina ryukyuana
- Yanbaru whiskered bat, Myotis yanbarensis
- Amami rabbit, Pentalagus furnessi
- Muennink's spiny rat, Tokudaia muenninki
- Ryukyu spiny rat, Tokudaia osimensis
- Tokunoshima spiny rat, Tokudaia tokunoshimensis
- Ryukyu long-tailed giant rat, Diplothrix legata

=== Reptiles ===
11 NES:

- Okinawa ground gecko, Goniurosaurus kuroiwae kuroiwae
- Spotted ground gecko, Goniurosaurus kuroiwae orientalis
- Sengoku ground gecko, Goniurosaurus kuroiwae sengokui
- Toyama's ground gecko, Goniurosaurus kuroiwae toyamai
- Yamashina's ground gecko, Goniurosaurus kuroiwae yamashinae
- Banded ground gecko, Goniurosaurus splendens
- Sakishima grass lizard, Takydromus dorsalis
- Miyako grass lizard, Takydromus toyamai
- Miyako keelback, Hebius concelarus
- Kikuzato's brook snake, Opisthotropis kikuzatoi
- Ryukyu black-breasted leaf turtle, Geoemyda japonica

=== Amphibians ===
14 NES:

- Holst's frog, Babina holsti
- Otton frog, Babina subaspera
- Namie's frog, Limnonectes namiyei
- Ishikawa's frog, Odorrana ishikawae
- Amami Ōshima frog, Odorrana splendida
- Utsunomiya's tip-nosed frog, Odorrana utsunomiyaorum
- Abe's salamander, Hynobius abei
- Amakusa salamander, Hynobius amakusaensis
- Ōsumi salamander, Hynobius osumiensis
- Sobo salamander, Hynobius shinichisatoi
- Tokyo salamander, Hynobius tokyoensis
- Tosashimizu salamander, Hynobius tosashimizuensis
- Tsukuba clawed salamander, Onychodactylus tsukubaensis
- Anderson's crocodile newt, Echinotriton andersoni

=== Fish ===
10 NES:

- Cobitis striata hakataensis
- Cobitis takenoi
- Ayumodoki, Parabotia curtus
- Deepbody bitterling, Acheilognathus longipinnis
- Acheilognathus tabira nakamurae
- Hemigrammocypris neglectus
- Rhodeus atremius suigensis
- Tokyo bitterling, Tanakia tanago
- Gymnogobius nakamurae
- Ariakehimeshirauo, Neosalanx reganius

=== Insects ===
52 NES:

- Tamamushia virida virida

=== Molluscs ===
48 NES

=== Crustaceans ===
6 NES:

- Paratya boninensis
- Paraleptuca boninensis
- Amamiku occulta
- Geothelphusa levicervix
- Geothelphusa miyakoensis
- Geothelphusa tenuimanus

=== Vascular plants ===
194 NES (including 63 Designated Nationally Endangered Species that are commercially propagated):

- Rhododendron amakusaense
- Rhododendron boninense
- Vaccinium amamianum
- Gentiana yakushimensis
- Deutzia yaeyamensis

== International Endangered Species ==
As of 1 July 2021, 217 birds have been designated IES in accordance with international migratory bird agreements, with other IES corresponding to those listed in the CITES Appendices.

== Temporarily Designated Endangered Species ==
As of 1 July 2021, three species are subject to Urgent Endangered Species Designation (until 30 June 2024):

- Scolopendra alcyona
- Eucorydia donanensis
- Eucorydia miyakoensis

== See also ==
- Japanese Red List
- Wildlife Protection Areas in Japan
- Protected Forests (Japan)
- Protected Water Surfaces (Japan)
