= Solanum miyakojimense =

Scientific classification
- Kingdom: Plantae
- Clade: Tracheophytes
- Clade: Angiosperms
- Clade: Eudicots
- Clade: Asterids
- Order: Solanales
- Family: Solanaceae
- Genus: Solanum
- Species: S. miyakojimense

Binomial name
- Solanum miyakojimense T.Yamaz. & A.Takushi

Species of tree

Solanum miyakojimense (イラブナスビ, Irabu-nasubi) is a species of flowering plant in the family Solanaceae that is native to the Miyako Islands of Japan and found also on Taiwan.

== Taxonomy ==
Upon its discovery in 1972, it was identified as Solanum indicum. It was subsequently identified as Solanum trilobatum. As an independent species, Solanum miyakojimense was first described by Japanese botanists Yamazaki Takashi and Takushi Anki in 1991. The specific epithet relates to the type locality on the island of Miyako-jima.

== Description ==
Solanum miyakojimense is a small evergreen shrub that grows to a height of some 30 centimetres (12 in). It has wide ovate leaves, 1–4 centimetres (0.39–1.57 in) in length, and purplish-white flowers. Its round berries, 8–10 millimetres (0.31–0.39 in) in diameter, turn an orangey red as they ripen.

== Distribution ==
Solanum miyakojimense grows amongst the rocks along the coast amidst vegetation dominated by Heliotropium arboreum and Scaevola taccada. At one time found around Cape Higashi-hennazaki on Miyako-jima, on Irabu Island, and on Kurima-jima, recent surveys have failed to confirm its presence in the Miyako Islands other than in two small areas in one part of Irabu, although it has also been reported from Taiwan.

== Conservation status ==
Solanum miyakojimense is classed as Critically Endangered on the Ministry of the Environment Red List and has been designated a National Endangered Species under the 1992 Act on Conservation of Endangered Species of Wild Fauna and Flora. The species has been designated a Municipal Natural Monument by Miyako City.
