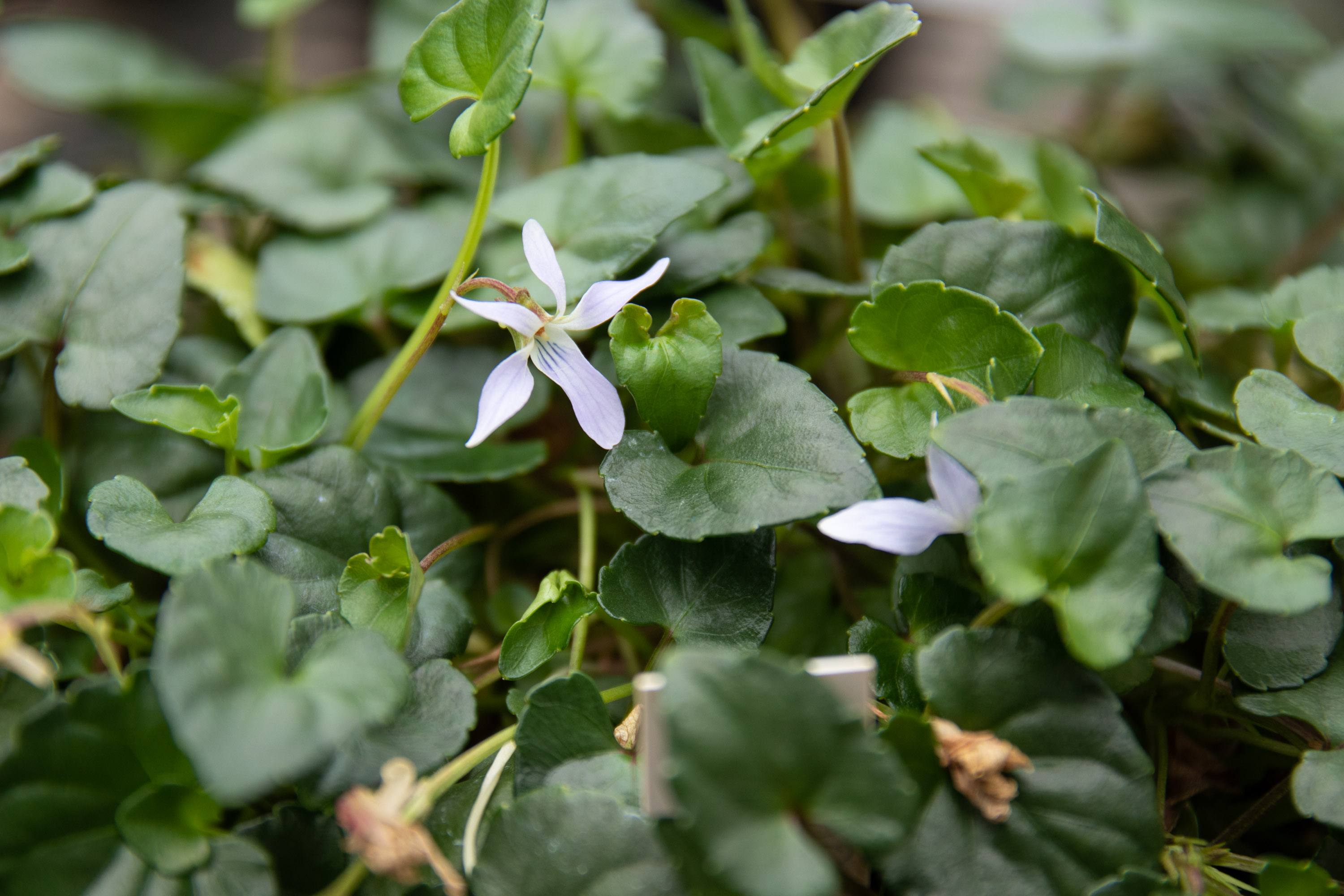

Conservation status
- Critically Endangered (IUCN 3.1)

Scientific classification
- Kingdom: Plantae
- Clade: Tracheophytes
- Clade: Angiosperms
- Clade: Eudicots
- Clade: Rosids
- Order: Malpighiales
- Family: Violaceae
- Genus: Viola
- Species: V. utchinensis

Binomial name
- Viola utchinensis Koidz.

= Viola utchinensis =

Species of plant

Viola utchinensis (オキナワスミレ, Okinawa sumire) is a species of flowering plant in the family Violaceae.

== Taxonomy ==
The species was first described by Japanese botanist Gen-ichi Koidzumi in 1938. The specific epithet relates to the type locality (Manzamo in the village of Onna) on Okinawa Island (Uchinā in Okinawan).

== Description ==
Viola utchinensis is an evergreen with ovate leaves and pale purple to purplish-white flowers. Flowers bloom from February to April.

== Distribution and habitat ==
Viola utchinensis is endemic to Okinawa Island in the Ryūkyū Islands of Japan.

This species can be found in crevices of raised coral reef and coastal cliffs. It grows in elevated habitat in full sun.

== Conservation status and threats ==
Viola utchinensis is classed as Critically Endangered on the IUCN Red List and Endangered on the Ministry of the Environment Red List and has been designated a National Endangered Species under the 1992 Act on Conservation of Endangered Species of Wild Fauna and Flora. In 2015 the population was estimated to be between 100 - 200 mature individuals.

V. utchinensis is threatened primarily by the illegal collection of specimens for cultivation. This is believed to be the biggest threat for the species. The species is attractive therefore is dug up to be used as rare ornamental plant.
