= Deutzia yaeyamensis =

Conservation status
- Endangered (IUCN 3.1)

Scientific classification
- Kingdom: Plantae
- Clade: Tracheophytes
- Clade: Angiosperms
- Clade: Eudicots
- Clade: Asterids
- Order: Cornales
- Family: Hydrangeaceae
- Genus: Deutzia
- Species: D. yaeyamensis

Binomial name
- Deutzia yaeyamensis Ohwi

Species of plant

Deutzia yaeyamensis (ヤエヤマヒメウツギ, Yaeyama hime-utsugi) is a species of flowering plant in the family Hydrangeaceae that is endemic to Iriomote in the Yaeyama Islands, Okinawa Prefecture, Japan.

== Taxonomy ==
The species was first described by Japanese botanist Jisaburō Ōi in 1938.

== Description ==
Deutzia yaeyamensis is a deciduous shrub that grows to a height of approximately 1 metre (3 ft 3 in), or to as high as 2 metres (6 ft 7 in). The oval to ovate leaves are finely serrated, while the ovoid winter buds open into clusters of some five to ten flowers, with white petals and dark yellow anthers.

== Distribution ==
Deutzia yaeyamensis is endemic to Iriomote in the Ryūkyū Islands, where it may be found growing in sunny spots on the cliffs that flank the island's rivers.

== Conservation status ==
Deutzia yaeyamensis is classed as Endangered on the IUCN Red List and Ministry of the Environment Red List. The species has been designated a National Endangered Species under the 1992 Act on Conservation of Endangered Species of Wild Fauna and Flora, and its collection and/or relocation are prohibited.
