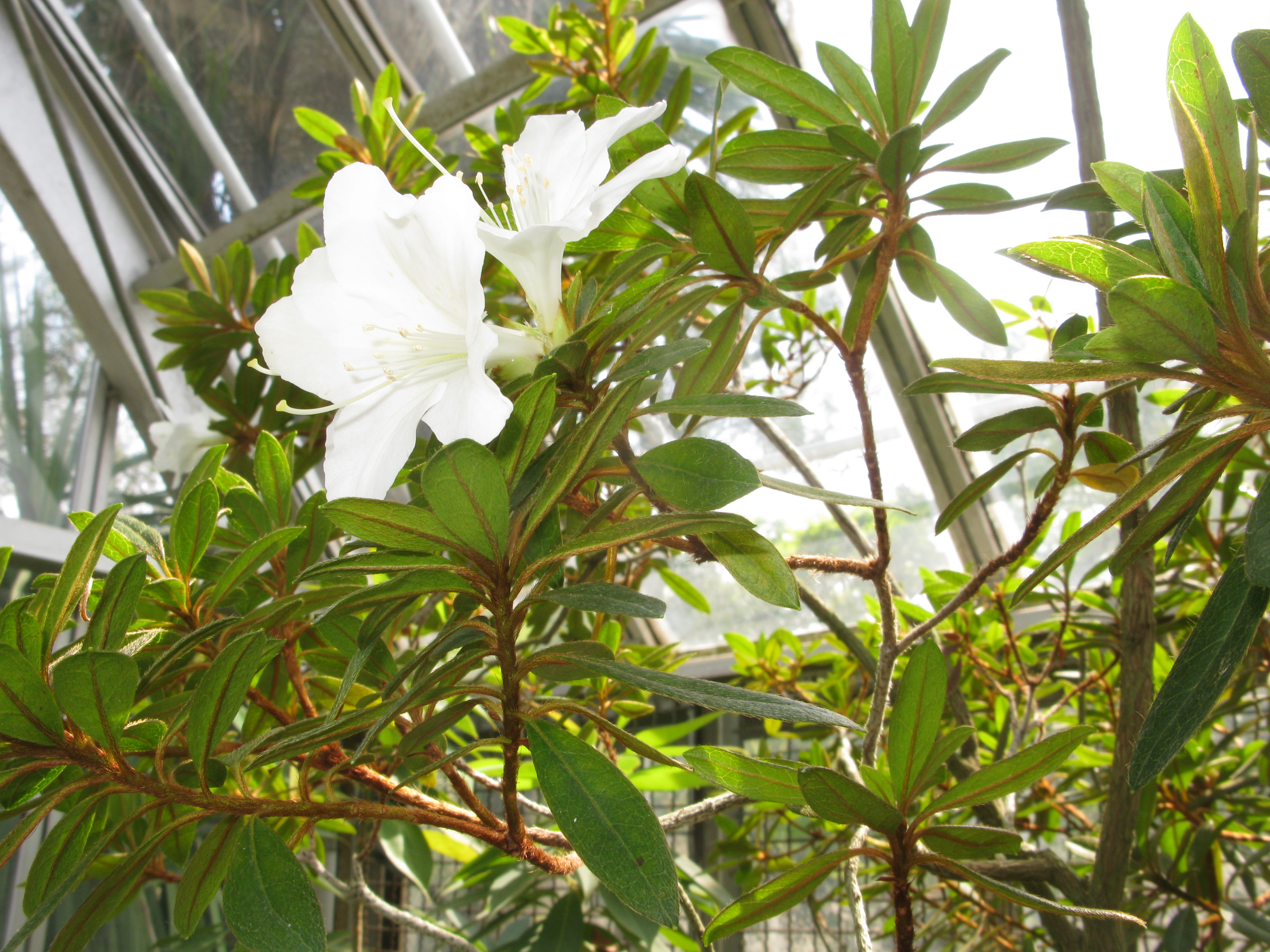

Scientific classification
- Kingdom: Plantae
- Clade: Tracheophytes
- Clade: Angiosperms
- Clade: Eudicots
- Clade: Asterids
- Order: Ericales
- Family: Ericaceae
- Genus: Rhododendron
- Species: R. boninense

Binomial name
- Rhododendron boninense Nakai

= Rhododendron boninense =

Species of plant

Rhododendron boninense (ムニンツツジ, Munin-tsutsuji) is a species of flowering plant in the family Ericaceae that is endemic to the Bonin Islands of Tōkyō Metropolis, Japan.

== Taxonomy ==
The species was first described by Japanese botanist Takenoshin Nakai in 1920. The specific epithet relates to the type locality in the Bonin (Munin) Islands.

== Description ==
Rhododendron boninense is an evergreen shrub that grows to a height of 2–3 metres (6 ft 7 in – 9 ft 10 in). Its white flowers bloom in and around April.

== Conservation status ==
Rhododendron boninense is classed as Critically Endangered on the Ministry of the Environment Red List and has been designated a National Endangered Species under the 1992 Act on Conservation of Endangered Species of Wild Fauna and Flora. According to the Red Data Book Tokyo, it is threatened by competition with exotic plants and browsing by introduced goats.

== See also ==
- Vaccinium boninense
