= Protected Forests (Japan) =

Areas of national forest in Japan

Protected Forests (保護林, Hogo-rin) are areas of national forest in Japan so designated in an effort to conserve biodiversity. Japan's Protected Forest system includes three categories of protected forests: Forest Biosphere Reserves; Biotic Community Protection Forests; and Rare Population Protection Forests. Some of these national forests are linked by a network of Green Corridors that are also included in the system. Established in 1915, the system was overhauled in 2015 and expanded in 2019.

== Background ==
Forests cover approximately two-thirds of Japan, extending over some 25,000,000 hectares (62,000,000 acres); of this, according to the Forestry Agency (林野庁), c.54% is classed as "natural forest", "planted forest" comprising most of the remainder. In terms of ownership, 58% of all forest is in private hands, state-owned "national forests" (ja) represent 30%, with the remaining 12% otherwise publicly owned, by prefectural and municipal governments, etc.

Forest conservation measures have a long history in the country: according to the Yōrō Code of 718, "the benefits of mountain, river, grove, and marsh are for government and people alike", with two clauses prohibiting cultivation in the mountains and encouraging the planting of trees along riverbanks and beside dams to counter erosion, while in Kasugayama Primeval Forest (春日山原始林) in Nara, tree-felling and hunting have been forbidden since 841.

Currently, forests are protected under a number of different systems and laws: as Natural Parks under the Natural Parks Act, Nature Conservation Areas under the Nature Conservation Act, Wildlife Protection Areas under the Wildlife Protection and Hunting Management Act, Natural Habitat Conservation Areas under the Conservation of Endangered Species of Wild Fauna and Flora Act, Special Seed Tree Forests (特別母樹林) under the Forestry Seeds and Seedlings Act (林業種苗法), Historic Sites, Places of Scenic Beauty, and Natural Monuments under the Law for the Protection of Cultural Properties—and as Protected Forests and Green Corridors.

Protected Forests date back to an ordinance of Taishō 4 (1915), with the first such forest established the following year, in Kamikōchi. By 1932, there were 93 Protected Forests covering a combined area of 110,000 hectares (270,000 acres). Demand for timber increased with post-war reconstruction, and the area protected had significantly decreased by the late 1950s and continued to fall through the 1960s. In 1972, the Forestry Agency issued a new Protected Forest management plan, and in 1973 the area under protection increased 150%. By 1988, there were 795 Protected Forests, covering an area of 166,800 hectares (412,000 acres). In 1991, the National Forest Regulations were completely overhauled, with a renewed focus on function and use rather than classification based on species—the four types identified were National Land Conservation Forest, Natural Maintenance Forest, Space Utilization Forest, and Wood Production Forest—and in 2001 the Forests and Forestry Basic Act (森林・林業基本法) was fully revised in line with international trends towards sustainability; the nation's basic forestry strategy and management plan are developed in accordance with this Act.

In 2015, a century after their institution, the Protected Forest system was revised, with the categories reduced from seven to three: (1) Forest Biosphere Reserve; (2) Biotic Community Protection Forest; and (3) Rare Population Protection Forest. (Note: Forest Biosphere Reserve (森林生態系保護地域) (sometimes alternatively rendered as Forest Ecosystem Reserve), Biotic Community Protection Forest (生物群集保護林), Rare Population Protection Forest (希少個体群保護林); the seven old categories were Forest Biosphere Reserve (森林生態系保護地域), Forest Biogenetic Resources Preservation Forest (森林生物遺伝資源保存林), Forest Tree Genetic Resources Preservation Forest (林木遺伝資源保存林), Plant Community Protection Forest (植物群落保護林), Specific Animal Habitat Protection Forest (特定動物生息地保護林), Specific Topography Protection Forest (特定地理等保護林), Hometown Forest (郷土の森)) As of 1 April 2018, there were in total 666 Protected Forests, covering an area of 977,000 hectares (2,410,000 acres), approximately 4% of the total forested area of the country, and 13% of that represented by national forest. As of 1 April 2019, a network of 24 Green Corridors, established to connect Protected Forests and facilitate interaction between discrete populations, represented a further 584,000 hectares (1,440,000 acres) of national forest.

== Protected Forests ==
=== Forest Biosphere Reserves ===
As of 1 April 2018, 31 Forest Biosphere Reserves (森林生態系保護地域) have been designated, covering an area of 701,000 hectares (1,730,000 acres). Of these, four are also inscribed on the UNESCO World Heritage List as Natural World Heritage Sites: Shiretoko, Shirakami-Sanchi, Ogaswara Islands, and Yakushima, while Amami Islands, Yanbaru, and Iriomote have been nominated for joint inscription and are currently on the Tentative List.

| Forest Biosphere Reserve | Designated Name | Prefecture | Area (km^{2}) | Image | Coordinates | Ref. |
|---|---|---|---|---|---|---|
| Shiretoko | 知床森林生態系保護地域 | Hokkaidō | 459.89 | | 44°20′09″N 145°19′49″E | |
| Kariba-sanchi Sukki River Source | 狩場山地須築川源流部森林生態系保護地域 | Hokkaidō | 27.32 | | 42°36′43″N 139°56′15″E | |
| Taisetsuzan | 大雪山森林生態系保護地域 | Hokkaidō | 961.97 | | 43°35′28″N 142°53′40″E | |
| Hidaka Mountains | 日高山脈森林生態系保護地域 | Hokkaidō | 1679.68 | | 42°43′10″N 142°40′58″E | |
| Izari-dake Environs | 漁岳周辺森林生態系保護地域 | Hokkaidō | 32.67 | | 42°49′24″N 141°13′41″E | |
| Shirakami-Sanchi | 白神山地森林生態系保護地域 | Aomori, Akita | 169.71 | | 40°30′13″N 140°01′07″E | |
| Osore-zan Mountains | 恐山山地森林生態系保護地域 | Aomori | 55.38 | | 41°18′29″N 141°05′15″E | |
| Mount Hayachine Environs | 早池峰山周辺森林生態系保護地域 | Iwate | 81.45 | | 39°33′30″N 141°29′16″E | |
| Kakkonda River–Tama River Source | 葛根田川・玉川源流部森林生態系保護地域 | Iwate | 93.91 | | 39°54′07″N 140°41′40″E | |
| Mount Kurikoma–Mount Tochigamori Environs | 栗駒山・栃ヶ森山周辺森林生態系保護地域 | Iwate, Miyagi, Akita | 163.34 | | 38°57′39″N 140°47′18″E | |
| Asahi Mountains | 朝日山地森林生態系保護地域 | Yamagata, Niigata | 605.22 | | 38°15′39″N 139°55′16″E | |
| Mount Iide Environs | 飯豊山周辺森林生態系保護地域 | Yamagata, Fukushima, Niigata | 294.45 | | 38°15′39″N 139°55′16″E | |
| Mount Azuma Environs | 吾妻山周辺森林生態系保護地域 | Fukushima | 81.98 | | 37°44′19″N 140°08′25″E | |
| Oku-Aizu | 奥会津森林生態系保護地域 | Fukushima | 839.92 | | 37°27′36″N 139°33′32″E | |
| Ogaswara Islands | 小笠原諸島森林生態系保護地域 | Tōkyō | 55.79 | | 26°40′26″N 142°09′13″E | |
| Tone River Source–Hiuchigatake Environs | 利根川源流部・燧ヶ岳周辺森林生態系保護地域 | Niigata, Gunma | 200.86 | | 36°58′15″N 139°02′36″E | |
| Mount Saburyū Environs | 佐武流山周辺森林生態系保護地域 | Niigata, Nagano | 127.92 | | 36°46′20″N 138°40′15″E | |
| Hakusan | 白山森林生態系保護地域 | Ishikawa, Gifu | 149.14 | | 36°09′50″N 136°46′22″E | |
| Northern Alps (Kanakido River–Takase River Source) | 北アルプス（金木戸川・高瀬川源流部）森林生態系保護地域 | Nagano, Gifu | 80.99 | | 36°26′46″N 137°44′01″E | |
| Central Alps Mount Kisokoma | 中央アルプス木曽駒ケ岳森林生態系保護地域 | Nagano | 18.13 | | 35°47′22″N 137°48′16″E | |
| Southern Minami-Alps Mount Tekari | 南アルプス南部光岳森林生態系保護地域 | Nagano, Shizuoka | 47.59 | | 35°20′17″N 138°05′02″E | |
| Ōsugidani | 大杉谷森林生態系保護地域 | Mie | 13.91 | | 34°12′40″N 136°09′03″E | |
| Daisen | 大山森林生態系保護地域 | Tottori | 31.90 | | 35°22′41″N 133°32′59″E | |
| Ishizuchi Mountains | 石鎚山系森林生態系保護地域 | Ehime | | | 33°46′06″N 133°06′51″E | |
| Mount Sobo–Mount Katamuki–Mount Ōkue Environs | 祖母山・傾山・大崩山周辺森林生態系保護地域 | Ōita, Miyazaki | 59.78 | | 32°49′40″N 131°20′50″E | |
| Aya | 綾森林生態系保護地域 | Miyazaki | 14.85 | | 32°01′47″N 131°10′17″E | |
| Mount Inao Environs | 稲尾岳周辺森林生態系保護地域 | Kagoshima | 10.45 | | 31°07′28″N 130°53′10″E | |
| Yakushima | 屋久島森林生態系保護地域 | Kagoshima | 151.85 | | 30°20′29″N 130°30′42″E | |
| Amami Islands | 奄美群島森林生態系保護地域 | Kagoshima | 48.20 | | 28°15′38″N 129°21′58″E | |
| Yanbaru | やんばる森林生態系保護地域 | Okinawa | 30.07 | | 26°38′15″N 128°08′02″E | |
| Iriomote | 西表島森林生態系保護地域 | Okinawa | 204.71 | | 24°19′48″N 123°49′19″E | |

=== Biotic Community Protection Forests ===
As of 1 April 2018, 95 Biotic Community Protection Forests (生物群集保護林) have been designated, covering an area of 236,000 hectares (580,000 acres).

| Biotic Community Protection Forest | Designated Name | Prefecture | Area (km^{2}) | Image | Coordinates | Ref. |
|---|---|---|---|---|---|---|
| Mount Muine Environs | 無意根山周辺生物群集保護林 | Hokkaidō | 20.47 | | 42°55′52″N 141°02′28″E | |
| Mount Yūbari | 夕張岳生物群集保護林 | Hokkaidō | 14.49 | | 43°06′00″N 142°15′04″E | |
| Shirikoma | 知駒生物群集保護林 | Hokkaidō | 12.33 | | 44°57′31″N 142°09′03″E | |
| Wakasakanai | 稚咲内生物群集保護林 | Hokkaidō | 20.18 | | 45°04′56″N 141°38′41″E | |
| Lake Kutcharo | クッチャロ湖生物群集保護林 | Hokkaidō | 3.84 | | 45°08′12″N 142°19′37″E | |
| Rishiri Island | 利尻島生物群集保護林 | Hokkaidō | 44.46 | | 45°11′11″N 141°14′27″E | |
| Rebun Island | 礼文島生物群集保護林 | Hokkaidō | 23.91 | | 45°23′43″N 140°59′14″E | |
| Taisetsu Primeval Forest | 大雪原生林生物群集保護林 | Hokkaidō | 5.27 | | 43°32′09″N 142°59′20″E | |
| Taisetsu Mountain Range Alpine Zone | 大雪山系高山帯生林生物群集保護林 | Hokkaidō | 13.40 | | 43°42′58″N 142°50′38″E | |
| Mount Shari | 斜里岳生林生物群集保護林 | Hokkaidō | 23.53 | | 43°45′49″N 144°42′53″E | |
| Mount Unabetsu | 海別岳生林生物群集保護林 | Hokkaidō | 26.96 | | 43°52′37″N 144°52′34″E | |
| Bekanbeushi | 別寒辺牛生林生物群集保護林 | Hokkaidō | 24.12 | | 43°06′08″N 144°50′54″E | |
| Mount Oakan | 雄阿寒岳生林生物群集保護林 | Hokkaidō | 37.59 | | 43°27′14″N 144°09′53″E | |
| Notsuke Peninsula | 野付半島生林生物群集保護林 | Hokkaidō | 3.01 | | 43°36′12″N 145°16′08″E | |
| Mount Obira | 大平山生林生物群集保護林 | Hokkaidō | 5.11 | | 42°38′14″N 140°08′10″E | |
| Mount Sengen | 千軒岳生林生物群集保護林 | Hokkaidō | 9.58 | | 41°34′45″N 140°09′39″E | |
| Uzura River | 鶉川生林生物群集保護林 | Hokkaidō | 5.11 | | 41°57′07″N 140°20′00″E | |
| Todo River | 椴川生林生物群集保護林 | Hokkaidō | 4.99 | | 41°48′13″N 140°09′05″E | |
| Okushiri Island | 奥尻島生物群集保護林 | Hokkaidō | 22.85 | | 42°09′25″N 139°27′24″E | |
| Hakkōda Mountains | 八甲田山生物群集保護林 | Aomori | 64.10 | | 40°39′53″N 140°54′44″E | |
| Hachimantai | 八幡平生物群集保護林 | Iwate, Akita | 102.35 | | 39°57′22″N 140°51′10″E | |
| Mount Goyō | 五葉山生物群集保護林 | Iwate | 102.35 | | 39°12′14″N 141°43′43″E | |
| Mount Waga | 和賀岳生物群集保護林 | Iwate, Akita | 89.55 | | 39°34′14″N 140°45′15″E | |
| Mount Yakeishi | 焼石岳生物群集保護林 | Iwate | 87.68 | | 39°09′49″N 140°49′41″E | |
| Busugamori | 毒ヶ森生物群集保護林 | Iwate | 16.39 | | 39°38′08″N 141°02′32″E | |
| Mount Funagata (Mount Goshō) | 船形山（御所山）生物群集保護林 | Miyagi, Yamagata | 71.51 | | 38°27′18″N 140°37′11″E | |
| Zaō | 蔵王生物群集保護林 | Miyagi, Yamagata | 66.21 | | 38°09′11″N 140°26′46″E | |
| Mount Taihei | 太平山生物群集保護林 | Akita | 72.23 | | 39°47′50″N 140°18′38″E | |
| Bandori Forest–Mount Daibutsu | 番鳥森・大仏岳生物群集保護林 | Akita | 12.39 | | 39°48′50″N 140°30′57″E | |
| Northwest Ōu Mountains | 奥羽山脈北西部生物群集保護林 | Akita | 11.91 | | 39°58′38″N 140°32′39″E | |
| Oga Peninsula Coastal Life | 男鹿半島海岸植生生物群集保護林 | Akita | 6.55 | | 39°57′10″N 139°43′38″E | |
| Budōmori | 葡萄森生物群集保護林 | Akita | 5.79 | | 39°52′00″N 140°36′44″E | |
| Mount Chōkai | 鳥海山生物群集保護林 | Akita, Yamagata | 72.41 | | 39°05′56″N 140°02′39″E | |
| Gassan | 月山生物群集保護林 | Yamagata | 68.22 | | 38°32′59″N 140°01′37″E | |
| Tsugamine–Mount Iimori | 栂峰・飯森山生物群集保護林 | Yamagata | 10.43 | | 37°49′42″N 139°56′14″E | |
| Kashi–Mount Futamata | 甲子・二岐山生物群集保護林 | Fukushima | 31.00 | | 37°14′47″N 139°58′02″E | |
| Abukuma Plateau | 阿武隈高地生物群集保護林 | Fukushima | 11.90 | | 37°17′N 140°43′E | |
| Oku-Kinu | 奥鬼怒生物群集保護林 | Tochigi | 25.85 | | 36°49′N 139°43′E | |
| Ōsabi Mountains | 大佐飛山地生物群集保護林 | Tochigi | 81.52 | | 37°03′49″N 139°50′40″E | |
| Shōjinsawa | 尚仁沢生物群集保護林 | Tochigi | 6.16 | | 36°51′35″N 139°49′13″E | |
| Ueno Narahara Fraxinus platypoda | 上野楢原のシオジ等生物群集保護林 | Gunma | 3.03 | | 36°04′N 138°42′E | |
| Chichibu Mountains | 秩父山地生物群集保護林 | Saitama | 21.45 | | 35°56′34″N 138°44′05″E | |
| Tanzawa Mountains | 丹沢山地生物群集保護林 | Kanagawa | 8.81 | | 35°29′N 139°06′E | |
| Komatsubara Wetlands | 小松原湿原生物群集保護林 | Niigata | 14.99 | | 36°53′09″N 138°40′34″E | |
| Mount Sumon | 守門岳生物群集保護林 | Niigata | 17.78 | | 37°23′52″N 139°08′11″E | |
| Echigo Mountains | 越後山脈生物群集保護林 | Niigata | 20.09 | | 37°31′17″N 139°25′33″E | |
| Kaya no Daira | カヤの平等等生物群集保護林 | Niigata | 14.00 | | 36°52′24″N 138°40′25″E | |
| Northern Alps (Mount Asahi–Hakuba Mountains) | 北アルプス（朝日・白馬連山）生物群集保護林 | Toyama, Nagano | 60.76 | | 36°49′36″N 137°43′48″E | |
| Northern Alps (Kurobe–Goryū–Harinoki–Shirasawa Tengu) | 北アルプス（黒部・五竜・針ノ木・白沢天狗）生物群集保護林 | Toyama, Nagano | 107.53 | | 36°32′17″N 137°41′03″E | |
| Sai River Source | 犀川源流生物群集保護林 | Ishikawa | 17.94 | | 36°29′15″N 136°43′22″E | |
| Senjōdaira | 千丈平生物群集保護林 | Ishikawa | 8.57 | | 36°18′30″N 136°46′55″E | |
| Mount Togakushi | 戸隠山生物群集保護林 | Nagano | 18.89 | | 36°46′12″N 138°03′17″E | |
| Mount Naeba Wetlands | 苗場山湿原生物群集保護林 | Nagano | 13.27 | | 36°50′45″N 138°41′21″E | |
| Mount Amakazari–Mount Tenguhara | 雨飾・天狗原山生物群集保護林 | Nagano | 15.65 | | 36°54′07″N 137°57′45″E | |
| Northern Alps (Mount Chō–Mount Otenshō–Mount Yari–Mount Hotakadake) | 北アルプス（蝶ヶ岳・大天井岳・槍ヶ岳・穂高岳）生物群集保護林 | Nagano | 71.61 | | 36°17′15″N 137°43′32″E | |
| Mount Washiba–Iō–Takase Valley | 鷲羽岳・硫黄・高瀬渓谷生物群集保護林 | Nagano | 25.50 | | 36°17′15″N 137°43′32″E | |
| Azusa River–Kasumizawa–Mount Yake | 梓川・霞沢・焼岳生物群集保護林 | Nagano | 25.72 | | 36°13′16″N 137°38′25″E | |
| Mount Kinpu | 金峰山生物群集保護林 | Nagano | 4.33 | | 35°52′19″N 138°37′31″E | |
| Mount Asama | 浅間山生物群集保護林 | Nagano | 19.20 | | 36°24′21″N 138°31′21″E | |
| Utsukushigahara | 美ヶ原生物群集保護林 | Nagano | 10.75 | | 36°13′33″N 138°06′27″E | |
| Yatsugatake | 八ヶ岳生物群集保護林 | Nagano | 5.16 | | 35°58′11″N 138°19′11″E | |
| Minami-Alps (Mount Senjō etc) | 南アルプス（仙丈ヶ岳等）生物群集保護林 | Nagano | 32.28 | | 35°43′12″N 138°11′01″E | |
| Minami-Alps (Shiomi etc) | 南アルプス（塩見等）生物群集保護林 | Nagano | 52.06 | | 35°34′26″N 138°10′59″E | |
| Minami-Alps (Mount Hijiri etc) | 南アルプス（聖岳等）生物群集保護林 | Nagano | 50.05 | | 35°25′21″N 138°08′23″E | |
| Mount Nagiso | 南木曽岳生物群集保護林 | Nagano | 6.73 | | 35°35′31″N 137°38′36″E | |
| Mount Norikura | 乗鞍岳生物群集保護林 | Nagano, Gifu | 57.40 | | 36°06′59″N 137°32′09″E | |
| Kiso | 木曽生物群集保護林 | Nagano, Gifu | 103.92 | | 35°53′26″N 137°39′33″E | |
| Ontake | 御岳生物群集保護林 | Nagano, Gifu | 31.22 | | 35°52′56″N 137°26′55″E | |
| Shizumo | 賤母生物群集保護林 | Nagano, Gifu | 2.51 | | 35°34′40″N 137°34′08″E | |
| Mount Sanshū Fagus crenata | 三周ヶ岳ブナ生物群集保護林 | Gifu | 11.30 | | 35°41′02″N 136°18′01″E | |
| Mount Nōgōhaku Fagus crenata | 能郷白山ブナ生物群集保護林 | Gifu | 6.50 | | 35°45′45″N 136°30′50″E | |
| Mount Ena | 恵那山生物群集保護林 | Gifu | 4.92 | | 35°26′36″N 137°35′50″E | |
| Mount Ashitaka | 愛鷹山生物群集保護林 | Shizuoka | 5.70 | | 35°14′19″N 138°47′33″E | |
| Mount Fuji | 富士山生物群集保護林 | Shizuoka | 10.27 | | 35°21′33″N 138°43′35″E | |
| Hatchō Pond–Kawakodaira | 八丁池・皮子平生物群集保護林 | Shizuoka | 6.37 | | 34°50′46″N 138°57′41″E | |
| Mount Kamitani | 上谷山生物群集保護林 | Shiga | 5.74 | | 35°40′26″N 136°14′40″E | |
| Mount Hyōno-Sannomaru | 氷ノ山・三の丸生物群集保護林 | Hyōgo | 3.85 | | 35°21′14″N 134°30′50″E | |
| Ikegō | 池郷生物群集保護林 | Nara | 7.03 | | 34°03′N 135°58′E | |
| Mount Narukawa | 鳴川山生物群集保護林 | Nara | 3.46 | | 34°39′22″N 135°40′54″E | |
| Kurozō Valley | 黒蔵谷生物群集保護林 | Wakayama | 5.16 | | 33°46′N 135°41′E | |
| Mount Mikuni | 三国山生物群集保護林 | Tottori | 3.19 | | 35°03′28″N 133°16′09″E | |
| Mount Tsurugi | 剣山生物群集保護林 | Tokushima | | | 33°51′14″N 134°05′39″E | |
| Mount Nishikuma | 西熊山生物群集保護林 | Tokushima | | | 33°50′27″N 133°59′25″E | |
| Mount Ishidate | 石立山生物群集保護林 | Tokushima | | | 33°47′06″N 134°03′18″E | |
| Mount Takatori | 鷹取山生物群集保護林 | Kōchi | | | 33°18′55″N 132°58′01″E | |
| Fugen-dake | 普賢岳生物群集保護林 | Nagasaki | 4.43 | | 32°45′36″N 130°17′32″E | |
| Danjo Islands | 男女群島生物群集保護林 | Nagasaki | 4.15 | | 32°01′26″N 128°23′07″E | |
| Kyūshū Chūō Sanchi | 九州中央山地生物群集保護林 | Kumamoto, Miyazaki | 60.38 | | 32°21′52″N 131°00′53″E | |
| Mount Shiraga | 白髪岳生物群集保護林 | Kumamoto | 3.79 | | 32°09′03″N 130°56′36″E | |
| Mount Oninome | 鬼の目山生物群集保護林 | Miyazaki | 4.67 | | 32°42′09″N 131°31′42″E | |
| Mount Kamon | 掃部岳生物群集保護林 | Miyazaki | 6.27 | | 32°08′02″N 131°11′33″E | |
| Mount Ōmori | 大森岳生物群集保護林 | Miyazaki | 3.73 | | 32°04′33″N 131°09′18″E | |
| Inohae Evergreen Forest | 猪八重照葉樹林生物群集保護林 | Miyazaki | 4.81 | | 31°43′43″N 131°22′00″E | |
| Mount Kirishima | 霧島山生物群集保護林 | Miyazaki, Kagoshima | 63.54 | | 31°55′45″N 130°55′35″E | |
| Mount Takakuma | 高隈山生物群集保護林 | Kagoshima | 11.76 | | 31°28′20″N 130°48′06″E | |

=== Rare Population Protection Forests ===
As of 1 April 2018, 540 Rare Population Protection Forests (希少個体群保護林) have been designated, covering an area of 40,000 hectares (99,000 acres).

== Green Corridors ==
As of 1 April 2019, 24 Green Corridors (緑の回廊) have been designated, covering an area of 584,000 hectares (1,440,000 acres).

| Green Corridor | Designated Name | Prefecture | Area (km^{2}) | Length (km) | Image | Coordinates | Ref. |
|---|---|---|---|---|---|---|---|
| Shiretoko Peninsula | 知床半島緑の回廊 | Hokkaidō | 120 | 36 | | 43°53′N 145°01′E | |
| Taisetsu–Hidaka | 大雪・日高緑の回廊 | Hokkaidō | 170 | 57 | | 43°13′N 142°47′E | |
| Shikotsu–Muine | 支笏・無意根緑の回廊 | Hokkaidō | 70 | 30 | | 42°49′N 141°12′E | |
| Shirakami–Hakkōda | 白神八甲田緑の回廊 | Aomori | 220 | 50 | | 40°31′N 140°02′E | |
| Ōu Mountains | 奥羽山脈緑の回廊 | Aomori, Iwate, Miyagi, Akita, Yamagata | 730 | 400 | | 39°44′N 140°43′E | |
| Kitakami Plateau | 北上高地緑の回廊 | Iwate | 260 | 150 | | 39°13′N 141°42′E | |
| Chōkai-Asahi–Iide-Azuma | 鳥海朝日・飯豊吾妻緑の回廊 | Miyagi, Akita, Yamagata, Fukushima, Niigata | 590 | 260 | | 38°58′N 140°46′E | |
| Hachimantai–Mount Taihei | 八幡平太平山緑の回廊 | Akita | 110 | 60 | | 39°57′N 140°41′E | |
| Aizu Mountains | 会津山地緑の回廊 | Fukushima | 1058 | 100 | | 37°23′N 139°18′E | |
| Nikkō–Mount Azuma | 日光・吾妻山地緑の回廊 | Fukushima, Tochigi | 939 | 180 | | 37°41′N 140°11′E | |
| Echigo Line | 緑の回廊越後線 | Fukushima, Niigata | 161 | 76 | | 37°25′N 139°11′E | |
| Nikkō Line | 緑の回廊日光線 | Tochigi | 114 | 41 | | 36°47′N 139°21′E | |
| Mikuni Line | 緑の回廊三国線 | Gunma, Niigata, Nagano | 131 | 56 | | 36°52′N 138°42′E | |
| Chichibu Mountains | 秩父山地緑の回廊 | Saitama | 65 | 44 | | 35°59′N 138°47′E | |
| Mount Tanzawa | 丹沢緑の回廊 | Kanagawa | 36 | 40 | | 35°28′N 139°10′E | |
| Hakusan Mountains | 白山山系緑の回廊 | Toyama, Ishikawa, Fukui, Gifu | 430 | 70 | | 36°10′N 136°44′E | |
| Etsumi Mountains | 越美山地緑の回廊 | Fukui, Gifu, Shiga | 240 | 66 | | 35°46′N 136°31′E | |
| Fuji-san | 富士山緑の回廊 | Yamanashi | 21 | 24 | | 35°22′N 138°44′E | |
| Yatsugatake | 緑の回廊八ヶ岳 | Yamanashi, Nagano | 60 | 21 | | 35°14′N 137°39′E | |
| Amakazari–Togakushi | 緑の回廊雨飾・戸隠 | Nagano | 40 | 17 | | 36°47′N 138°02′E | |
| Eastern Chūgoku Mountains | 東中国山地緑の回廊 | Hyōgo, Tottori, Okayama | 60 | 42 | | 35°26′N 134°26′E | |
| Shikoku Mountains | 四国山地緑の回廊 | Ehime, Kōchi | 170 | 137 | | 33°46′N 133°10′E | |
| Aya River Upper Stretches | 綾川上流緑の回廊 | Miyazaki | 20 | 5 | | 32°01′N 131°14′E | |
| Ōsumi Peninsula | 大隅半島緑の回廊 | Kagoshima | 10 | 22 | | 31°08′N 130°55′E | |

== See also ==
- Ministry of Agriculture, Forestry and Fisheries (Japan)
- 100 Terraced Rice Fields of Japan
- Flora of Japan
