= Act on Conservation of Endangered Species of Wild Fauna and Flora (Japan) =

Japanese law

Act on Conservation of Endangered Species of Wild Fauna and Flora 絶滅のおそれのある野生動植物の種の保存に関する法律

Diet of Japan
- Enacted: 5 June 1992 (Act No. 75)
- Effective: 1 April 1993
- Status: In force

The Act on Conservation of Endangered Species of Wild Fauna and Flora (絶滅のおそれのある野生動植物の種の保存に関する法律, Zetsumetsu no osore no aru yasei dōshokubutsu no shu no hozon ni kansuru hōritsu) is a Japanese law on nature conservation intended to protect rare species and ecosystems. The law was passed in 1992 and entered into force the following year.

The Act provides the legal framework for the domestic designation of Endangered Species and Natural Habitat Conservation Areas as well as for the honouring of international commitments under the Washington Convention (CITES) and conventions and agreements [ja] on migratory birds, including the 1972 Japan-U.S Migratory Birds Convention, 1973 Japan-Russia Migratory Birds Convention, and 1974 Japan–Australia Migratory Bird Agreement.

== Legislation repealed ==
The Act supersedes and repeals the 1972 Act on Regulation of Transfers, etc. of Special Birds (特殊鳥類の譲渡等の規制に関する法律) (Act No. 49) and 1987 Act on Regulation, etc. of Transfers of Endangered Wild Fauna and Flora (絶滅のおそれのある野生動植物の譲渡の規制等に関する法律) (Act No. 58).

== Contents ==
The Act has six chapters and sixty-six articles, as well as a number of supplementary provisions:

Chapter I — General Provisions (Articles 1–6)
Chapter II — Treatment of Individual Organisms (Articles 7–33)
Chapter III — Habitat Protection (Articles 34–44)
Chapter IV — Rehabilitation of Natural Habitat, Maintenance of Viable Populations (Articles 45–48)
Chapter V — Miscellaneous Provisions (Articles 49–57)
Chapter VI — Penal Provisions (Articles 58–66)
Supplementary Provisions

== See also ==
- Nature Conservation Law (Wilderness Areas, Nature Conservation Areas)
- Natural Parks Law (Natural Parks, including National Parks)
- Wildlife Protection and Hunting Law (Wildlife Protection Areas)
- Law for the Protection of Cultural Properties (Natural Monuments)
- Protected Forests, Protected Water Surfaces
- Japanese Red List
