= Wildlife Protection Areas in Japan =

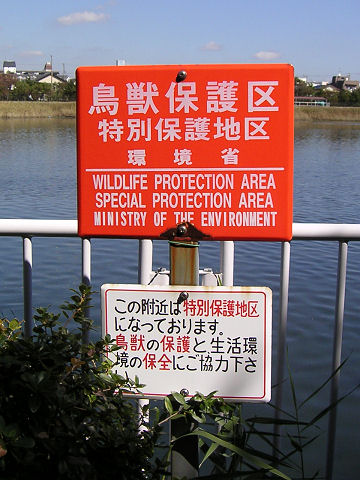
Notification of a Wildlife Protection Area and Special Protection Area in Yatsu-higata, a tidal flat and Ramsar Site in Tokyo Bay

Wildlife Protection Areas (鳥獣保護区, chōjū hogoku) in Japan are established by the Ministry of the Environment and, for areas of more local importance, by the Prefectural Governments in order "to protect and promote the reproduction of birds and mammals" in accordance with the 2002 Wildlife Protection and Hunting Law (鳥獣の保護及び狩猟の適正化に関する法律) (superseding the amended 1918 Law). The areas established have a maximum duration of twenty years (subject to renewal) and hunting is prohibited within them. Special Protection Areas (特別保護地区) are designated within the Wildlife Protection Areas in order to protect habitats and ecosystems.

== Classification of wildlife ==
The wildlife of Japan is classified either as game species or protected species. The former includes thirty species of bird and seventeen of mammal that are considered (1) able to withstand hunting (2) harmful to agriculture and forestry (3) useful for meat or other derivatives. These species include the brown bear, black bear, Japanese deer, Japanese hare, Japanese quail, and Japanese pheasant. Over six hundred species are protected. Insectivorous mammals and rats are excluded from protection since they are considered harmful to agriculture; some marine mammals fall under the alternative jurisdiction of the Ministry of Agriculture, Forestry and Fisheries. While the number of animals hunted is falling with the decline in the number of hunters, the number of birds and mammals "controlled" is rising in relation to damage to crops.

== Established Wildlife Protection Areas ==
As of 1 November 2019, eighty-six Wildlife Protection Areas have been established at a national level, covering an area of 5,930 square kilometres (2,290 sq mi), including 1,639 square kilometres (633 sq mi) of Special Protection Areas. As of the same date, 3,639 Wildlife Protection Areas have been established at a prefectural level, covering an area of 29,260 square kilometres (11,300 sq mi), including 1,425 square kilometres (550 sq mi) of prefectural Special Protectional Areas. The eighty-six nationally designated areas, divided into the four classes of large habitats (大規模生息地), wetland areas (集団渡来地), breeding areas (集団繁殖地), and habitats of rare birds and mammals (希少鳥獣生息地), are as follows:

Wildlife Protection Area	Designated Name	Image	Prefecture	Coordinates	Area (km^{2})	Established	Class
Daisetsuzan	大雪山鳥獣保護区		Hokkaido	43°39′08″N 142°54′09″E	355.34	1992	1
Towada	十和田鳥獣保護区		Aomori, Akita	40°27′52″N 140°52′40″E	376.74	1953	1
Shirakami-Sanchi	白神山地鳥獣保護区		Aomori, Akita	40°28′09″N 140°07′50″E	171.57	2004	1
Asama	浅間鳥獣保護区		Gunma, Nagano	36°24′19″N 138°31′20″E	309.40	1951	1
Hakusan	白山鳥獣保護区		Ishikawa, Gifu	36°09′19″N 136°45′41″E	380.61	1969	1
Ōdai Mountains	大台山系鳥獣保護区		Mie, Nara	34°10′59″N 136°05′01″E	185.72	1972	1
Tsurugi Mountains	剣山山系鳥獣保護区		Tokushima, Kōchi	33°51′14″N 134°05′41″E	118.17	1988	1
Daisen	大山鳥獣保護区		Tottori	35°22′34″N 133°32′40″E	51.56	1958	1
Ishizuchi Mountains	石鎚山系鳥獣保護区		Ehime, Kōchi	33°46′18″N 133°06′43″E	108.58	1977	1
Kirishima	霧島鳥獣保護区		Miyazaki, Kagoshima	31°55′00″N 130°52′48″E	114.33	1978	1
Hamatonbetsu Lake Kutcharo	浜頓別クッチャロ湖鳥獣保護区		Hokkaidō	45°08′01″N 142°19′43″E	28.03	1983	2
Sarobetsu	サロベツ鳥獣保護区		Hokkaidō	45°06′20″N 141°41′07″E	37.39	1992	2
Lake Tōfutsu	濤沸湖鳥獣保護区		Hokkaidō	43°55′04″N 144°26′15″E	20.23	1992	2
Notsuke Peninsula - Notsuke Bay	野付半島・野付湾鳥獣保護区		Hokkaidō	43°37′29″N 145°12′41″E	61.46	2005	2
Lake Furen	風蓮湖鳥獣保護区		Hokkaidō	43°20′21″N 145°16′00″E	81.39	1993	2
Akkeshi-Bekanbeushi-Kiritappu	厚岸・別寒辺牛・霧多布鳥獣保護区		Hokkaidō	43°05′01″N 145°04′48″E	130.64	1993	2
Miyajima-numa	宮島沼鳥獣保護区		Hokkaidō	43°19′57″N 141°42′49″E	0.41	1992	2
Lake Utonai	ウトナイ湖鳥獣保護区		Hokkaidō	42°41′57″N 141°42′43″E	5.10	1982	2
Kominato	小湊鳥獣保護区		Aomori	40°56′14″N 140°58′23″E	45.18	1971	2
Izu-numa	伊豆沼鳥獣保護区		Miyagi	38°42′55″N 141°06′14″E	14.55	1982	2
Sendai Seaside	仙台海浜鳥獣保護区		Miyagi	38°12′28″N 140°58′48″E	75.96	1987	2
Kabukuri-numa and the surrounding rice paddies	蕪栗沼・周辺水田鳥獣保護区		Miyagi	38°38′13″N 141°06′18″E	30.61	2005	2
Kejo-numa	化女沼鳥獣保護区		Miyagi	38°37′50″N 140°57′46″E	0.78	2008	2
Mogami River Mouth	最上川河口鳥獣保護区		Yamagata	38°55′23″N 139°48′40″E	15.37	2005	2
Ōyama Kamiike-Shimoike	大山上池・下池鳥獣保護区		Yamagata	38°45′00″N 139°45′20″E	0.39	2008	2
Fukushimagata	福島潟鳥獣保護区		Niigata	37°54′39″N 139°15′06″E	2.31	1974	2
Lake Hyōko	瓢湖鳥獣保護区		Niigata	37°50′19″N 139°14′15″E	2.81	2005	2
Sakata Lagoon	佐潟鳥獣保護区		Niigata	37°48′58″N 138°52′27″E	2.51	1981	2
Hinuma	涸沼鳥獣保護区		Ibaraki	36°16′30″N 140°30′18″E	20.72	2014	2
Watarase Reservoir	渡良瀬遊水地鳥獣保護区		Ibaraki, Tochigi, Gunma, Saitama	36°14′20″N 139°42′00″E	28.61	2012	2
Kasaioki-Sanmaisu	葛西沖三枚洲鳥獣保護区		Tokyo	35°38′01″N 139°51′48″E	3.80	2018	2
Yatsu	谷津鳥獣保護区		Chiba	35°40′39″N 140°00′28″E	0.41	1988	2
Katano Kamoike	片野鴨池鳥獣保護区		Ishikawa	36°19′18″N 136°17′39″E	0.10	1993	2
Fujimae-higata	藤前干潟鳥獣保護区		Aichi	35°04′54″N 136°50′15″E	7.70	2002	2
Hamakōshien	浜甲子園鳥獣保護区		Hyōgo	34°42′54″N 135°21′03″E	0.30	1978	2
Nakaumi	中海鳥獣保護区		Tottori, Shimane	35°28′01″N 133°11′39″E	86.82	1974	2
Lake Shinji	宍道湖鳥獣保護区		Shimane	35°27′48″N 133°02′59″E	78.99	2005	2
Wajiro-higata - Tatara River Mouth	和白干潟・多々良川河口鳥獣保護区		Fukuoka	33°41′12″N 130°25′46″E	2.91	2003	2
Higashiyoka-higata	東よか干潟鳥獣保護区		Saga	33°10′25″N 130°16′13″E	2.39	2015	2
Hizen Kashima-higata	肥前鹿島干潟鳥獣保護区		Saga	33°06′32″N 130°07′41″E	0.67	2015	2
Arao-higata	荒尾干潟鳥獣保護区		Kumamoto	32°59′11″N 130°25′45″E	18.23	2012	2
Izumi-Takaono	出水・高尾野鳥獣保護区		Kagoshima	32°06′12″N 130°16′27″E	8.42	1987	2
Yagaji	屋我地鳥獣保護区		Okinawa	26°38′54″N 128°01′59″E	32.17	1976	2
Lake Man	漫湖鳥獣保護区		Okinawa	43°55′04″N 144°26′15″E	1.74	1977	2
Yonaha Bay	与那覇湾鳥獣保護区		Okinawa	24°45′34″N 125°15′47″E	13.66	2011	2
Ikema	池間鳥獣保護区		Okinawa	24°55′56″N 125°14′31″E	2.82	2011	2
Teuri Island	天売島鳥獣保護区		Hokkaidō	44°25′18″N 141°18′32″E	5.51	1982	3
Yururi - Moyururi	ユルリ・モユルリ鳥獣保護区		Hokkaidō	43°13′37″N 145°36′27″E	1.99	1982	3
Daikoku Island	大黒島鳥獣保護区		Hokkaidō	42°57′17″N 144°52′24″E	1.07	1972	3
Hide Island	日出島鳥獣保護区		Iwate	39°41′14″N 141°59′16″E	0.08	1982	3
Sangan Island	三貫島鳥獣保護区		Iwate	39°18′21″N 141°58′57″E	0.25	1981	3
Tadanae-jima	祗苗島鳥獣保護区		Tokyo	34°12′28″N 139°11′30″E	5.93	2010	3
Ōnohara-jima	大野原島鳥獣保護区		Tokyo	34°02′41″N 139°23′15″E	5.46	2010	3
Nishinoshima	西之島鳥獣保護区		Tokyo	27°14′49″N 140°52′28″E	0.29	2008	3
North Iwo Jima	北硫黄島鳥獣保護区		Tokyo	25°26′17″N 141°16′59″E	8.60	2009	3
Minamitorishima	南鳥島鳥獣保護区		Tokyo	24°16′59″N 153°59′11″E	3.95	2009	3
Nanatsu-jima	七ツ島鳥獣保護区		Ishikawa	37°36′35″N 136°54′05″E	0.24	1973	3
Kiinagashima	紀伊長島鳥獣保護区		Mie	34°11′52″N 136°19′45″E	61.31	1969	3
Kanmurijima - Kutsujima	冠島・沓島鳥獣保護区		Kyoto	35°40′53″N 135°25′28″E	13.00	2010	3
Kakui Island	鹿久居島鳥獣保護区		Okayama	34°43′10″N 134°18′20″E	6.62	1953	3
Okinoshima	沖ノ島鳥獣保護区		Fukuoka	34°14′40″N 130°06′15″E	0.97	1984	3
Danjo Islands	男女群島鳥獣保護区		Nagasaki	31°59′20″N 128°21′07″E	4.16	1973	3
Birōjima	枇榔島鳥獣保護区		Miyazaki	32°27′54″N 131°43′51″E	4.82	2010	3
Kusagaki-jima	草垣島鳥獣保護区		Kagoshima	30°50′32″N 129°26′01″E	0.21	1973	3
Nakanokami Island	仲の神島鳥獣保護区		Okinawa	24°11′42″N 123°33′50″E	0.18	1981	3
Shiretoko	知床鳥獣保護区		Hokkaidō	44°03′17″N 145°06′14″E	440.53	1982	4
Kushiro Shitsugen	釧路湿原鳥獣保護区		Hokkaidō	43°03′59″N 144°17′49″E	172.41	1958	4
Western Shimokita	下北西部鳥獣保護区		Aomori	41°18′52″N 141°05′21″E	49.14	1984	4
Hotokenuma	仏沼鳥獣保護区		Aomori	40°48′55″N 141°22′52″E	7.37	2005	4
Ōgata Grasslands	大潟草原鳥獣保護区		Akita	40°00′56″N 139°57′08″E	1.50	1977	4
Mount Moriyoshi	森吉山鳥獣保護区		Akita	39°58′35″N 140°32′40″E	65.98	1973	4
Ōshima Asahi	大鳥朝日鳥獣保護区		Yamagata, Niigata	38°15′38″N 139°55′20″E	382.85	1984	4
Tori-shima	鳥島鳥獣保護区		Tokyo	30°29′02″N 140°18′11″E	4.79	1954	4
Ogasawara	小笠原群島鳥獣保護区		Tokyo	27°06′32″N 142°12′14″E	200.65	1980	4
Eastern Sado	小佐渡東部鳥獣保護区		Niigata	38°03′55″N 138°26′14″E	129.19	1982	4
Northern Alps	北アルプス鳥獣保護区		Toyama, Nagano, Gifu	36°16′19″N 137°38′12″E	1,099.89	1984	4
Maruyama River Basin	円山川下流域鳥獣保護区		Hyōgo	35°38′45″N 134°49′49″E	10.84	2012	4
Ina	伊奈鳥獣保護区		Nagasaki	34°36′22″N 129°25′08″E	11.73	1988	4
Shūshinouchi	舟志ノ内鳥獣保護区		Nagasaki	34°35′59″N 129°26′08″E	3.40	2015	4
Mount Yuwan	湯湾岳鳥獣保護区		Kagoshima	31°44′18″N 130°38′51″E	3.20	1965	4
Nagura-Anparu	名蔵アンパル鳥獣保護区		Okinawa	24°22′50″N 124°07′56″E	11.45	2003	4
Yanbaru (Ada)	やんばる（安田）鳥獣保護区		Okinawa	26°45′10″N 128°19′32″E	12.79	2009	4
Yanbaru (Aha)	やんばる（安波）鳥獣保護区		Okinawa	26°42′59″N 128°15′55″E	4.65	2009	4
Daitō Islands	大東諸島鳥獣保護区		Okinawa	25°51′26″N 131°14′18″E	42.51	2004	4
Yonaguni	与那国鳥獣保護区		Okinawa	24°26′59″N 122°58′27″E	10.40	2010	4
Iriomote	西表鳥獣保護区		Okinawa	24°20′29″N 123°49′26″E	102.18	1992	4

== Complementary measures ==
Wildlife Protection Areas are just one element in a network of complementary protected area systems. Others include Wilderness Areas and Nature Conservation Areas under the Nature Conservation Law; Natural Parks under the Natural Parks Law; Natural Habitat Conservation Areas under the Law for the Conservation of Endangered Species of Wild Fauna and Flora; Natural Monuments and Special Natural Monuments under the Law for the Protection of Cultural Properties 1950; Protected Forests under the National Forest Management Bylaw; and Protected Waters under the Preservation of Fisheries Resources Law. Areas are also protected in accordance with three international programmes: the World Heritage Convention (see Yakushima, Shirakami-Sanchi, Shiretoko, and Ogasawara Islands); Man and the Biosphere Programme (see Yakushima, Mount Ōmine/Mount Ōdaigahara, Hakusan, and Shiga Kōgen); and the Ramsar Convention (see Ramsar Sites in Japan).

== See also ==
- Wildlife of Japan
- National Parks of Japan
- Environmental issues in Japan
