= Yoshio Abe =

- 阿部 余四男
- Born: January 3, 1891; Yamagata Prefecture, Japan
- Died: April 22, 1960 (aged 69)
- Education: University of Tokyo
- Known for: Dracoderes abei; Abe's salamander; Abe's Whiskered Bat; Myotis abei

Yoshio Abe (Japanese: 阿部 余四男, Hepburn: Abe Yoshio; 3 January 1891 – 22 April 1960), from Yamagata Prefecture, was a professor of zoology at Hiroshima University of Arts and Science which was amalgamated into Hiroshima University by the enactment of National School Establishment Law and the above-mentioned Hiroshima University after the amalgamation.

Abe graduate from University of Tokyo and was the first Japanese scientist to study kinorhynchs, with one such animal, Dracoderes abei, being named after him. Also named after him was Abe's salamander and Abe's Whiskered Bat, Myotis abei Yoshikura 1944, as a tribute from one of his students.
