= Areas protected under the Nature Conservation Law of Japan =

List of protected areas in Japan

The Nature Conservation Law (自然環境保全法, shizen kankyō hozen-hō) of Japan provides for the designation of three types of protected area: Wilderness Areas (原生自然環境保全地域) and Nature Conservation Areas (自然環境保全地域), by the Minister of the Environment, and Prefectural Nature Conservation Areas (都道府県自然環境保全地域), by Prefectural Governors.

== Wilderness Areas ==
As of 31 March 2015, five Wilderness Areas have been designated, with a total area of 56.31 km^{2}.

Wilderness Area	Prefecture	Municipality	Area (ha)	Image	Coordinates
Onnebetsudake Wilderness Area 遠音別岳原生自然環境保全地域; Onnebetsu-dake gensei shizen kankyō hozen chiiki	Hokkaidō	Shari, Rausu	1,895		43°59′36″N 145°00′44″E
Head of River Tokachi Wilderness Area 十勝川源流部原生自然環境保全地域; Tokachi-gawa genryū-bu gensei shizen kankyō hozen chiiki	Hokkaidō	Shintoku	1,035		43°16′27″N 142°55′11″E
Minami Iwojima Wilderness Area 南硫黄島原生自然環境保全地域; Minami-Iōjima gensei shizen kankyō hozen chiiki	Tokyo	Ogasawara	367		24°14′11″N 141°27′47″E
Head of River Ooi Wilderness Area 大井川源流部原生自然環境保全地域; Ōi-gawa genryū-bu gensei shizen kankyō hozen chiiki	Shizuoka	Kawanehon	1,115		35°06′44″N 138°08′27″E
Yakushima Wilderness Area 屋久島原生自然環境保全地域; Yakushima gensei shizen kankyō hozen chiiki	Kagoshima	Yakushima	1,219		30°20′35″N 130°30′41″E

== Nature Conservation Areas ==
As of 31 March 2015, ten Nature Conservation Areas have been designated, with a total area of 225.42 km^{2}.

Wilderness Area	Prefecture	Municipality	Area (ha)	Image	Coordinates
Ōhirayama Nature Conservation Area 大平山自然環境保全地域; Ōhirayama shizen kankyō hozen chiiki	Hokkaidō	Shimamaki	674		42°38′07″N 140°08′08″E
Shirakami sanchi Nature Conservation Area 白神山地自然環境保全地域; Shirakami sanchi shizen kankyō hozen chiiki	Aomori, Akita	Ajigasawa, Fukaura, Nishimeya, Fujisato	14,043		40°34′44″N 140°17′54″E
Wagadake Nature Conservation Area 和賀岳自然環境保全地域; Wagadake shizen kankyō hozen chiiki	Iwate	Nishiwaga	1,451		39°34′13″N 140°45′15″E
Hayachine Nature Conservation Area 早池峰自然環境保全地域; Hayachine shizen kankyō hozen chiiki	Iwate	Miyako	1,370		39°33′34″N 141°29′09″E
Ōsabiyama Nature Conservation Area 大佐飛山自然環境保全地域; Ōsabiyama shizen kankyō hozen chiiki	Tochigi	Nasushiobara	545		37°03′49″N 139°50′38″E
Head of River Tone Nature Conservation Area 利根川源流部自然環境保全地域; Tone-gawa genryū-bu shizen kankyō hozen chiiki	Gunma	Minakami	2,318		36°59′07″N 139°06′44″E
Sasagamine Nature Conservation Area 笹ヶ峰自然環境保全地域; Sasagamine shizen kankyō hozen chiiki	Ehime, Kōchi	Niihama, Saijō, Ino	537		33°49′40″N 133°16′25″E
Shiragadake Nature Conservation Area 白髪岳自然環境保全地域; Shiragadake shizen kankyō hozen chiiki	Kumamoto	Asagiri	150		32°09′00″N 130°56′37″E
Inaodake Nature Conservation Area 稲尾岳自然環境保全地域; Inaodake shizen kankyō hozen chiiki	Kagoshima	Kimotsuki, Kinkō, Minamiōsumi	377		31°07′24″N 130°53′08″E
Sakiyamawan-Amitoriwan Nature Conservation Area 崎山湾・網取湾自然環境保全地域; Sakiyamawan・Amitoriwan shizen kankyō hozen chiiki	Okinawa	Taketomi	1,077		24°18′58″N 123°40′44″E

== Prefectural Nature Conservation Areas ==
As of 31 March 2015, five hundred and forty-four Prefectural Nature Conservation Areas have been designated, with a total area of 774.08 km^{2}.

- Miyazaki: Kashiba (樫葉)・Northern Kamon-dake (掃部岳北部)
- Kagoshima: Koba-dake (木場岳)・Mangurō (万九郎)
- Okinawa: Kubura-dake (久部良岳)・Urabuta-dake (宇良部岳)・Higawa-chisaki (比川地先)・Agari-zaki (東崎)・Tanokuba-yama (田名の久葉山)・Kushi-dake (後岳)・Koshi-dake (腰岳)・Gayō-zan (賀陽山)・Aha-take (阿波岳)・Izena-yama (伊是名山)・Katsuu-dake - Awa-dake - Yae-dake (嘉津宇岳・安和岳・八重岳)

== See also ==
- Wildlife of Japan
- National Parks of Japan
- Wildlife Protection Areas in Japan
- Natural Habitat Conservation Areas in Japan
- Environmental issues in Japan
