= Mount Amakazari =

Mountain in Japan

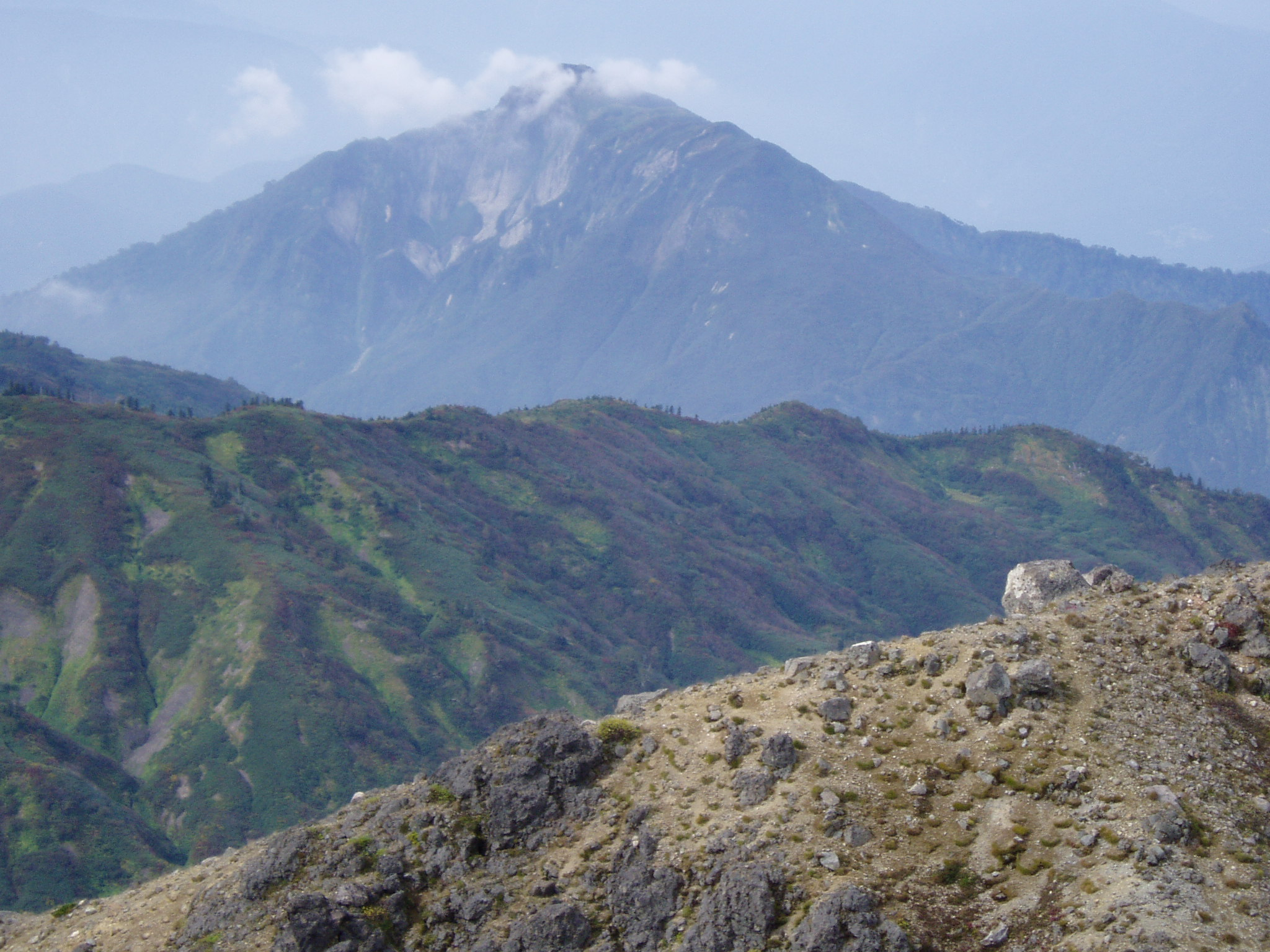
- ENE face of Mt. Amakazari as seen from Mt. Yake (2005)

Highest point
- Elevation: 1,963 m (6,440 ft)
- Listing: Mountains and hills of Japan
- Coordinates: 36°54′07″N 137°57′45″E

Geography
- Location within Japan
- Location: Chūbu region, Honshu, Japan.

Mount Amakazari (雨飾山, Amakazari-yama) is a mountain in the Chūbu region, Central Honshu, Japan. Located between Niigata and Nagano prefectures, the mountain is considered one of the 100 Mountains of Japan. Several hiking paths lead up the mountain, along which can be found a number of natural hot springs.
