= Coral in non-tropical regions =

Phenomenon caused by climate change

The poleward migration of coral species refers to the phenomenon brought on by rising sea temperatures, wherein corals are colonizing cooler climates in an attempt to circumvent coral bleaching, rising sea levels and ocean acidification. In the age of Anthropocene, the changing global climate has disrupted fundamental natural processes and brought about observable changes in the submarine sphere. Whilst coral reefs are bleaching in tropical areas like the Great Barrier Reef, even more striking, and perhaps more alarming; is the growth of tropical coral species in temperate regions, which has taken place over the past decade. Coral reefs are frequently compared to the "canaries in the coal mine," who were used by miners as an indicator of air quality. In much the same way, "coral reefs are sensitive to environmental changes that could damage other habitats in the future," meaning they will be the first to visually exhibit the true implications of global warming on the natural world.

== A brief summary of climate change ==
=== Past global warming events ===
Climate change is not a new phenomena. Marine life have always been susceptible to the heating and cooling of the Earth. Modern corals first appeared over 200 million years ago in the Jurassic Period, and have survived Earth's many cataclysms since then, including periods when atmospheric CO_{2} was much higher than at present. Current coral reef ecosystems are threatened by several factors including rising sea temperatures. Many have been damaged by destructive fishing practices, which involve the use of dynamite and trawl nets. Others, on the continental shelf, have been blanketed by silt from erosion inland. Pollution from coastal cities and agriculture can cause nutrient loading leading to reefs being overgrown by algae or damaged by pollutants. Severe storms can also impact coral and accelerate reef erosion.

=== Current global warming events ===
Human-induced factors including increased greenhouse gas emissions - increases in atmospheric CO_{2} and other long-lived greenhouse gases like methane, nitrous oxide and halocarbons - and changes to land cover - which refers to the replacement of darker forests with paler croplands and grasslands - have led to this rapid increase in temperature, which has taken place over the past 50 years. In addition to the ones previously listed, global warming has also prompted the development of harmful anomalies, including a serious decline in krill populations and a widespread growth of ‘crown of thorns’ starfish, sea urchins and jellyfish; all of whom contribute to the deterioration of coral reefs and their inhabitants. But coral bleaching, rising sea levels and ocean acidification pose a far greater threat than these natural anomalies. Their combined impact has led to the decimation of almost 50% of the world's coral reefs, and has forced remaining corals to abandon their tropical homes in order to colonize cooler waters. Both their decimation and their migration are having observable and catastrophic effects on the entire marine ecosystem.

== Threats to coral in tropical regions ==
=== Coral bleaching ===
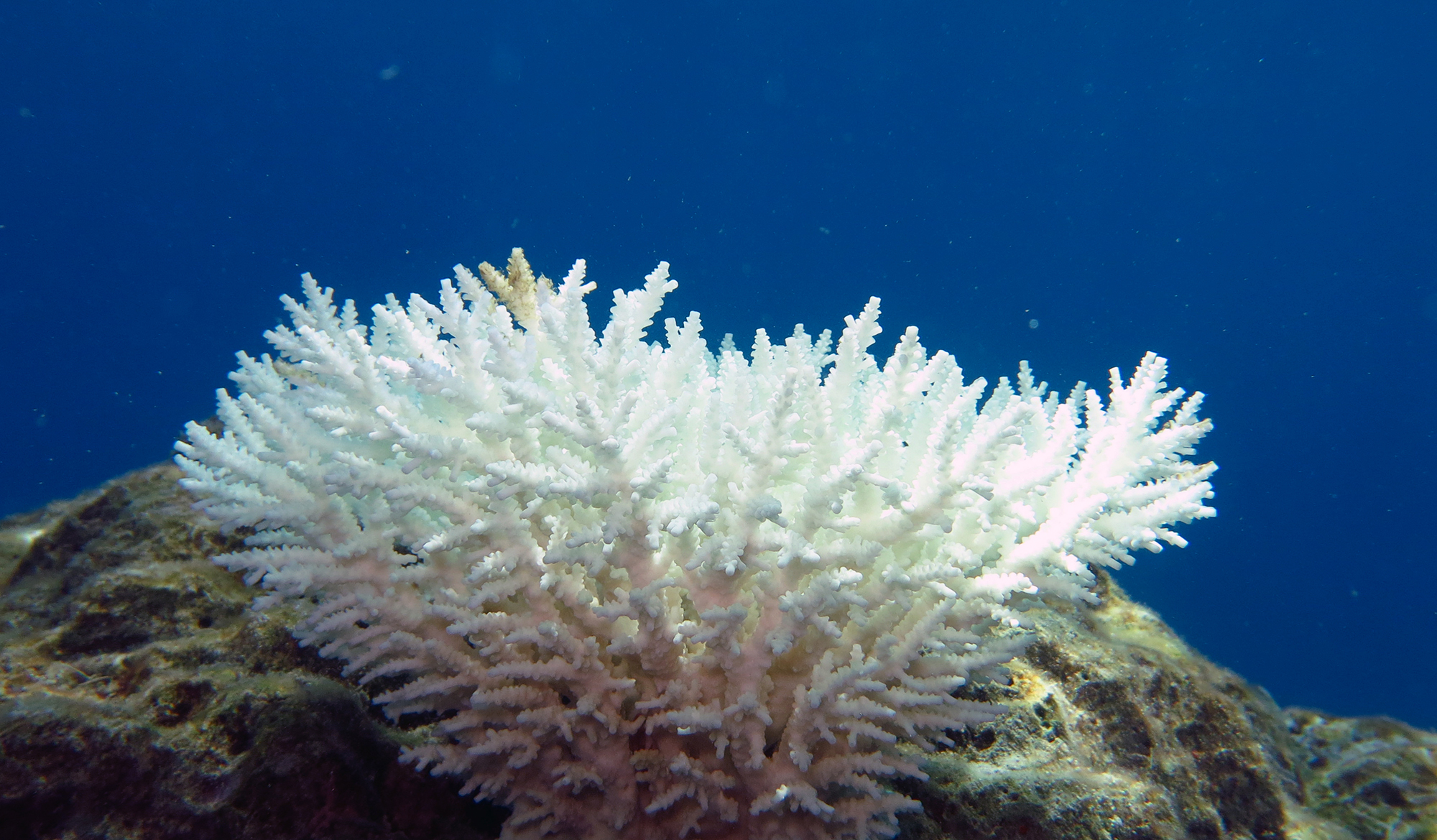
Bleached colony of Acropora coral

There is a symbiotic relationship between coral polyps and the photosynthesising algae called zooxanthellae, without which, neither would survive. When sea surface temperatures exceed approximately 29 °C or more, even for a couple of days, the relationship between the coral and its zooxanthellae becomes unbalanced. Since the coral animal has become unable to harvest sufficient energy at this point, it expels the zooxanthellae, and turns white, aka. 'bleaches.' But without this major source of nutrition, the coral soon perishes; unless water temperatures fall and the zooxanthellae are replaced. Although it is possible for corals to recover from bleaching, it takes several years, and the recent increase in scale and frequency of global bleaching events means reefs are not being given the time they need to recuperate. In 2010 alone, 80% of the Indonesia's corals died, and in 2016, 29% of the Great Barrier Reef bleached. According to the National Oceanic and Atmospheric Association, roughly 75% of the world's tropical coral reefs experienced severe enough heat to trigger bleaching between 2014 and 2017. It is a global phenomenon, with just 2% of Indo-Pacific reefs containing as much live coral as they did in the 1980s. This means reef growth and physical erosion must be finely balanced, or else extinction is a risk.

=== Rising sea levels ===
Coral reefs have survived over many millions of years, despite ample fluctuations in climate and sea-levels, over many glacial-interglacial cycles. The disappearance of reefs in the past has been attributed to fluctuations – either the sea levels have declined so much that corals were exposed and perished, or the waters rose so much that the corals drowned – Earth's reefs are facing a whole new threat of extinction on an unprecedented level. What is new in the present is the scale and frequency of sea-level rising and warming, combined with greatly increased atmospheric CO_{2} concentrations, and other stressors induced by harmful human activities. Warming at the end of the last glaciation was on average about 1 °C per thousand years, and has since risen by 0.5 degrees in the past century. Similarly, sea levels rose during the last glaciation at an average rate of 1m per 100 years, and has since increased by 25 cm, which is problematic because corals rely on a close proximity to the sun in order to photosynthesize. Whilst expected rates of temperature and sea-level rise for the next century are thus not in themselves unprecedented, they will occur in a vastly different context.

=== Ocean acidification ===
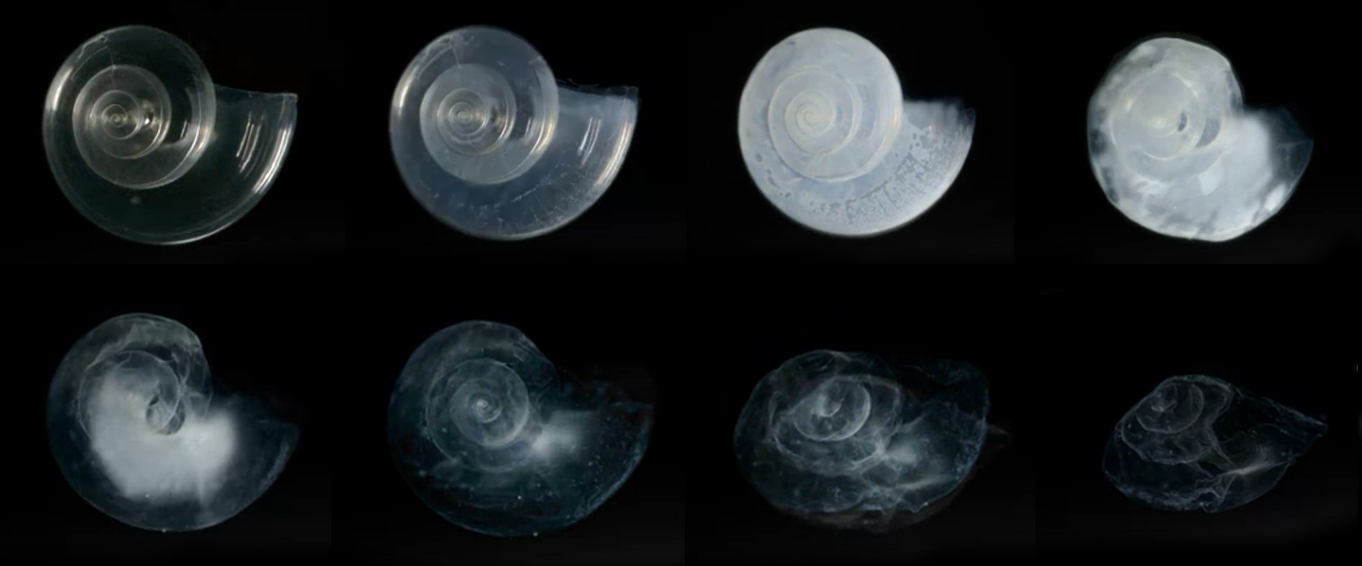
Pteropod shell dissolved in seawater adjusted to an ocean chemistry projected for the year 2100

Since the Industrial Revolution began, the pH of surface ocean waters has fallen by 0.1 pH units, and since the pH scale is logarithmic, this change represents a 30% increase in acidity. Ocean acidification refers to this increase in acidity and subsequent decrease in the pH of Earth's oceans, which is highly problematic when it comes to absorbing atmospheric CO_{2}. Even though nearly 50% of the world's coral reefs have been lost or severely damaged, coral reefs absorb even more CO_{2} than trees. As a whole, the ocean actually absorbs 93% of the heat, which is trapped on earth by atmospheric carbon. Coral reefs contribute to this by photosynthesizing carbon themselves; and by supporting ocean organisms like phytoplankton and pteropods, who use atmospheric carbon to build their bodies and shells from calcium carbonate. When they die, they sink below the sunlit surface layer of the sea to the ocean floor and become incorporated into the sediments. It is the combination of processes like these that remove carbon dioxide from the atmosphere; which is one of the few semi-permanent ways of doing so. However, at low seawater pH (which is about 7.8 and below), forming calcium carbonate shells becomes far more difficult, as does absorbing atmospheric CO_{2}. This means that soon enough, ocean acidification will slow the formation of the reef itself and finally prevent it forming at all in large portions of the ocean. If this were to happen, and if the ocean became incapable of absorbing carbon dioxide, then scientists predict the Earth's surface will exceed 50 °C, which is possibly uninhabitable.

== The poleward migration of coral species ==
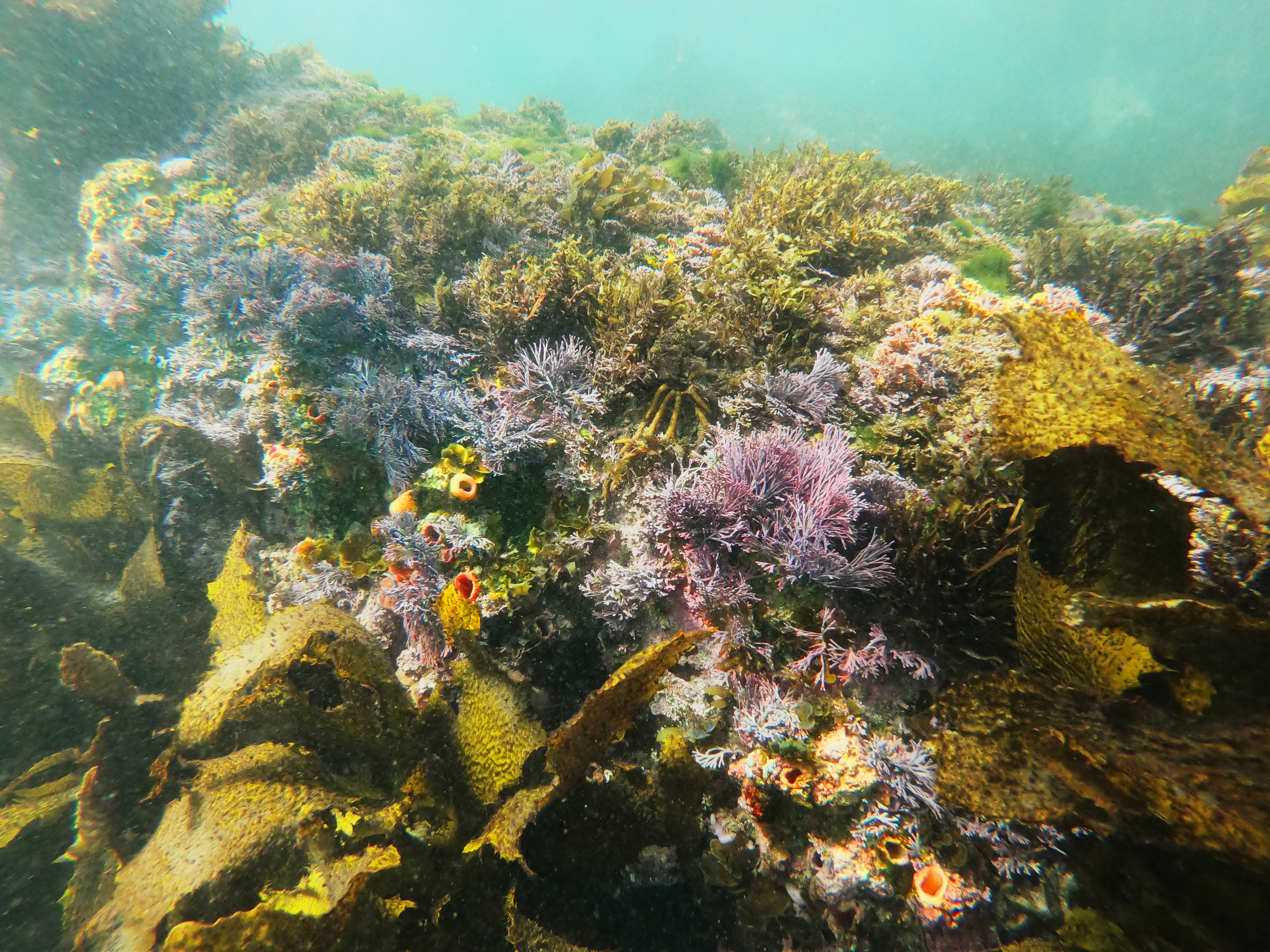
Coral Growth in Cabbage Tree Bay, NSW.

Corals might evade ocean warming by migrating into what had been cooler waters. The planktonic larvae of the corals could colonize suitable new areas, but for corals in places like the Great Barrier Reef; the required migration rate is about 15 km per year, which is much faster than corals can grow. Another downside is that ocean acidification impacts are more severe in cooler waters. Coral reefs may therefore be "squeezed into a narrower latitudinal distribution by ocean warming in the tropics, and ocean acidification in cooler oceans." This phenomenon has been referred to as the global poleward migration of coral species - who are seeking cooler climates - or to the growth of coral in temperate regions.

=== Sydney, Australia ===
Where the Great Barrier Reef's already tropical waters are heating up quickly (sometimes reaching 35 °C), Sydney's slowly warming and previously temperate waters are becoming increasingly biodiverse. At least four types of hard and branching corals have been identified in Sydney's Northern Beaches, including the Pocillopora aliciae; a species which Marine Ecologist and University Professor Douglas Booth observes had only been recorded in Port Stephens, which is approximately 120 km to the north. This is the furthest recorded southern migration of any tropical coral species, which is due possibly to the strength of the East Australian Current, which is driving species southwards along the east coast. These branching corals are providing habitats for a range of marine species also typically found much further north, such as trapezia crabs, tropical gobies and multiple species of damselfish. The combined arrival of non-native coral and marine species demonstrates how the poleward migration of tropical coral has the potential to alter marine environments and their inhabitants.

=== Japan ===
Corals in Japan are fleeing northwards, according to a recent study conducted by Hiroyo Yamana of the Centre for Global Environmental Research in Tsukuba, Japan. He tracked the movement of corals at 14 km per year. Compared to the average rate of expansion for land-dwelling plants and animals, which is 1 km per year, this is a relatively fast migration, one that would not even be seen in geological time. Of the nine different coral types which Yamano and his team had determined the location of colonies, they discovered that four had moved polewards over the past 100 years, and five had remained stable. Yamano noted that the four which moved had been identified as "vulnerable" or "near threatened" by the International Union for Conservation of Nature since 1998. The speed of their migration is perhaps due to the poleward movement of ocean currents which run along the east coasts of Japan, and which have the capacity to carry coral polyps to "newly suitable areas for colonies or reefs."

Previously less common species are thought to be becoming more common, and corals are replacing seagrasses in some areas.

== Ramifications for life on earth ==
=== Marine life ===
The poleward migration might be 'good news' for the survival of certain vulnerable coral species, but it is not necessarily a positive instalment for marine ecosystems as a whole. As the oceans surrounding South Africa warm in some areas and cool in others, many submarine plants and animals have been forced to relocate, which has brought about observable ecological change, and generated good reason for environmental concern.

As the south-western coast environment cools, many marine organisms, such as "mussels, kelp, barnacles, crabs, rock lobsters, anchovy, sardines and sub-tropical fish,". have migrated towards to the warming eastern coast. Less obvious, too, are tiny planktonic organisms, who are the "real powerhouses of marine ecosystems." Rock lobsters are major predators of bottom-living organisms, such as algae-eating sea urchins and abalone. Their eastern migration towards Cape Point means that these herbivores have all but disappeared from the area, which has allowed kelp and other algae to flourish. The result is the transformation of a grazer-dominated community to a algae-dominated community. In addition, whilst two-thirds of all anchovy and sardine biomass were distributed along the west coast prior to 1995, almost three quarters of them now reside in the east, as of 2008. This has led to the creation of a relatively severe geographical mismatch between seabird and seal breeding colonies on west coast islands and their "now distant prey". B. Scholes has observed a strong correlation between the eastern migration of the before-mentioned organisms and declining seabird breeding success. The population collapse has perhaps been most dramatic for penguins in particular, who, due to their incapacity to fly, are unable to forage over great distances. Additionally, since the Agulhas Current has warmed, reef-building corals on the east coast are slowly migrating southwards, since high temperatures in the North has severely damaged reefs in Kenya and Tanzania

In other words, this means that coral species are abandoning the east coast, and foreign predators are moving in. The changes taking place in South Africa, and in the submarine world as a whole, are (1) creating a disparity between predator and prey, (2) altering breeding habits and migratory patterns and (3) transforming coral reefs, which protect and sustain all types of marine life, into algae-dominated communities, which cannot be expected to support the life which is now gathering in the east. Their collective impact, as a result of rising temperatures, poses a significant threat to native and non-native marine species.

=== Human life ===
If coral reefs are to completely abandon their tropical homes, there will possibly be implications for human communities as well, since coral reefs form the bedrock of underwater biodiversity, upon which many livelihoods depend. Reefs account for 600,000 square kilometres of the earth's surface (Crossland, Hatcher, & Smith, 1990), which means they cover less than 2% of the ocean floor; and yet they constitute one of the most highly diverse ecosystems in the world, providing a marine habitat to over 30,000 species of organisms (Burke, 2012). They permanently accommodate, and offer protection from predators, for over 25% of the global fish population, and provide nurseries for the majority of submarine life. Not only are they biologically important for the marine ecosystem as a whole, but they are socially and economically important, for sustaining fisheries and producing income for developing nations through tourism. This is particularly pertinent for coastline communities like Indonesia, who rely heavily on the tourism of their reefs, which is estimated to bring in approximately $375 billion every year. Many people's livelihoods therefore depend on the health of coral reefs and the biodiversity they support. In addition, coral reefs also provide food and medicines, protection from erosion on coastlines and sand for beaches.
