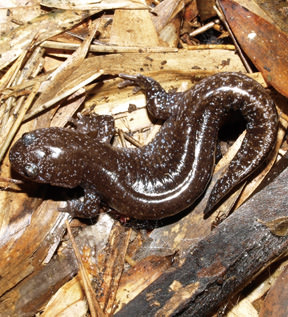

Conservation status
- Endangered (IUCN 3.1)

Scientific classification
- Kingdom: Animalia
- Phylum: Chordata
- Class: Amphibia
- Order: Urodela
- Family: Hynobiidae
- Genus: Hynobius
- Species: H. abei

Binomial name
- Hynobius abei Sato, 1934

= Abe's salamander =

Species of amphibian

The Abe's salamander (Hynobius abei) is a species of salamander in the family Hynobiidae. It is endemic to Japan and known from southwestern Honshu in northern parts of the Fukui, Kyoto, and Hyōgo Prefectures. The specific name abei honours professor Yoshio Abe, a Japanese zoologist.

== Description ==
Adults measure 47–71 mm (1.9–2.8 in) in snout–vent length and 82–122 mm (3.2–4.8 in) in total length. The trunk is stocky, and the limbs are relatively short. There are 11–13 costal grooves. The tail is thick at the base and laterally compressed towards the tip. Dorsal colouration is reddish brown to dark brown. There are small pale spots on the flanks and the limbs. During the breeding season, the tail becomes very high and compressed in males. Their jowls also swell, making the head to appear somewhat triangular.

== Reproduction ==
Reproduction starts in November–December, at the time of the snowfall. Females lay paired egg sacs containing 26 to 109 in total. The egg sacs are laid under leaves at the bottom of breeding ponds. Larval development is slow in winter but accelerates after the snow melt. Metamorphosis occurs typically in June–July, but some individuals may metamorphose later and even overwinter as larvae.

== Habitat and conservation ==
Abe's salamander occurs in secondary broad-leaved evergreen and deciduous forests and in bamboo forests. Breeding takes place in pools, ditches, and springs in shaded parts of forests. All populations are small and susceptible to habitat loss (e.g., one population was destroyed by construction of a road).
