= Flora of Japan =

Plant species of Japan

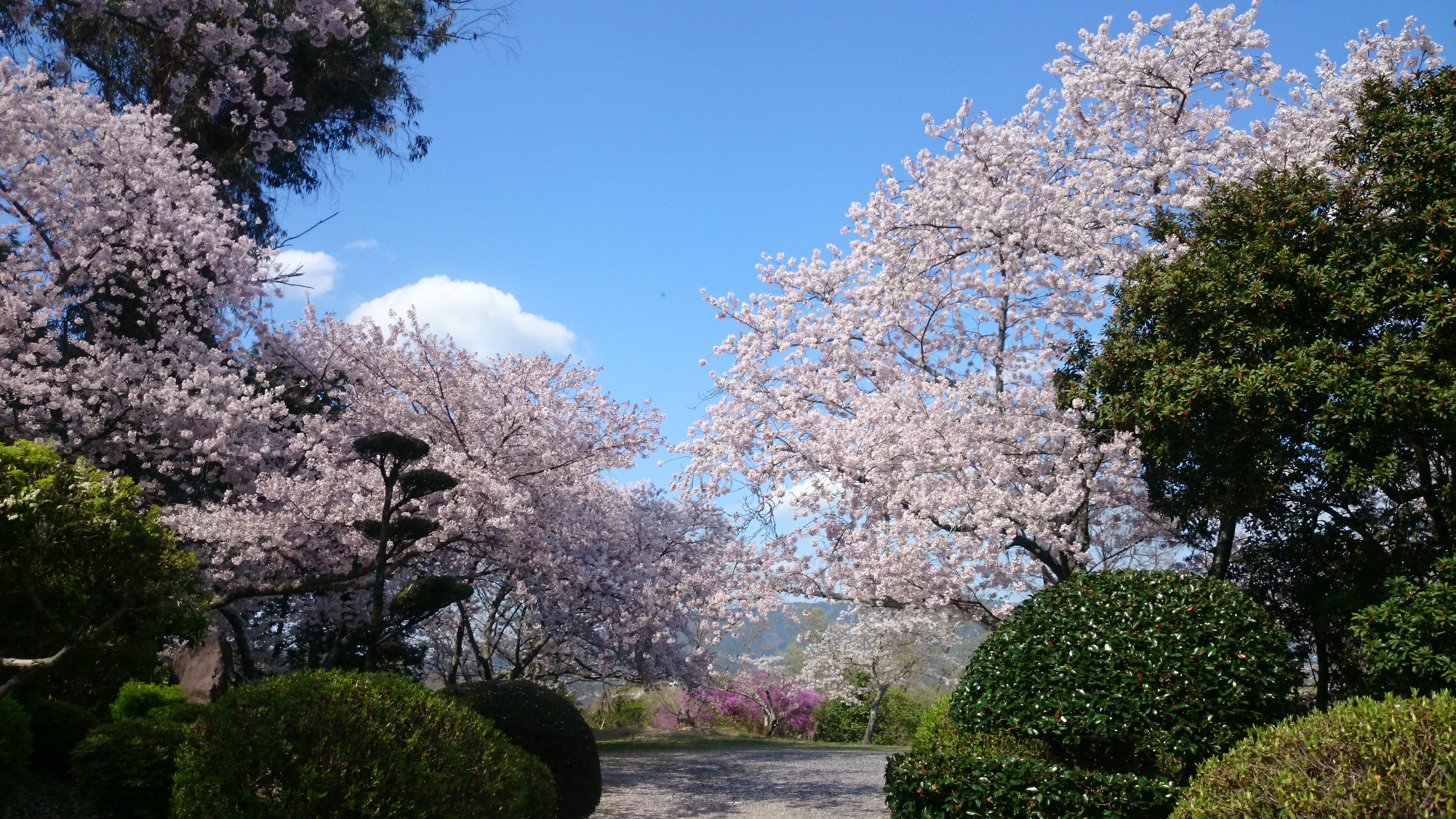
Cherry blossom in Sugimura Park

Japan contains vast islands, with its southernmost tropical prefecture of Okinawa to its northernmost chilly prefecture of Hokkaido. Japan contains circa 5,500 indigenous species of plants on its 377,975 square-kilometer land mass. The flora of Japan comprises a large assemblage of plant species which can be found in Japan, such as sakura, katsura, momiji and azalea. There are many species which are endemic to Japan.

Japan has significant diversity in flora. Approximately 7,000 plant species that inhabit Japan of which one-third are only found in Japan, making them endemic. Diversity is much more vast in the Amami-oshima and Tokunoshima islands of the Ryukyu archipelago. They share a unique biodiverse relationship with Okinawa island, making it a hostpot for flora diversity. The richness of Japan's flora diversity is due partly through its variation in latitude and altitude, climatic conditions like monsoons, and multiple geohistorical incidences of connections with the mainland. .

== Vegetation types ==
Though Japan has many vegetation zones, it consists mainly of the alpine region, subalpine region, summer-green broad-leaved forest region and evergreen broad-leaved forest region. These zones are classified through identifying leaf type of a dominant species and temperature conditions of the environment.

Due to its substantial length of over 3,000 km from north to south and its mountain ranges that can exceed 3,000 meters, Japan's vegetation varies by latitude and by altitude. Evergreen forests tend to appear in the southern half of the Japanese mainland, with broad leaf forests, subalpine, and alpine appearing with increasing frequency to the north and near mountains.

Forests in Japan provide a diverse set of vegetation from East Asia with 66.6% of the land covered with natural an subsituational vegetation and plantations. Some of the important requirements for understanding biodiversity in Japan need to consist of learning the classification on the species, such as using a phytosociological method.

=== Evergreen broad-leaved forest region ===
The evergreen forest zone can be found along the coasts of the southern half of Japan and is most common zone in the Ryukyu Islands, Shikoku and, Kyushu as well as parts of southwestern Honshu with equal longitude. This forest regions altitude can vary greatly, spanning as low as 600 meters and as high as 1500 meters. At the coasts, the dominant forest canopy species are Castanopsis cuspidata and Machilus thunbergii. Inland, trees belonging to the genus Quercus are dominant. In lower layers, trees and shrub species include Camellia japonica, Neolitsea sericea, Aucuba japonica, and Eurya japonica. A large distribution of oak trees can be found at higher altitudes of the evergreen broad-leaved forest region, depending upon the topography and conditions of the soil. It is a characteristic of this zone that all these are evergreen species.

=== Summergreen broad-leaved forest region ===
These forests can be found in central Japan above 1,000 meters altitude and throughout parts of Hokkaido at elevations between 700 and 1,600 meters. These forests are also called Fagus crenata forests due to the prevalence of this tree species. On the western side, common species include Daphniphyllum macropodum, Cephalotaxus harringtonii, and Aucuba japonica. On the eastern side facing the Pacific Ocean, important species include Ulmus japonica, Arachniodes standishii , and Laportea macrostachya. This region has been particularly affected by human development and clearing of natural forests. Cleared lands tend to be replanted with Larix kaempferi, Cryptomeria japonica , and Chamaecyparis obtusa.

=== Subalpine and alpine regions ===
At 1,600 to 2,500 meters lies Honshu, the main island, and at a slightly lower altitude is Hokkaido, the northern Island. Northern Honshu and Hokkaido vary great similarities in their regions. Both hosting similar species of subalpine zones like Vaccinium vitis-idaea, Vaccinium ovalifolium, Neottia cordata, Coptis trifolia. Distinguishing trees include Abies mariesii, Larix kaempferi, and Tsuga diversifolia. Unlike most of Honshu, Hokkaido reigns a harsh environment for plants. Hokkaido has intense winds and solar radiation, dry and poor-nutrient soils, and long and extreme winters. At this region lies the Taisetsu Mountains that hosts plenty of alpine plants like the dwarf pine and cushion plants.

Above 2500 meters, vegetation has to contend with significant snowfall and high winds. Genera that can survive in these conditions include Phyllodoce and Harrimanella.

== Endangered species and conservation ==
Japan is a large, biodiverse country with its plenty of islands and regions that vary from tropical to harsh snowy regions. With its estimated 5,000 to 7,000 vascular species, 1,690 are classified as endangered. Due to ecological destruction caused by human activity, over-trading plant species, and climate change, it leads Japan to create a red list for its endangered species.

A table created by Kunio Iwatsuki EX: Extinct, EW: Extinct in the wild, CR: Critically Endangered, EN: Endangered, VU: Vulnerable, NT: Near Threatened, DD: Data Deficient

Though Japan has a near quarter percentage of threatened species, they still acclaim their conservation status to be successful. In the past quarter century, Japan has included many conservation activities, such as communicating the research and importance of its flora, hosting governmental and nongovernmental organizations to conserve endangered species, increasing research funding of species, and restoring critically endangered species on the red list.

== List ==
- Cercidiphyllum
- Japanese maple
- Glaucidium palmatum
- Castanopsis sieboldii
- Quercus miyagii
- Mitrastemon yamamotoi
- Machilus thunbergii
- Anemonopsis macrophylla
- Azalea
- Chrysanthemum
- Reynoutria japonica
- Japanese beech
- Konara
- Cherry blossom
- Pinus pumila
- Hinoki cypress
- Japanese red pine
- Sakaki evergreen
- Japanese red cedar
- Pinus luchuensis
- Cryptotaenia japonica
- Acer ginnala
- Wasabi
- Nandina
- Japanese holly
- Japanese iris
- Juniperus procumbens
- Pittosporum tobira
- Hosta
- Styrax japonicus
- Wisteria floribunda
- Japanese black pine
- Prunus × yedoensis
- Pinus amamiana
- Acer japonicum
- Sciadopitys
- Myoga
- Chamaecyparis pisifera
- Gastrodia amamiana
- Juglans ailantifolia
- Yomogi

== Publications ==
The flora of Japan is extensively described in scientific publications such as :

- Makino, T., 1940. Illustrated flora of Japan. Hokuryukan (with renewed editions in 1961 and 1996)
- Ohwi, J., 1965. Flora of Japan (in English). A combined, much revised, and extended translation. Smithsonian Institution, Washington D.C.
- Iwatsuki, K. (岩槻, 邦男), Boufford, D.E. & Ohba, H. (大場, 秀章), 1993–2020. Flora of Japan. Kodansha
  - vol. 1 : Pteridophyta and Gymnospermae (1995)
  - vol. 2a-c : Angiospermae, Dicotyledoneae, Archichlamydeae (1999–2006)
  - vol. 3a-b : Angiospermae, Dicotyledoneae, Sympetalae (1993–1995)
  - vol. 4a-b : Angiospermae, Monocotyledoneae (a 2020, b 2016)
  - General index (2020)

More over, here are some publications of interest about the Japanese flora : Tomitarô Makino, who was lecturer of botany at the imperial university of Tokyo, published a large amount of contributions from 1901 to 1914 collectively called "Observations on the flora of Japan" (and before that some other under various names among which "Plantæ Japonenses novæ vel minus cognitæ")

- Makino, T., 1901–1905. Observations on the Flora of Japan (Fascicula 1–5)
- Makino, T., 1896–1914. Observations on the Flora of Japan. published within the botanical journal (in Japanese : 植物学雑誌, romanized : "Shokubutsugaku Zasshi") edited by the Botanical Society of Japan

== See also ==
- List of ecoregions in Japan
- Wildlife of Japan
