= Protected Water Surfaces (Japan) =

Protected areas of water in Japan

Protected Water Surfaces (保護水面, Hogo-suimen) are areas of water in Japan so designated, in accordance with Section 2 of the 1951 Protection of Fishery Resources Act (水産資源保護法), by the Minister of Agriculture, Forestry and Fisheries in conjunction with the prefectural governor in an effort to protect and cultivate the aquatic animals and plants living on and below the surface.

As of August 2002, there were 55 designated Seawater Surfaces (海面), totalling some 2,948 hectares (7,280 acres), and 65 Freshwater Surfaces (内水面), the latter comprising 59 riverine surfaces, with a total length of 2,303 kilometres (1,431 mi), and 6 lacustrine surfaces, with a protected area of 214 hectares (530 acres). Representative of each type are areas of the Seto Inland and Ariake Seas, Ibi, Kinugawa, Nagara, and Tenryū Rivers, and Lakes Biwa and Kasumigaura, respectively.

In these areas, as well as no-take measures, with the harvesting of all or particular species prohibited, and breeding and propagation initiatives, activities including dredging and land reclamation are restricted and regulated.

== See also ==
- Ministry of Agriculture, Forestry and Fisheries (Japan)
- 100 Fishing Village Heritage Sites (Japan)
- Wildlife of Japan: Fish
- Fishing in Japan
