= Wildlife of Japan =

The wildlife of Japan includes its flora, fauna, and natural habitats. The islands of Japan stretch a long distance from north to south and cover a wide range of climatic zones. This results in a high diversity of wildlife despite Japan's isolation from the mainland of Asia. In the north of the country, north of Blakiston's Line, there are many subarctic species which have colonized Japan from the north. In the south there are south-east Asian species, typical of tropical regions. Between these areas lies the temperate zone which shares many species with China and Korea. Japan also has many endemic species that are found nowhere else in the world, making it home to many endangered/rare species.

== Fauna ==
=== Mammals ===
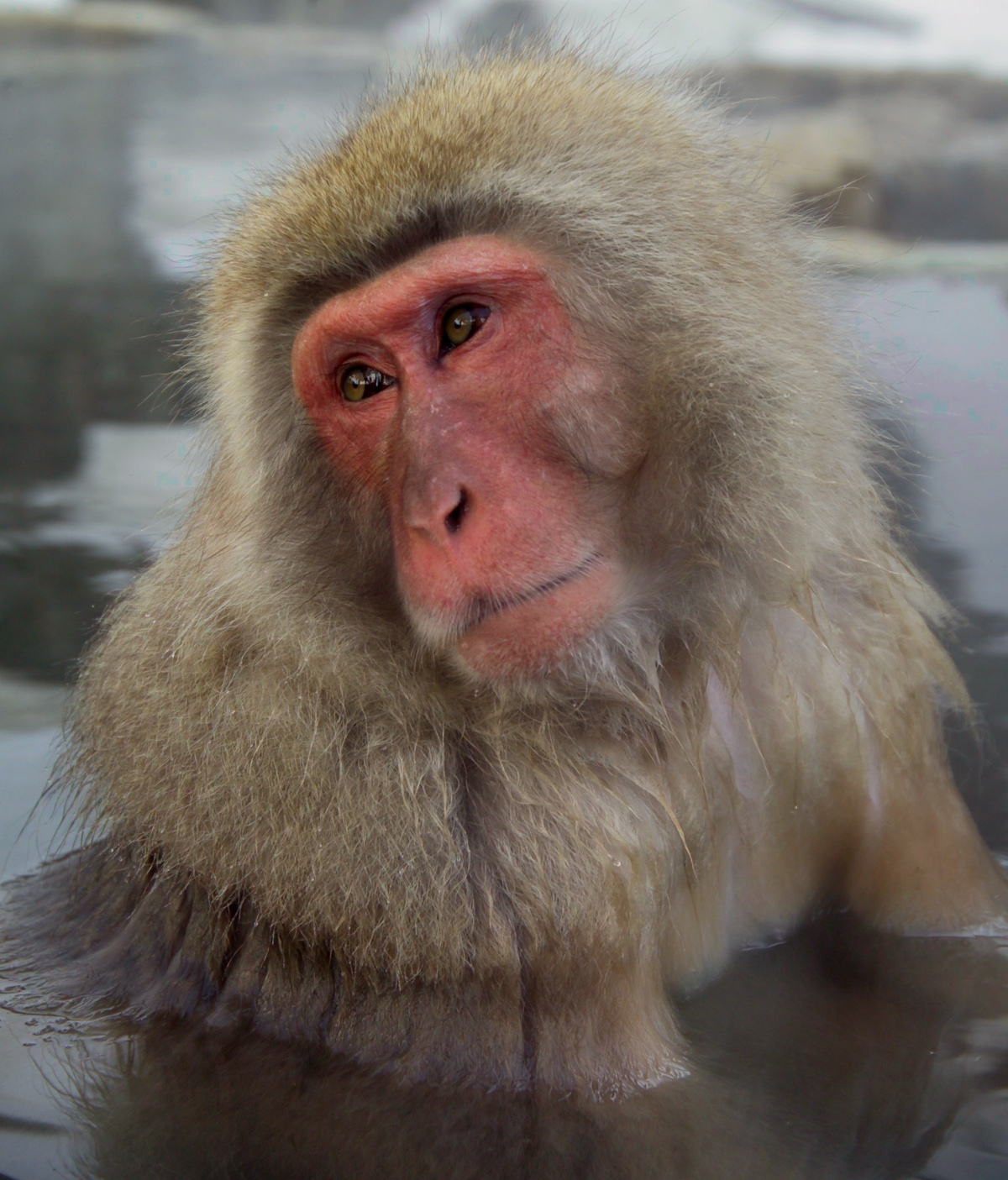
Japanese macaque bathing in hot springs in Nagano prefecture

About 130 species of land mammal occur in Japan. The largest of these are the two bears. The Ussuri brown bear (Ursus arctos), the largest land animal in Japan, is found in Hokkaidō, where it plays an important role in the culture of the Ainu people. The Asian black bear (Ursus thibetanus) inhabits mountainous areas in Honshū, Kyūshū and Shikoku. Smaller carnivores include the red fox (Vulpes vulpes), Japanese raccoon dog (Nyctereutes viverrinus) and Japanese marten (Martes melampus). There are two wild cats in Japan: the leopard cat (Prionailurus bengalensis) of mainland Asia occurs on Tsushima Island while the Iriomote cat (Prionailurus iriomotensis) is unique to the island of Iriomote.

Grazing mammals include the sika deer (Cervus nippon), Japanese serow (Capricornis crispus) and Japanese boar (Sus scrofa leucomystax). Among Japan's most famous mammals is the Japanese macaque (Macaca fuscata), the world's most northerly monkey.

Marine mammals include the sea otter (Enhydra lutris), dugong (Dugong dugon), finless porpoise (Neophocaena phocaenoides) and Steller's sea lion (Eumetopias jubatus).

The extinct elephant Palaeoloxodon naumanni, giant deer Sinomegaceros yabei and cave lions (Panthera spelaea) also formerly inhabited the main islands of the archipelago. Two wolf subspecies found in Japan, the Hokkaido wolf (Canis lupus hattai) and Honshū wolf (Canis lupus hodophylax), went extinct in 1889 and 1905, respectively.

=== Birds ===
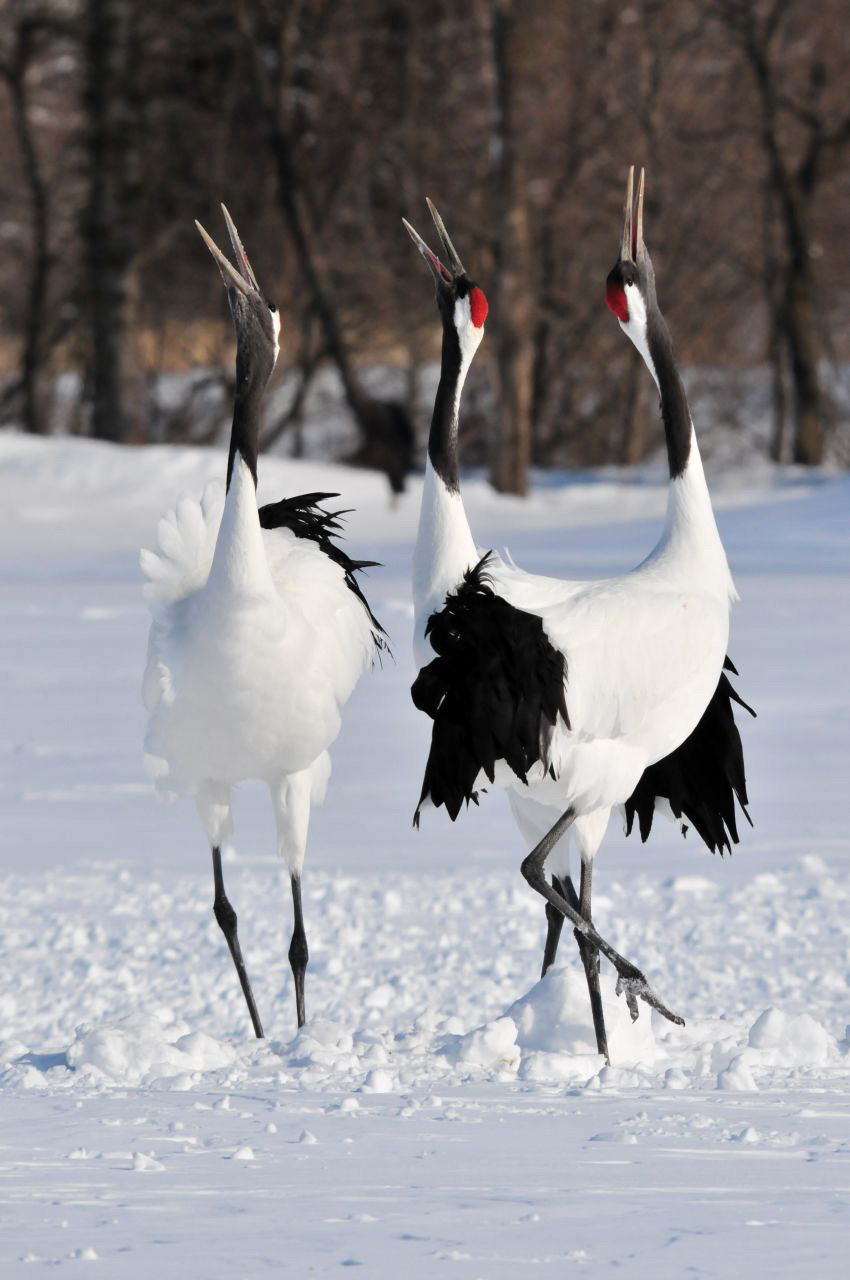
Red-crowned cranes

Over 600 species of bird have been recorded in Japan and more than 250 of these breed. A number of birds are endemic including the Japanese woodpecker (Picus awokera), copper pheasant (Syrmaticus soemmerringii) and Japan's national bird, the green pheasant (Phasianus versicolor). Several species are unique to the smaller islands including the Okinawa rail (Gallirallus okinawae), Izu thrush (Turdus celaenops) and Bonin white-eye (Apalopteron familiare ). Most of the non-endemic birds are shared with China but a few originate in Siberia or south-east Asia.

Large numbers of birds migrate through Japan in spring and autumn including many waders. In winter, several sites are important for swans, geese and cranes.

=== Reptiles and amphibians ===
Japan has about 73 species of reptile of which nearly half are endemic. Sea turtles and highly venomous but non-aggressive sea snakes including the black-banded sea krait occur in warmer waters around southern Japan. Venomous snakes include the mildly venomous tiger keelback, and the more venomous front fanged vipers are the elegant pit viper, Okinawa habu, Tokara habu, hime habu and the mamushi. Many pitviper species, known as habus throughout Japan are endemic to islands in the warmer Ryukyu Islands chain however the mamushi (Gloydius blomhoffii) is found on the main islands. Non-venomous rat snakes found in Japan are the endemic Japanese rat snake, Japanese forest rat snake, Japanese four-lined rat snake, and the king rat snake and beauty rat snake (subspecies Orthriophis taeniurus schmackeri) which in Japan are found only in the warm Ryukyu islands but have much wider distributions on mainland Asia. Three species of odd-scaled snakes are present in the southern islands including the Formosan odd-scaled snake, Japanese odd-scaled snake, and the Amami odd-scaled snake.

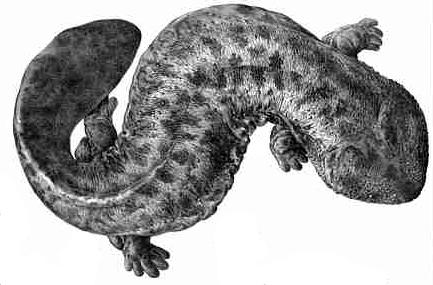
Japanese giant salamander

Lizards include many endemic skink species (especially in the southern islands), the viviparous lizard (found as far north as the island of Hokkaido), and the Okinawa tree lizard (Diploderma polygonatum). Freshwater turtles found in Japan include the endemic Japanese pond turtle, Ryukyu black-breasted leaf turtle. The Chinese box turtle is found only on the southernmost islands of Iriomote and Ishigaki in its Japanese range.

At least two crocodilian species are known to have occurred in the recent geological past of Japan: the Chinese alligator and Toyotamaphimeia.

There are over 40 amphibian species including the Japanese giant salamander (Andrias japonicus), one of the world's largest amphibians. The Asiatic salamander family (Hynobiidae) is particularly well represented; many members of the family are found only in Japan.

=== Fish ===
Over 3,000 types of fish have been recorded in Japan. Important freshwater fish include the ayu (Plecoglossus altivelis), crucian carp (Carassius carassius) and common carp (Cyprinus carpio). The common carp is the ancestor of the well-known domestic koi carp. Small freshwater fish include the pale chub, Japanese chub (Nipponocypris sieboldii) and several species of bitterling including the endangered rosy bitterling. The southern Ryukyu Islands are home to endemic species of colorful freshwater gobies in the genus Stiphodon.

Notable anadromous fish include six species of salmon represented by the Chinook salmon, chum salmon, pink salmon, coho salmon, sockeye salmon, and the cherry salmon (which has several unique freshwater morphs in Japan). Chars in the genus Salvelinus are represented by the white-spotted char (including several unique varieties such as the gogi char), Dolly Varden trout, and the endemic kirikuchi char. The Japanese taimen (Hucho perryi) is the largest fish to enter freshwater in Japan and may reach sizes of up to 2 meters in length. The Japanese taimen is a critically endangered species including the Japanese populations which are restricted to the rivers and surrounding ocean of Hokkaido. Also present is the Japanese dace (Tribolodon hakonensis).

Important saltwater fish include the red sea bream (Pagrus major). Mudskippers are found in warmer areas while coral reefs in the Ryukyu Islands have many fish typical of tropical waters such as parrotfish and anemonefish. The little-known goblin shark (Mitsukurina owstoni) and frilled shark (Chlamydoselachus anguineus) have been recorded from deep waters off Japan.

=== Insects ===
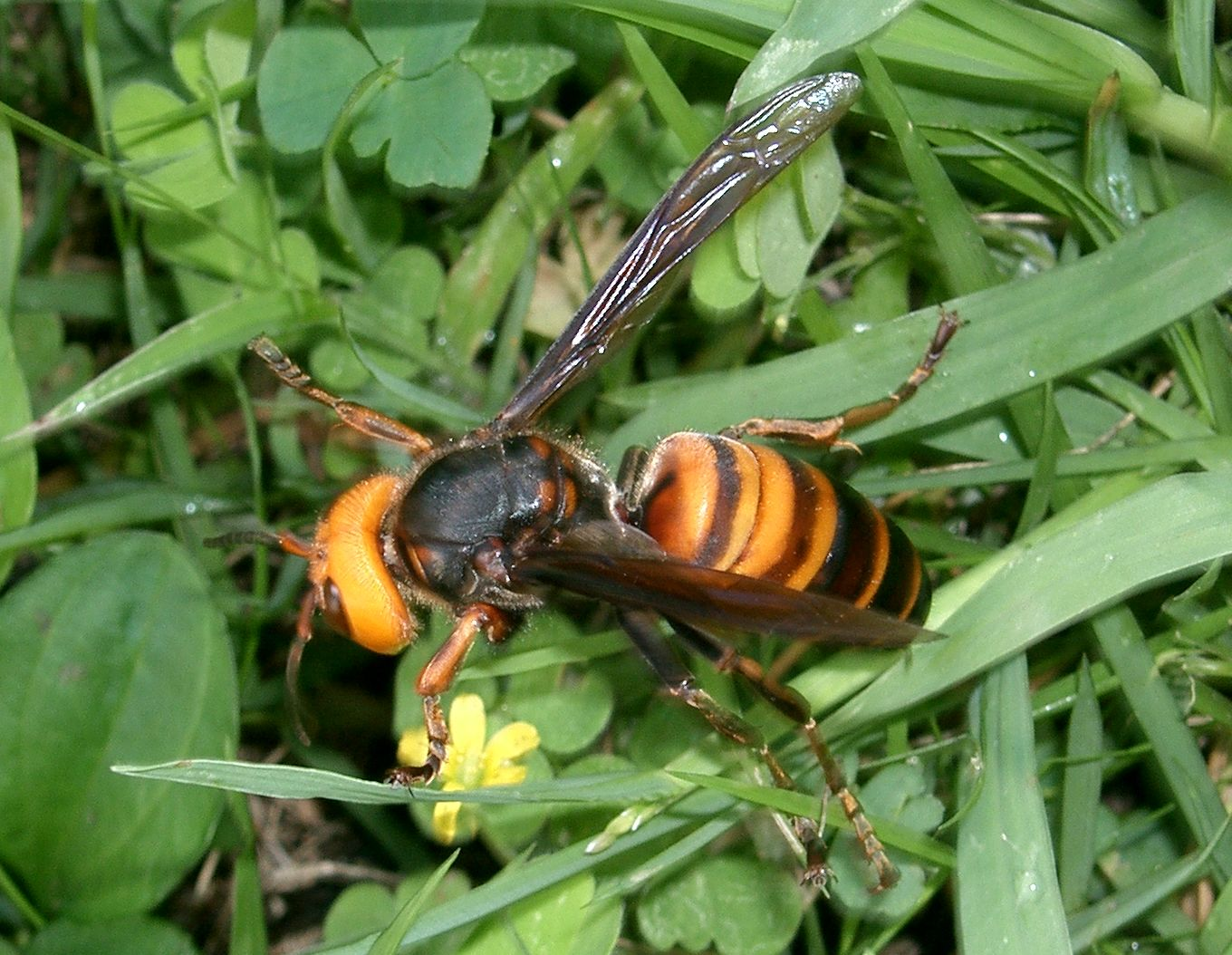
Asian giant hornet, the largest social wasp in the world

Japan has around 300 kinds of butterflies including several of the mainly tropical milkweed butterflies in the Ryukyu Islands. There are around 190 dragonflies including the primitive Epiophlebia superstes. Other well-known insects in Japan include cicadas, crickets, Asian giant hornet and fireflies. Firefly viewing is a popular tourist attraction in some areas.

Some of the butterflies are endangered, and thus added into the Japan Red List. One example is Niphanda fusca, a parasitic butterfly that commonly resides in satoyama. Due to changing ecosystems, this butterfly has become endangered, especially within the past 40 years. It is one of the four species that have disappeared in Shikoku.

=== Molluscs ===
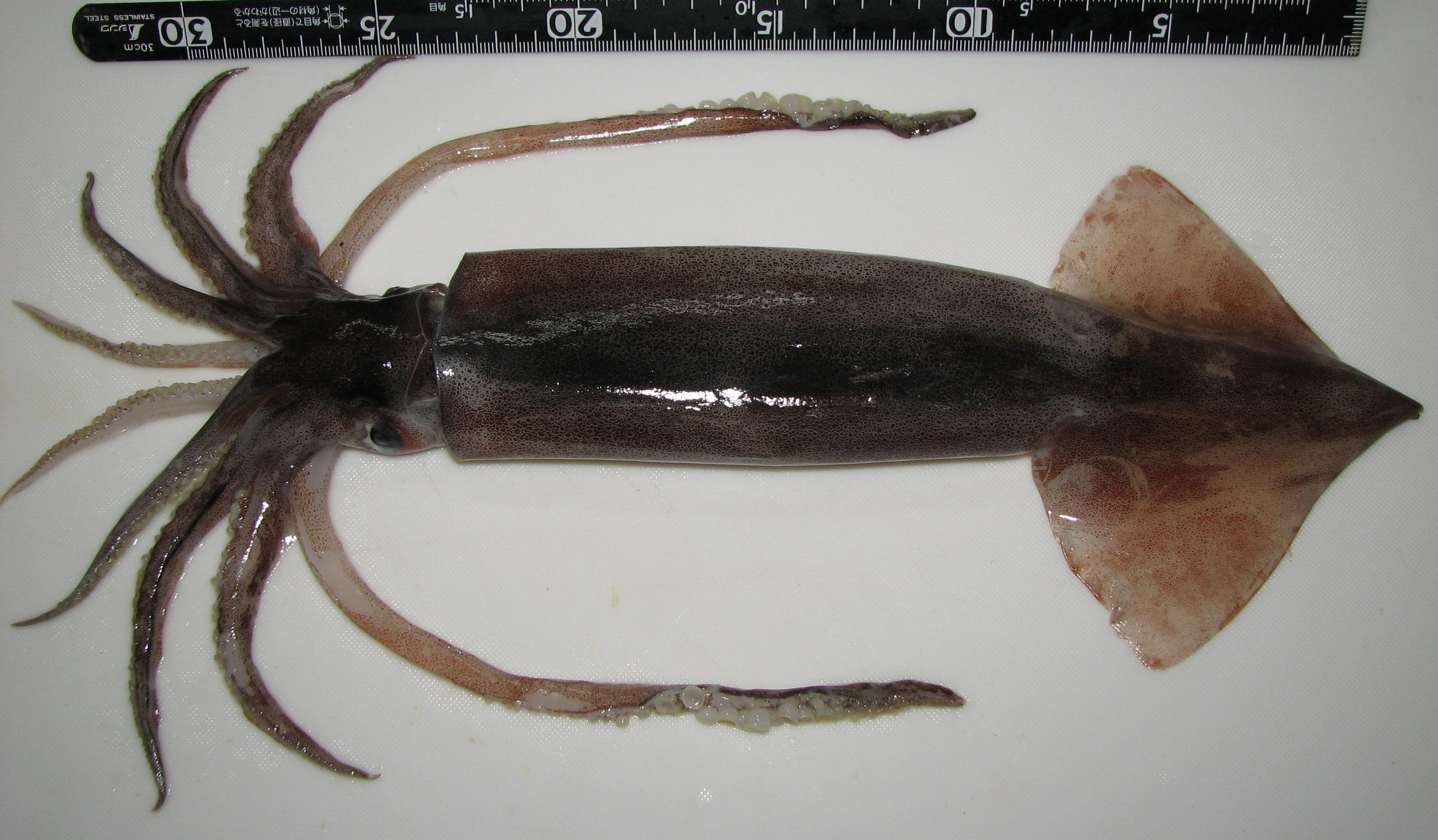
Japanese flying squid

The winter spawning Japanese flying squid are associated with the Kuroshio Current. The eggs and larvae develop during winter in the East China Sea and the adults travel with minimum energy via the Kuroshio Current to the rich northern feeding grounds near northwestern Honshu and Hokkaido.

=== Coral ===
Japan has a number of temperate coral reefs which lie within waters warmed by the Kuroshio Current and its offshoots. The impact of climate change has led to these corals expanding at the expense of seagrasses.

== Flora ==
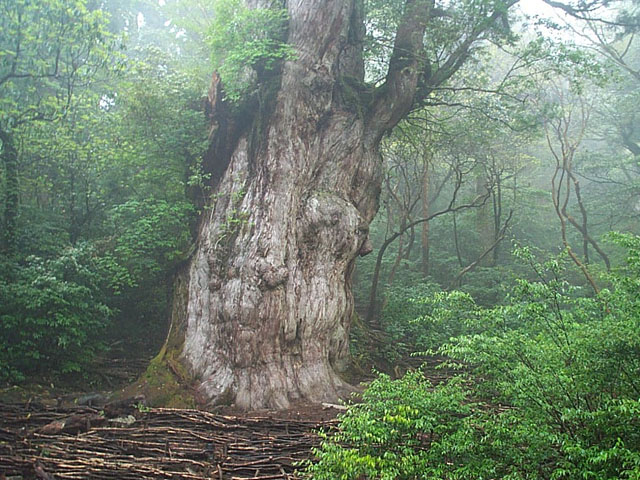
Jōmon Sugi, a large and ancient Japanese red cedar on Yakushima

Around 4,000 to 6,000 species of plants occur naturally in Japan. The vegetation varies widely from subtropical forest in the south to coniferous forest in the north. In the subtropical zone, mangroves, cycads and tree ferns can be found. In the warm-temperate climate of Kyūshū, Shikoku and south-western Honshū, the dominant vegetation is broad-leaved evergreen forest with many oaks. In north Honshū and south-west Hokkaidō the climate is cool-temperate with broad-leaved deciduous trees including Japanese beech (Fagus crenata) and oaks like the jolcham oak (Quercus serrata). Conifers are dominant in much of Hokkaidō and in the mountains of central and northern Honshū with spruces and firs growing. In the highest mountains there is a zone of Arctic–alpine plants including the low-growing Siberian dwarf pine (Pinus pumila).

Conifer plantations have replaced natural forest in many areas. Commonly grown trees include the hinoki cypress (Chamaecyparis obtusa), Japanese red pine (Pinus densiflora), Japanese black pine (Pinus thunbergii), sakaki evergreen (Cleyera japonica) and Japanese red cedar (Cryptomeria japonica). The last is Japan's tallest conifer reaching 40 metres in height.

Bamboo grows abundantly in Japan with around 400 to 500 species including the dwarf bamboos known as sasa and the taller kinds known as take which can reach 20 meters.

Many plants have been introduced to Japan from mainland Asia including important crops like rice and garden plants such as the chrysanthemum. Since the Meiji Restoration, increasing numbers of plants have come from Europe, North America and elsewhere. Native food plants include the water dropwort (Oenanthe javanica) and wasabi (Wasabia japonica).

== Conservation ==
In 1897 Japan passed a law that protects forests for a variety of purposes, including to prevent erosion, protect river sources, and to support fish ecosystems. As of 2023, 12 million hectares are protected. Some fishermen have worked to maintain forests in coastal areas, with coastal waters subsequently having greater fish biodiversity. Japan's Ministry of the Environment has taken several measure to conserve native wildlife such as hunting restrictions, captive breeding programs, and habitat protection and restoration. The feeding of wild animals by humans (esayari) has led to local governments issuing fines and other means to lessen the dependence on humans for food and adverse changes in natural behavior.

== See also ==
- Biota of Tokyo Imperial Palace
