= Ministry of the Environment (Japan) =

Government ministry of Japan

Coordinates: 35.673°N 139.753°E

- 環境省; Kankyōshō

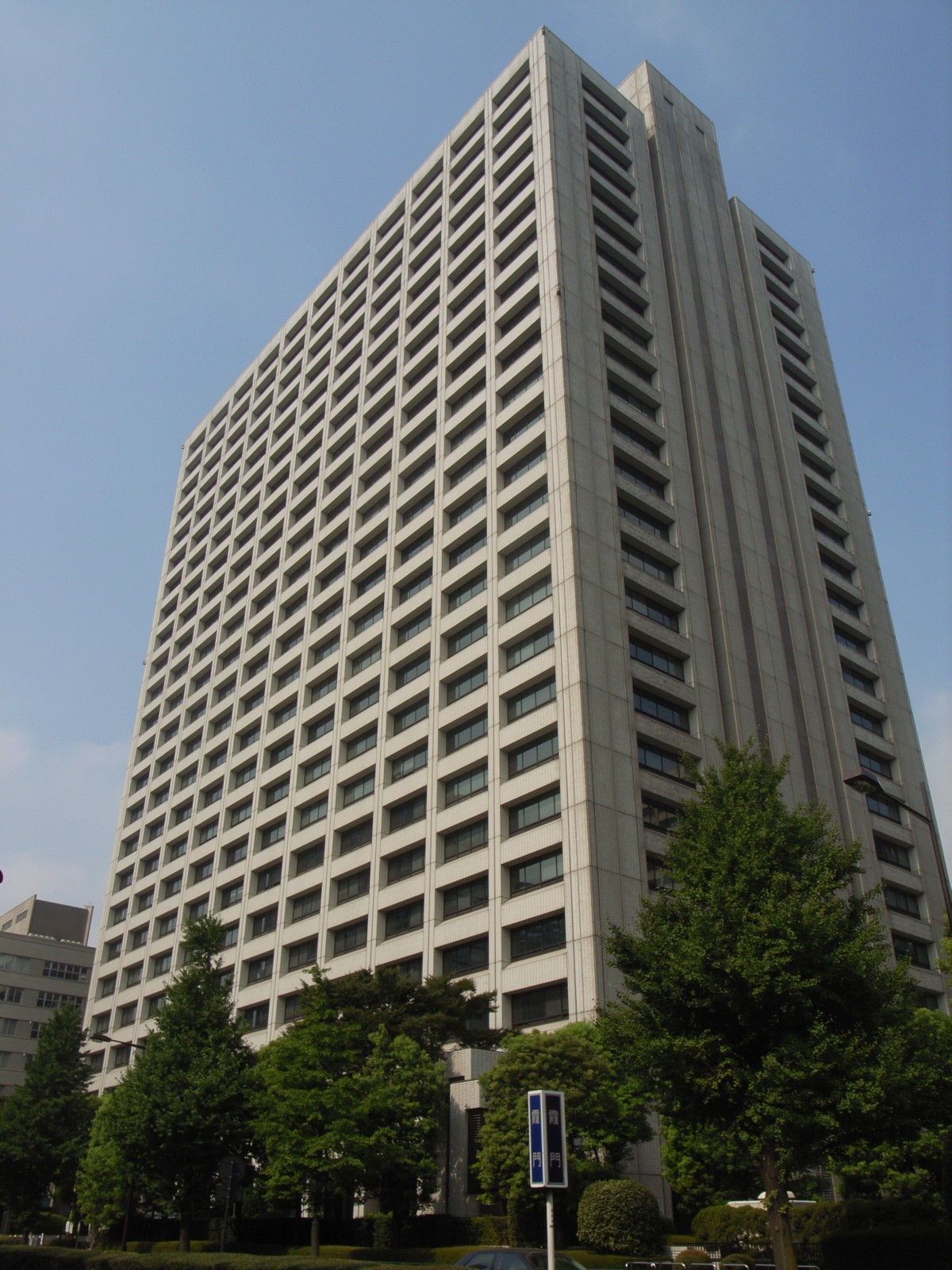

Agency overview
- Jurisdiction: Government of Japan
- Headquarters: Central Gov't Bldg No. 5, 1-2-2 Kasumigaseki, Chiyoda-ku, Tokyo 100-8975, Japan
- Ministers responsible: Hiroyoshi Sasagawa, Minister of the Environment; Yukari Sato, State Minister of the Environment; Hirotaka Ishihara, State Minister of the Environment
- Website: env.go.jp/en

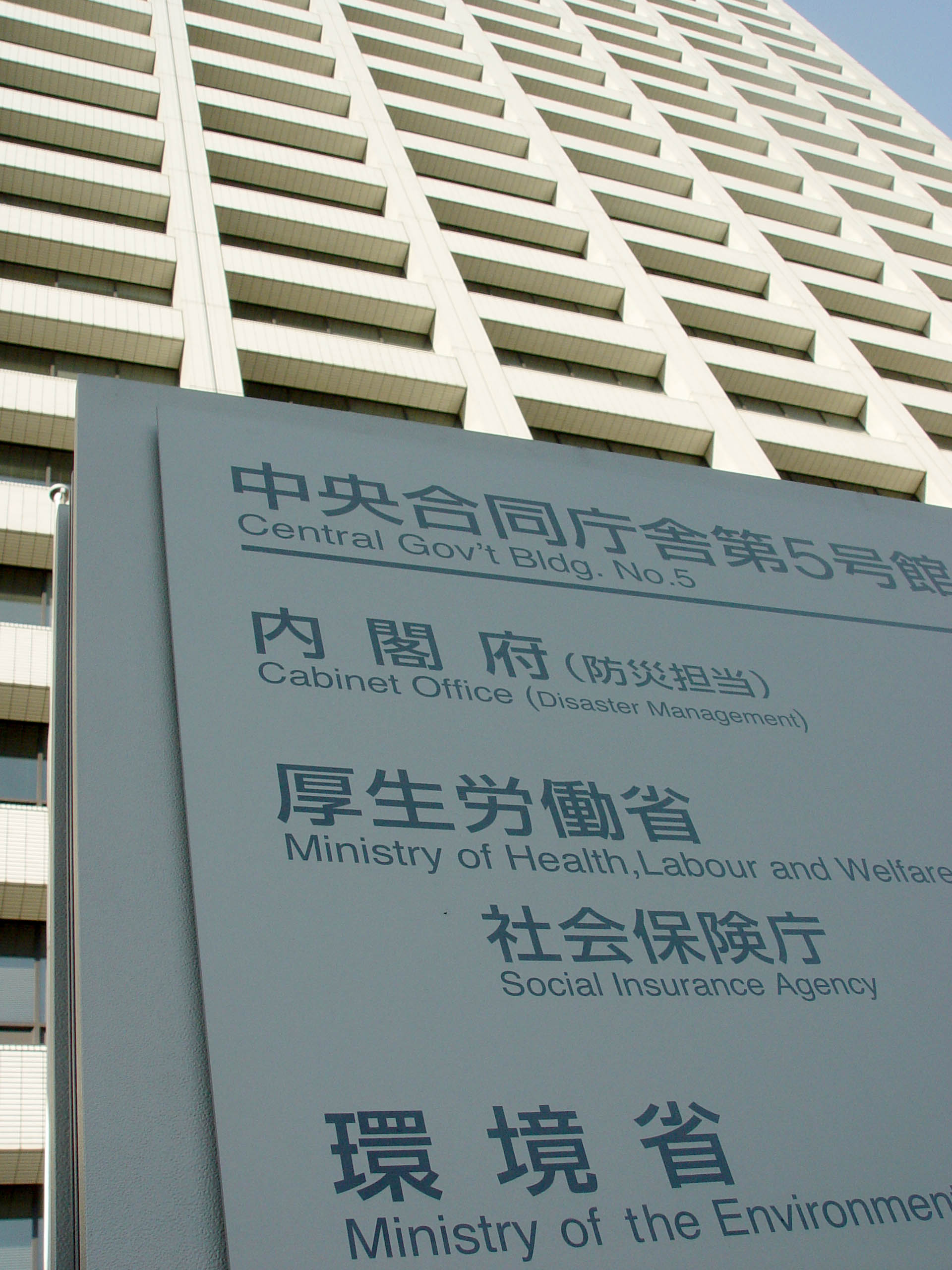
Office building

The Ministry of the Environment (環境省, Kankyō-shō) is a Cabinet-level ministry of the government of Japan responsible for global environmental conservation, pollution control, and nature conservation. The ministry was formed in 2001 from the sub-cabinet level Environmental Agency established in 1971. The Minister of the Environment is a member of the Cabinet of Japan and is chosen by the Prime Minister, usually from among members of the Diet.

In March 2006, the then-Minister of the Environment Yuriko Koike, created a furoshiki cloth to promote its use in the modern world.

In August 2011, the Cabinet of Japan approved a plan to establish a new energy watchdog under the Environment Ministry, and the Nuclear Regulation Authority was founded on September 19, 2012.

== Organization ==
- Minister's Secretariat (大臣官房)
- Office of Environmental Policy (総合環境政策統括官)
- Global Environment Bureau (地球環境局)
- Environment Management Bureau (水・大気環境局)
- Nature Conservation Bureau (自然環境局)
- Environmental Restoration and Resource Circulation Bureau (環境再生・資源循環局)

== Cool Biz ==
The Ministry of the Environment began advocating the Cool Biz campaign in summer 2005 as a means to help reduce electric consumption by limiting use of air conditioning and allowing the wearing of less formal officewear. This idea was proposed by then-Minister of the Environment Yuriko Koike under Prime Minister Junichiro Koizumi.

=== Super Cool Biz ===
Following the Tōhoku earthquake and tsunami in March 2011, the shut down of many nuclear power plants for safety reasons lead to energy shortages. To conserve energy, the government recommended setting air conditioners at 28 degrees Celsius, switching off computers not in use, and called for shifting work hours to the morning and taking more summer vacation than usual. The government then launched a Super Cool Biz campaign to encourage workers to wear outfits appropriate for the office yet cool enough to endure the summer heat. Polo shirts and trainers are allowed, while jeans and sandals are also acceptable under certain circumstances. June 1 marked the start of the Environment Ministry's campaign, with full-page newspaper ads and photos of ministry workers smiling rather self-consciously at their desks wearing polo shirts and colorful Okinawa kariyushi shirts. The campaign was repeated in 2012 and 2013.

== See also ==
- Environmental issues in Japan
