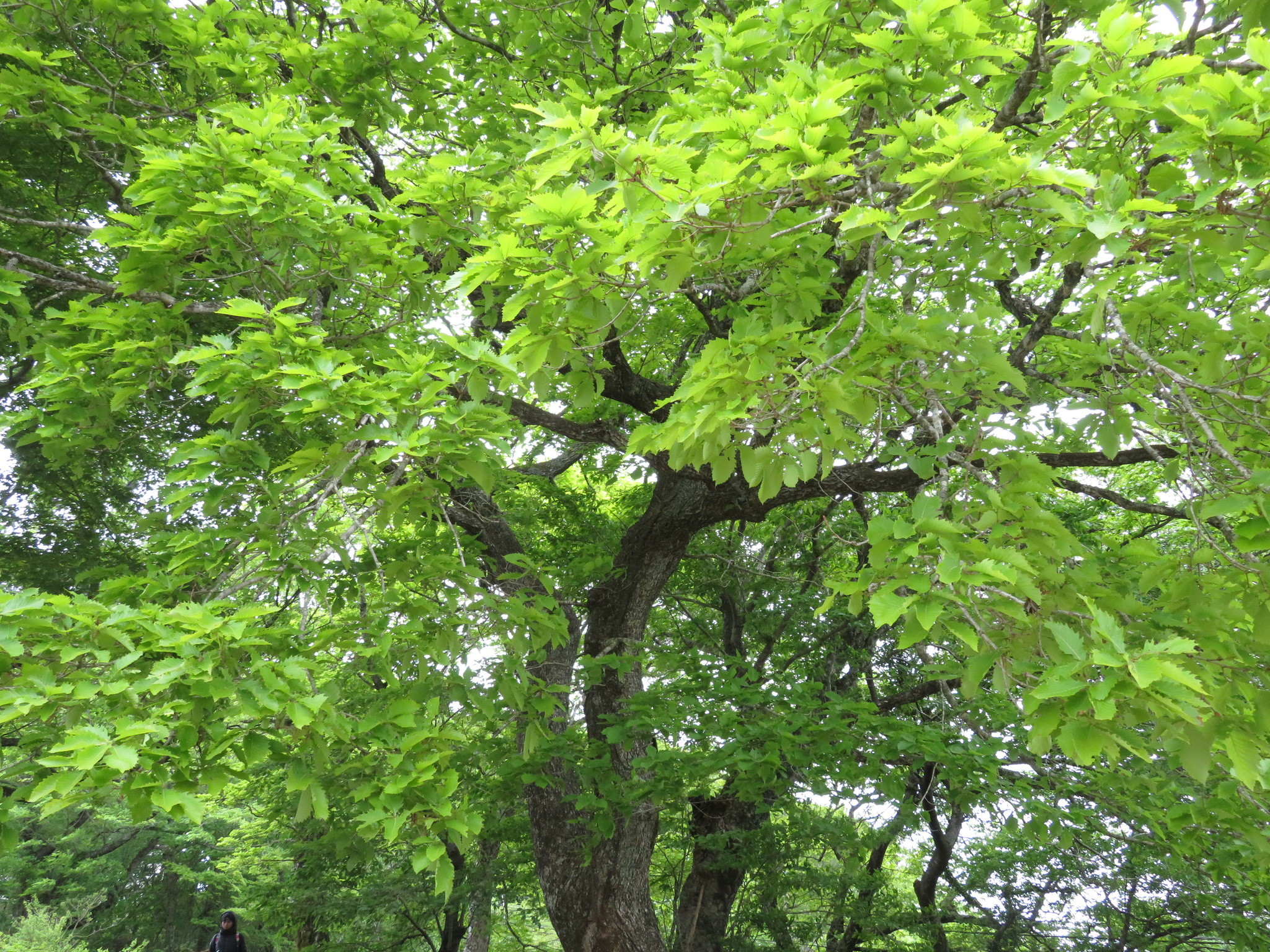
- Quercus crispula in Ibaraki Prefecture

Scientific classification
- Kingdom: Plantae
- Clade: Tracheophytes
- Clade: Angiosperms
- Clade: Eudicots
- Clade: Rosids
- Order: Fagales
- Family: Fagaceae
- Genus: Quercus
- Species: Q. crispula

Binomial name
- Quercus crispula Blume, 1851

Synonyms
- Quercus mongolica subsp. crispula Blume; Quercus mongolica var. grosseserrata (Bl.) Rehd. & Wils. Quercus mongolica subsp. crispula (Blume) Menitsky (and H.Ohashi)

= Quercus crispula =

Water Oak

Species of tree

Quercus crispula, commonly known as 'water oak' (Japanese: 水楢, Hepburn: mizunara), Japanese oak and Mongolian oak, is a deciduous broad-leaved tree of the genus Quercus. Quercus mongolica var. crispula, it is considered a variety of Quercus mongolica by some authorities, and is widely distributed in Northeast Asia from Sakhalin to southern Japan, and parts of Russia, Korea, and China. It is often colocated with Fagus crenata (Japanese beech) and Acer mono (Painted maple) in dense deciduous forests. The nuts can be eaten. The wood is highly valued for making whisky and is also used for furniture and construction. The outer bark has medicinal properties.

== Description ==
Quercus crispula trees reach 9 to 18 meters (30 to 59 ft) in height, sometimes reaching 27 meters (89 ft) with a canopy spread of 7.5 to 17 meters (25 to 56 ft). Trunks have a diameter up to 1.5 meters (4 ft 11 in). The leaves are dark green lighter green below and glabrous. Leaves are tapered obovate to obobate-oblong that are 10 to 20 centimeters (3.9 to 7.9 in) in length with 7-10 broad coarse serrated teeth that are more wavy than a typical oak. Flowers of about 5 centimeters (2.0 in) in length bloom in May–June, and the acorns ripen in the fall. Male flowers are yellow-green and female flowers are reddish. Abundant acorns grow while the trees are still rather young. Autumn colors are red or golden brown. The average age of Q. crispula is 368 years with a maximum age of 772 years.

Compared to the continental Quercus mongolica, Q. crispula has a straighter trunk and starts growing later in the spring so late frosts are less detrimental. Because of its winter hardiness, it is a popular import to Finland. It grows in hardiness zones 5-8. Q. crispula is wind-pollinated, and monoecious. It lives to be 200-300 years old.

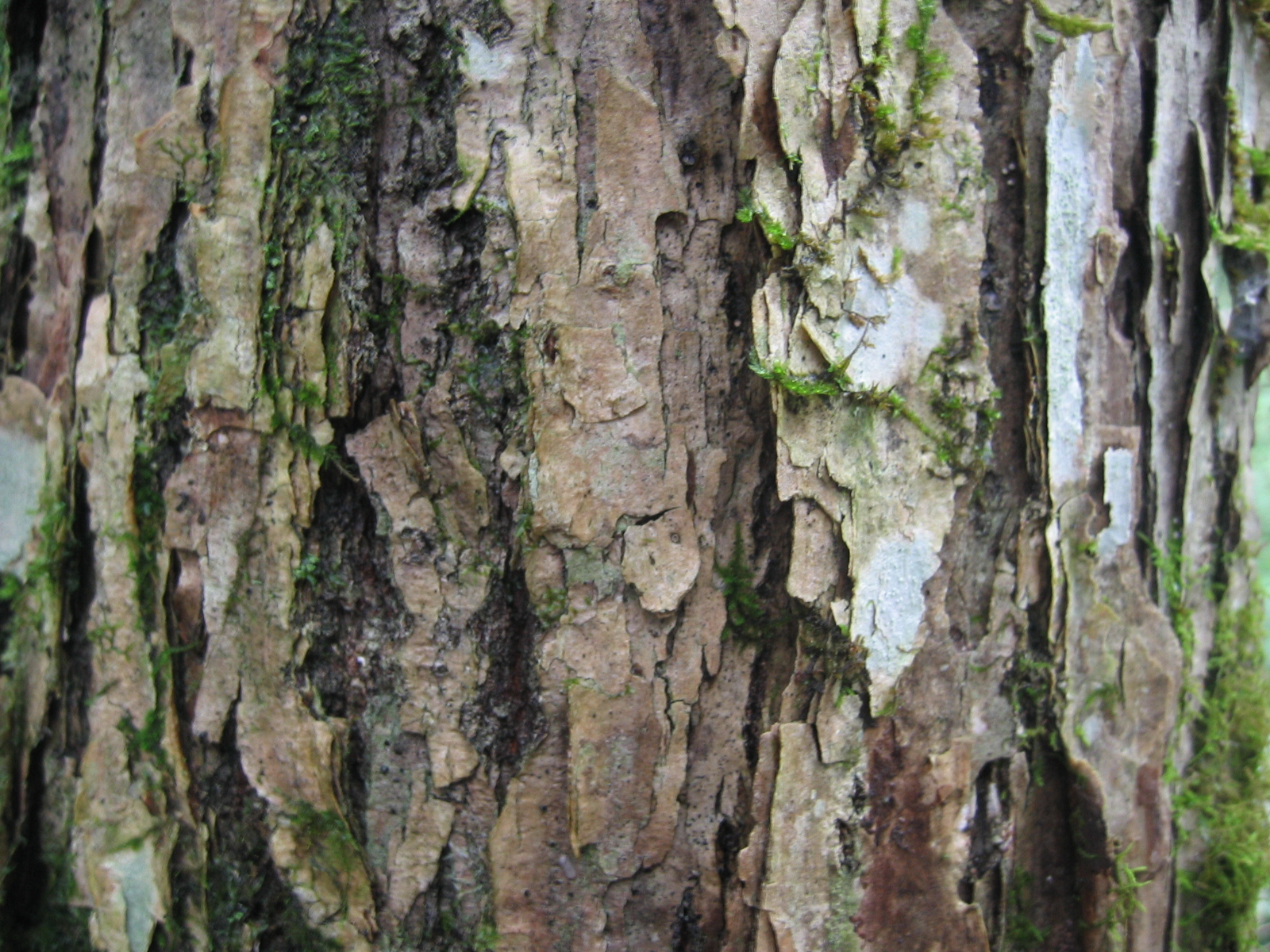
Bark

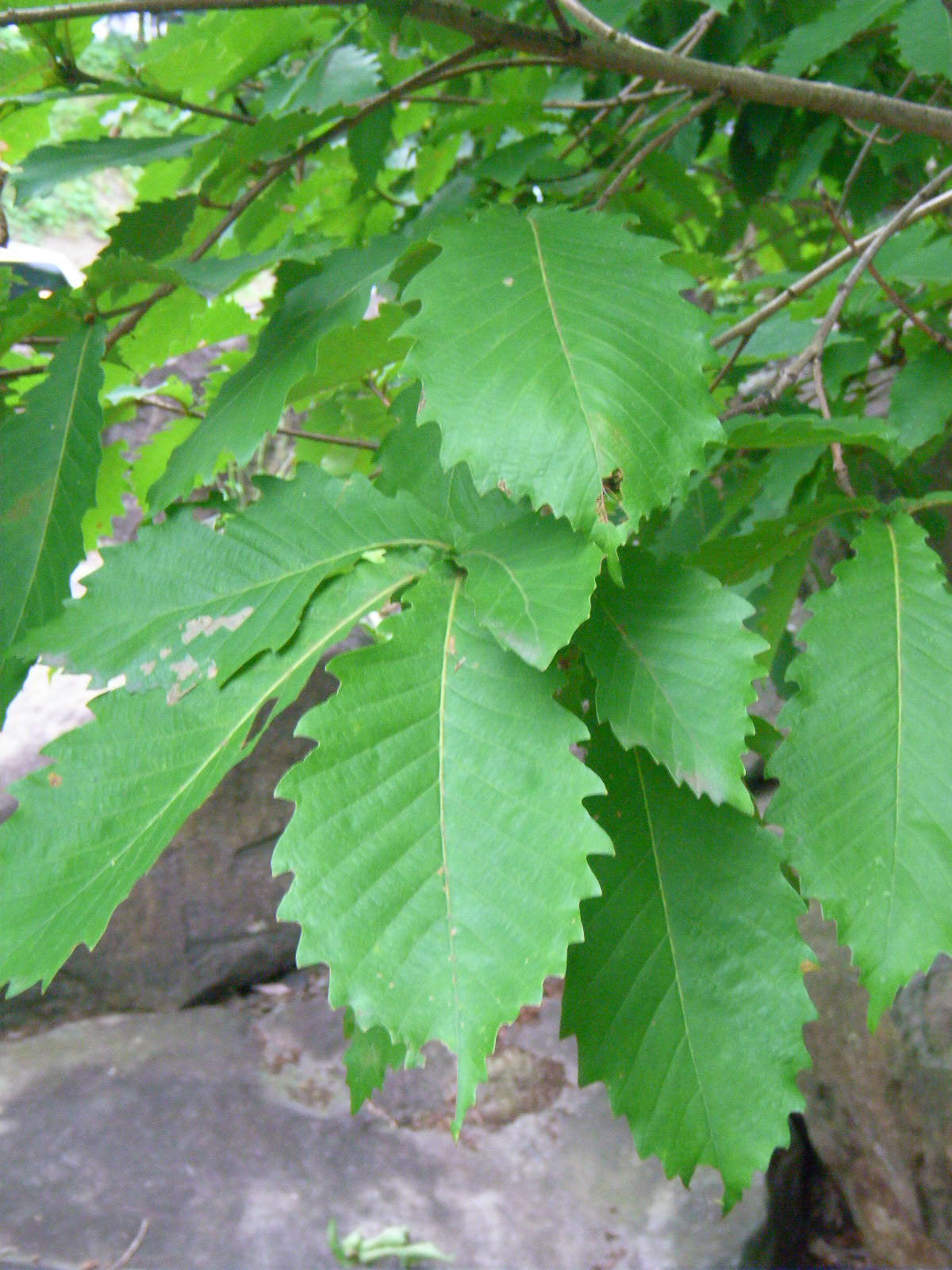
Leaves

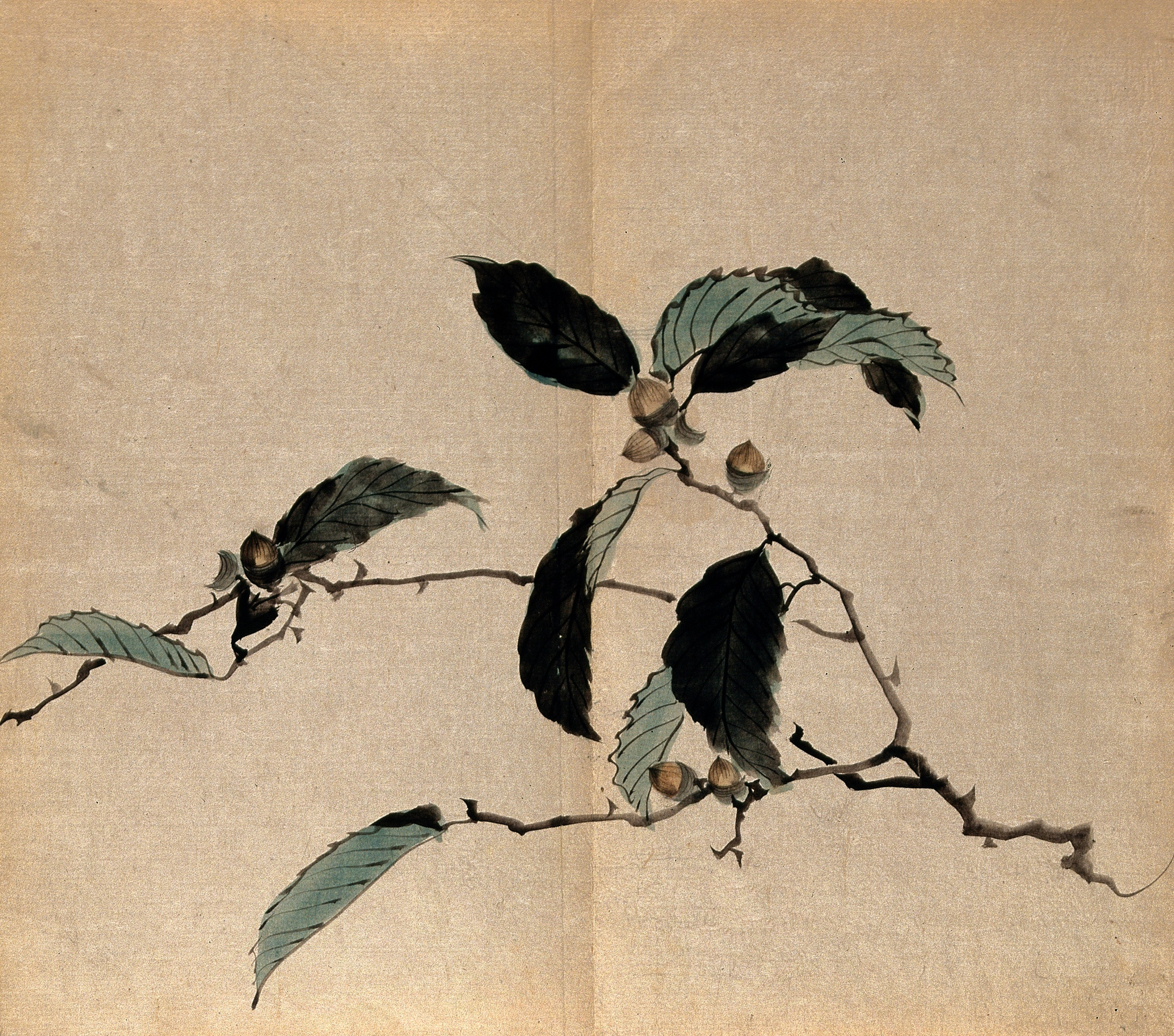
Leaves and acorns

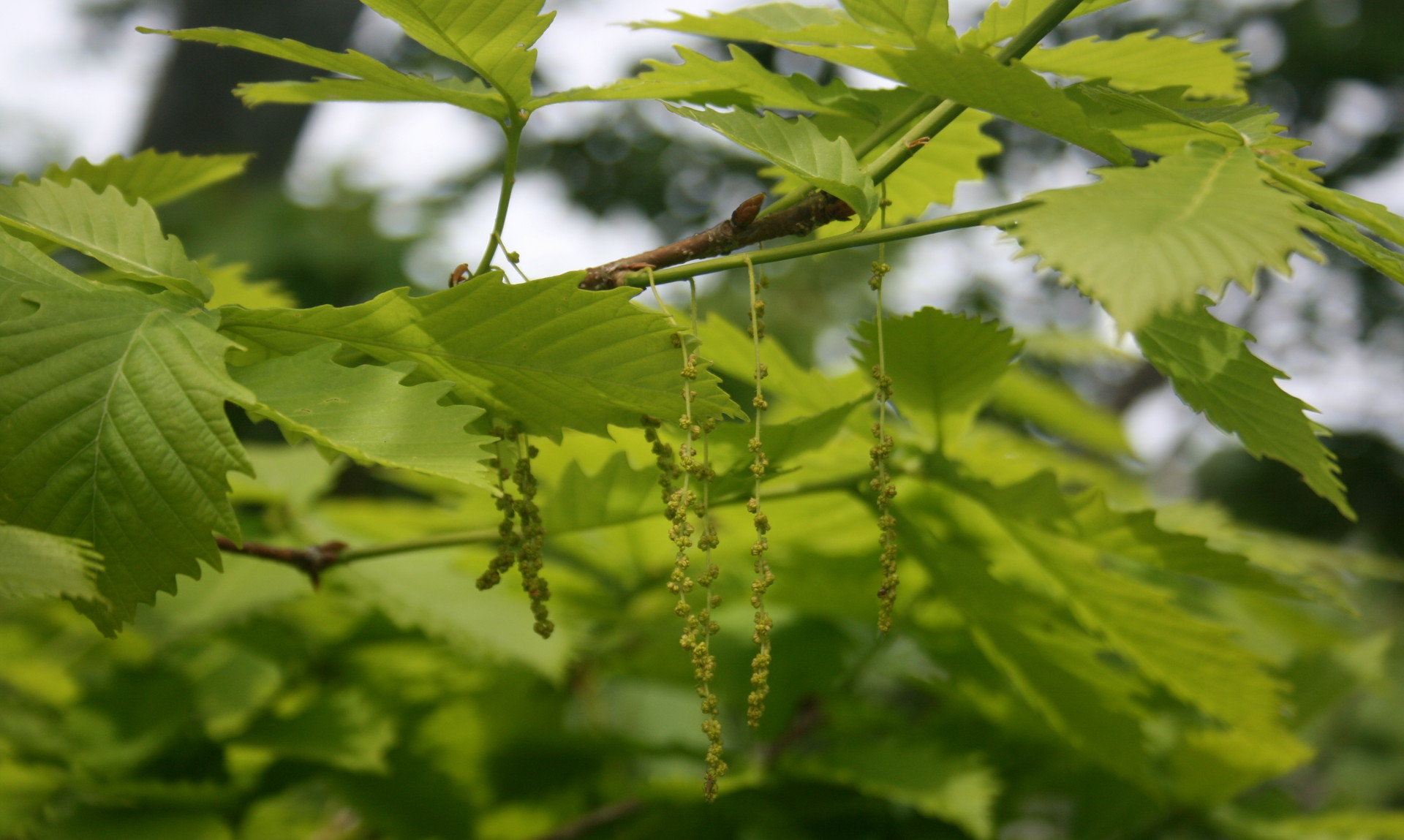
Flowers

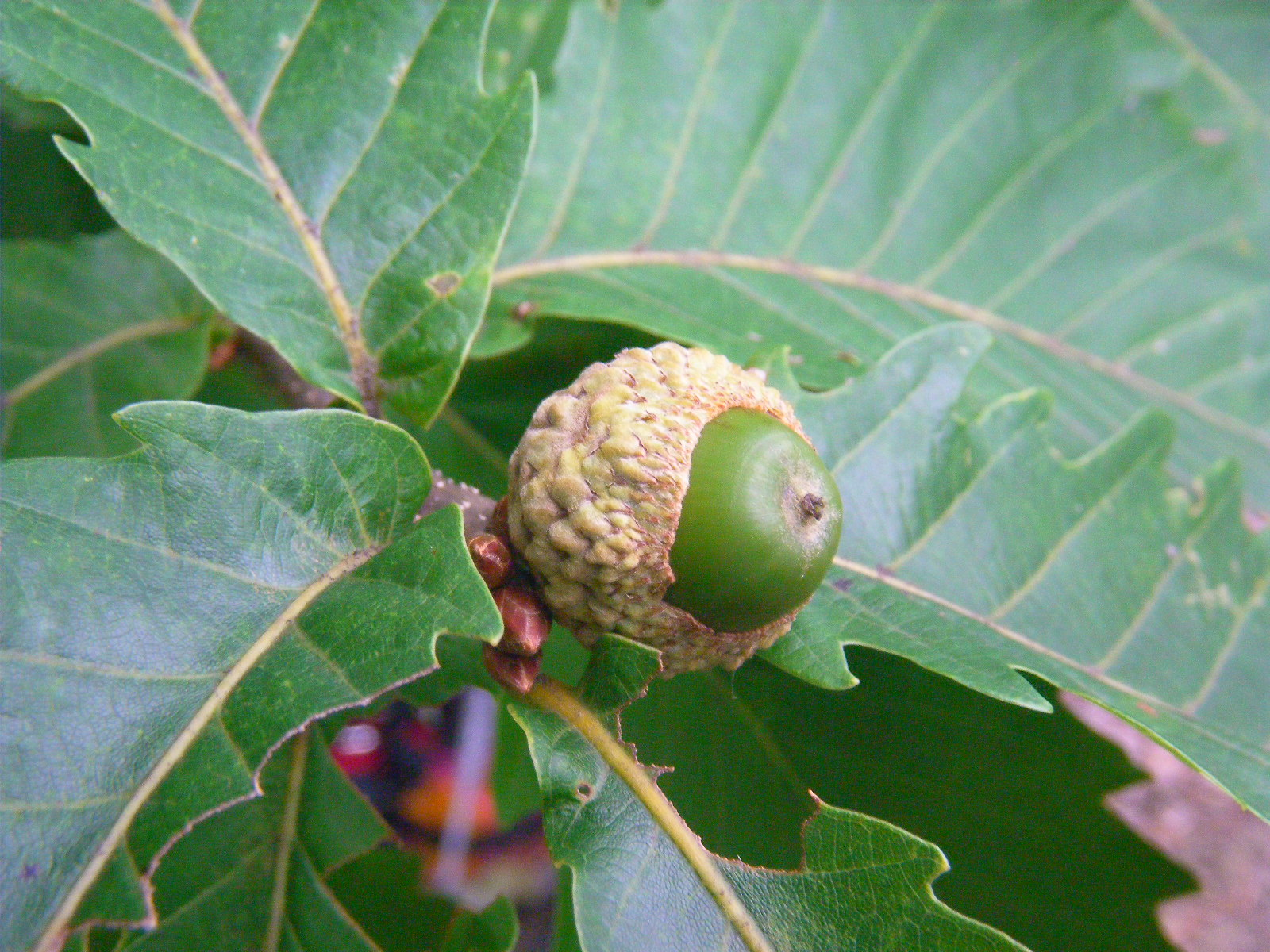
Immature fruit

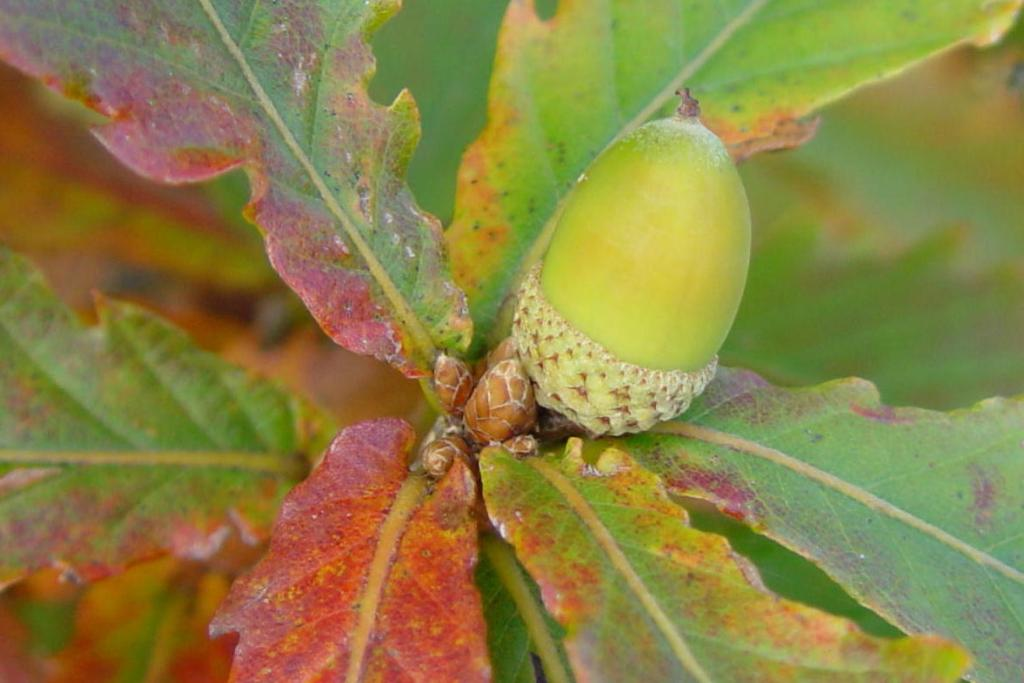
Mature fruit

== Taxonomy ==
Quercus crispula Blume was first scientifically described by Carl Ludwig Blume in 1851. Some authorities consider Q. crispula a variety of Quercus mongolica—var. crispula (Mongolian oak), while others consider it a separate species, Q. crispula. Another scientific name used is Quercus mongolica var. grosseserrata.

The common name used in the whisky distilling business is the Japanese name mizunara (水楢), lit. 'water oak'. Other common names are Mongolian oak and Japanese oak.

=== Etymology ===
Crispula is the feminine singular form of the Latin adjective crispulus, meaning "curly" or "crimped".

== Distribution and habitat ==
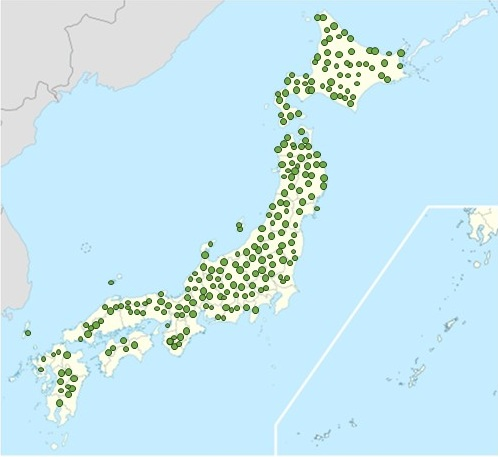
Quercus crispula native distribution map in Japan

Quercus crispula is native to all of Japan's main islands and also on Sakhalin Island, the Kuril Islands, Amur, Khabarovsk, Korea, Manchuria, and Primorsky Krai. It is often colocated with Fagus crenata (Japanese beech) and Acer mono (Painted maple). All three species function as canopy trees, with F. crenata being dominant. In parts of its range, other deciduous trees often found with Q. crispula include: Fagus japonica, Magnolia obovata, Fraxinus lanuginosa, Acer japonicum, Quercus serrata, and Carpinus laxiflora. Q. crispula prefers a colder climate than the closely related Quercus serrata and Quercus acutissima. It grows naturally from the mountains of Japan to the subalpine zone. Along with beech, it is one of the main tree species of deciduous broad-leaved forests in Japan, preferring slightly brighter places than beech.

Quercus dentata (Qd) (Japanese Emperor Oak) cannot tolerate the extreme cold of northern Hokkaido, but Q. crispula (Qc) can. In more southerly parts of Hokkaido, Q. dentata lives in coastal areas while Q. crispula tends to live more inland. In the more northern parts of the island, these two species have experienced introgression and they are interfertile, producing shoots that grow and can reproduce; resulting in a coastal Qc ecotype wih Qd-like traits. The coastal Qc are intermediary between the two parent species in genotypes and phenotypes. There have been conflicting studies about whether Q. crispula had one lineage that migrated northward from southern Japan or that one plus another one that migrated southward from northern Hokkaido. Genetic studies show that the southern lineage specimens only migrated north to the Oshima Peninsula, the very southern tip of Hokkaido, after the Last Glacial Maximum (LGM), more than 20,000 years ago. The other lineage stayed in central and northern Hokkaido and admixture, resulting in multiple lineages in Hokkaido.

== Ecology ==
Acronicta catocaloida, which feeds on Q. crispula

Quercus crispula is not generally subjected to serious insect or disease attacks, but can be a victim of leaf miners. About 84 percent of seedlings die within two years, most under or near the canopy and most from herbivorey by lepidopteran larva. At least seven species in the genus Phyllonorycter feed on Q. crispula: P. acutissimae, P. similis, P. cretata, P. pseudolautella, P. pygmaea, P. mongolicae, and P. matsudai. Other species that feed on Q. crispula are: Caloptilia mandschurica, Caloptilia sapporella, and Acronicta catocaloida. Q. crispula refoliates at a faster rate after insect defoliation than Fagus crenata.

Like many other oaks, Quercus crispula reproduction involves a pattern of masting, which is characterized by significant variation in acorn production from year to year. Heavy masting occurred in alternating years but 1995 this pattern became disrupted, apparently due to climate change. synchrony occurs between individual trees within a stand of trees. The weevils in the genus Curculio infest 25-75 percent of the mature acorns: C. sikkimensis, C. dentipes, and C. distinguendus, disrupting tree reproduction. These weevils have a prolonged diapause of two years or longer. The weevil species do not emerge in the same year; each species has its own emergence timing.

== Cultivation ==
Quercus crispula grows best grown in rich, moist, well-drained loams, including sandy loams, in full sun. It tolerates drought, clay soil, and dry soil well. Soils should have a pH balance that is mildly acid, neutral or mildly alkaline. It does not grow well in full shade, but tolerates some shade. Encouraging rapid tree growth does not always enhance quality, but practicing long-rotation forestry does.

== Uses ==
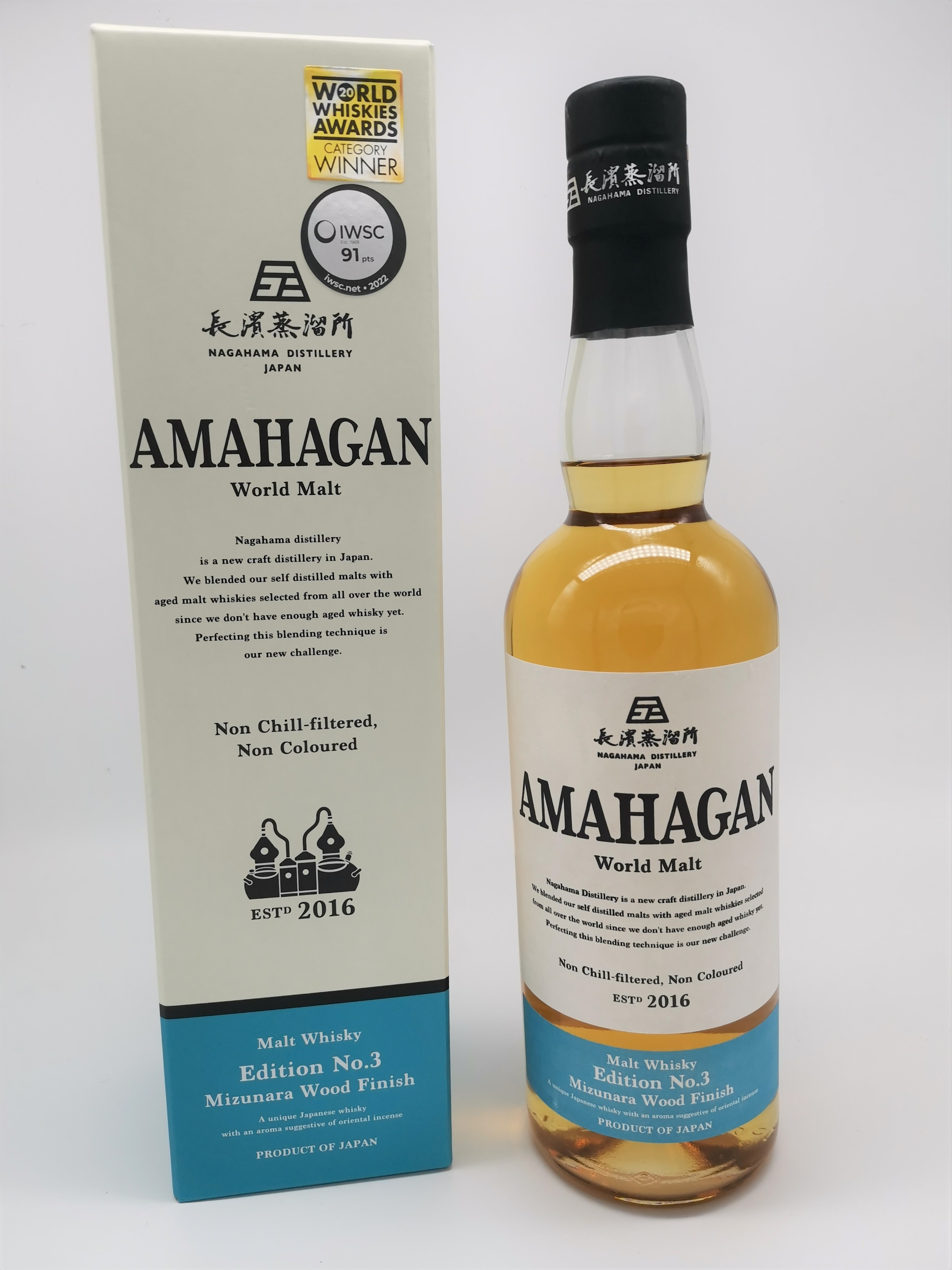
Amahagan (Nagahama spelled backwards) mizunara whisky

Quercus crispula is most widely known outside Japan for its use in barrels to age Japanese and Scotch whisky. The wood is expensive, has many twists, has fewer tyloses than other oaks, has poor watertightness, and its high water content requires a two-year drying time; all making it difficult for coopers to work with. It can be hard to obtain and is expensive. Despite these issues, Q. crispula wood has received international acclaim as a material that can brew a delicate flavor and unique aroma completely different from other oak barrels. Whisky connoisseur David Broom describes the aroma and taste as most reminiscent of aloeswood and similar to sandalwood with hint of coconut, camphor mintiness, and cedar. The link between the aroma of mizunara and temples is often referred to as "temple smell". The reason is the wood has some of the same molecules as fungus-infected aloeswood, which is found in species of the genus Aquilaria. Aloeswood is also used in production of temple incense; hence the similarity. Q. crispula is also used in some distillery washbacks. The most prized Q. crispula trees for barrel making come from Hokkaido, where there are still virgin forests. Hokkaido's oak trees are exported because of the quality and taste these oaks impart to whisky making. Hokkaido is well-suited to making whisky because of the long and cold winters, warm summers, peat, and many Q. crispula trees.

=== Other uses ===
In addition to distillery barrels, the wood is used in high-end furniture and building materials. In particular, Hokkaido varieties are considered to be of good quality. Q. crispula wood and chips also make an excellent host bed for the cultivation of shiitake mushrooms.

Extract made from the outer bark of Q. crispula has outstanding effectiveness against the parasite parasite Toxoplasma gondii, which infects warm-blooded animals and causes toxoplasmosis. The agents in Q. crispula that enable this are three pentacyclic triterpenoids: 29-norlupane-3,20-dione, oleanolic acid acetate, and ursolic acid acetate.

During the Jōmon period, nuts (acorns, chestnuts, and horse chestnuts) were important as a preserved food for winter, especially in the eastern part of Japan, and were stored in underground pits. The acorns of Q. crispula contain astringent tannins and cannot be eaten as they are, but must be processed to become edible.

== See also ==
- Kodama (spirit), Japanese spirits that inhabit trees
- Protected Forests (Japan)
