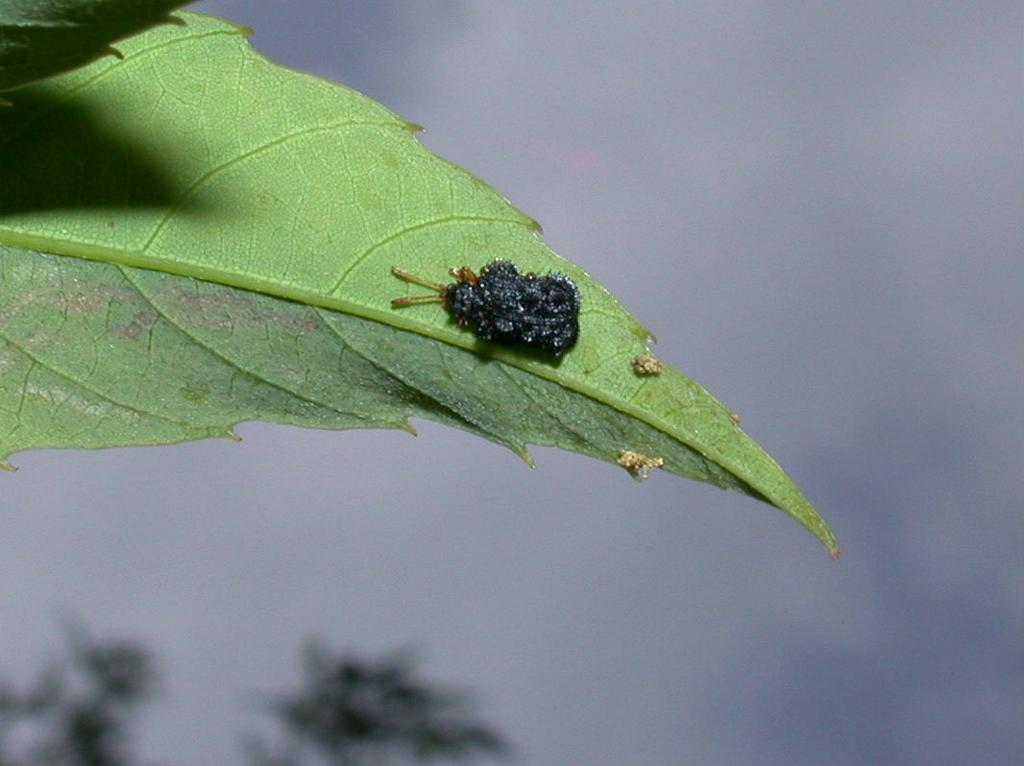

Scientific classification
- Kingdom: Animalia
- Phylum: Arthropoda
- Class: Insecta
- Order: Coleoptera
- Suborder: Polyphaga
- Infraorder: Cucujiformia
- Family: Chrysomelidae
- Genus: Dactylispa
- Species: D. subquadrata

Binomial name
- Dactylispa subquadrata (Baly, 1874)

Synonyms
- Hispa subquadrata Baly, 1874; Dactylispa (Platypriella) subquadrata australis Chen & T’an, 1964; Dactylispa adstricta Weise, 1922

= Dactylispa subquadrata =

Species of beetle

Dactylispa subquadrata is a species of beetle of the family Chrysomelidae. It is found in China (Hunan, Jiangsu, Yunnan), Japan and Korea.

== Life history ==
The recorded host plants for this species are Castanea crenata, Castanopsis cuspidata, Quercus acutissima, Quercus glauca, Quercus mongolica grosseserrata, Quercus serrata and Quercus variabilis.
