= Phyllonorycter acutissimae =

Scientific classification
- Domain: Eukaryota
- Kingdom: Animalia
- Phylum: Arthropoda
- Class: Insecta
- Order: Lepidoptera
- Family: Gracillariidae
- Genus: Phyllonorycter
- Species: P. acutissimae

Binomial name
- Phyllonorycter acutissimae (Kumata, 1963)

Synonyms
- Lithocolletis acutissimae Kumata, 1963

Species of moth

Phyllonorycter acutissimae is a moth of the family Gracillariidae. It is known from Japan (the islands of Hokkaidō, Honshū, Kyūshū and Shikoku) and Korea.

The larvae feed on Castanea crenata, Quercus acutissima, Quercus aliena, Quercus crispula, Quercus mongolica, Quercus serrata and Quercus variabilis. They mine the leaves of their host plant.
