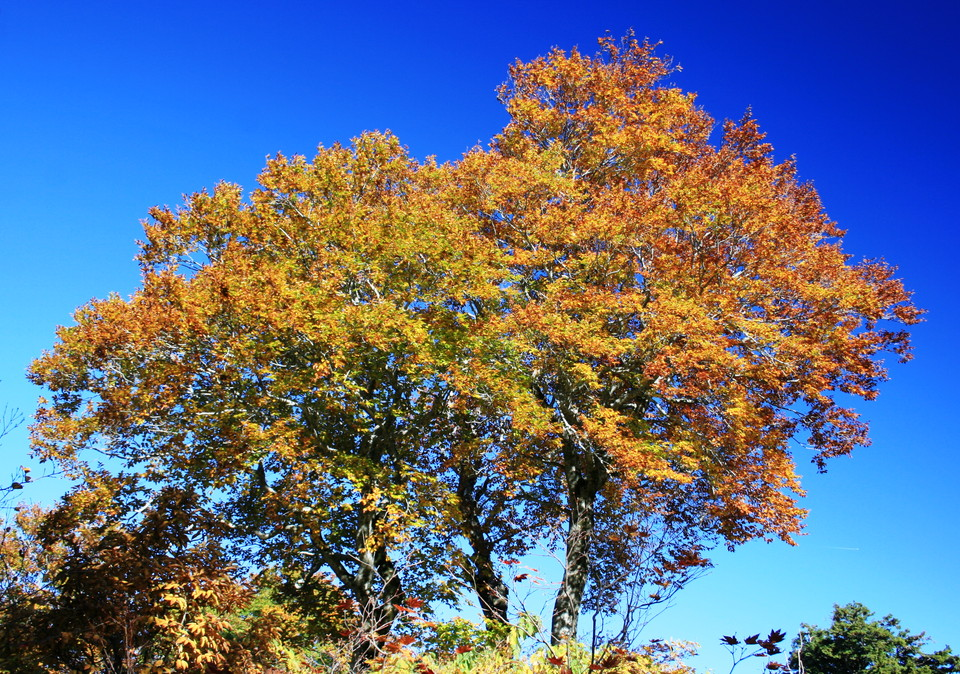
- Fagus crenata in Toyama Prefecture during autumn

Conservation status
- Least Concern (IUCN 3.1)

Scientific classification
- Kingdom: Plantae
- Clade: Tracheophytes
- Clade: Angiosperms
- Clade: Eudicots
- Clade: Rosids
- Order: Fagales
- Family: Fagaceae
- Genus: Fagus
- Species: F. crenata

Binomial name
- Fagus crenata Blume, 1851

Synonyms
- Fagus ferruginea (invalid); Fagus sieboldii

= Fagus crenata =

Japanese beech

Species of beech

Fagus crenata, buna (Japanese: ブナ), known as Siebold's beech, or Japanese beech, is a species of deciduous tree in the family Fagaceae. It is a tall dense hardwood that is only native to Japan. The first written record of this tree in the Western world was in 1830 and it was scientifically described in 1851. It is a high canopy tree and is the dominant tree in most of its range; often colocated with Quercus crispula (Note: Quercus crispula used to be known as Quercus mongolica (Japanese oak), var. grosseserrata.) (Japanese oak) and Acer mono (Painted maple). Nuts, seeds, oil, and young leaves can be eaten but care must be exercised due to toxins. It is also used for firewood, furniture, construction, and shade. Climate change is having a negative impact on this tree.

== Description ==
Fagus crenata reaches 35 meters (115 ft) in height with a crown that is rounded with thick low branches and the bark is smooth and light-grey to white with mottled pale gray, dark gray, and greenish-gray. Buttress roots often grow underneath the tree. Surface roots may also develop to obtain more oxygen for growth and fruiting. The simple leaves are arranged alternately along the branch, growing 7.5 to 15 centimeters (3.0 to 5.9 in) long and 2.5 to 8 centimeters (0.98 to 3.15 in) wide. The leaves are serrated and obovate. They are broadest towards the base and have 7-11 pairs of veins. In fall the leaves are rusty red, yellow, and brown. The average age of F. crenata is 233 years. The oldest tree is one found on Okushiri Island at 374 years old.

The nut is 3-winged and has a short thick stalk, 15 millimeters (0.6 in) long and is inside a spiny husk. The nuts are edible when ripe but are toxic to humans if eaten raw, due to saponic glycoside causing stomach problems. There are flattened green whiskers at the base of the husk of the nut. Seeds are dispersed by synzoochory via rodents and birds. The flowers are small, wind-pollinated, and monoecious and allogamous. Its growth rate is slow. F. crenata tolerates acid, neutral, and alkaline soils but grows best in well-drained loamy and sandy soil. While it can grow in deep shade, it prefers full sun and hot summers.

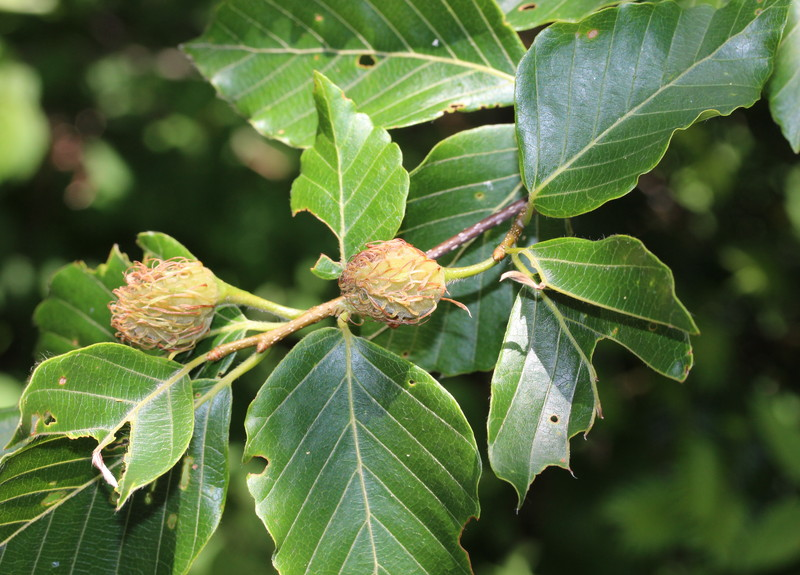
Fruits of F.crenata in Mount Ibuki, Gifu Prefecture

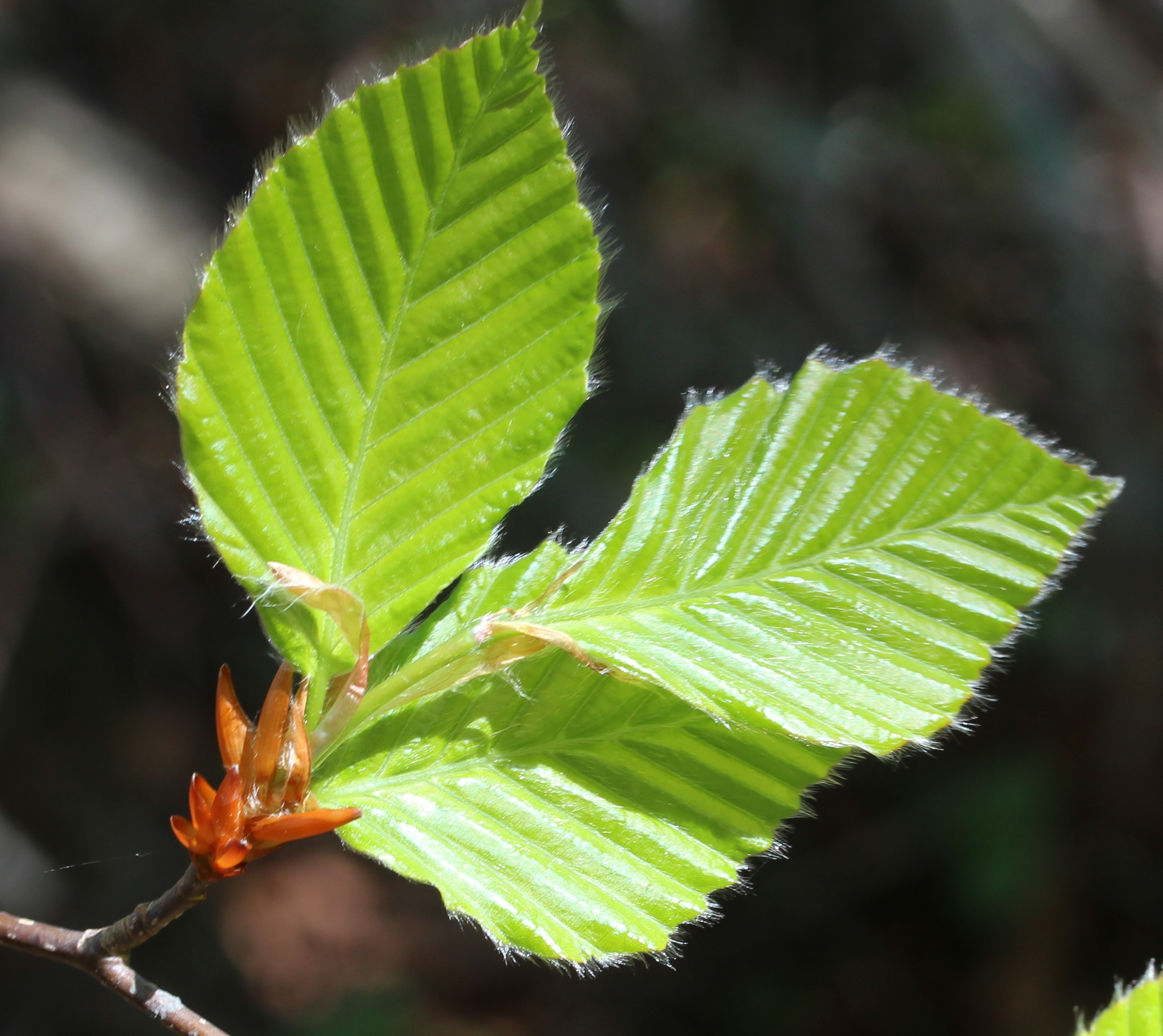
Young leaves, front

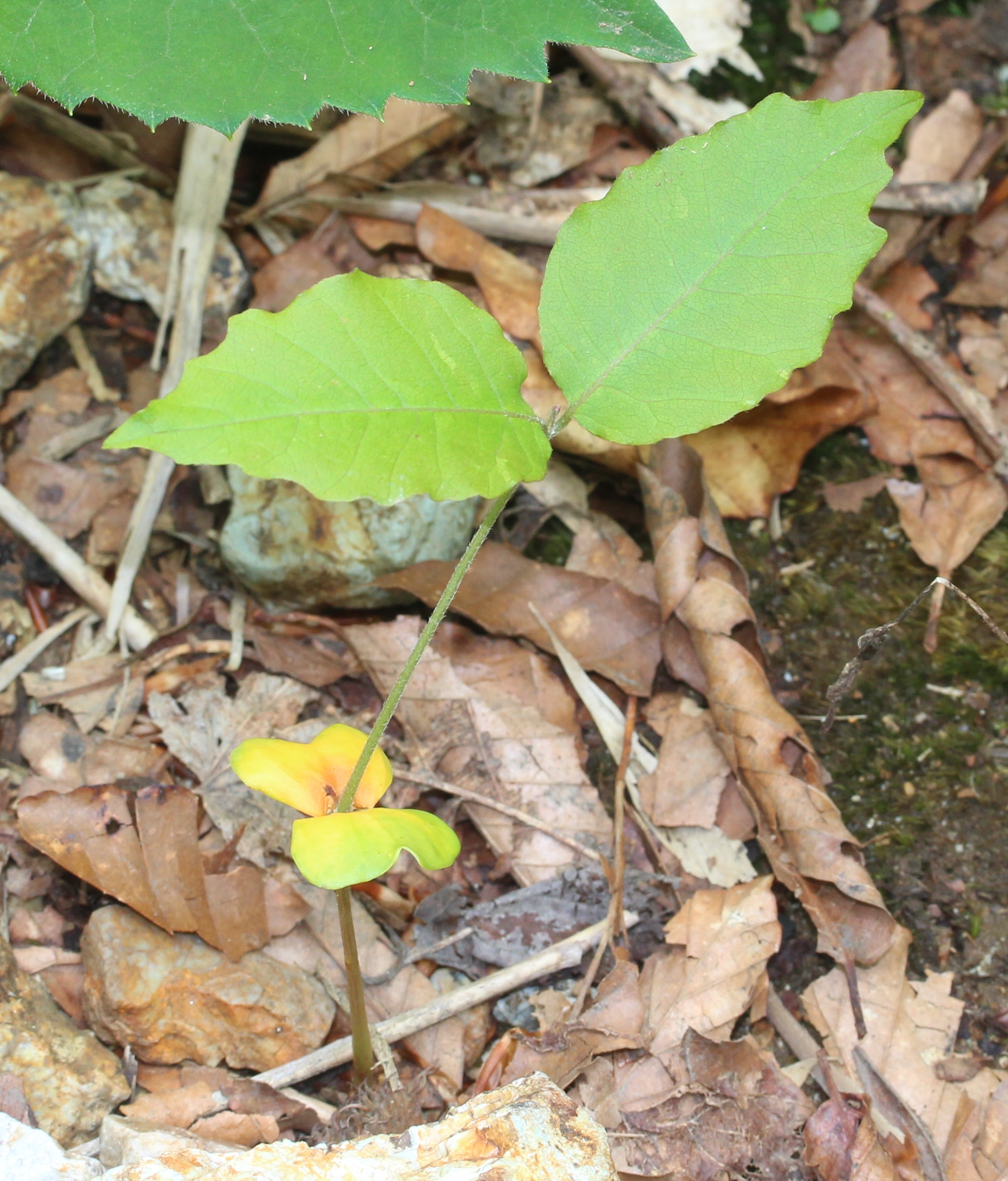
Cotyledon and leaf

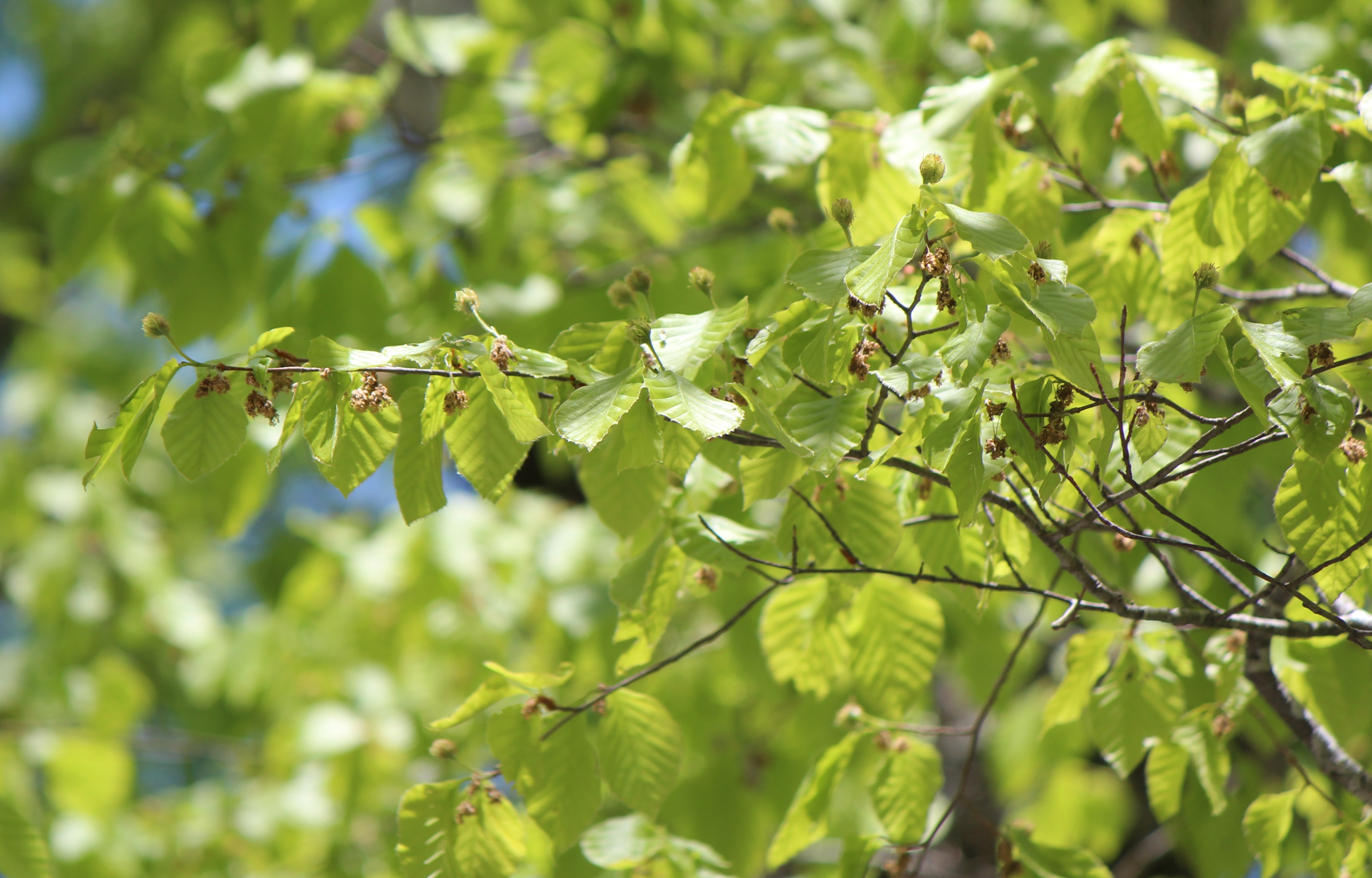
Flowers and fruits

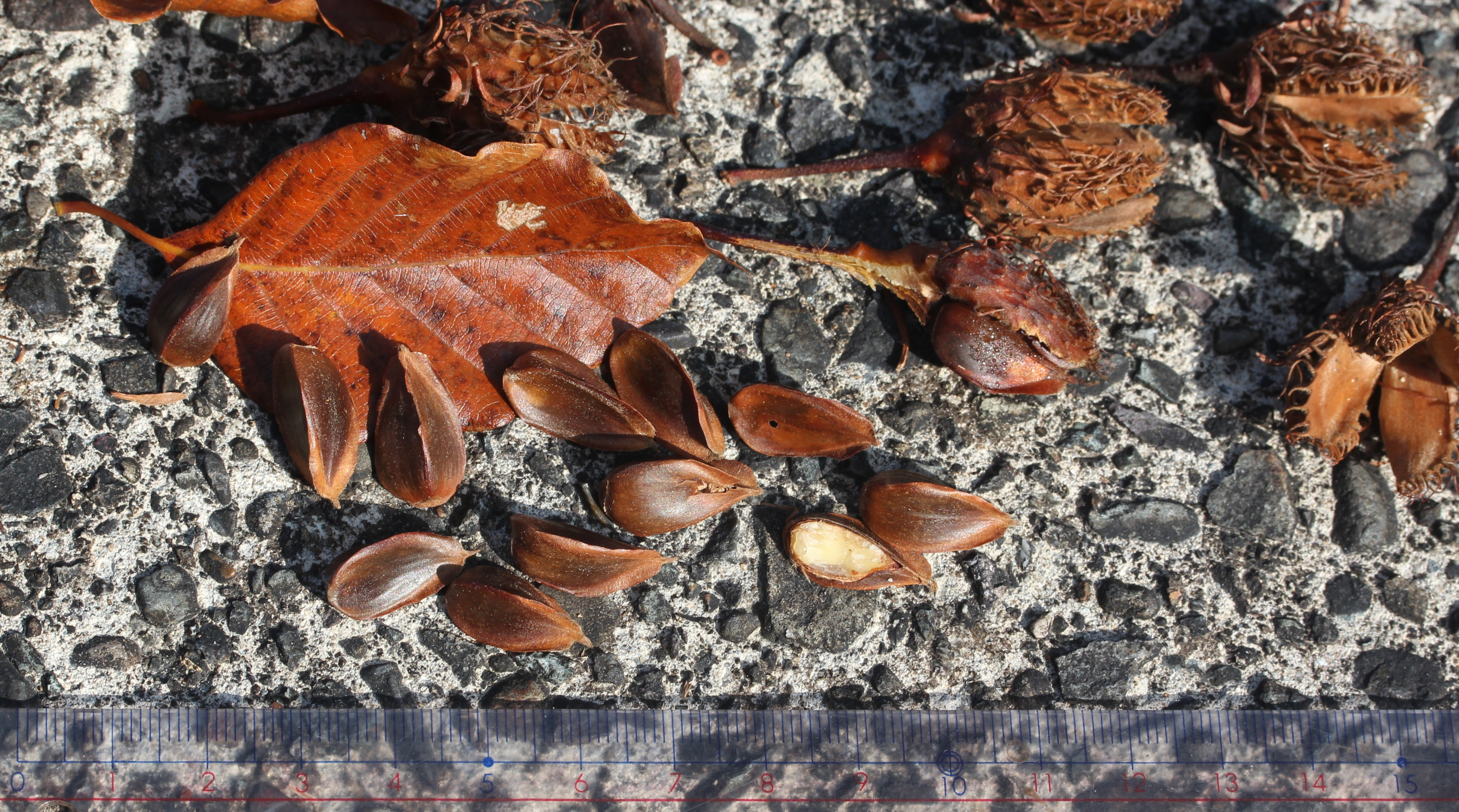
Two nuts in fruits

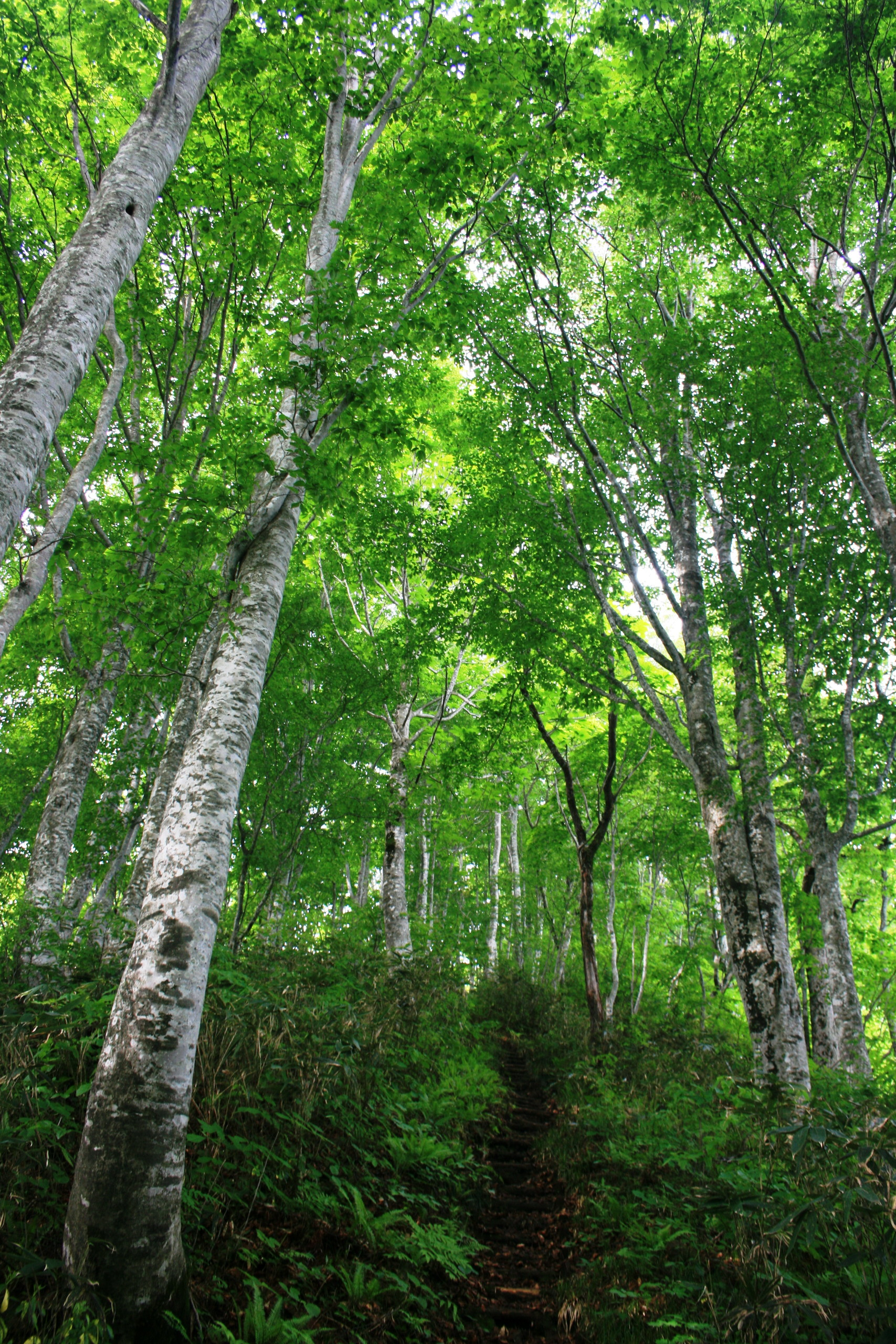
Beech forest

== Taxonomy ==
Fagus ferruginea Aiton was first mentioned by Philipp Franz von Siebold in 1830 but it was only briefly mentioned and not scientifically described. Siebold and colleagues published Flora Japonica in two volumes and thirty parts from 1835 to 1870, but did not mention F. crenata nor F. ferruginea. Previously, F. ferruginea was used to refer to both F. crenata and Fagus grandifolia. Due to the resulting confusion, F. ferruginea gradually ceased being used and the new names were formally accepted in 1997.

Fagus sieboldii is an accepted synonym of F. crenata in recognition of Siebold's extensive work on Japanese flora. This designation was first used by Stephan Endlicher in 1847. (Note: The Global Biodiversity Information Facility recognizes Endlicher's article published in 1847 as the first use of this synonym. Kew Gardens recognizes Augustin Pyramus de Candolle's 1864 publication as the first usage.) Common names for F. crenata include its Japanese name buna (Japanese: ブナ), Siebold's beech, and Japanese beech.

Fagus crenata Blume was first scientifically described by Carl Ludwig Blume in 1851. Fagus is subdivided into two subgenera: Engleriana, which are low-branching with yellowish bark, and Fagus, which is high-branching with light-grey bark. Another species of beech is found in Japan, Fagus japonica, which is in subgenus Engleriana while F. crenata is in the subgenus Fagus.

=== Etymology ===
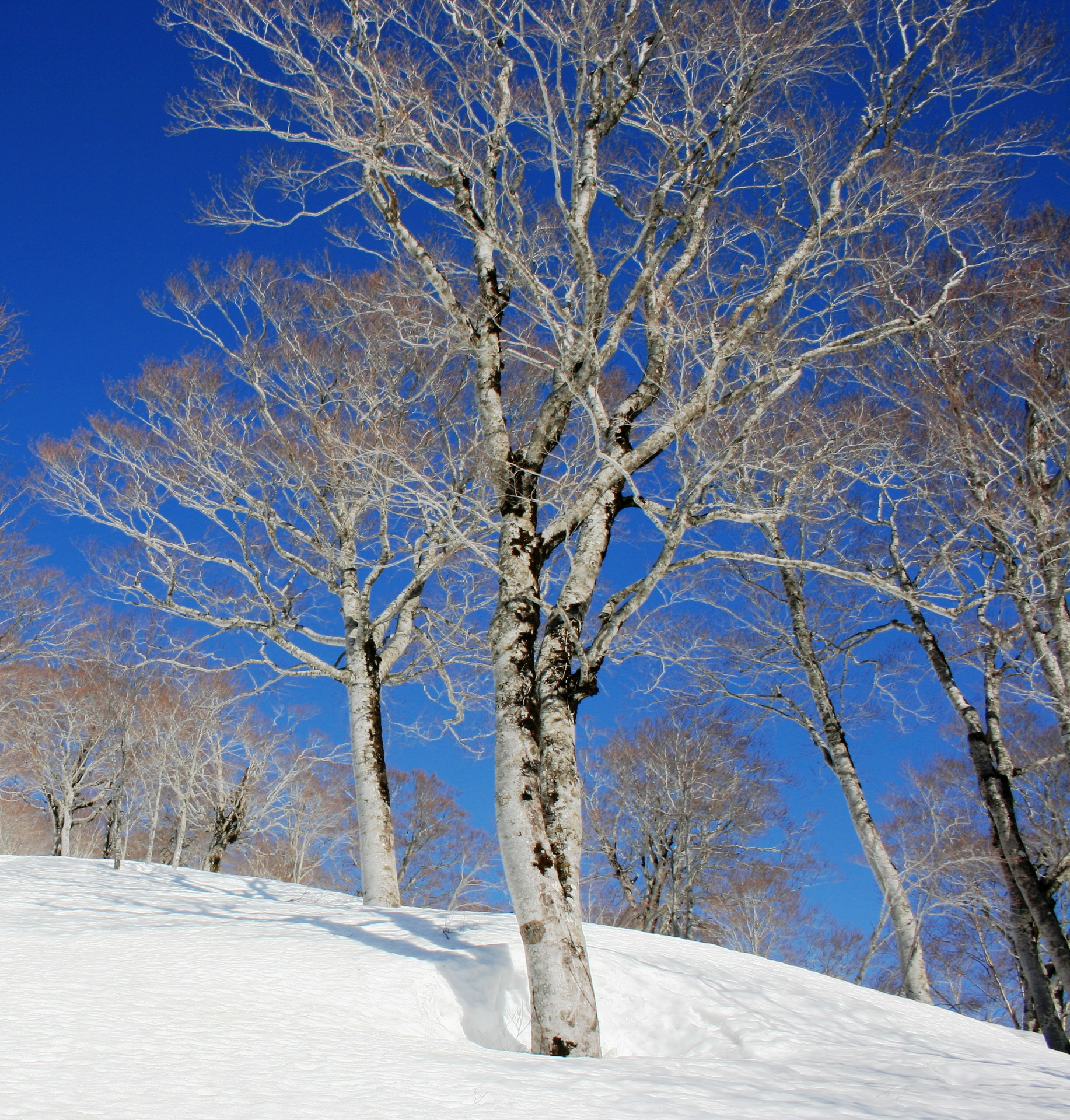
Fagus crenata in winter

The common name of "beech" is from the Anglo-Saxon boc, bece or beoce, the German buche, the Swedish box - all meaning "book" as well as beech and derived from the Sanskrit boko or letter and bokos or writings. This connection to "beech" seems to have derived from the fact that the old Runic tablets were made of beech wood.

The name of the tree genus in Latin, fagus, is cognate with English "beech" and of Indo-European origin. It played a role in early debates on the geographical origins of the Indo-European people, the beech argument. Greek φηγός (figós) is from the same root, but the word was transferred to the oak tree (e.g. Iliad 16.767) as a result of the absence of beech trees in southern Greece. Crenulata comes from the Latin crenus, meaning "notch", because the leaves have small round teeth.

== Distribution and habitat ==
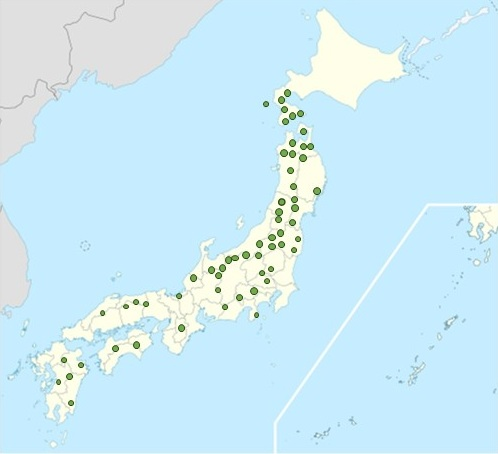
Fagus crenata native distribution map in Japan

Fagus crenata is endemic to Japan, where it is widespread and often one of the dominant trees of Japan's cool-temperate deciduous forests, where it is often colocated with Quercus crispula (Japanese oak) and Acer mono (Painted maple). All three species function as canopy trees, with F. crenata being dominant. Wind storms are the most significant cause of canopy damage to these forests. In parts of its range, other deciduous trees often found with F. crenata include: Fagus japonica, Magnolia obovata, Fraxinus lanuginosa, Acer japonicum, Quercus serrata, and Carpinus laxiflora.

Shirakami-Sanchi is a Japanese protected forest and UNESCO world heritage site in Aomori Prefecture and Akita Prefecture, Japan that features old-growth forests of F. crenata. The Shirakami-Sanchi forest is the largest remaining virgin beech forest in East Asia and the last virgin forest of F. crenata in Japan.

F. crenata is found from the Oshima Peninsula, including Okushiri Island, in Hokkaidō, and south to the Ōsumi Peninsula in Kyūshū. Divergence between Tōhoku region and Hokkaido F. crenata trees began before the Last Glacial Maximum (LGM), more than 20,000 years ago. The expansion of F. crenata from Honshu's northern Tōhoku region into Hokkaido began about 6,000 years BP. This resulted in F. crenata trees on Okushiri Island having an admixture in their genetic makeup from both the Tōhoku and Hokkaido groups of F. crenata. As temperatures warmed after the end of LGM, F. crenata's range began moving northward. The current northern limit is about 7 kilometers (4.3 mi) east of the Kuromatsunai Depression at the northern end of the Oshima Peninsula, in southwestern Hokkaido. This area is a transitional zone between the temperate forest zone and the temperate broadleaf and mixed forests zone.

In north-east Honshu, F. crenata grows in large stands from sea level up to 1,400 meters (4,600 ft) but in the south-west of its range it is restricted to mountainous areas and occurs in small, isolated populations. It grows in well-drained, loamy or sandy soils. F. japonica is mainly located on the Pacific side of Japan and is at lower elevations than F. crenata; though occasionally the two species are found together. F. crenata grows in hardiness zones 4–7.

== Ecology ==
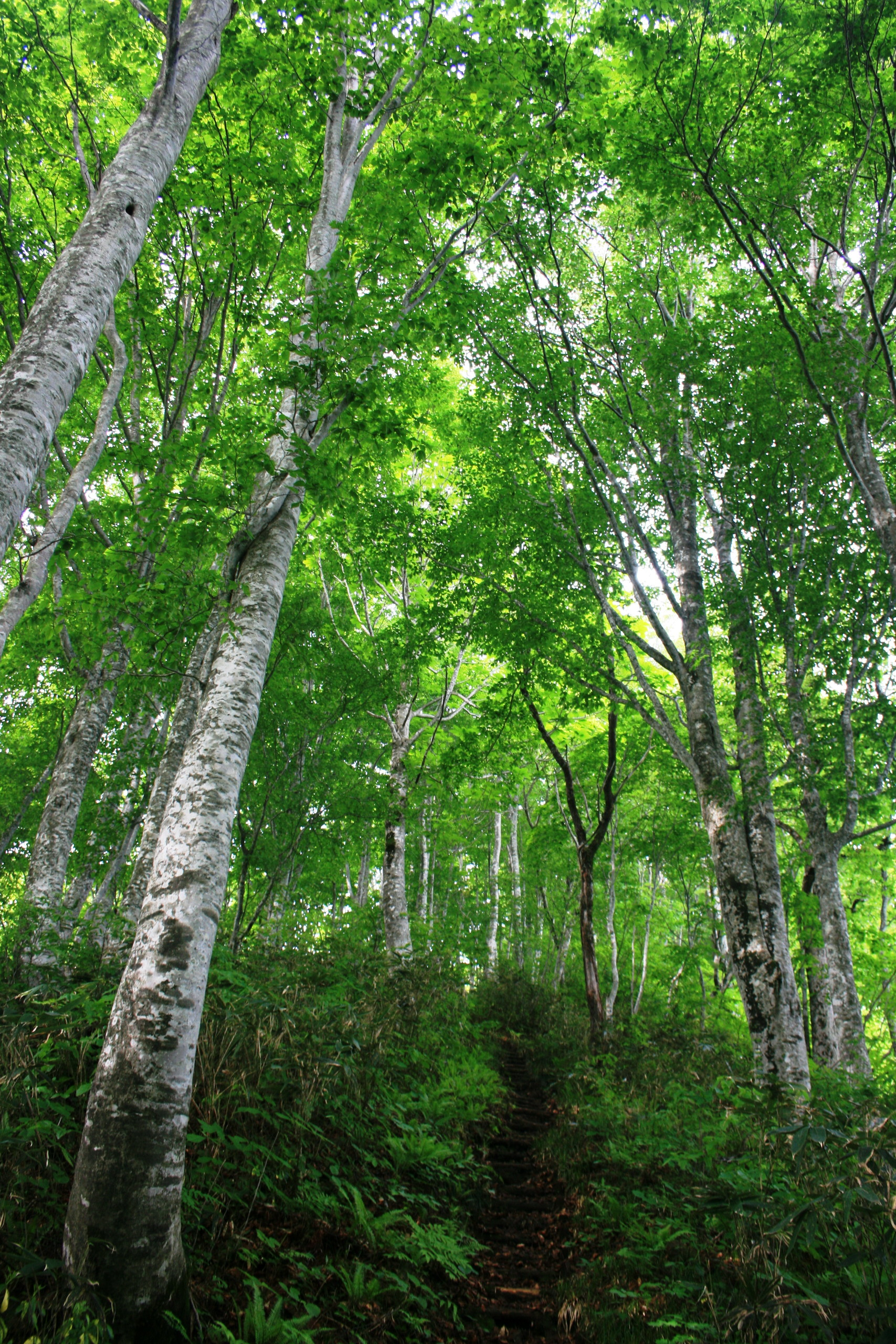
F. crenata forest

Fagus crenata is not generally subject to serious diseases but can be attacked by aphids, wooly aphids, vine weevil, caterpillars, and spider mites. The stag beetle Dorcus montivagus feeds exclusively on dead beech wood, almost always F. crenata. Human disturbance combined with F. crenata's low mortality and high growth rate is enabling the species to spread further north in Hokkaido. F. crenata has a low percentage of genetic inbreeding because of wind-pollination, self-incompatibility, and inbreeding depression. Quercus crispula refoliates at a faster rate after insect defoliation than F. crenata.

Reproduction in F. crenata significantly alters nitrogen and ammonium uptake and allocation, with large amounts of nitrogen directed towards developing nuts, which reduces the amount of nitrogen available for new shoots and leaves as well as the amount of nitrogen in the soil. During masting years, the tree increases nitrogen uptake and uses existing nitrogen from other organs like cupules and senescing leaves to support nut ripening. The variation in nut production between masting and non-masting years varies several hundred-fold.

Climate change is causing a reduction in the size of F. crenata forests. Tropospheric ozone (O_{3}) is phytotoxic to forests and has a detrimental effect on F. crenata, resulting in increased leaf senescence, sluggish stomatal response, decreased photosynthetic rate. Budburst timing is strongly linked to temperature, late spring frosts, and heat. Genetic differentiation caused by this results in different phenological responses to climate, whereby northern populations have earlier budbursts because their response to these conditions cause genetic alterations in F. crenata.

Dasyscyphella longistipitata is a fungus that is symbiotic with and grows solely on F. crenata in its cupules. Consequently, its distribution and northward expansion after the last Pleistocene era are identical. It plays a key role as a decomposer of woody debris.

== Cultivation ==
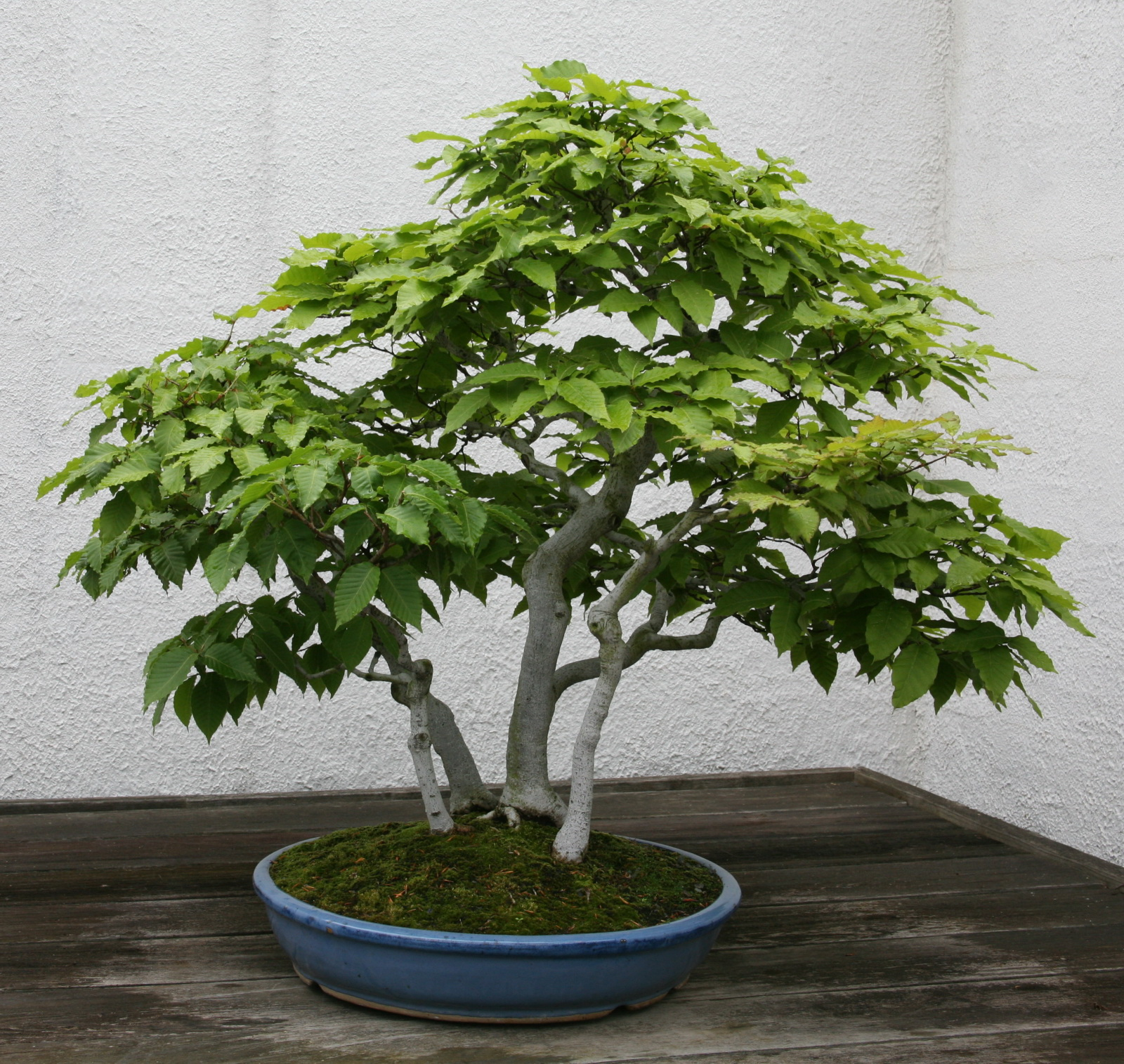
Fagus crenata bonsai

F. crenata prefers light or medium well-drained soil, including in chalky soils, clay, soil with high organic matter, and loam. Preferred soils are less than 6.0 acid and above 8.0 alkaline. It needs sun and is shade tolerant. While it does well in cold weather, it also needs hot summers. The trees grow very slowly. Because its roots can appear on the surface, there is often little or no vegetation under them. Seeds should be sown as soon as they are ripe in the autumn. Seedlings grow slowly the first few years and can be damaged by frosts.

== Uses ==
Ripe nuts, oil, and seeds can be eaten and the young, green leaves are cooked for food. Fagus crenata provides good wildlife cover, shade, and is used in bonsai. It is popular in bonsai because it looks similar to its fully grown forest specimens. Being a dense hardwood, F. crenata is useful as firewood, furniture, and in construction.
