= Caloptilia sapporella =

Scientific classification
- Kingdom: Animalia
- Phylum: Arthropoda
- Clade: Pancrustacea
- Class: Insecta
- Order: Lepidoptera
- Family: Gracillariidae
- Genus: Caloptilia
- Species: C. sapporella

Binomial name
- Caloptilia sapporella (Matsumura, 1931)

Synonyms
- Graciltaria sapporella Matsumura, 1931; Caloptilia sapporensis (Kamijo, 1965)

Species of moth

Caloptilia sapporella is a moth of the family Gracillariidae. It is known from China, Japan (Kyūshū, Shikoku, Hokkaidō, the Ryukyu Islands, Honshū), Korea and the Russian Far East.

The wingspan is 10–13.5 mm.

The larvae feed on Castanea crenata, Quercus acuminata, Quercus cerris, Quercus crispula, Quercus dentata, Quercus mongolica, Quercus serrata and Quercus variabilis. They mine the leaves of their host plant.
