= Phyllonorycter pygmaea =

Scientific classification
- Kingdom: Animalia
- Phylum: Arthropoda
- Clade: Pancrustacea
- Class: Insecta
- Order: Lepidoptera
- Family: Gracillariidae
- Genus: Phyllonorycter
- Species: P. pygmaea

Binomial name
- Phyllonorycter pygmaea (Kumata, 1963)

Synonyms
- Lithocolletis pygmaea Kumata, 1963

Species of moth

Phyllonorycter pygmaea is a moth of the family Gracillariidae. It is known from Japan (the islands of Hokkaidō, Kyūshū, Shikoku and Honshū), Korea and the Russian Far East.

The wingspan is 5-5.5 mm.

The larvae feed on Castanea crenata, Quercus acutissima, Quercus crispula, Quercus mongolica and Quercus serrata. They mine the leaves of their host plant.
