= Caloptilia mandschurica =

Scientific classification
- Domain: Eukaryota
- Kingdom: Animalia
- Phylum: Arthropoda
- Class: Insecta
- Order: Lepidoptera
- Family: Gracillariidae
- Genus: Caloptilia
- Species: C. mandschurica

Binomial name
- Caloptilia mandschurica (Christoph, 1882)

Synonyms
- Caloptilia mandshurica Ermolaev, 1977; Caloptilia mongolicae Kumata, 1982

Species of moth

Caloptilia mandschurica is a moth of the family Gracillariidae. It is known from China, Japan (Hokkaidō and Honshū), Korea and the Russian Far East.

The wingspan is 10.2–12.5 mm.

The larvae feed on Castanea crenata, Quercus acutissima, Quercus crispula, Quercus dentata, Quercus mongolica and Quercus serrata. They mine the leaves of their host plant.
