= Phyllonorycter pseudolautella =

Scientific classification
- Kingdom: Animalia
- Phylum: Arthropoda
- Class: Insecta
- Order: Lepidoptera
- Family: Gracillariidae
- Genus: Phyllonorycter
- Species: P. pseudolautella

Binomial name
- Phyllonorycter pseudolautella (Kumata, 1963)

Synonyms
- Lithocolletis pseudolautella Kumata, 1963

Species of moth

Phyllonorycter pseudolautella is a moth of the family Gracillariidae. It is known from the islands of Hokkaidō and Honshū in Japan and from the Russian Far East.

The wingspan is 6-7.5 mm.

The larvae feed on Quercus crispula, Quercus mongolica and Quercus serrata. They mine the leaves of their host plant.
