= Phyllonorycter mongolicae =

Scientific classification
- Kingdom: Animalia
- Phylum: Arthropoda
- Class: Insecta
- Order: Lepidoptera
- Family: Gracillariidae
- Genus: Phyllonorycter
- Species: P. mongolicae

Binomial name
- Phyllonorycter mongolicae (Kumata, 1963)

Synonyms
- Lithocolletis mongolicae Kumata, 1963

Species of moth

Phyllonorycter mongolicae is a moth of the family Gracillariidae. It is known from the islands of Hokkaidō, Honshū, Kyūshū and Shikoku in Japan.

The wingspan is 5.5–7 mm.

The larvae feed on Quercus crispula, Quercus mongolica and Quercus serrata. They mine the leaves of their host plant.
