= Phyllonorycter cretata =

Scientific classification
- Kingdom: Animalia
- Phylum: Arthropoda
- Class: Insecta
- Order: Lepidoptera
- Family: Gracillariidae
- Genus: Phyllonorycter
- Species: P. cretata

Binomial name
- Phyllonorycter cretata (Kumata, 1957)

Synonyms
- Lithocolletis cretata Kumata, 1957

Species of moth

Phyllonorycter cretata is a moth of the family Gracillariidae. It is known from Japan (Hokkaidō) and the Russian Far East.

The larvae feed on Quercus crispula, Quercus mongolica and Quercus serrata. They mine the leaves of their host plant.
