= Phyllonorycter matsudai =

Scientific classification
- Kingdom: Animalia
- Phylum: Arthropoda
- Class: Insecta
- Order: Lepidoptera
- Family: Gracillariidae
- Genus: Phyllonorycter
- Species: P. matsudai

Binomial name
- Phyllonorycter matsudai Kumata, 1986

Species of moth

Phyllonorycter matsudai is a moth of the family Gracillariidae. It is known from the islands of Hokkaidō and Honshū in Japan and from the Russian Far East.

The larvae feed on Quercus crispula and Quercus mongolica. They mine the leaves of their host plant.
