= F. japonica =

F. japonica may refer to:

- Fagus japonica, the Japanese blue beech, a deciduous tree species native to Japan
- Fallopia japonica, the Japanese knotweed, a large herbaceous perennial plant species native to Japan, China and Korea
- Fatsia japonica, the fatsi or Japanese aralia, a plant species native to southern Japan

== See also ==
- Japonica (disambiguation)
