= Acronicta catocaloida =

Scientific classification
- Kingdom: Animalia
- Phylum: Arthropoda
- Clade: Pancrustacea
- Class: Insecta
- Order: Lepidoptera
- Superfamily: Noctuoidea
- Family: Noctuidae
- Genus: Acronicta
- Species: A. catocaloida

Binomial name
- Acronicta catocaloida Graeser, 1889

Species of moth

Acronicta catocaloida is a moth of the family Noctuidae. It is found in China, Japan, the Korean Peninsula, and the Russian Far East (Primorye, southern Khabarovsk, the Amur region and the southern Kuriles).

The larvae feed on Quercus crispula.
