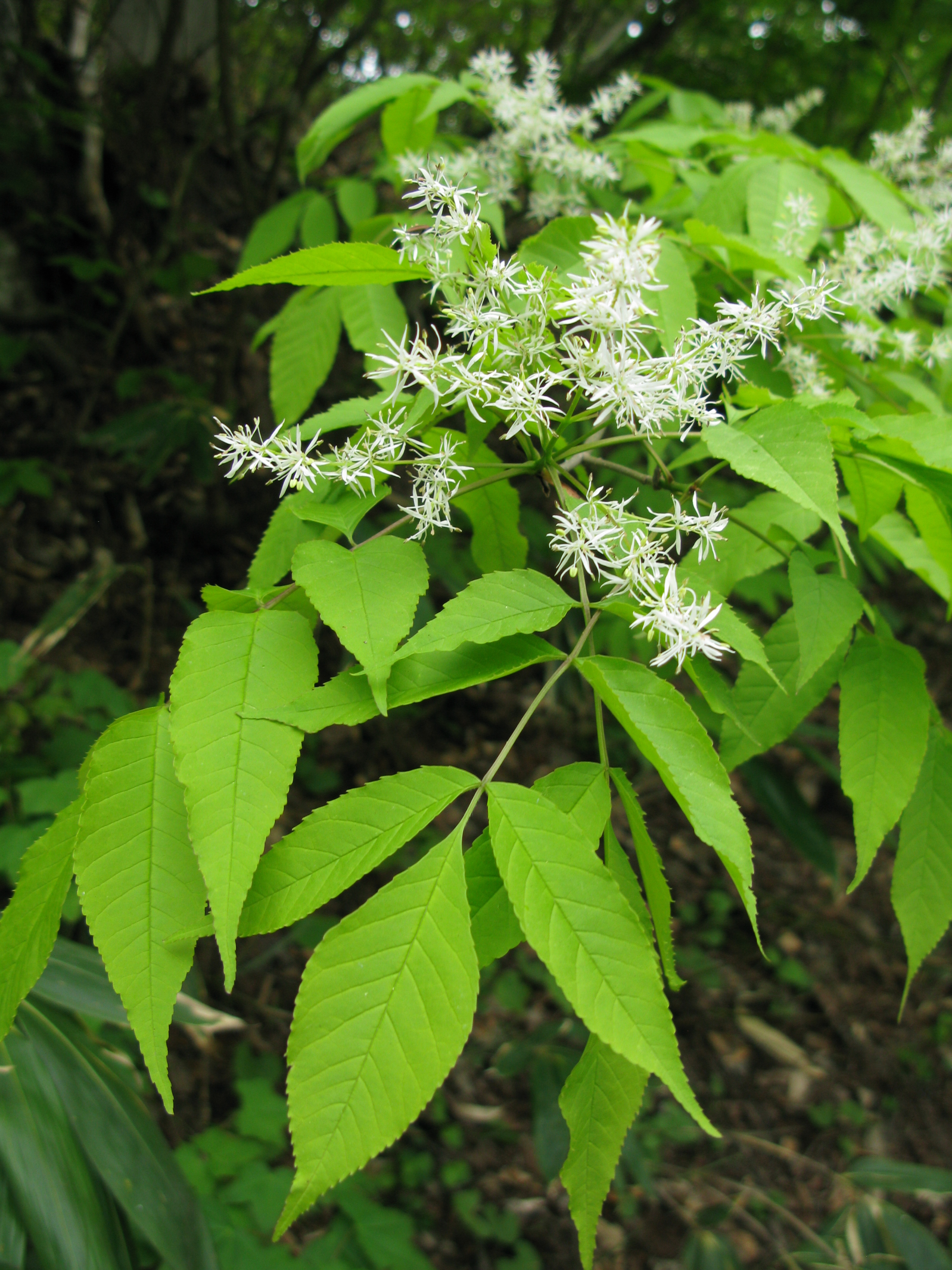

Scientific classification
- Kingdom: Plantae
- Clade: Tracheophytes
- Clade: Angiosperms
- Clade: Eudicots
- Clade: Asterids
- Order: Lamiales
- Family: Oleaceae
- Genus: Fraxinus
- Section: Fraxinus sect. Ornus
- Species: F. lanuginosa

Binomial name
- Fraxinus lanuginosa Koidz.

= Fraxinus lanuginosa =

Japanese ash アオダモ Aodamo

Species of ash

Fraxinus lanuginosa (Japanese ash; Japanese: アオダモ Aodamo) is a species of ash native to Japan and to the Primorye region of eastern Russia.

Fraxinus lanuginosa is a medium-sized deciduous tree growing to 10–15 m tall with a trunk up to 50 cm diameter. The bark is smooth, dark grey. The buds are pale pinkish-brown to grey-brown, with a dense covering of short grey hairs. The leaves are in opposite pairs, pinnate, 10–15 cm long, with 3–7 leaflets; the leaflets are broad ovoid, 4–7 cm long and 2–4 cm broad, downy at the base on the underside, with a finely serrated margin, and short indistinct petiolules. The flowers are produced in panicles after the new leaves appear in late spring, each flower with four slender creamy white petals 5–7 mm long; they are pollinated by insects. The fruit is a slender samara 2–4 cm long and 3–5 mm broad, reddish, ripening brown.

In the population of F. lanuginosa native to central Hokkaidō, northern Japan, "hermaphrodites and males commonly coexist in populations of the species. Hermaphrodites and males have identical flowering phenologies and pollen morphologies".

It is closely related to Fraxinus ornus from Europe and southwest Asia, sharing similar flower characters.

== Cultivation and uses ==
The wood is strong and hard, with a tenacity that allows it to be bent into curves, such as for making tennis rackets and skis. Its wood is also used in the making of baseball bats and electric guitars.
