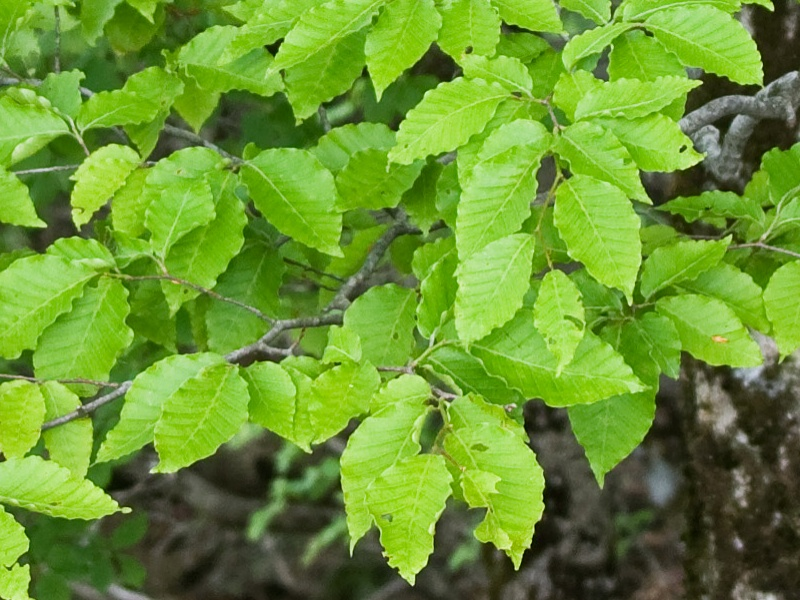

Conservation status
- Least Concern (IUCN 3.1)

Scientific classification
- Kingdom: Plantae
- Clade: Embryophytes
- Clade: Tracheophytes
- Clade: Angiosperms
- Clade: Eudicots
- Clade: Rosids
- Order: Fagales
- Family: Fagaceae
- Genus: Fagus
- Species: F. japonica

Binomial name
- Fagus japonica Maxim.

= Fagus japonica =

Japanese blue beech

Species of beech

Fagus japonica, known as the Japanese beech, Japanese blue beech or in Japanese as inubuna ("dog buna") or kurobuna ("black buna"), is a deciduous tree of the beech family Fagaceae.

== Description ==
It reaches 25 metres in height. The growth habit is often multi-trunked. Bark is smooth and grey. The simple leaves are arranged alternately along the branch. They are slightly pubescent and slightly glaucous beneath, with 10–14 pairs of lateral nerves. Fruiting peduncles are 3–4 cm long and glabrous.

== Taxonomy ==
Fagus is subdivided into two subgenera: Engleriana, which are low-branching with yellowish bark, and Fagus, which is high-branching with light-grey bark. Another species of beech is found in Japan, Fagus crenata, which is in subgenus Fagus while F. japonica is in the subgenus Engleriana.

== Distribution and habitat ==
It is endemic to Japan, where it is one of the main tree species in natural deciduous forests particularly on the Pacific side of the country.

== See also ==
- Protected Forests (Japan)

== Bibliography ==
- Sogo, Akiko; Tobe, Hiroshi (2006). "Delayed fertilization and pollen-tube growth in pistils of Fagus japonica (Fagaceae)". American Journal of Botany. 93 (12): 1748–1756. doi:10.3732/ajb.93.12.1748.
