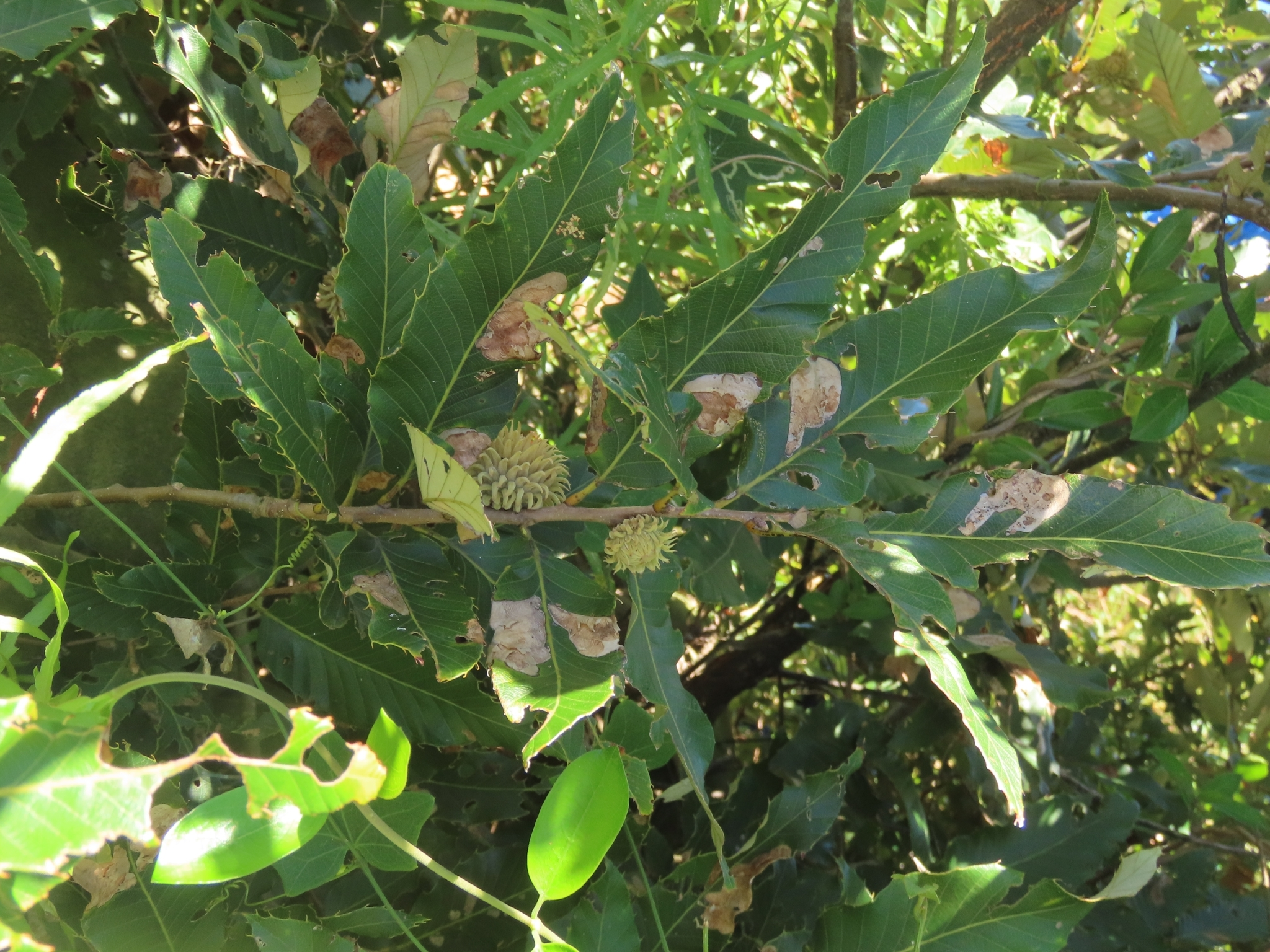

Conservation status
- Least Concern (IUCN 3.1)

Scientific classification
- Kingdom: Plantae
- Clade: Tracheophytes
- Clade: Angiosperms
- Clade: Eudicots
- Clade: Rosids
- Order: Fagales
- Family: Fagaceae
- Genus: Quercus
- Subgenus: Quercus subg. Cerris
- Section: Quercus sect. Cerris
- Species: Q. variabilis

Binomial name
- Quercus variabilis Blume

Synonyms
- Pasania variabilis (Blume) Regel; Quercus bungeana F.B.Forbes; Quercus chinensis Bunge; Quercus moulei Hance

= Quercus variabilis =

Chinese cork oak

Species of oak tree

Quercus variabilis, the Chinese cork oak, is a species of oak in the section Quercus sect. Cerris, native to a wide area of eastern Asia in southern, central, and eastern China, Taiwan, Japan, and Korea.

== Description ==
Quercus variabilis is a medium-sized to large deciduous tree growing to 25–30 metres (82–98 feet) tall with a rather open crown, and thick corky bark with deep fissures and marked by sinuous ridges. The leaves are simple, acuminate, variable in size, 8–20 centimetres (3 1/4–7 3/4 inches) long and 2–8 cm (3/4–3 1/4 in) broad, with a serrated margin with each vein ending in a distinctive fine hair-like tooth; they are green above and silvery below with dense short pubescence.

The flowers are wind-pollinated catkins produced in mid spring, maturing about 18 months after pollination; the fruit is a globose acorn, 1.5–2 cm (5/8–3/4 in) diameter, two-thirds enclosed in the acorn cup, which is densely covered in soft 4–8 millimetres (3/16–5/16 in) long 'mossy' bristles.

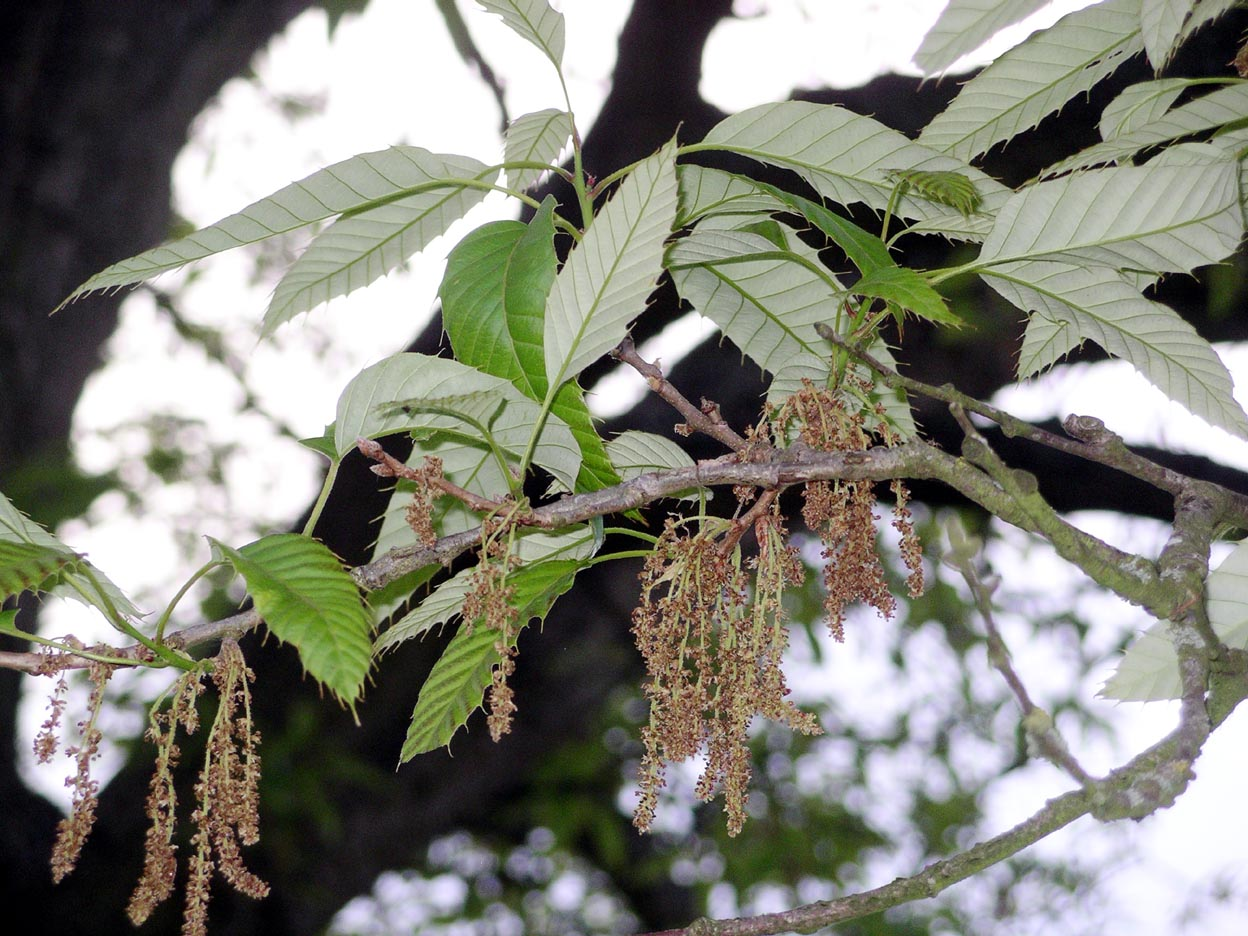
Foliage and flowers

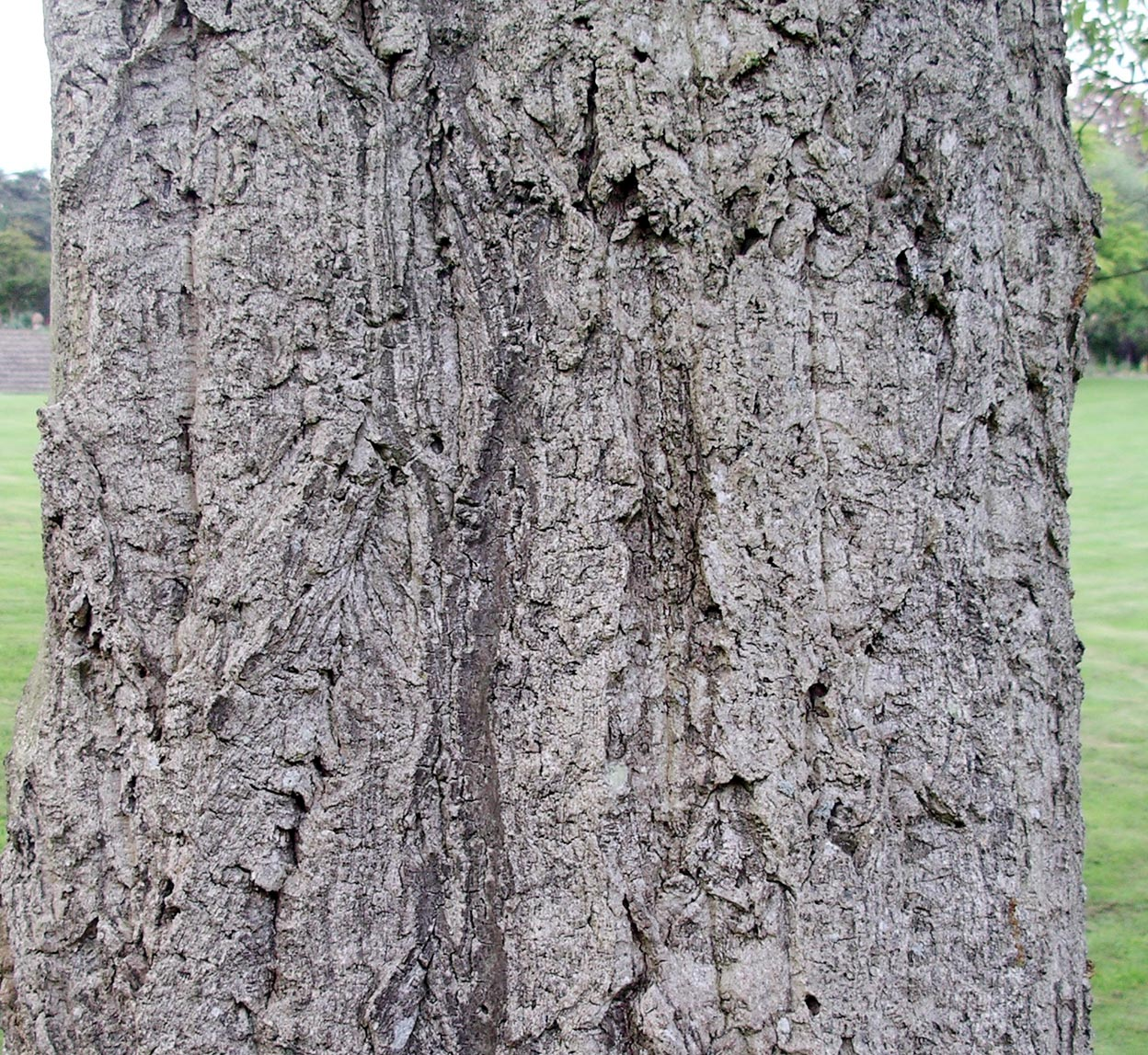
Trunk and bark of Chinese cork oak

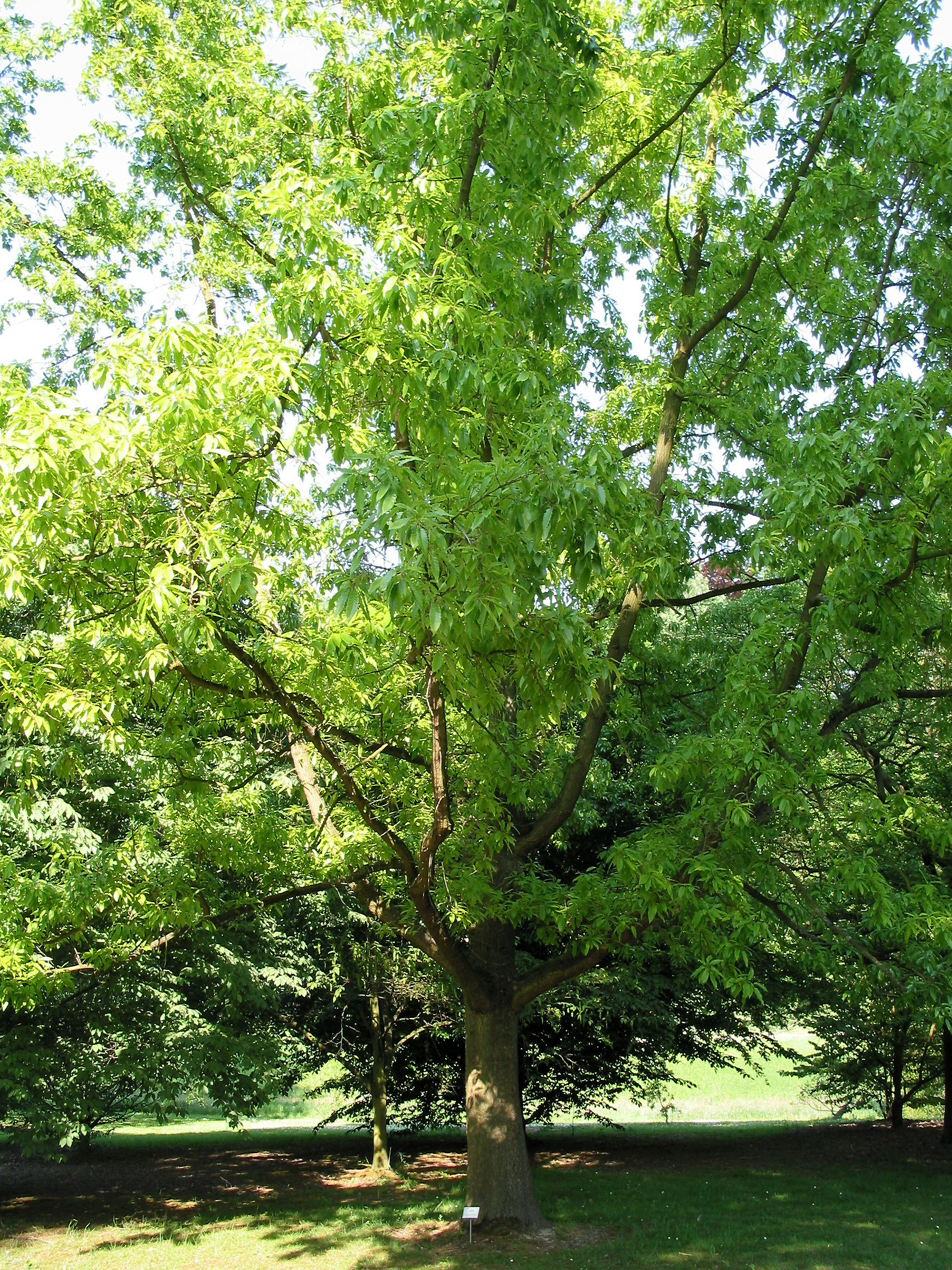
Chinese cork oak planted at Meise, Belgium

== Distribution and habitat ==
The species can be found in evergreen and deciduous forests below 3,000 m (9,800 ft), in the Chinese provinces of Anhui, Fujian, Gansu, Guangdong, Guangxi, Guizhou, Hebei, Henan, Hubei, Hunan, Jiangsu, Jiangxi, Liaoning, Shaanxi, Shandong, Shanxi, Sichuan, Taiwan, Yunnan, and Zhejiang, as well as in Japan and Korea.

== Uses ==
It is cultivated in China to a small extent for cork production, though its yield is lower than that of the related cork oak. It is also occasionally grown as an ornamental tree. For pharmaceutical grade production of Ganoderma lucidum, known in China as 'the mushroom of immortality,' the dead wood logs of Q. variabilis are used.
