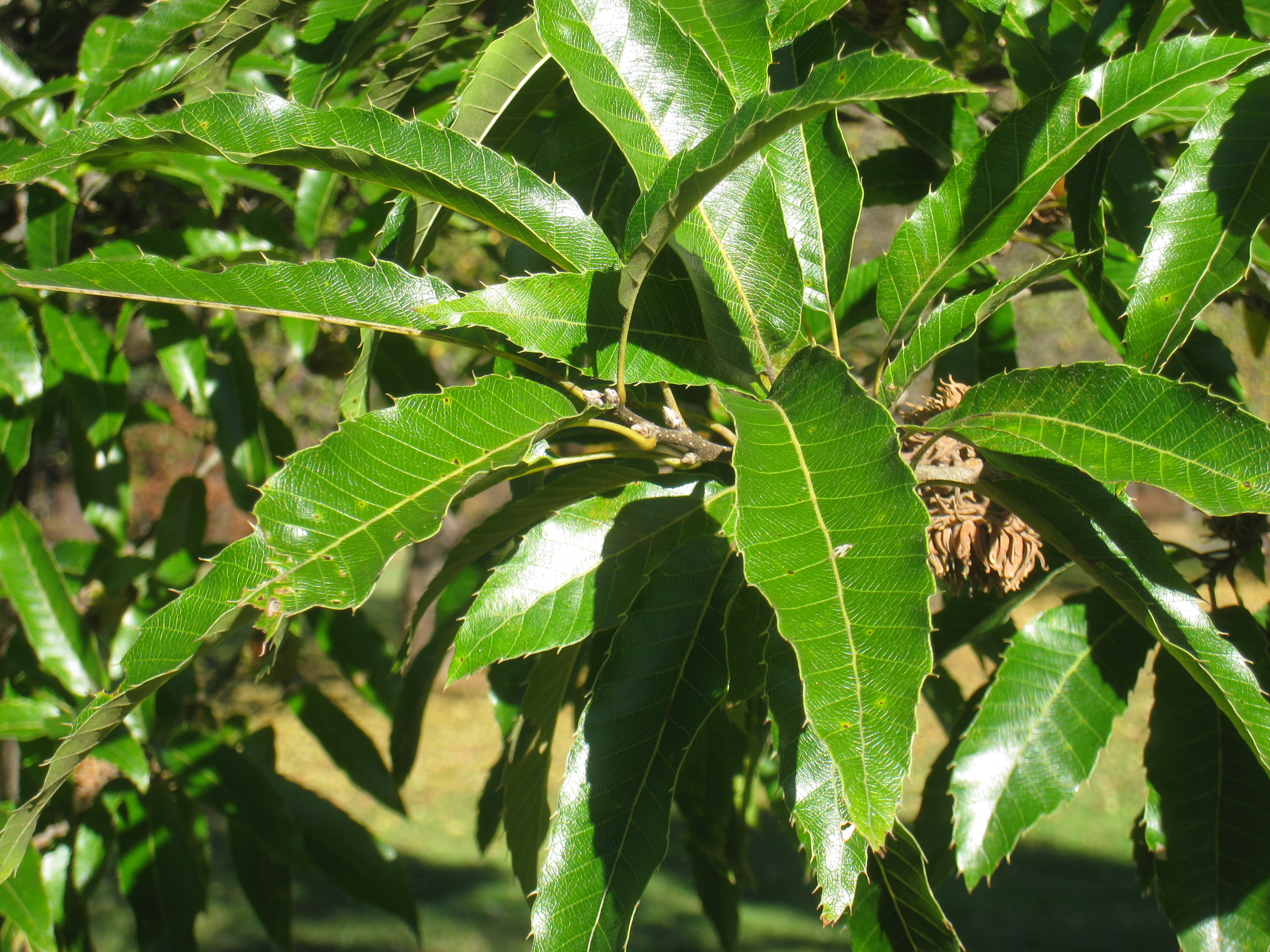

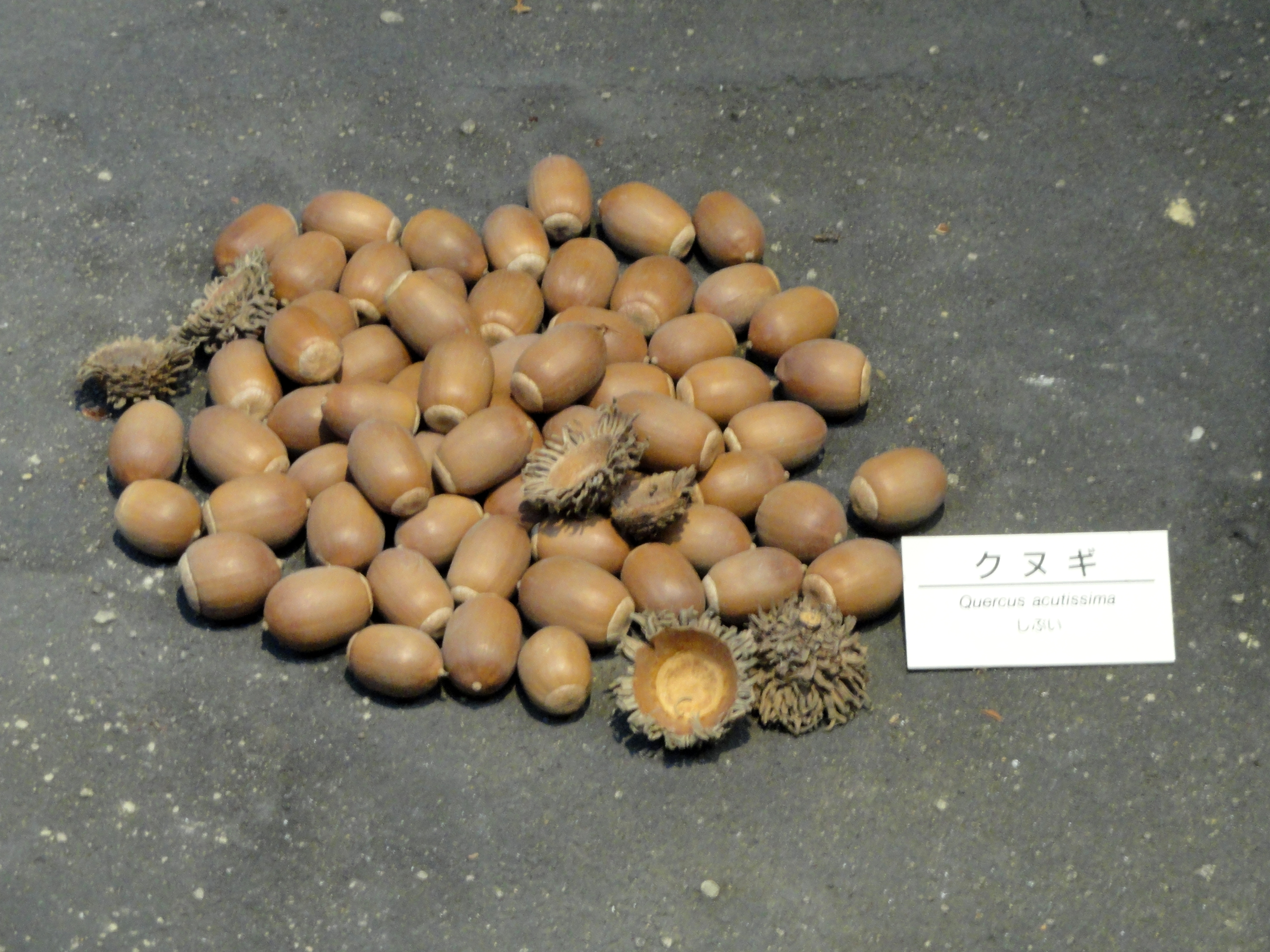

Conservation status
- Least Concern (IUCN 3.1)

Scientific classification
- Kingdom: Plantae
- Clade: Embryophytes
- Clade: Tracheophytes
- Clade: Angiosperms
- Clade: Eudicots
- Clade: Rosids
- Order: Fagales
- Family: Fagaceae
- Genus: Quercus
- Subgenus: Quercus subg. Cerris
- Section: Quercus sect. Cerris
- Species: Q. acutissima

Binomial name
- Quercus acutissima Carruth.

Subspecies
- Quercus acutissima subsp. acutissima; Quercus acutissima subsp. kingii Menitsky

Synonyms
- List: Quercus acutissima subsp. euacutissima A.Camus synonyms of subsp. acutissima: Quercus acutissima var. depressinucata H.Wei Jen & R.Q.Gao; Quercus acutissima var. lioui Kozlov; Quercus acutissima var. macrocarpa X.W.Li & Y.Q.Zhu; Quercus acutissima var. septentrionalis Liou; Quercus bombyx K.Koch; Quercus lunglingensis Hu; Quercus serrata var. attenuata Blume; Quercus serrata var. nana Blume; Quercus serrata var. obtusata Blume; Quercus serrata var. tanbakuri Blume; Quercus uchiyamana Nakai synonyms of subsp. kingii; Quercus polyantha Lindl. ex Wall.

= Quercus acutissima =

Sawtooth oak

Species of oak tree

Quercus acutissima, the sawtooth oak, is an Asian species of oak native to China (north-central, south-central, and Manchuria), Korea, Japan, Indochina (Cambodia, Laos, Myanmar, Thailand, and Vietnam), the Himalayas (Nepal, Bhutan, and Northeast India), and according to Flora of China, southeastern Tibet. It is widely planted in many lands and has become naturalized in parts of North America.

Quercus acutissima is closely related to the Turkey oak, classified with it in Quercus sect. Cerris, a section of the genus characterized by shoot buds surrounded by soft bristles, bristle-tipped leaf lobes, and acorns that mature in about 18 months.

== Description ==
Acorns from Quercus acutissima

Quercus acutissima is a medium-sized deciduous tree growing to 25–30 metres (82–98 feet) tall with a trunk up to 1.5 m (5 ft) in diameter. The bark is dark gray and deeply furrowed. The leaves are 8–20 centimetres (3 1/4–7 3/4 inches) long and 3–6 cm (1 1/4–2 1/4 in) wide, with 14–20 small saw-tooth-like triangular lobes on each side, with teeth of very regular shape.

The flowers are wind-pollinated catkins. The fruit is an acorn, maturing about 18 months after pollination, 2–3 cm (3/4–1 1/4 in) long and 2 cm broad, bi-coloured with an orange basal half grading to a green-brown tip; the acorn cap is 1.5–2 cm (5/8–3/4 in) deep, densely covered in soft 4–8 millimetres (3/16–5/16 in) long 'mossy' bristles. It is closely related to Quercus cerris, classified with it in Quercus sect. Cerris, a section of the genus characterized by shoot buds surrounded by soft bristles, bristle-tipped leaf lobes, and acorns that mature in about 18 months.

== Subspecies ==
Two subspecies are accepted.

- Quercus acutissima subsp. acutissima – Japan, Korea, Manchuria, north-central and south-central China, Vietnam, Thailand, and Cambodia
- Quercus acutissima subsp. kingii Menitsky – Nepal and eastern Himalayas to Myanmar and Laos

== Ecology ==
The acorns are very bitter, but are eaten by jays and pigeons; squirrels usually only eat them when other food sources have run out. The sap of the tree can leak out of the trunk. Beetles, stag beetles, butterflies, and Vespa mandarinia gather to reach this sap.

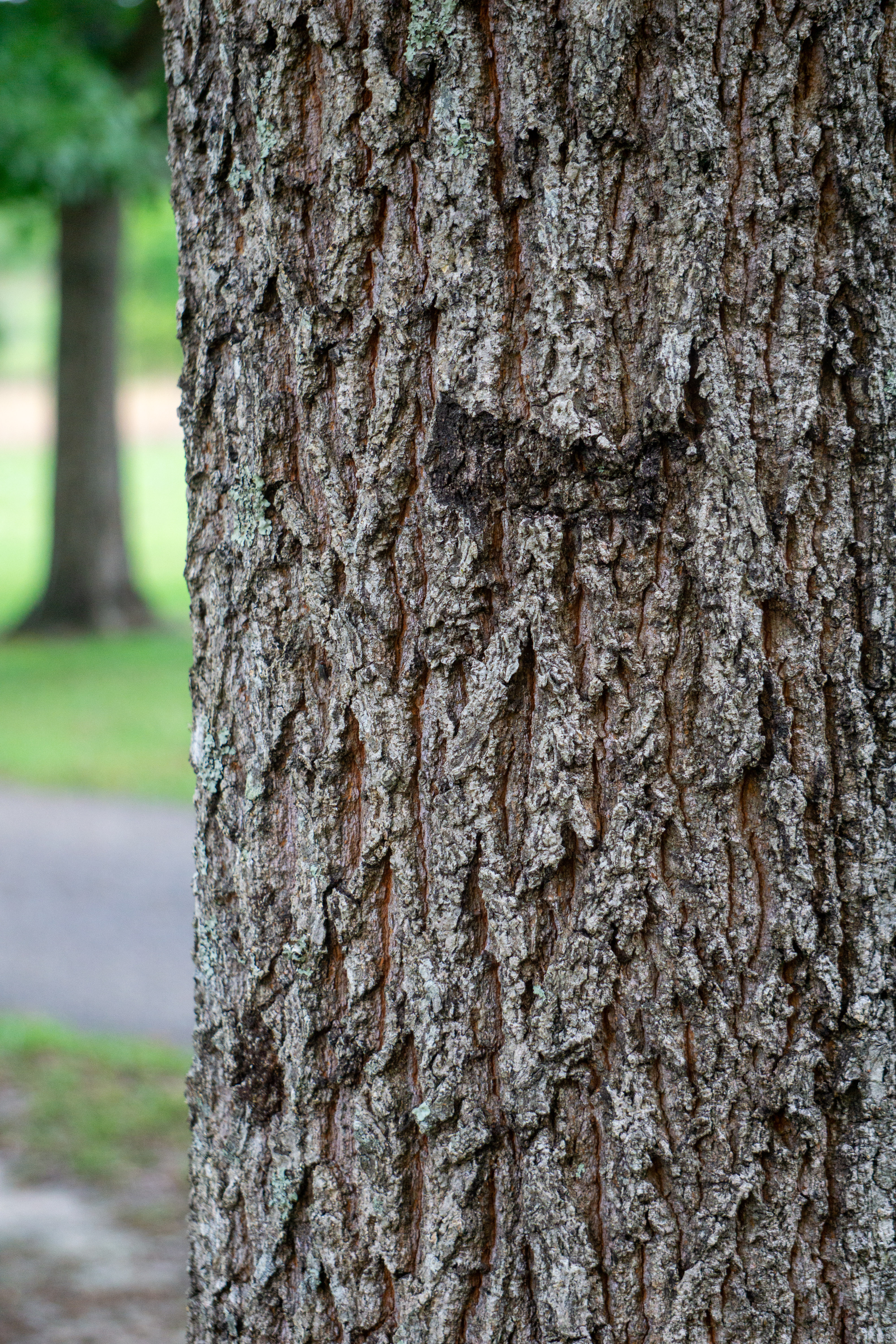
Rugged Bark of Southeast Louisiana Specimen

Native to Asia, sawtooth oak has found its way into the Eastern part of the United States in states including Florida, Missouri, New York, Alabama, Pennsylvania, and many others. Quercus acutissima was introduced into the United States around the 1920s. In order to reduce the potential harms of the sawtooth oak, researchers and scientists are advising to remove tree saplings and remove the plant species altogether from reclamation species lists. Due to their preference for well-drained acid soils, Quercus acutissima is able to thrive and survive in various harsh locations. Similarly to other species, the sawtooth oak is able to outcompete with other native species, which has the possibility to be detrimental to ecosystems. Due to its fast-growing nature, these saplings are being planted with little thought about the potential damage it may have to native species.

== Uses ==
Sawtooth oak is widely planted in eastern North America and is naturalized in scattered locations; it is also occasionally planted in Europe but has not naturalized there. Most planting in North America was carried out for wildlife food provision, as the species tends to bear heavier crops of acorns than other native American oak species; however, the bitterness of the acorns makes it less suitable for this purpose, and sawtooth oak is becoming a problematic invasive species in some areas and states, such as Louisiana. Sawtooth oak trees also grow at a faster rate which helps it compete against native trees. The wood has many of the characteristics of other oaks, but is very prone to crack and split and hence is relegated to such uses as fencing.

Charcoal made using this wood is used especially for the braziers for heating water for the Japanese tea ceremony.
