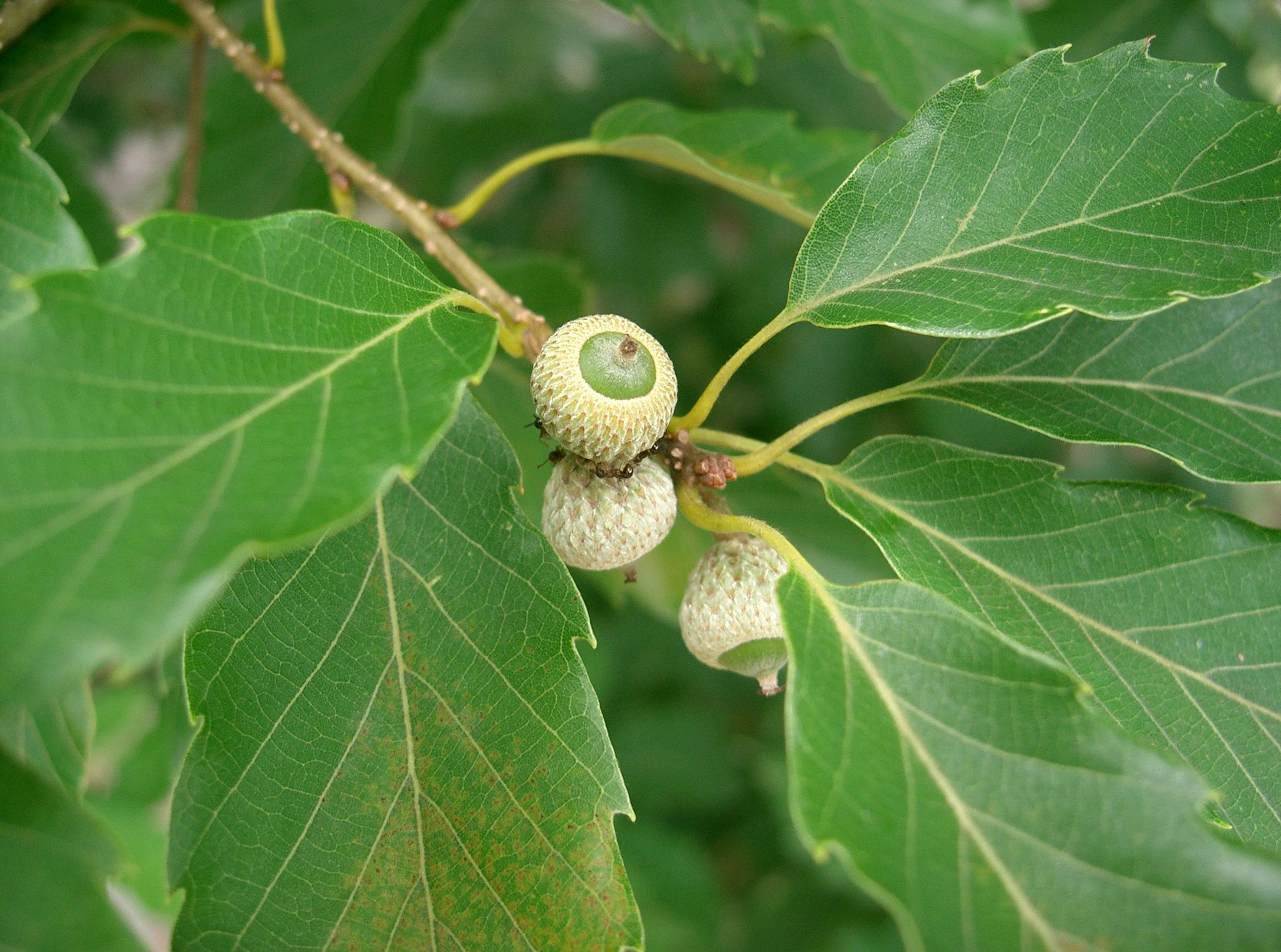

Conservation status
- Least Concern (IUCN 3.1)

Scientific classification
- Kingdom: Plantae
- Clade: Tracheophytes
- Clade: Angiosperms
- Clade: Eudicots
- Clade: Rosids
- Order: Fagales
- Family: Fagaceae
- Genus: Quercus
- Subgenus: Quercus subg. Quercus
- Section: Quercus sect. Quercus
- Species: Q. serrata

Binomial name
- Quercus serrata Murray

Synonyms
- List: Quercus canescens Blume; Quercus glandulifera Blume; Quercus glandulifera var. brevipetiolata (A.DC.) Nakai; Quercus glandulifera var. glanduligera (Franch.) Nakai; Quercus glandulifera var. inaequaliserrata Blume; Quercus glandulifera var. japonica A.Camus; Quercus glandulifera var. polymorpha Blume; Quercus glandulifera var. stellatopilosa W.H.Zhang; Quercus glandulifera var. subattenuata Blume; Quercus glandulifera var. subcrenata Blume; Quercus glandulifera var. subglabra A.Camus; Quercus glandulifera var. tomentosa B.C.Ding & T.B.Chao; Quercus griffithii var. glanduligera Franch.; Quercus neoglandulifera Nakai; Quercus neoglandulosa Nakai; Quercus neostuxbergii Koidz.; Quercus serrata var. brevipetiolata (A.DC.) Nakai; Quercus serrata f. concolor (Sugim.) H.Ohba; Quercus serrata var. concolor Sugim.; Quercus serrata var. tomentosa (B.C.Ding & T.B.Chao) Y.C.Hsu & H.Wei Jen; Quercus striata Siebold ex André; Quercus urticifolia var. brevipetiolata A.DC.

= Quercus serrata =

Species of oak tree

Quercus serrata, the jolcham oak (Chinese: 枹栎; pinyin: bāolì, Japanese: 小楢 (konara)), is an East Asian species of tree in the beech family. It is native to China, Taiwan, Japan, Korea, Myanmar, Bangladesh, and the eastern Himalayas.

== Description ==
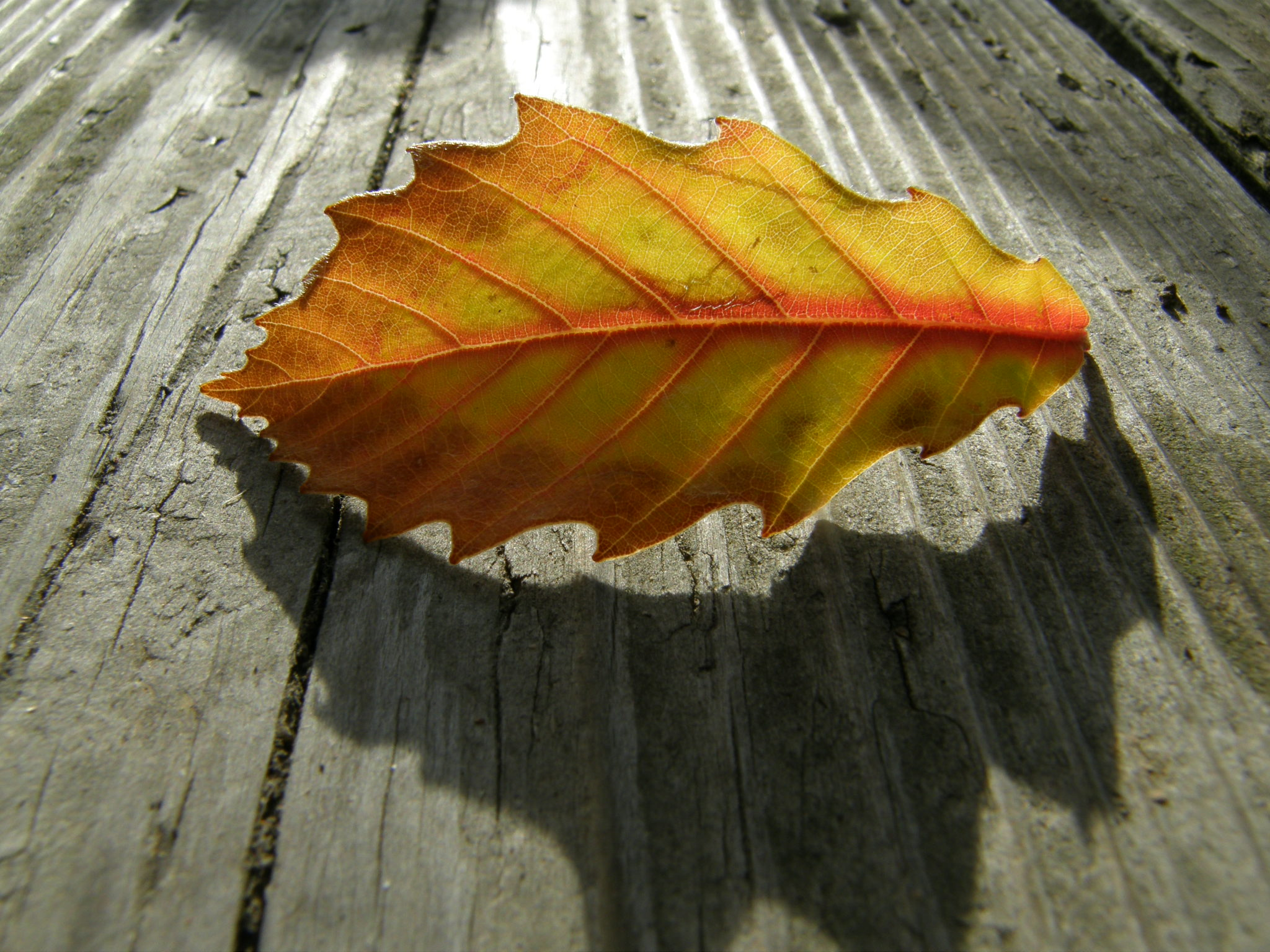
Autumnal leaves in Japan

Quercus serrata is a deciduous oak tree reaching a height of 25 metres (82 feet) occupying elevations from 100–2,000 m (330–6,560 ft). The bark is gray or reddish-brown with longitudinal furrows. The leaves are up to 17 centimetres (6 3/4 in) long by 9 cm (3 1/2 in) wide, leathery, elliptical in shape, with serrated margins; they are densely covered with trichomes when young, becoming glabrous with age. The petioles are short (3 cm). The flowers are pistillate inflorescences from 1.5–3 cm (1/2–1 1/4 in) long, occurring in March to April. The seeds are oval-shaped acorns 1.7–2 cm (5/8–3/4 in) long and take one year to mature. A cup with trichomes and triangular shaped scales covers 1/4 to 1/3 of the acorn.

The plant frequently attracts stinkbugs which lay their eggs inside them.
