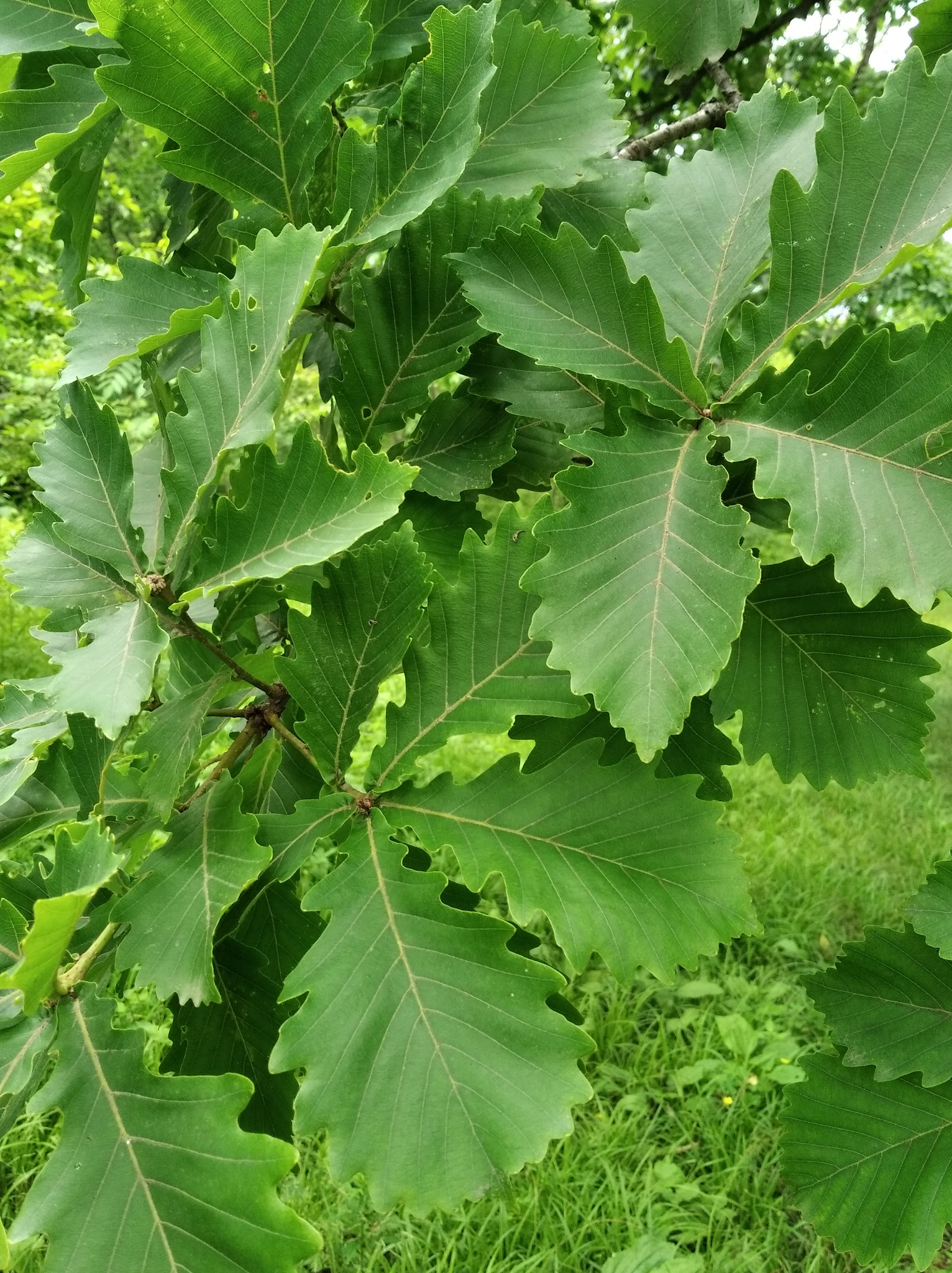
- Mongolian oak

Conservation status
- Least Concern (IUCN 3.1)
- CITES Appendix III

Scientific classification
- Kingdom: Plantae
- Clade: Embryophytes
- Clade: Tracheophytes
- Clade: Angiosperms
- Clade: Eudicots
- Clade: Rosids
- Order: Fagales
- Family: Fagaceae
- Genus: Quercus
- Subgenus: Quercus subg. Quercus
- Section: Quercus sect. Quercus
- Species: Q. mongolica

Binomial name
- Quercus mongolica Fisch. ex Ledeb.

Varieties
- Quercus mongolica var. crispula (Blume) H.Ohashi; Quercus mongolica var. mongolica; Quercus mongolica var. mongolicoides (H.Ohba) M.Aizawa

Synonyms
- Synonyms: Quercus mongolica var. typica Nakai, not validly publ.; Quercus mongolica f. typica (Nakai) Kozlov, not validly publ.; Quercus sessiliflora var. mongolica (Fisch. ex Ledeb.) Franch. synonyms of var. crispula: Quercus crispula Blume; Quercus crispula f. fastigiata V.V.Byalt & Firsov; Quercus crispula var. grosseserrata (Blume) Miq.; Quercus crispula var. horikawae H.Ohba; Quercus crispula var. sachalinensis Koidz.; Quercus crispulimongolica Nakai, nom. nud.; Quercus crispuloides Uyeki; Quercus grosseserrata Blume; Quercus grosseserrata f. longifolia Nakai; Quercus grosseserrata f. macrocarpa Nakai; Quercus humosa Blume; Quercus keizo-kishimae Yanagita; Quercus liaotungensis Koidz.; Quercus mongolica subsp. crispula (Blume) Menitsky; Quercus mongolica f. glabra Nakai; Quercus mongolica var. grosseserrata (Blume) Rehder & E.H.Wilson; Quercus mongolica var. liaotungensis (Koidz.) Nakai; Quercus mongolica f. longifolia (Nakai) Kitam. & T.Horik.; Quercus mongolica f. macrocarpa (Nakai) Kitam. & T.Horik.; Quercus serratoides Uyeki; Quercus serratoides var. ovata Uyeki synonyms of var. mongolica: Quercus crispula var. manshurica Koidz.; Quercus kirinensis Nakai; Quercus mongolica f. funebris Nakai; Quercus mongolica var. kirinensis (Nakai) Kitag.; Quercus mongolica f. laciniata Hayashi, nom. illeg. homonym. post.; Quercus mongolica var. macrocarpa H.W.Jen & L.M.Wang; Quercus mongolica var. manshurica (Koidz.) Nakai; Quercus mongolica f. tomentosa Nakai; Quercus mongolica var. tomentosa (Nakai) A.Camus synonyms of var. mongolicioides: Quercus crispula var. mongolicoides (H.Ohba) Seriz.; Quercus mongolicoides (H.Ohba) Hiroki; Quercus serrata subsp. mongolicoides H.Ohba

= Quercus mongolica =

Mongolian oak

Species of oak tree

Quercus mongolica, commonly known as Mongolian oak, is a species of oak native to Japan, northern China, Korea, Mongolia, and southeastern Siberia. The species can grow to be 30 metres (98 feet) tall.

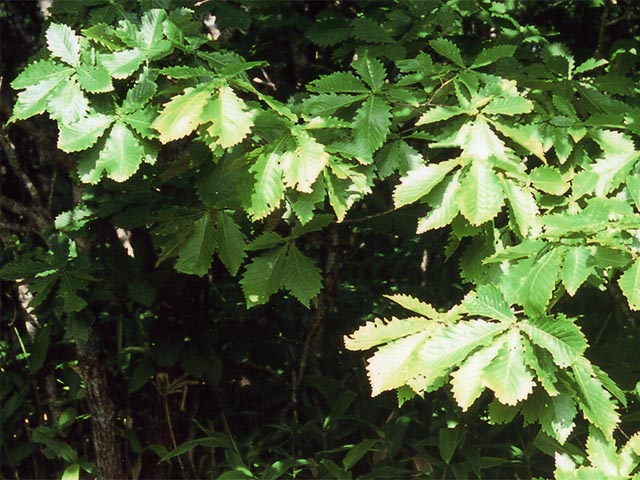
Foliage

The flavono-ellagitannins mongolicin A and B can be found in Quercus mongolica var. grosseserrata.

Extrafloral nectaries have been reported on the leaf buds of this species.

Three varieties are accepted:

- Quercus mongolica var. crispula (Blume) H.Ohashi – Japan, Korea, Manchuria, southern Russian Far East, and Sakhalin
- Quercus mongolica var. mongolica – Mongolia, northern China, Korea, and southern Russian Far East
- Quercus mongolica var. mongolicoides (H.Ohba) M.Aizawa – Kantō region of Honshu, Japan
