= Shibetsu River =

River in Hokkaidō, Japan

Shibetsu River 標津川
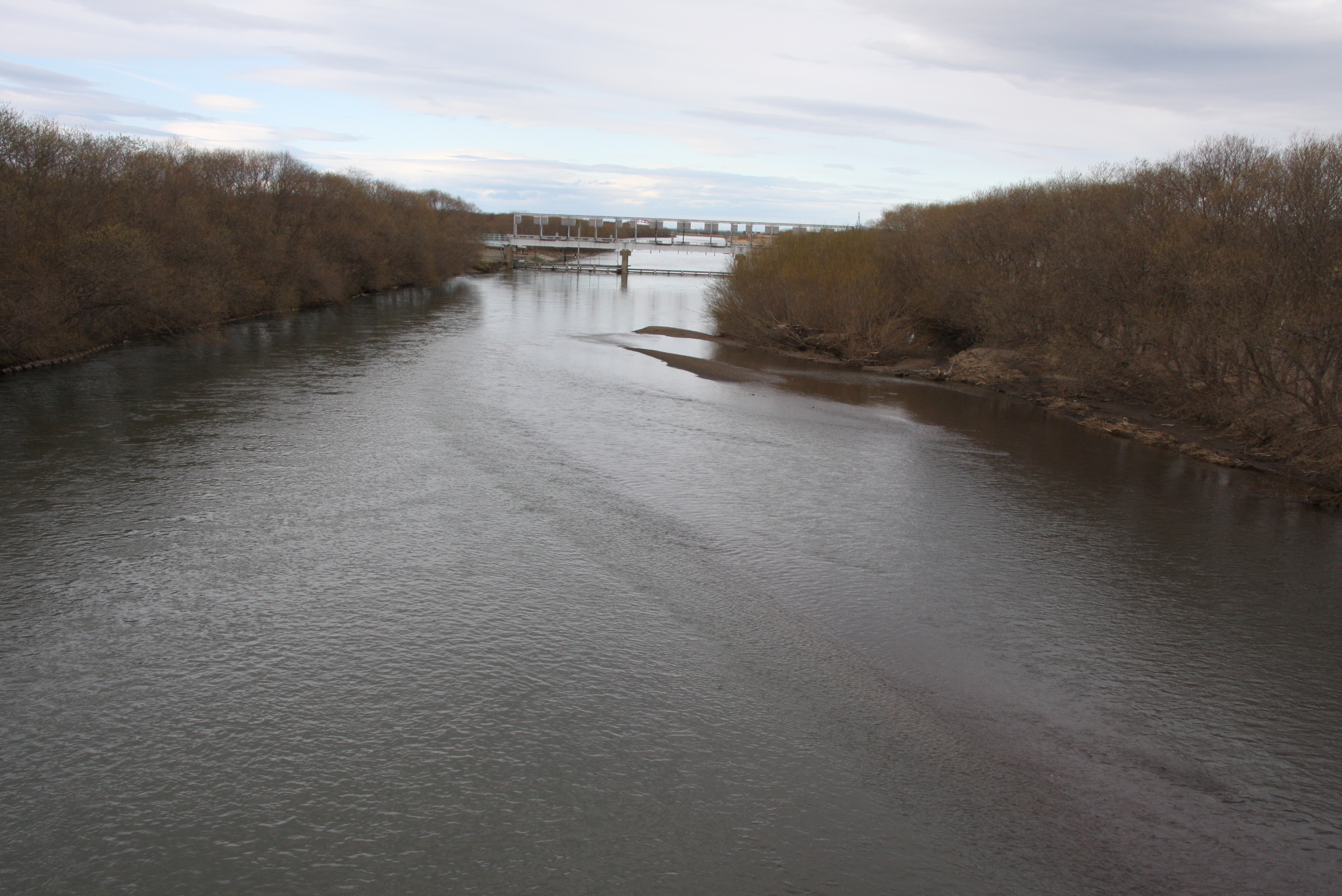

- Location within Japan
- Native name: Shibetsu Gawa (Japanese)

Location
- Country: Japan
- State: Hokkaidō
- Region: Nemuro
- District: Shibetsu
- Municipalities: Nakashibetsu, Shibetsu

Physical characteristics
- Source: Mount Shibetsu
  - location: Nakashibetsu, Hokkaidō, Japan
  - coordinates: 43°40′5″N 144°42′17″E
  - elevation: 1,061 m (3,481 ft)
- Mouth: Sea of Okhotsk
  - location: Shibetsu, Hokkaidō, Japan
  - coordinates: 43°40′19″N 145°7′47″E
  - elevation: 0 m (0 ft)
- Length: 77.9 km (48.4 mi)
- Basin size: 294.8 km^{2} (113.8 sq mi)

Shibetsu River (標津川, Shibetsu Gawa) is a river in Hokkaidō, Japan. It originates from Mount Shibetsu and flows through Nakashibetsu and Shibetsu into the Sea of Okhotsk.
