= Nemuro Province =

Former province of Japan

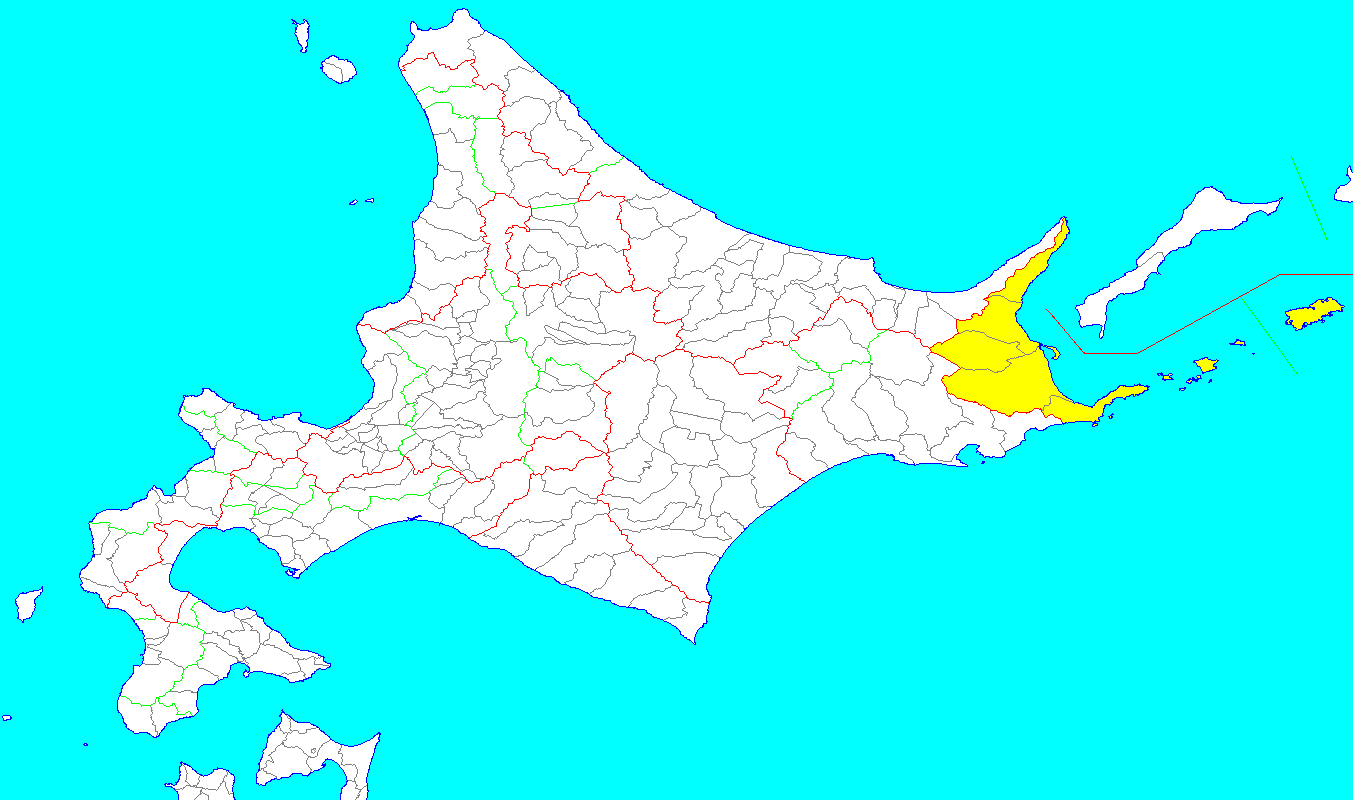
Location of Nemuro Province c. 1869.

Nemuro Province (根室国, Nemuro no Kuni; Japanese pronunciation: [né̞.mɯ̈̀.ɾò̞ (nò̞ kɯ̈̀.ɲ̟ì)]) was an old province in Japan in what is today Nemuro Subprefecture, Hokkaido. It was created during the Meiji Era.

== History ==
After 1869, the northern Japanese island was known as Hokkaido; and regional administrative subdivisions were identified, including Nemuro Province.

- August 15, 1869 Nemuro Province created with five districts
- 1872 Population is 832.
- January 1885 Shikotan transferred to Chishima Province

== Districts ==
- Hanasaki (花咲郡) (dissolved April 1, 1959 when Habomai Village was merged into Nemuro City; originally included Shikotan District)
- Nemuro (根室郡) (dissolved August 1, 1957 when Nemuro Town and Wada Village merged to form Nemuro City)
- Notsuke (野付郡)
- Shibetsu (標津郡)
- Menashi (目梨郡)
