= List of villages in Japan =

A village (村, mura, son) (Note: As a standalone word, 村 is pronounced with the kun'yomi mura. As a bound morpheme, it also has the on'yomi son, for example in the compounds shichōson (市町村; "cities, towns and villages") and sonchō (村長; "village mayor"). As a suffix in village names, it can be either -mura or -son; -son is rather common for villages in Okinawa (check the list below).) is a local administrative unit in Japan.

It is a local public body along with prefecture (県, ken; or other equivalents), city (市, shi), and town (町, chō, machi). Geographically, a village's extent is contained within a prefecture. Villages are larger than a local settlement; each is a subdivision of rural district (郡, gun), which are subdivided into towns and villages with no overlap and no uncovered area. As a result of mergers and elevation to higher statuses, the number of villages in Japan is decreasing.

As of 2006, 13 prefectures no longer have any villages: Tochigi (since March 20, 2006), Fukui (since March 3, 2006), Ishikawa (since March 1, 2005), Shizuoka (since July 1, 2005), Hyōgo (since April 1, 1999), Mie (since November 1, 2005), Shiga (since January 1, 2005), Hiroshima (since November 5, 2004), Yamaguchi (since March 20, 2006), Ehime (since January 16, 2005), Kagawa (since April 1, 1999), Nagasaki (since October 1, 2005), and Saga (since March 20, 2006).

村 can have the reading of mura or son, but with the exception of Tottori, Okayama, Hiroshima, Yamaguchi, Tokushima, Miyazaki and Okinawa, most prefectures use the mura reading.

Atarashiki-mura (which is an autonomous village community) is not included in the list below because it is not a separate municipality.

== Villages ==
| Village | Japanese | Prefecture | District | Area (in km^{2}) |
|---|---|---|---|---|
| Shinshinotsu | 新篠津村 | Hokkaido | Ishikari | 78.04 |
| Shimamaki | 島牧村 | Hokkaido | Shimamaki | 437.18 |
| Makkari | 真狩村 | Hokkaido | Abuta | 114.25 |
| Rusutsu | 留寿都村 | Hokkaido | Abuta | 119.84 |
| Tomari | 泊村 | Hokkaido | Furuu | 82.28 |
| Kamoenai | 神恵内村 | Hokkaido | Furuu | 147.80 |
| Akaigawa | 赤井川村 | Hokkaido | Yoichi | 280.09 |
| Shimukappu | 占冠村 | Hokkaido | Yūfutsu | 571.41 |
| Otoineppu | 音威子府村 | Hokkaido | Nakagawa (Teshio) | 275.63 |
| Shosanbetsu | 初山別村 | Hokkaido | Tomamae | 279.51 |
| Sarufutsu | 猿払村 | Hokkaido | Sōya | 589.97 |
| Nishiokoppe | 西興部村 | Hokkaido | Monbetsu | 308.08 |
| Nakasatsunai | 中札内村 | Hokkaido | Kasai | 292.58 |
| Sarabetsu | 更別村 | Hokkaido | Kasai | 176.90 |
| Tsurui | 鶴居村 | Hokkaido | Akan | 571.80 |
| Yomogita | 蓬田村 | Aomori | Higashitsugaru | 80.65 |
| Nishimeya | 西目屋村 | Aomori | Nakatsugaru | 246.02 |
| Inakadate | 田舎館村 | Aomori | Minamitsugaru | 22.35 |
| Rokkasho | 六ヶ所村 | Aomori | Kamikita | 252.68 |
| Higashidōri | 東通村 | Aomori | Shimokita | 295.27 |
| Kazamaura | 風間浦村 | Aomori | Shimokita | 69.55 |
| Sai | 佐井村 | Aomori | Shimokita | 135.04 |
| Shingō | 新郷村 | Aomori | Sannohe | 150.77 |
| Tanohata | 田野畑村 | Iwate | Shimohei | 156.19 |
| Fudai | 普代村 | Iwate | Shimohei | 69.66 |
| Noda | 野田村 | Iwate | Kunohe | 80.80 |
| Kunohe | 九戸村 | Iwate | Kunohe | 134.02 |
| Ōhira | 大衡村 | Miyagi | Kurokawa | 60.32 |
| Kamikoani | 上小阿仁村 | Akita | Kitaakita | 256.72 |
| Ōgata | 大潟村 | Akita | Minamiakita | 170.11 |
| Higashinaruse | 東成瀬村 | Akita | Ogachi | 203.69 |
| Ōkura | 大蔵村 | Yamagata | Mogami | 211.63 |
| Sakegawa | 鮭川村 | Yamagata | Mogami | 122.14 |
| Tozawa | 戸沢村 | Yamagata | Mogami | 261.31 |
| Ōtama | 大玉村 | Fukushima | Adachi | 79.44 |
| Ten'ei | 天栄村 | Fukushima | Iwase | 225.52 |
| Hinoemata | 檜枝岐村 | Fukushima | Minamiaizu | 390.46 |
| Kitashiobara | 北塩原村 | Fukushima | Yama | 234.08 |
| Yugawa | 湯川村 | Fukushima | Kawanuma | 16.37 |
| Shōwa | 昭和村 | Fukushima | Ōnuma | 209.46 |
| Nishigō | 西郷村 | Fukushima | Nishishirakawa | 192.06 |
| Izumizaki | 泉崎村 | Fukushima | Nishishirakawa | 35.43 |
| Nakajima | 中島村 | Fukushima | Nishishirakawa | 18.92 |
| Samegawa | 鮫川村 | Fukushima | Higashishirakawa | 131.34 |
| Tamakawa | 玉川村 | Fukushima | Ishikawa | 46.67 |
| Hirata | 平田村 | Fukushima | Ishikawa | 93.42 |
| Kawauchi | 川内村 | Fukushima | Futaba | 197.35 |
| Katsurao | 葛尾村 | Fukushima | Futaba | 84.37 |
| Iitate | 飯舘村 | Fukushima | Sōma | 230.13 |
| Tōkai | 東海村 | Ibaraki | Naka | 37.98 |
| Miho | 美浦村 | Ibaraki | Inashiki | 66.61 |
| Shintō | 榛東村 | Gunma | Kitagunma | 27.92 |
| Ueno | 上野村 | Gunma | Tano | 181.85 |
| Nanmoku | 南牧村 | Gunma | Kanra | 118.83 |
| Tsumagoi | 嬬恋村 | Gunma | Agatsuma | 337.58 |
| Takayama | 高山村 | Gunma | Agatsuma | 64.18 |
| Katashina | 片品村 | Gunma | Tone | 391.76 |
| Kawaba | 川場村 | Gunma | Tone | 85.25 |
| Shōwa | 昭和村 | Gunma | Tone | 64.14 |
| Higashichichibu | 東秩父村 | Saitama | Chichibu | 37.06 |
| Chōsei | 長生村 | Chiba | Chōsei | 28.29 |
| Hinohara | 檜原村 | Tokyo | Nishitama | 105.41 |
| Toshima | 利島村 | Tokyo | (Ōshima) | 4.12 |
| Niijima | 新島村 | Tokyo | (Ōshima) | 27.52 |
| Kōzushima | 神津島村 | Tokyo | (Ōshima) | 18.58 |
| Miyake | 三宅村 | Tokyo | (Miyake) | 55.27 |
| Mikurajima | 御蔵島村 | Tokyo | (Miyake) | 20.54 |
| Aogashima | 青ヶ島村 | Tokyo | (Hachijō) | 5.96 |
| Ogasawara | 小笠原村 | Tokyo | (Ogasawara) | 106.88 |
| Kiyokawa | 清川村 | Kanagawa | Aikō | 71.24 |
| Yahiko | 弥彦村 | Niigata | Nishikanbara | 25.17 |
| Kariwa | 刈羽村 | Niigata | Kariwa | 26.27 |
| Sekikawa | 関川村 | Niigata | Iwafune | 299.61 |
| Awashimaura | 粟島浦村 | Niigata | Iwafune | 9.78 |
| Funahashi | 舟橋村 | Toyama | Nakaniikawa | 3.47 |
| Dōshi | 道志村 | Yamanashi | Minamitsuru | 79.68 |
| Oshino | 忍野村 | Yamanashi | Minamitsuru | 25.05 |
| Yamanakako | 山中湖村 | Yamanashi | Minamitsuru | 53.05 |
| Narusawa | 鳴沢村 | Yamanashi | Minamitsuru | 89.58 |
| Kosuge | 小菅村 | Yamanashi | Kitatsuru | 52.78 |
| Tabayama | 丹波山村 | Yamanashi | Kitatsuru | 101.30 |
| Kawakami | 川上村 | Nagano | Minamisaku | 209.61 |
| Minamimaki | 南牧村 | Nagano | Minamisaku | 133.09 |
| Minamiaiki | 南相木村 | Nagano | Minamisaku | 66.05 |
| Kitaaiki | 北相木村 | Nagano | Minamisaku | 56.32 |
| Aoki | 青木村 | Nagano | Chiisagata | 57.10 |
| Hara | 原村 | Nagano | Suwa | 43.26 |
| Minamiminowa | 南箕輪村 | Nagano | Kamiina | 40.99 |
| Nakagawa | 中川村 | Nagano | Kamiina | 77.05 |
| Miyada | 宮田村 | Nagano | Kamiina | 54.50 |
| Achi | 阿智村 | Nagano | Shimoina | 214.43 |
| Hiraya | 平谷村 | Nagano | Shimoina | 77.37 |
| Neba | 根羽村 | Nagano | Shimoina | 89.97 |
| Shimojō | 下條村 | Nagano | Shimoina | 38.12 |
| Urugi | 売木村 | Nagano | Shimoina | 43.43 |
| Tenryū | 天龍村 | Nagano | Shimoina | 109.44 |
| Yasuoka | 泰阜村 | Nagano | Shimoina | 64.59 |
| Takagi | 喬木村 | Nagano | Shimoina | 66.61 |
| Toyooka | 豊丘村 | Nagano | Shimoina | 76.79 |
| Ōshika | 大鹿村 | Nagano | Shimoina | 248.28 |
| Kiso | 木祖村 | Nagano | Kiso | 140.50 |
| Ōtaki | 王滝村 | Nagano | Kiso | 310.82 |
| Ōkuwa | 大桑村 | Nagano | Kiso | 234.47 |
| Omi | 麻績村 | Nagano | Higashichikuma | 34.38 |
| Ikusaka | 生坂村 | Nagano | Higashichikuma | 39.05 |
| Yamagata | 山形村 | Nagano | Higashichikuma | 24.98 |
| Asahi | 朝日村 | Nagano | Higashichikuma | 70.62 |
| Chikuhoku | 筑北村 | Nagano | Higashichikuma | 99.47 |
| Matsukawa | 松川村 | Nagano | Kitaazumi | 47.07 |
| Hakuba | 白馬村 | Nagano | Kitaazumi | 189.36 |
| Otari | 小谷村 | Nagano | Kitaazumi | 267.91 |
| Takayama | 高山村 | Nagano | Kamitakai | 98.56 |
| Kijimadaira | 木島平村 | Nagano | Shimotakai | 99.32 |
| Nozawaonsen | 野沢温泉村 | Nagano | Shimotakai | 57.96 |
| Ogawa | 小川村 | Nagano | Kamiminochi | 58.11 |
| Sakae | 栄村 | Nagano | Shimominochi | 271.66 |
| Higashishirakawa | 東白川村 | Gifu | Kamo | 87.09 |
| Shirakawa | 白川村 | Gifu | Ōno | 356.64 |
| Tobishima | 飛島村 | Aichi | Ama | 22.42 |
| Toyone | 豊根村 | Aichi | Kitashitara | 155.88 |
| Minamiyamashiro | 南山城村 | Kyoto | Sōraku | 64.11 |
| Chihayaakasaka | 千早赤阪村 | Osaka | Minamikawachi | 37.30 |
| Yamazoe | 山添村 | Nara | Yamabe | 66.52 |
| Soni | 曽爾村 | Nara | Uda | 47.76 |
| Mitsue | 御杖村 | Nara | Uda | 79.58 |
| Asuka | 明日香村 | Nara | Takaichi | 24.10 |
| Kurotaki | 黒滝村 | Nara | Yoshino | 47.70 |
| Tenkawa | 天川村 | Nara | Yoshino | 175.66 |
| Nosegawa | 野迫川村 | Nara | Yoshino | 154.90 |
| Totsukawa | 十津川村 | Nara | Yoshino | 672.38 |
| Shimokitayama | 下北山村 | Nara | Yoshino | 133.39 |
| Kamikitayama | 上北山村 | Nara | Yoshino | 274.22 |
| Kawakami | 川上村 | Nara | Yoshino | 269.26 |
| Higashiyoshino | 東吉野村 | Nara | Yoshino | 131.65 |
| Kitayama | 北山村 | Wakayama | Higashimuro | 48.20 |
| Hiezu | 日吉津村 | Tottori | Saihaku | 4.20 |
| Chibu | 知夫村 | Shimane | Oki | 13.70 |
| Shinjō | 新庄村 | Okayama | Maniwa | 67.11 |
| Nishiawakura | 西粟倉村 | Okayama | Aida | 57.97 |
| Sanagōchi | 佐那河内村 | Tokushima | Myōdō | 42.28 |
| Kitagawa | 北川村 | Kōchi | Aki | 196.73 |
| Umaji | 馬路村 | Kōchi | Aki | 165.48 |
| Geisei | 芸西村 | Kōchi | Aki | 39.60 |
| Ōkawa | 大川村 | Kōchi | Tosa | 95.27 |
| Hidaka | 日高村 | Kōchi | Takaoka | 44.85 |
| Mihara | 三原村 | Kōchi | Hata | 85.37 |
| Tōhō | 東峰村 | Fukuoka | Asakura | 51.97 |
| Aka | 赤村 | Fukuoka | Tagawa | 31.98 |
| Ubuyama | 産山村 | Kumamoto | Aso | 60.81 |
| Nishihara | 西原村 | Kumamoto | Aso | 77.22 |
| Minamiaso | 南阿蘇村 | Kumamoto | Aso | 137.32 |
| Mizukami | 水上村 | Kumamoto | Kuma | 190.96 |
| Sagara | 相良村 | Kumamoto | Kuma | 94.54 |
| Itsuki | 五木村 | Kumamoto | Kuma | 252.92 |
| Yamae | 山江村 | Kumamoto | Kuma | 121.19 |
| Kuma | 球磨村 | Kumamoto | Kuma | 207.58 |
| Himeshima | 姫島村 | Ōita | Higashikunisaki | 6.98 |
| Nishimera | 西米良村 | Miyazaki | Koyu | 271.51 |
| Morotsuka | 諸塚村 | Miyazaki | Higashiusuki | 187.56 |
| Shiiba | 椎葉村 | Miyazaki | Higashiusuki | 537.29 |
| Mishima | 三島村 | Kagoshima | Kagoshima | 31.40 |
| Toshima | 十島村 | Kagoshima | Kagoshima | 101.14 |
| Yamato | 大和村 | Kagoshima | Ōshima | 88.26 |
| Uken | 宇検村 | Kagoshima | Ōshima | 103.07 |
| Kunigami | 国頭村 | Okinawa | Kunigami | 194.80 |
| Ōgimi | 大宜味村 | Okinawa | Kunigami | 63.55 |
| Higashi | 東村 | Okinawa | Kunigami | 81.88 |
| Nakijin | 今帰仁村 | Okinawa | Kunigami | 39.93 |
| Onna | 恩納村 | Okinawa | Kunigami | 50.82 |
| Ginoza | 宜野座村 | Okinawa | Kunigami | 31.30 |
| Ie | 伊江村 | Okinawa | Kunigami | 22.78 |
| Yomitan | 読谷村 | Okinawa | Nakagami | 35.28 |
| Kitanakagusuku | 北中城村 | Okinawa | Nakagami | 11.54 |
| Nakagusuku | 中城村 | Okinawa | Nakagami | 15.53 |
| Tokashiki | 渡嘉敷村 | Okinawa | Shimajiri | 19.23 |
| Zamami | 座間味村 | Okinawa | Shimajiri | 16.74 |
| Aguni | 粟国村 | Okinawa | Shimajiri | 7.65 |
| Tonaki | 渡名喜村 | Okinawa | Shimajiri | 3.87 |
| Minamidaitō | 南大東村 | Okinawa | Shimajiri | 30.53 |
| Kitadaitō | 北大東村 | Okinawa | Shimajiri | 13.09 |
| Iheya | 伊平屋村 | Okinawa | Shimajiri | 21.82 |
| Izena | 伊是名村 | Okinawa | Shimajiri | 15.42 |
| Tarama | 多良間村 | Okinawa | Miyako | 21.99 |

== Villages in the Northern Territories ==
The following is a list of disputed villages in the southern Kuril Islands. The territories are de facto administered by Russia but are claimed by Japan as part of Nemuro Subprefecture, Hokkaido.

| Name | Japanese | Russian | Area (in km^{2}) | Island |
|---|---|---|---|---|
| Rubetsu (Pioner) | 留別村 | Рубэцу | 1,442.82 | Etorofu (Iturup) |
| Ruyobetsu (Yuzhno-Kurilsk) | 留夜別村 | Ю́жно-Кури́льск | 960.27 | Kunashiri (Kunashir) |
| Shana (Kurilsk) | 紗那村 | Кури́льск | 973.3 | Etorofu (Iturup) |
| Shibetoro (Rudnaya) | 蘂取村 | | 760.5 | Etorofu (Iturup) |
| Shikotan | 色丹村 | Шикотан | 253.33 | Shikotan |
| Tomari (Golovnino) | 泊村 | Головнино | 538.56 | Kunashiri (Kunashir) |

== See also ==
- Municipalities of Japan
- List of cities in Japan
- List of towns in Japan
- Japanese addressing system
- Edo period village
