= Nemuro Strait =

Strait separating Russia and Japan

Coordinates: 44°N 145.3°E

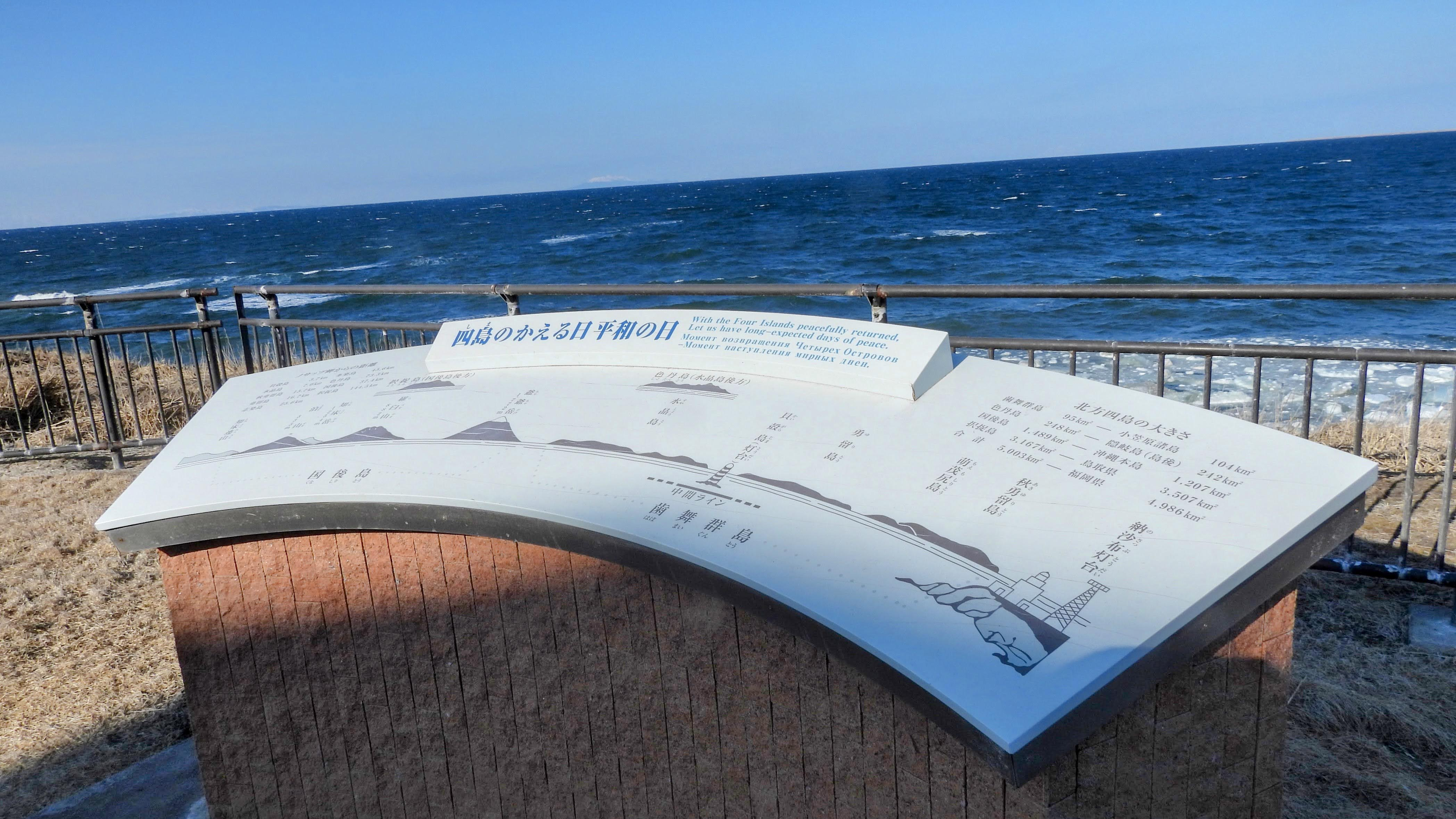
A Japanese installation at the Kuril island viewpoint in Cape Nosappu with details and claims regarding the disputed Kuril islands

Nemuro Strait (Japanese: 根室海峡), also called Notsuke Strait and Kunashirsky Strait (Russian: Кунаширский пролив), is a strait separating Kunashir Island of the Kuril Islands, Russia (claimed by Japan) from the Shiretoko Peninsula, Hokkaidō, Japan. The strait connects the Sea of Okhotsk in the north to the Izmeny Strait (пролив Измены) in the south. It is located on the southeastern borders of Sakhalin Oblast, Russia, and Nemuro Subprefecture of Japan. Along the strait runs the border between the two states.

The Strait of Nemuro is approximately 24 kilometres (15 mi) wide and 74 kilometres (46 mi) long. The maximum depth is 2,500 metres (8,200 ft). The Japanese towns of Rausu and Shibetsu overlook the strait.

The history of this land is interwoven with the abundant natural resource; salmon. As such it has come to be known as "the mecca of salmon".
