= Chishima Province =

Former province of Japan

Chishima Province (Japanese: 千島国, Hepburn: Chishima no Kuni; Japanese pronunciation: [c̟͡ɕi̥.ɕì.mä̀ (nò̞ kɯ̈̀.ɲ̟ì), -ɕí-]) was a province of Japan created during the Meiji Era. It originally contained the Kuril Islands from Kunashiri northwards, and later incorporated Shikotan as well. Its original territory is currently occupied by Russia, and its territory was renounced in the San Francisco Treaty except for the southern Kuril islands (see Kuril Islands dispute).

== History ==
After 1869, the northern Japanese island was known as Hokkaido; and regional administrative subdivisions were identified, including Chishima Province.

- 1869 Japan occupied Kunashir.
- August 15, 1869 Chishima Province created with 5 districts.
- 1872 The population was counted as 437
- November, 1875 Karafuto (Sakhalin) ceded to Russia in exchange for Kuril Islands in the Treaty of Saint Petersburg (1875). Kuril Islands divided into 3 new districts
- January, 1885 Shikotan Island transferred from Nemuro Province. Becomes Shikotan District.
- In 1945 the Soviet Union province of Sakhalin been formed which included Kunashir District.

== Districts ==
- Kunashiri (国後郡), around Kunashir Island (occupied and administered by Russia, see Kuril Island conflict)
- Etorofu (択捉郡), around Iturup island (occupied and administered by Russia)
- Furebetsu (振別郡) (dissolved April, 1923 when its villages merged with several villages in Shana and Etorofu districts to form the village of Rubetsu in Etorofu)
- Shana (紗那郡) (occupied and administered by Russia)
- Shibetoro (蘂取郡) (occupied and administered by Russia)
- Shikotan (色丹郡) (split off of Hanasaki District in 1885; currently occupied and administered by Russia)
- Uruppu (得撫郡), around Uruppu island, Acquired in Treaty of Saint Petersburg (1875), ceded in San Francisco Treaty
- Shimushiru (新知郡), around Shimushiru island, Acquired in Treaty of Saint Petersburg, ceded in San Francisco Treaty
- Shumushu (占守郡), around Shumushu island, Acquired in Treaty of Saint Petersburg, ceded in San Francisco Treaty

== Other websites ==
Media related to Chishima Province at Wikimedia Commons

- Murdoch's map of provinces, 1903
