= Shibetsu District, Hokkaido =

District in Hokkaido, Japan

Coordinates: 43°39′00″N 144°50′24″E

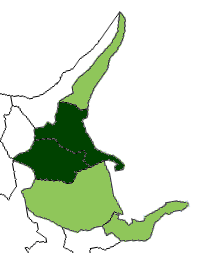
The area of Shibetsu District in Nemuro Subprefecture.

Shibetsu (標津郡, Shibetsu-gun) is a district located in Nemuro Subprefecture, Hokkaido, Japan.

== Population ==
As of 2004, its estimated population is 30,285 with a total area of 1309.44 km^{2}

== Transportation ==
Nakashibetsu Airport, the easternmost airport in Japan, is located in Nakashibetsu.

== Towns ==
- Shibetsu
- Nakashibetsu

== History ==
- 1869 - Hokkaido divided into 11 provinces and 86 districts. Shibetsu District placed under Nemuro Province.
- April 1, 1923 - Chashikotsu Village from Notsuke District, Shibetsu Village and Ichani Village from Shibetsu District, Chuurui Village, Kunnebetsu (?) Village and Sakimui?? Village (崎無意村) from Menashi District merge to form Shibetsu Village (now Shibetsu Town) in Shibetsu District.
- April 1, 1955 - Part of Betsukai Village in Notsuke District separated off to be incorporated into Nakashibetsu Town.
