= Shibetsu (town) =

Shibetsu 標津町
- Town
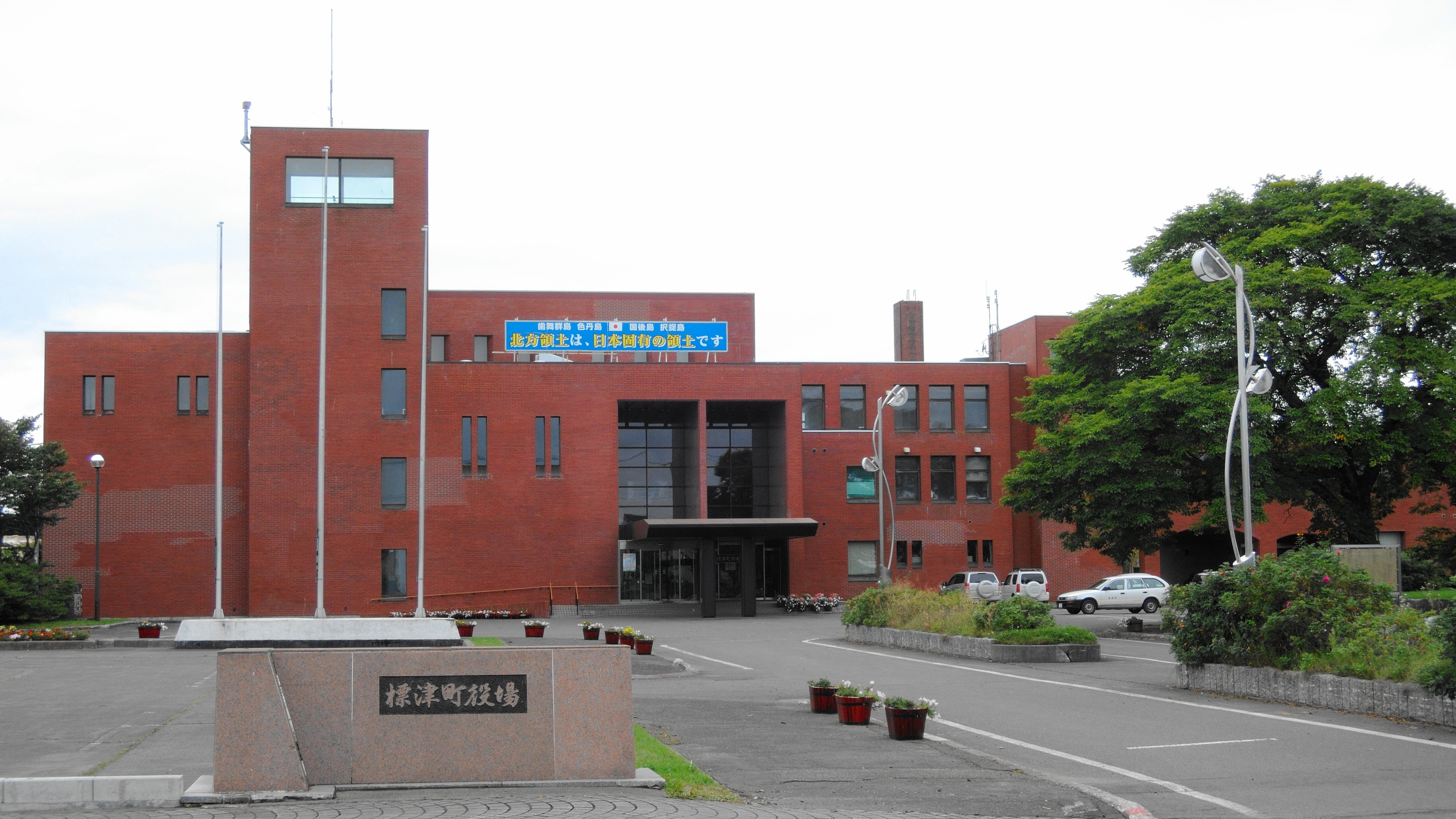
- Shibetsu town hall

- Flag Seal

- Location of Shibetsu in Hokkaido (Nemuro Subprefecture)

- Location in Japan
- Coordinates: 43°40′N 145°8′E
- Country: Japan
- Region: Hokkaido
- Prefecture: Hokkaido (Nemuro Subprefecture)
- District: Shibetsu

Area
  - Total: 624.49 km^{2} (241.12 sq mi)

Population (September 30, 2016)
  - Total: 5,374
  - Density: 8.605/km^{2} (22.29/sq mi)
- Time zone: UTC+09:00 (JST)
- Climate: Dfb
- Website: www.shibetsutown.jp

Shibetsu (標津町, Shibetsu-chō) is a town located in Nemuro Subprefecture, Hokkaido, Japan.

== Geography ==
Shibetsu is located at the northeastern end of Hokkaido, in the heart of Nemuro Subprefecture. It is a coastal town, facing the Sea of Okhotsk and backed by the mountains of the Shiretoko Peninsula. To the northeast of Shibestu lies the town of Rausu, to the northwest is Shari, to the south is Betsukai and to the west is the town of Nakashibetsu.

== Population ==
Although the town's population was 8,051 people in 1965 (Census Data), the amount has continued to decrease to 6,298 people in the year 2000 (Census Data).

The effects of depopulation and outflow of young people had left the current population at roughly 5,825 people as of Census Data for April 2009, and as of September 2016, that had fallen further to an estimated population of 5,374, within an area of 624.49 km^{2}.

== History ==
Pioneer settlers established Shibetsu during the Meiji period (1868-1912) and it quickly became a thriving fishing and farming town.

- 1901: Uembetsu Village (now Rausu) splits off.
- 1923: Shibetsu Village becomes second-class municipality.
- 1946: Nakashibetsu splits off.
- 1958: Shibetsu Village becomes Shibetsu Town.

Shibetsu made international news in 2021 when Vaas Feniks Nokard, a Russian national from Izhevsk, managed to swim 20 kilometres from the disputed Kunashiri Island to the town to seek asylum in Japan. Nokard, who intended to defect from Russia, made the crossing at night and used a compass to aid in his navigation of the Nemuro Strait.

== Economy ==
Salmon, scallop, trout and shellfish farming has been the cornerstone of Shibetsu's livelihood. As of 2009, Shibetsu's fishing industry is estimated to produce 51 billion yen annually (salmon farming making up most of it with 39 billion yen). Shibetsu is also supported by its successful dairy industry with total dairy production annually exceeding 82 billion yen (As of May 2009).

== Climate ==
Shibetsu is known for its cooler summers and icy winters. Unlike the other major islands of Japan, Hokkaido is normally not affected by the June–July rainy season. In comparison, Hokkaido is relatively less humid and has typically warm summer weather, rather than hot.

Climate data for Shibetsu (1991−2020 normals, extremes 1977−present)
Month	Jan	Feb	Mar	Apr	May	Jun	Jul	Aug	Sep	Oct	Nov	Dec	Year
Record high °C (°F)	7.9 (46.2)	9.7 (49.5)	17.6 (63.7)	30.0 (86.0)	32.1 (89.8)	33.7 (92.7)	33.9 (93.0)	35.0 (95.0)	32.7 (90.9)	26.5 (79.7)	19.0 (66.2)	15.0 (59.0)	35.0 (95.0)
Mean daily maximum °C (°F)	−1.4 (29.5)	−1.4 (29.5)	2.2 (36.0)	8.0 (46.4)	12.9 (55.2)	15.7 (60.3)	19.2 (66.6)	21.9 (71.4)	20.4 (68.7)	15.3 (59.5)	8.3 (46.9)	1.4 (34.5)	10.2 (50.4)
Daily mean °C (°F)	−5.4 (22.3)	−5.5 (22.1)	−1.6 (29.1)	3.4 (38.1)	8.1 (46.6)	11.5 (52.7)	15.4 (59.7)	18.0 (64.4)	16.1 (61.0)	10.4 (50.7)	3.8 (38.8)	−2.6 (27.3)	6.0 (42.7)
Mean daily minimum °C (°F)	−10.9 (12.4)	−11.0 (12.2)	−6.0 (21.2)	−0.6 (30.9)	4.1 (39.4)	8.4 (47.1)	12.6 (54.7)	14.9 (58.8)	11.9 (53.4)	5.2 (41.4)	−1.0 (30.2)	−7.6 (18.3)	1.7 (35.0)
Record low °C (°F)	−26.3 (−15.3)	−31.5 (−24.7)	−26.4 (−15.5)	−13.7 (7.3)	−3.2 (26.2)	−0.3 (31.5)	3.0 (37.4)	6.0 (42.8)	0.8 (33.4)	−4.4 (24.1)	−14.1 (6.6)	−19.5 (−3.1)	−31.5 (−24.7)
Average precipitation mm (inches)	38.0 (1.50)	28.0 (1.10)	54.3 (2.14)	82.8 (3.26)	109.8 (4.32)	111.9 (4.41)	123.1 (4.85)	161.2 (6.35)	174.5 (6.87)	125.2 (4.93)	78.5 (3.09)	62.4 (2.46)	1,154.4 (45.45)
Average precipitation days (≥ 1.0 mm)	8.2	6.7	8.4	10.2	10.9	10.0	12.3	13.4	12.6	10.6	9.9	9.3	122.5
Mean monthly sunshine hours	144.9	159.3	178.4	177.8	169.4	129.4	117.8	123.6	142.4	153.1	140.3	138.0	1,774.4
Source: Japan Meteorological Agency

== Transportation ==
As there is no railway line in or near Shibetsu, residents and tourists rely on airplanes and cars to travel to and from the town. Flights to and from Tokyo to nearby Nakashibetsu Airport take roughly 1 hour 40 minutes. Flights to and from Sapporo take approximately 50-60 mins. Travel to Shibetsu by bus or car from Nakashibetsu Airport takes roughly 20-30 mins. Buses depart from the Nakashibetsu Bus Terminal.

== Notable people from Shibetsu ==
- Sayuri Osuga, speed skater and cyclist
- Shizuo Shinoda, pioneer of musical roads in Japan
- Toshiko Takeya, Japanese Senator
