= Rubetsu, Hokkaido =

Former Japanese village on Iturup

Rubetsu 留別村
- Village
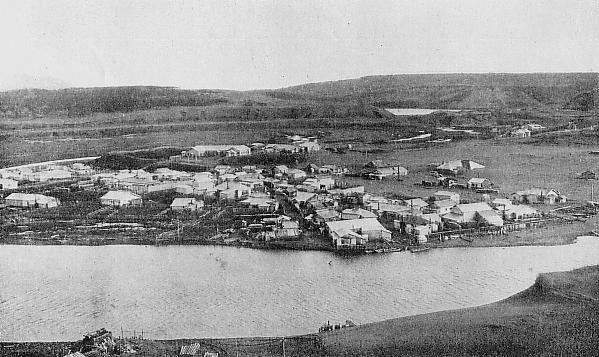
- Rubetsu, c. 1930

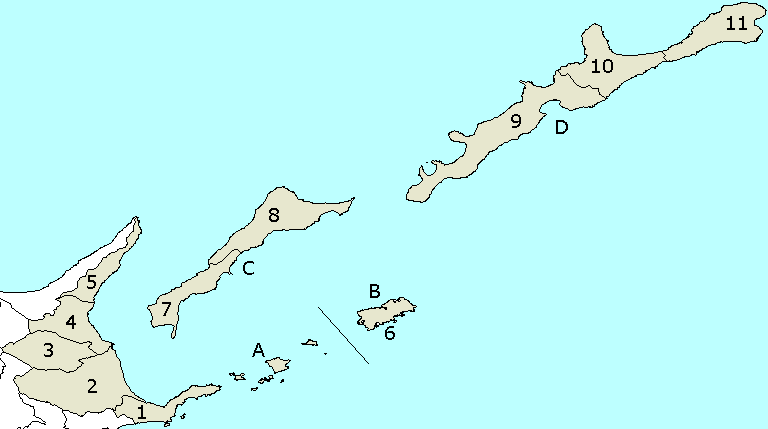
- Rubetsu is numbered 9 on this map of Nemuro Subprefecture.

- Location within Kuril Islands Location within Japan
- Coordinates: 45.0861°N 147.6941°E
- Country: Japan
- Region: Hokkaido
- Prefecture: Hokkaido
- Subprefecture: Nemuro
- District: Etorofu

Area
  - Total: 1,442.82 km^{2} (557.08 sq mi)

Population (1940)
  - Total: 2,814
  - Density: 1.950/km^{2} (5.051/sq mi)
- Time zone: UTC+11

Rubetsu (Japanese: 留別村, Hepburn: Rubetsu-mura) was a Japanese village on the island of Iturup (Etorofu in Japan), now under Russian administration. As part of the wider Kuril Islands dispute, Japan still claims it as part of the nominal Etorofu District of Nemuro Subprefecture in Hokkaido.

== History ==
The 1940 Japanese census recorded a population of 2,814 in Rubetsu.

Soviet troops arrived in Rubetsu on 28 August 1945, following the announcement of Japan's surrender on 15 August, which brought World War II to an end. The Soviet Union expelled the local populace and occupied the rest of the southern Kuril Islands by 5 September. Japan still claims the islands as its "Northern Territories" and regards the Russian presence there as an occupation.

Since 1964, former Japanese residents and their descendants have been permitted by Soviet/Russian authorities to visit family graves in the disputed territory, including in Rubetsu.

== Airbase ==
Before World War II, two naval airfields were built around Hitokappu Bay (now Kasatka Bay) in Rubetsu for the Imperial Japanese Navy: Toshimoe and Tennei. The Soviet Union upgraded Tennei into a military airbase that is now known as Burevestnik Airport.

== Adjacent municipalities ==
- Shana, Shana District
- Shibetoro, Shibetoro District
