= Japan National Route 335 =

Road in Hokkaido, Japan

National Route 335
- 国道335号
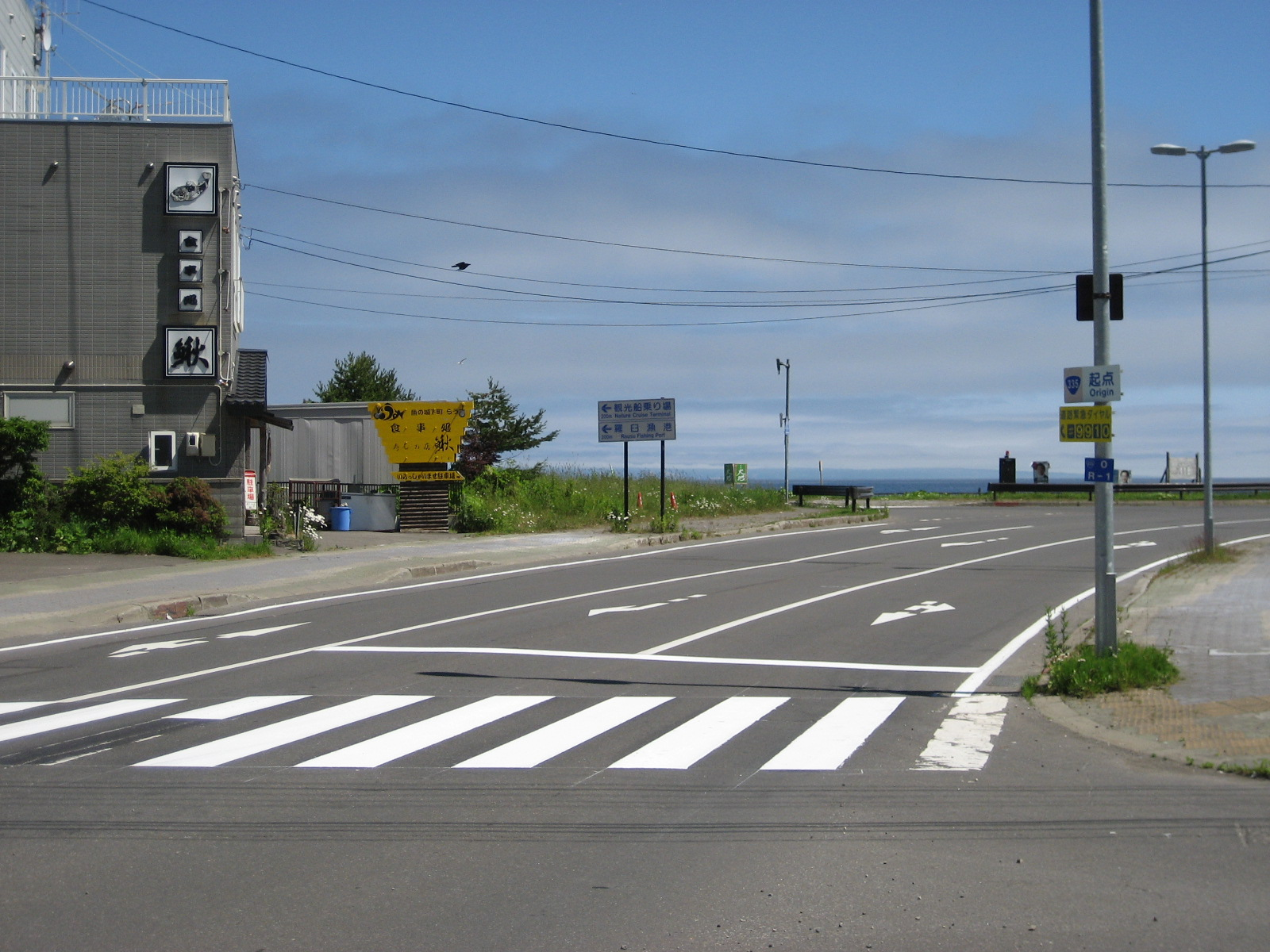

Route information
- Length: 42.4 km (26.3 mi)

Location
- Country: Japan

Highway system
- National highways of Japan; Expressways of Japan
| ← National Route 334 | → National Route 336 |

National Route 335 is a national highway of Japan connecting Rausu, Hokkaidō and Shibetsu, Hokkaidō in Japan, with a total length of 42.4 km (26.35 mi).
