= Shana, Hokkaido =

Former Japanese village on Iturup

Shana 紗那村
- Village
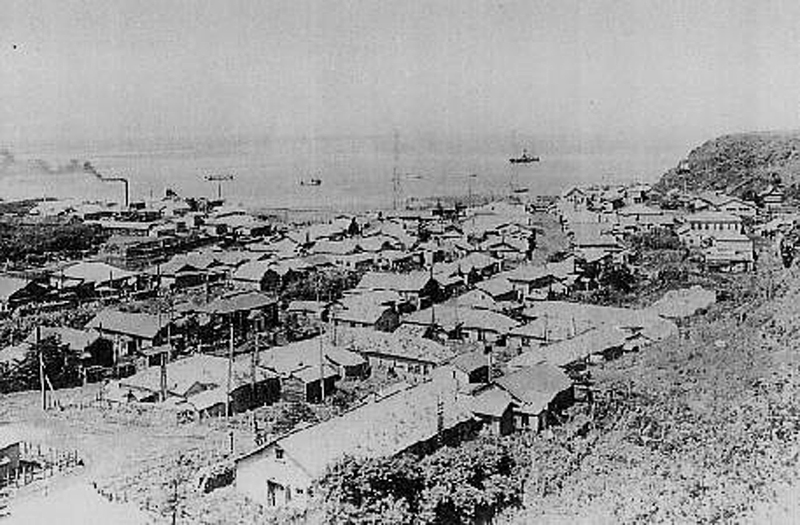
- Shana before 1945

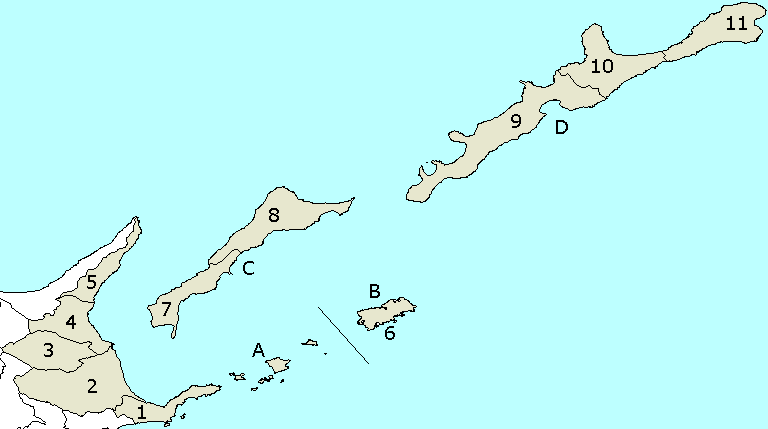
- Shana is numbered 10 on this map of Nemuro Subprefecture.

- Location within Kuril Islands Location within Japan
- Coordinates: 45°13′N 147°53′E
- Country: Japan
- Region: Hokkaido
- Prefecture: Hokkaido
- Subprefecture: Nemuro
- District: Shana

Area
  - Total: 973.30 km^{2} (375.79 sq mi)

Population (1940)
  - Total: 1,426
  - Density: 1.465/km^{2} (3.795/sq mi)
- Time zone: UTC+11

Shana (Japanese: 紗那村, Hepburn: Shana-mura) was a Japanese village on the island of Iturup (Etorofu in Japan), now under Russian administration. After the Soviet invasion and occupation of the Kuril Islands in 1945, Shana became part of Kurilsky District in Sakhalin Oblast. As part of the wider Kuril Islands dispute, Japan still claims Shana (now the town of Kurilsk) as part of the nominal Shana District of Nemuro Subprefecture in Hokkaido.

== Geography ==
The municipality has an area of 973.30 square kilometres, or 375.79 square miles. It had a population of 1,426 as of 1940.

== Adjacent municipalities ==
- Rubetsu, Etorofu District
- Shibetoro, Shibetoro District
