= Japan National Route 334 =

National highway in Japan

National Route 334
- 国道334号
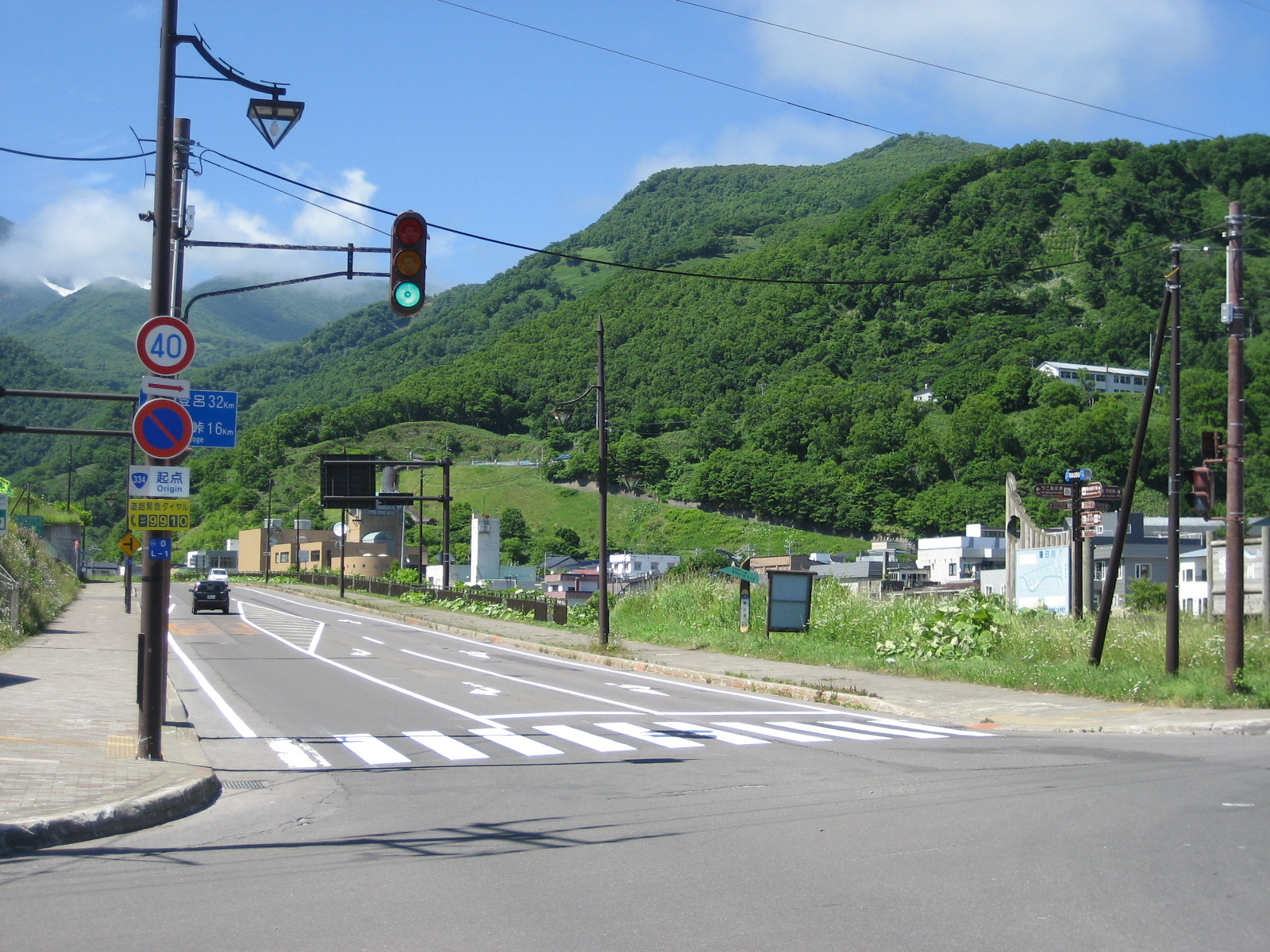

Route information
- Length: 123.3 km (76.6 mi)

Location
- Country: Japan

Highway system
- National highways of Japan; Expressways of Japan
← National Route 333	→ National Route 335

National Route 334 is a national highway of Japan connecting Rausu, Hokkaidō and Bihoro, Hokkaidō in Japan, with a total length of 123.3 km (76.62 mi).

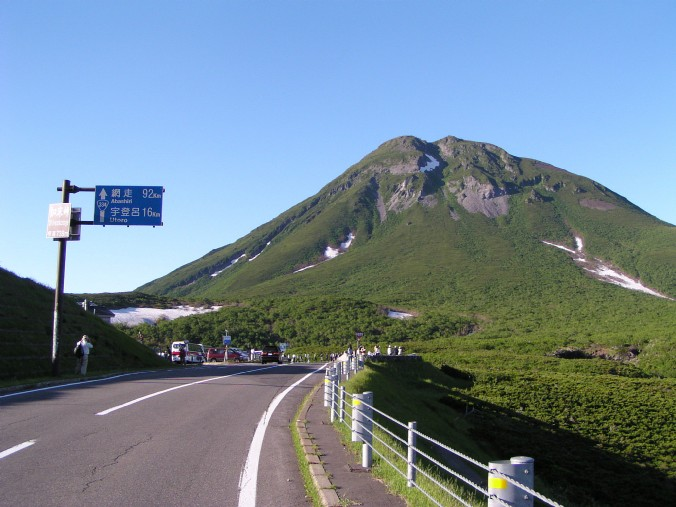
Route and Mt. Rausu
