= Nakashibetsu, Hokkaido =

Nakashibetsu 中標津町
- Town
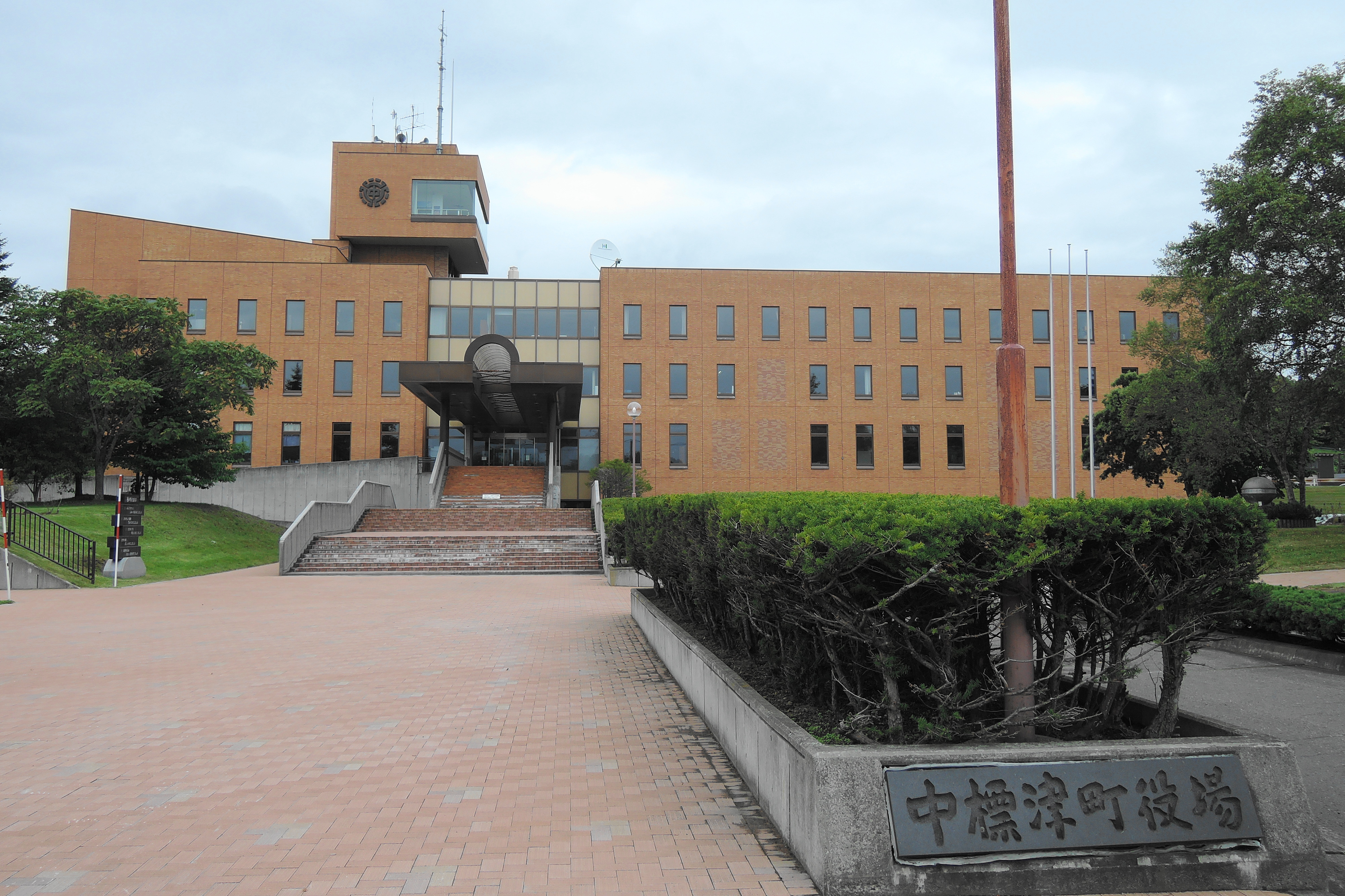
- Nakashibetsu Town Hall

- Flag Seal

- Location of Nakashibetsu in Hokkaido (Nemuro Subprefecture)

- Location in Japan
- Coordinates: 43°33′N 144°58′E
- Country: Japan
- Region: Hokkaido
- Prefecture: Hokkaido (Nemuro Subprefecture)
- District: Shibetsu

Government
  - Mayor: Minoru Kobayashi

Area
  - Total: 684.98 km^{2} (264.47 sq mi)

Population (March 31, 2014)
  - Total: 24,014
  - Density: 34.73/km^{2} (90.0/sq mi)
- Time zone: UTC+09:00 (JST)
- City hall address: 2-22 Maruyama, Nakashibetsu-chō, Shibetsu-gun, Hokkaidō; 086-1197
- Climate: Dfb
- Website: www.nakashibetsu.jp
- Symbols
- Bird: common cuckoo
- Flower: Gentiana triflora var. japonica
- Tree: White birch

Nakashibetsu (中標津町, Nakashibetsu-chō) is a town located in Nemuro Subprefecture, Hokkaido, Japan. As of March 31, 2008, it has an estimated population of 23,958, and an area of 684.98 km^{2}.

Nakashibetsu Airport, the easternmost passenger airport in Japan, is located in the town.

== History ==
- 1901 - Division opening of Nakashibetsu area. Development is begun.
- July 1, 1946 - The village of Nakashibetsu splits from Shibetsu.
- January 1, 1950 - Nakashibetsu Village becomes Nakashibetsu Town.

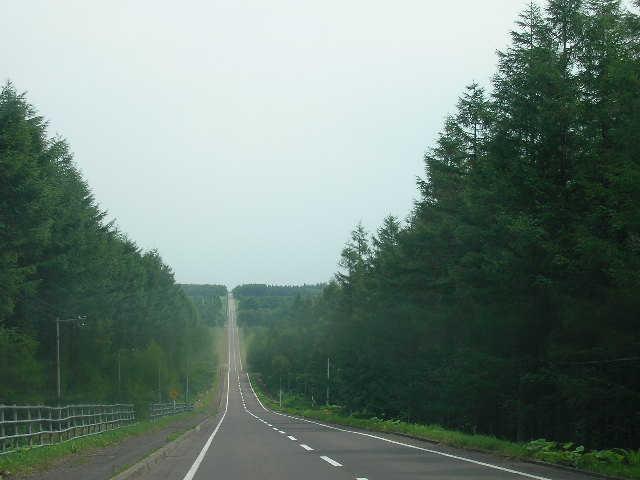
A road from Kaiyōdai hill

In 2004, there was an abortive effort to merge Nakashibetsu with the nearby town of Rausu. The new city would have been named "Higashishiretoko", but the plan was defeated in a referendum held in Nakashibetsu.

== Climate ==
Climate data for Nakashibetsu (1991−2020 normals, extremes 1977−present)
Month	Jan	Feb	Mar	Apr	May	Jun	Jul	Aug	Sep	Oct	Nov	Dec	Year
Record high °C (°F)	6.9 (44.4)	8.9 (48.0)	16.3 (61.3)	28.2 (82.8)	36.5 (97.7)	34.6 (94.3)	35.2 (95.4)	35.2 (95.4)	32.4 (90.3)	25.4 (77.7)	19.6 (67.3)	14.3 (57.7)	36.5 (97.7)
Mean daily maximum °C (°F)	−1.6 (29.1)	−1.3 (29.7)	2.5 (36.5)	9.1 (48.4)	15.0 (59.0)	18.0 (64.4)	21.4 (70.5)	22.9 (73.2)	20.6 (69.1)	15.2 (59.4)	8.1 (46.6)	1.1 (34.0)	10.9 (51.7)
Daily mean °C (°F)	−6.6 (20.1)	−6.5 (20.3)	−2.0 (28.4)	3.6 (38.5)	8.9 (48.0)	12.6 (54.7)	16.4 (61.5)	18.3 (64.9)	15.7 (60.3)	9.7 (49.5)	3.0 (37.4)	−3.7 (25.3)	5.8 (42.4)
Mean daily minimum °C (°F)	−13.2 (8.2)	−13.6 (7.5)	−7.8 (18.0)	−1.4 (29.5)	3.7 (38.7)	8.3 (46.9)	12.7 (54.9)	14.7 (58.5)	11.0 (51.8)	4.0 (39.2)	−2.5 (27.5)	−9.6 (14.7)	0.5 (33.0)
Record low °C (°F)	−28.7 (−19.7)	−32.9 (−27.2)	−26.0 (−14.8)	−14.4 (6.1)	−6.5 (20.3)	−2.0 (28.4)	1.4 (34.5)	5.7 (42.3)	−0.1 (31.8)	−6.1 (21.0)	−15.6 (3.9)	−22.2 (−8.0)	−32.9 (−27.2)
Average precipitation mm (inches)	44.0 (1.73)	32.0 (1.26)	57.5 (2.26)	84.2 (3.31)	107.5 (4.23)	103.9 (4.09)	121.6 (4.79)	175.5 (6.91)	177.2 (6.98)	134.1 (5.28)	80.5 (3.17)	65.8 (2.59)	1,183.8 (46.61)
Average snowfall cm (inches)	111 (44)	97 (38)	92 (36)	35 (14)	3 (1.2)	0 (0)	0 (0)	0 (0)	0 (0)	0 (0)	14 (5.5)	81 (32)	433 (170)
Average precipitation days (≥ 1.0 mm)	7.7	6.3	8.2	9.7	10.4	9.7	11.2	12.9	11.9	9.9	9.4	8.9	116.2
Average snowy days (≥ 3 cm)	15.0	13.1	11.2	4.6	0.3	0	0	0	0	0	1.9	10.7	56.8
Mean monthly sunshine hours	142.7	142.8	168.2	161.9	160.3	125.7	104.6	108.4	131.4	154.3	145.0	139.5	1,681.2
Source: Japan Meteorological Agency
