= Rausu, Hokkaido =

Rausu 羅臼町
- Town
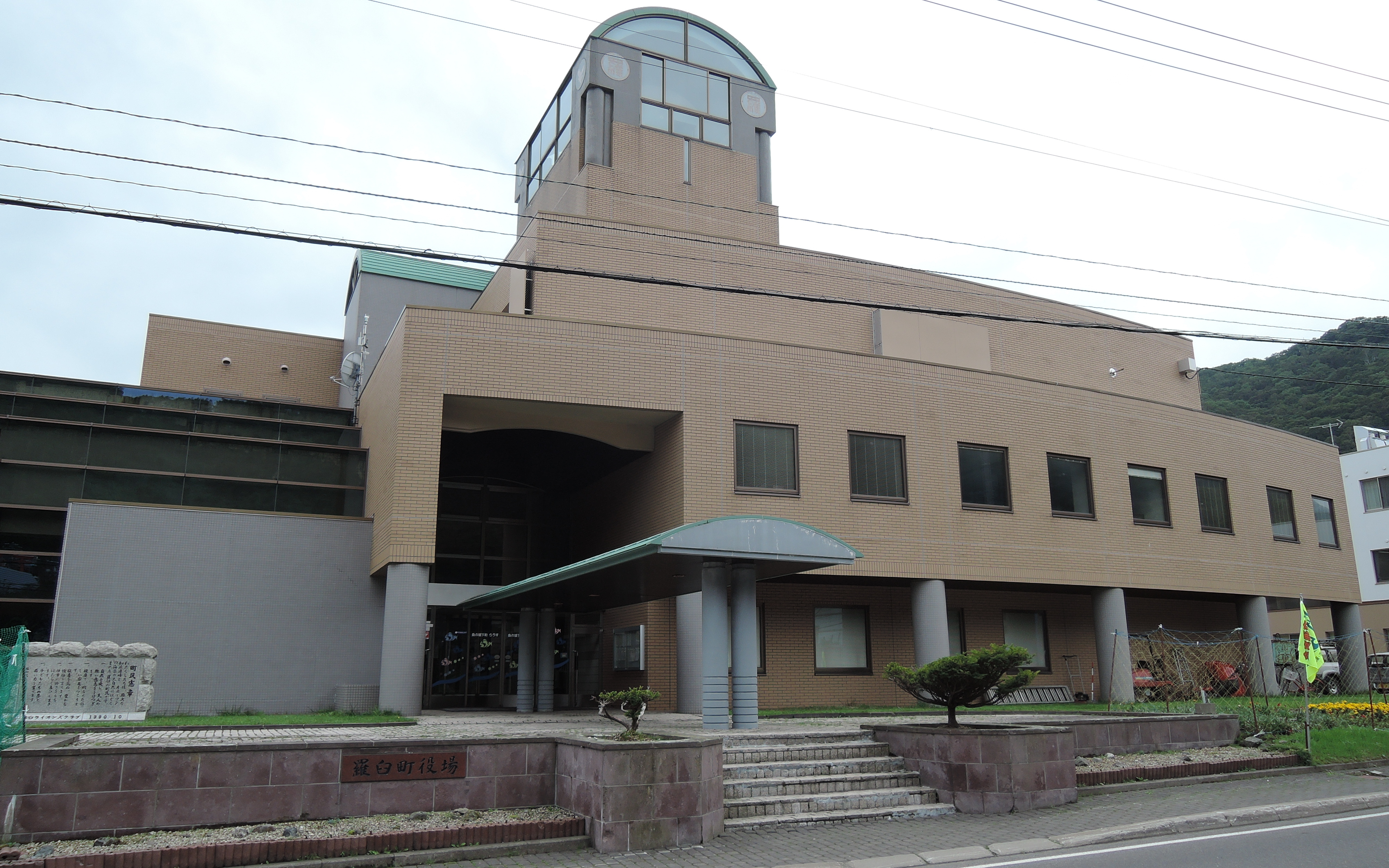
- Rausu town hall

- Flag Seal

- Location of Rausu in Hokkaido (Nemuro Subprefecture)

- Location in Japan
- Coordinates: 44°1′N 145°11′E
- Country: Japan
- Region: Hokkaido
- Prefecture: Hokkaido (Nemuro Subprefecture)
- District: Menashi

Area
  - Total: 397.88 km^{2} (153.62 sq mi)

Population (August 30, 2026)
  - Total: 4,063
  - Density: 10.21/km^{2} (26.45/sq mi)
- Time zone: UTC+09:00 (JST)
- Climate: Dfb
- Website: www.rausu-town.jp

Rausu (羅臼町, Rausu-chō) is a town located in Nemuro Subprefecture, Hokkaido, Japan. As of August 30, 2026, it has an estimated population of 4,063, and an area of 397.88 km^{2}.

The word "Rausu" originates from the Ainu word Raushi, roughly meaning "Low-land" or "Place of men with beast-like spirit".

The town occupies the southern half of the Shiretoko Peninsula. Kunashir Island, one of the four disputed Kuril Islands, can be seen from the town.

== Geography ==
Rausu is located on the east end of Hokkaido's Shiretoko Peninsula. It is situated on the southeast corner of the peninsula facing the Nemuro Strait. The town stretches along and narrow strip of land, extending 64 km (40 mi) from southwest to northeast. The Shiretoko mountain range extends north on the peninsula to the sea where it forms steep cliffs. The Shiretoko mountain range is the source for myriad rivers, that all empty into the sea. Village communities are found mostly on the coast line at the mouths of these rivers. The "downtown" of Rausu is at the mouth of Rausu River where it joins the sea at Rausu Harbor.

Two access points to Rausu via highway are through Shibetsu in the south or through Shari on the west side of the Shiretoko Peninsula. From Shibetsu, National Highway 335 (the Kunashiri Highway) extends northwards along the coast into Rausu at which point it crosses the peninsula heading west, over the Shiretoko mountain range (the Shiretoko Pass). The Shiretoko Pass leads into Shari and becomes National Highway 334 (Shiretoko Crossing). Some sections of both highways (334 and 335) feature steep precipices just off the shoulder and may prove dangerous. There are also a number of tunnels along both highways. Rausu is about 70 km (43 mi) northeast from Nakashibetsu airport. It is 120 km (75 mi) northeast of Kushiro City.

- Mountains: Mount Rausu (1,660m/ 1.03 miles); Mount Shiretoko Sulphur Spring (1,563m/ 0.97miles)
- Major rivers: Rausu River
- Major lakes and marshes: Lake Rausu

=== Climate ===
Climate data for Rausu (2005−2020 normals, extremes 2005−present)
Month	Jan	Feb	Mar	Apr	May	Jun	Jul	Aug	Sep	Oct	Nov	Dec	Year
Record high °C (°F)	7.0 (44.6)	9.6 (49.3)	13.9 (57.0)	22.5 (72.5)	29.4 (84.9)	30.9 (87.6)	30.7 (87.3)	32.4 (90.3)	29.8 (85.6)	23.1 (73.6)	19.2 (66.6)	12.7 (54.9)	32.4 (90.3)
Mean daily maximum °C (°F)	−1.8 (28.8)	−1.8 (28.8)	2.0 (35.6)	6.9 (44.4)	12.2 (54.0)	15.2 (59.4)	18.9 (66.0)	21.3 (70.3)	19.5 (67.1)	14.1 (57.4)	7.5 (45.5)	1.4 (34.5)	9.6 (49.3)
Daily mean °C (°F)	−4.5 (23.9)	−4.8 (23.4)	−1.1 (30.0)	2.9 (37.2)	7.8 (46.0)	11.5 (52.7)	15.4 (59.7)	17.8 (64.0)	15.7 (60.3)	10.1 (50.2)	4.1 (39.4)	−1.4 (29.5)	6.1 (43.0)
Mean daily minimum °C (°F)	−7.5 (18.5)	−8.2 (17.2)	−4.3 (24.3)	−0.4 (31.3)	4.2 (39.6)	8.6 (47.5)	12.7 (54.9)	15.0 (59.0)	12.2 (54.0)	6.2 (43.2)	0.7 (33.3)	−4.4 (24.1)	2.9 (37.2)
Record low °C (°F)	−15.7 (3.7)	−17.3 (0.9)	−11.7 (10.9)	−10.1 (13.8)	−1.5 (29.3)	1.0 (33.8)	5.7 (42.3)	8.7 (47.7)	5.4 (41.7)	−1.9 (28.6)	−8.9 (16.0)	−13.4 (7.9)	−17.3 (0.9)
Average precipitation mm (inches)	89.7 (3.53)	66.6 (2.62)	93.9 (3.70)	111.7 (4.40)	144.0 (5.67)	119.4 (4.70)	125.4 (4.94)	200.5 (7.89)	204.7 (8.06)	214.1 (8.43)	150.7 (5.93)	133.8 (5.27)	1,657.1 (65.24)
Average snowfall cm (inches)	149 (59)	119 (47)	95 (37)	38 (15)	2 (0.8)	0 (0)	0 (0)	0 (0)	0 (0)	1 (0.4)	30 (12)	114 (45)	545 (215)
Average precipitation days (≥ 1.0 mm)	13.6	9.0	8.9	9.3	11.3	9.7	10.7	12.8	13.5	13.8	14.8	16.1	143.5
Average snowy days (≥ 3 cm)	16.1	11.8	11.1	5.1	0.3	0	0	0	0	0.1	3.6	13.2	61.3
Mean monthly sunshine hours	88.3	117.3	139.0	153.1	164.9	128.4	114.7	108.0	124.6	134.8	104.8	93.0	1,473.2
Source: Japan Meteorological Agency

=== Adjoining municipalities ===
- Nemuro Subprefecture

Shibetsu

- Okhotsk Subprefecture

Shari District: Shari

== History ==
- 1901 (Meiji 34) — Uebetsu Village split from Shibetsu.
- 1923 (Taishō 12) — Uebetsu becomes second-class municipality.
- 1930 (Shōwa 5) — Uebetsu is renamed Rausu Village.
- 1961 (Shōwa 36) — Rausu becomes the Rausu Town.

In 2004, there were talks held in Nakashibetsu amongst all the municipalities in the area to form one large township called East Shiretoko. Soon thereafter local residents were polled regarding the proposal. The faction in favor of this change did not receive support and thus abandoned the effort.

== Local economy ==
Rausu's local economy consists of three main sources: the fishing industry, Shiretoko tourism, and local businesses.

=== Fishing industry ===
Rausu is primarily a fishing town. One third of residents are supported by the fishing industry. The main intake by the fishing industry consists of kichiji rockfish (Sebastolobus macrochir), Alaska Pollock (Theragra chalcogramma), konbu kelp, salmon, squid, and sea urchin. Particularly famous is Rausu konbu (Rausu kelp). There is no other place in Japan to harvest sea urchin from winter to summer other than Rausu. As for agriculture, in southern Rausu there is some dairy farming, but no land suitable for growing rice, produce, or other large scale agriculture. The lumber industry does not have much of a presence either (as it does in the rest of Hokkaido). 70% of the town's land is lush mountain forest, but it is mostly a part of the Shiretoko National Park.

=== Local business ===
Rausu's second major source of economic income is not any one specific industry, but rather the mix of local retail, municipal employment, food and beverage industry, etc.

=== Shiretoko National Park ===
The third major source of revenue for Rausu is related to Shiretoko National Park. The splendor of Shiretoko’s forests and the abundance of aquatic life in the Nemuro Strait form the basis of the local tourist industry. Due to the widening of Kunashiri Highway, in recent years whale and dolphin watching have become popular in the summer, whereas viewing Steller’s sea eagle, white-tailed (sea) eagles, (earless) seals, and drift-ice are popular in the winter. These activities are usually done by chartered cruises that cater to researchers, photographers, and bird watchers. Rausu is known for fresh rockfish, early-season salmon and salmon eggs, Alaskan pollock, squid, and sea urchin. The town has many bed-and-breakfasts, lodges, onsen hotels, restaurants, and bars. There is also a roadside station that sells local Shiretoko-area products.

== Local business groups ==
- Rausu Deep Ocean Fishing Association
- Rausu Fisherman’s Association

=== Municipal services ===
==== Japan Post ====
- Misaki-chō annex of the Rausu Post Office
- Minehama limited-service mail center
- Rausu Post Office (serves as a distribution point for Nakashibetsu Japan Postal Service Center hub)
- Yagihama annex of the Rausu Post Office

==== Police force ====
- Rausu Police Department is a sub-station of Nakashibetsu Police Department

==== Japanese military/Coast Guard presence ====
Due to the close proximity of Russia and potential fishing-rights disputes, the Japanese Coast Guard maintains a presence in Rausu year round. Coast Guard vessels are regularly docked in Rausu Harbor, with the personnel barracks nearby.
The Japanese Self-Defense Force maintains a permanent presence in the town.

== Education system ==
Like most high schools in Japan, the local senior high school falls under the administration of the prefectural board of education, while the local middle and elementary schools are operated by the local board of education.

=== Senior high schools ===
- Rausu Senior High School

=== Middle/junior high schools ===
- Chienbetsu Middle School (Closed Spring 2008 due to low population)
- Rausu Middle School
- Shunshō Middle School
- Uebetsu Middle School (Closed Spring 2010 due to low population)
- Tobinitai Middle School (Closed Spring 2010 due to low population)

=== Elementary schools ===
- Rausu Elementary School
- Shunshō Elementary School
- Tobinitai Middle School (Closed Spring 2010 due to low population)
- Uebetsu Elementary School (Closed Spring 2010 due to low population)

The Rausu Board of Education has participated in the Ministry of Education, Culture, Sports, Science and Technology's (MEXT) Japan Exchange and Teaching (JET) Programme since summer 1993. The JET program helps place native English speakers in both prefectural and local boards of education to work as Assistant Language Teachers (ALT) with the goal of developing Japan's foreign language education.

== Transportation ==
=== Airports ===
- Nemuro-Nakashibetsu Airport (Nakashibetsu, Hokkaido)

=== Buses ===
- There is a regional bus route from Kushiro Eki-Mae Station to the center of Rausu operated by Akan Bus. Service is limited to four round-trip journeys a day.
- There is a line from Utoro Onsen in Shari to Rausu during the summer operated by the regional Shari Bus and Akan Bus companies.

=== Major roads ===
==== National highways ====
- National Highway 334 (Road Closed from approximately mid-November to April, making Rausu only accessible via Shibetsu/ Highway 335)
- National Highway 335

==== Prefectural highways ====
- Hokkaidō Route 87 (Shiretoko National Park—Rausu Drive)

==== Roadside stations ====
- Shiretoko-Rausu

== Scenic and historical places ==
=== Festivals/events ===
Rausu observes most of the same national Japanese traditional holidays found throughout the country, such as Children's Day, Hatsumōde, etc. However, some festivals, like O-bon and Coming of Age Day are celebrated earlier due to the fishing industry and the large number of college students enrolled in schools in Honshū. Other annual festivals/events include:

- Isaribi Festival 漁火祭り (mid-September)
- Rausu Ekiden Race (October)
- Rausu Art and Culture Festival (early to mid-November)
- Middle School Sports Day (first weekend of June)
- Elementary School Field Day (second weekend of June)
- Shiretoko Biraki Festival 知床開き祭り (late June): a fireworks, yosakoi, and traditional dance festival celebrating summer
- Rausu Shrine Festival 神社祭, jinja-sai (July 1–3): a Shintō mikoshi festival unique to Rausu

==== World Cultural and Natural Heritage (UNESCO) ====
- Shiretoko Park (UNESCO World Heritage Site)
- Rausu Luminous Moss – roped-off walking path to guide visitors through this natural site
- Rausu Geyser – marked trail/designated viewing area for visitors
- Shiretoko Ibuki-Taru Club – percussion group that plays casks made of Chinese juniper, using wooden mallets as beaters (almost like Japanese taiko drums.)
- Remains of the former Uebetsu Shrine – a Rausu historical site
- Remains of Kyuuemon Kan (久右衛門の澗)

==== Sightseeing ====
- Rausu National Park
- Mount Rausu
- Shiokaze “Sea Breeze” Park – located at Rausu harbor. From here one can view the Northern Territories (now a part of Russia).
- Luminous Moss (a protected moss-species) – the novel Hikari Goke is about this site
- Rausu Onsen: kuma no yu, or “bear hot-spring”
- From the television series, “Kita no Kuni Kara: 2002 Yuigon” (Japanese: 北の国から2002遺言, “From the Northern Country: Last Word 2002”) there is the restaurant Jun no Banya (also known as Kamoiunbe-gawa)
- Seseki Onsen – an onsen on the coast that is only accessible at low tide (it is submerged at high tide). It was also used as a location in the Japanese TV drama “Kita no Kuni Kara: 2002 Yuigon”.
- Aidomari Onsen
- Shiretoko Point
- Whale and dolphin watching, accessible via a variety of charted tour boats
