= Shikotan, Hokkaido =

Village in Shikotan District, Japan

Shikotan 色丹村
- Village
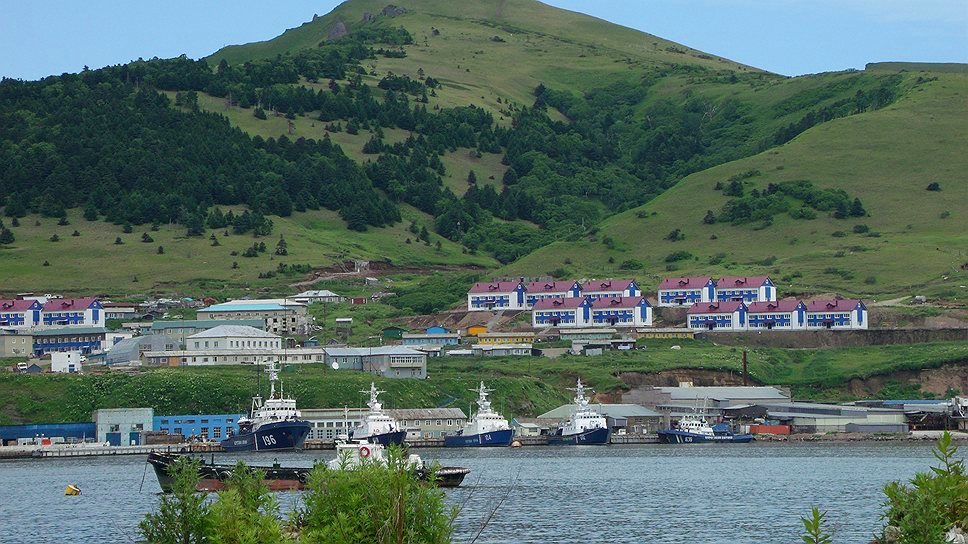
- Port of Malokurilskoye

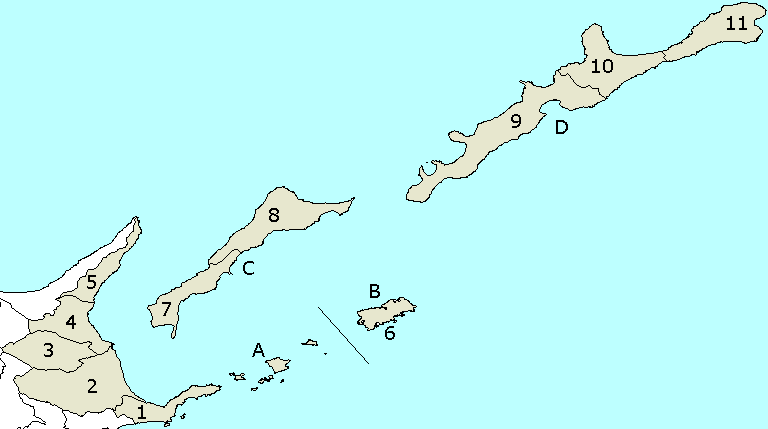
- The municipality is labeled here as number 6.
- Country: Japan; Russia
- Region/Federal District: Hokkaido; Far Eastern Federal District
- Prefecture/Federal Subject: Hokkaido Prefecture (Nemuro Subprefecture); Sakhalin
- District/District: Shikotan; Yuzhno-Kurilsky District

Area
  - Total: 253.33 km^{2} (97.81 sq mi)

Population (1945)
  - Total: 1,499
  - Density: 5.917/km^{2} (15.33/sq mi)
- Time zone: UTC+11 (MSK+8)

Shikotan (Japanese: 色丹村, Shikotan-mura, Russian: Шикотан) is a notional village administrative unit claimed by Japan in Shikotan District, Hokkaido. It is located in the disputed Northern Territories area of the Kuril Islands. Shikotan is currently administered by Russia as part of Yuzhno-Kurilsky District in Sakhalin Oblast, although Japan continues to claim it as part of their own territory.

== Etymology ==
The name was originally called Shakotan and it comes from the Ainu language.

== Geography ==
The municipality and island is formed by the volcanic rock and sandstone of the Upper Cretaceous and Cenozoic periods. There are two extinct volcanoes on Shikotan: Mount Tomari and Mount Notoro.
