= Mount Shibetsu =

Mountain in Japan

- Shibetsu-dake
- Location within Hokkaido

Highest point
- Listing: List of mountains and hills of Japan by height
- Coordinates: 43°40′5.2″N 144°42′16.8″E

Geography
- Location: Hokkaido, Japan
- Parent range: Shiretoko Peninsula

Geology
- Rock age: Middle Pleistocene
- Mountain type: stratovolcano

Mount Shibetsu (標津岳, Shibetsu-dake) is a volcano located on the Shiretoko Peninsula in Hokkaido, northeastern Japan. It has an elevation of 1061 meters.
