= Menashi District, Hokkaido =

Coordinates: 44.023°N 145.142°E

Menashi 目梨郡
- District
- Etymology: "To the east"
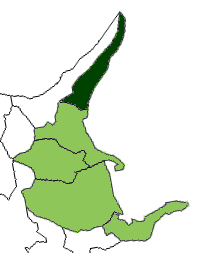
- The area of Menashi District in Nemuro Subprefecture.
- Country: Japan
- Prefecture: Hokkaido
- Subprefecture: Nemuro

Area
  - Total: 397.88 km^{2} (153.62 sq mi)

Population (2010)
  - Total: 6,069
  - Density: 15.25/km^{2} (39.51/sq mi)

Menashi (目梨郡, Menashi-gun) is a district located in Nemuro Subprefecture, Hokkaido, Japan. As of 2010, its population is estimated at 6,069 and its area is 397.88 km^{2}, with a population density of 15.3/km^{2} (according to the Basic Resident Register 住民基本台帳, 31 March 2010.) The origin of the name "Menashi" comes from the Ainu word menashi, meaning "to the east". The local government in Nemuro, which includes Shiretoko and The Northern Territories, decided to name the whole region "Menashi". Menashi's only town is Rausu. The district was one of the settings of the Menashi-Kunashiri Battle of 1789.

== Towns ==
- Rausu

== History ==
During the Edo period (1603–1868), the ruling Tokugawa shōgun allowed the Matsumae clan (Matsumae han 松前藩) to settle in the Menashi region, which was then named Nemuro. According to the Matsumae clan's Chronicles of Shiragi (Shiragi no kiroku 新羅の記録), from the first year of the Genna era to about Genna 7 (1615–1622) the region's inhabitants (referred to as the Ezo-people, or "Ainu") traded with the Matsumae clan, noting that the Matsumae received 100 small boats worth of eagle feathers and sea otter pelts.

In the first year of the Kansei Era (1789) the native inhabitants rebelled in Kunashiri and Menashi resulting in the Menashi–Kunashir rebellion, also known as the Kansei-Ezo Uprising (kansei ezo hōki 寛政蝦夷蜂起) and the deaths of a large number of Japanese people (wajin 和人.) It was during this time that Rausu Onsen was discovered.

Toward the end of the Edo period, Menashi was a part of the general East Ezo (higashi ezo 東蝦夷) region. The shōgun assumed control and established more of a presence in the Menashi region around 1799 (Kansei 11) due to Russia's menacing southern expansion policies. Menashi was then briefly returned to the jurisdiction of the Matsumae clan in c. 1821 (Bunsei 4.) In c. 1855 (Ansei 2) Menashi fell under the domain of the shōgun once again via the Aizu clan, who ruled the area severely. It was during the Ansei era (1854–1860) that Rausu Shrine was established.

=== 1800s ===
- 1856 to 1857—there was a sulfur spring eruption on the Shiretoko Peninsula.
- 1869—the official government withdrew from the area and Menashi became absorbed by the Hokkaido-Nemuro region.
- 8 February 1882—the region known as Haishichi Prefecture 廃使置県 became Nemuro Prefecture.

=== 1900s ===
- 1 April 1923—Shibetsu District's Shibetsu Village 標津村 and Ichani Village 伊茶仁村 joined with Notsuke District's Chashikotsu Village 茶志骨村 to form Shibetsu Village, Shibetsu District, thus separating from Menashi. The second class government municipality Uebetsu Village was then established consisting of Chūrui Village 忠類村, Kunnebetsu Village 薫別村, and Sakimui Village 崎無意村.
- 1 July 1930—Uebetsu Village is renamed Rausu Village.
- 1 August 1961—Rausu Village formed its own town administration, renaming the village Rausu Town.
