= Golovnino =

Village on Kunashir of the Kuril Islands

Golovnino Головнино
- Village

Other transcription(s)
  - Japanese: 泊村 (Tomari-mura)
  - Ainu: トマリ (Tomari)
- Interactive map of Golovnino
- Location of Golovnino Golovnino (Sakhalin Oblast)
- Coordinates: 43°44′16″N 145°31′9″E
- Country: Russia
- Federal subject: Sakhalin Oblast
- Administrative district: Yuzhno-Kurilsky District

Government
  - Body: Golovninskiy Rural Council

Area
  - Total: 538.56 km^{2} (207.94 sq mi)

Population (2010 Census)
  - Total: 102
  - Estimate (2021): 153 (+50%)
  - Density: 0.189/km^{2} (0.491/sq mi)

Municipal status
  - Urban okrug: Yuzhno-Kurilsky Urban Okrug
- Time zone: UTC+11 (MSK+8)
- Postal code: 694502
- Dialing code: +7 42455
- OKTMO ID: 64756000131

Golovnino (Russian: Головнино) is a village on the southern tip of Kunashir, the southernmost island in the Kuril Island chain. Administratively, it is classified as a rural locality (a selo) and is part of Yuzhno-Kurilsky District, one of the seventeen districts of Russia's Sakhalin Oblast.

During Japanese rule it was known as Tomari (Japanese: 泊村, Hepburn: Tomari-mura; Ainu: トマリ) and was the administrative seat of Kunashiri District, Hokkaido. Following Japan's defeat in World War II, the Soviet Union occupied the Kuril Islands and expelled the Japanese population. Japan still claims sovereignty over the village and the rest of Kunashir as part of Nemuro Subprefecture of Hokkaido.

== Etymology ==
The village was originally named Tomari, meaning "bay" in the language of the indigenous Ainu people. On 15 October 1947, following the Soviets' occupation of the Kuril Islands, the Presidium of the Supreme Soviet of the Russian SFSR renamed the village Golovnino in honour of Russian vice admiral Vasily Golovnin. Golovnin was an explorer of the Russian Far East who had been captured and held captive by the Japanese from June 1811 to October 1813 after he landed on Kunashir, in what became known as the Golovnin Incident.

== Administration ==
Golovnino has been part of Yuzhno-Kurilsky District in Sakhalin Oblast since June 2006. The Golovninskiy Rural Council is the governing body of a dozen settlements in southern Kunashir, with Golovnino as the principal settlement.

Japan does not recognize Russian sovereignty over Kunashir and claims Golovnino as the village of Tomari, in Kunashiri District, Nemuro Subprefecture, Hokkaido. The claimed boundaries of Tomari encompass the southern half of Kunashir and include the much larger settlement of Yuzhno-Kurilsk, previously a smaller Japanese village named Furukamappu (古釜布).

== Demographics ==
In 1945, before the Soviets expelled the Japanese population, Tomari had 4,864 residents living in 894 households.

The 2010 Russian census recorded a population of 102 in Golovnino. This figure rose to 153 in 2021. The Russian government has given abandoned houses and land to citizens willing to move to Golovnino on a permanent or semi-permanent basis.

== Economy ==
Golovnino is primarily a fishing village, with the waters surrounding it attracting pearl hunters as well. A state-owned farm named Dalniy (the Russian name for Dalian, China) operated near Golovnino. In 1956 the farm had 235 hectares of arable land; this grew to 415 hectares by 1990. The farm was destroyed beyond repair by the 1994 Kuril Islands earthquake.

== Transportation ==
Golovnino is connected to Yuzhno-Kurilsk by a 62-kilometre unpaved road.
