= Nemuro Subprefecture =

Subprefecture of Hokkaido, Japan

Coordinates: 43°19′49″N 145°35′04″E

Nemuro Subprefecture 根室振興局
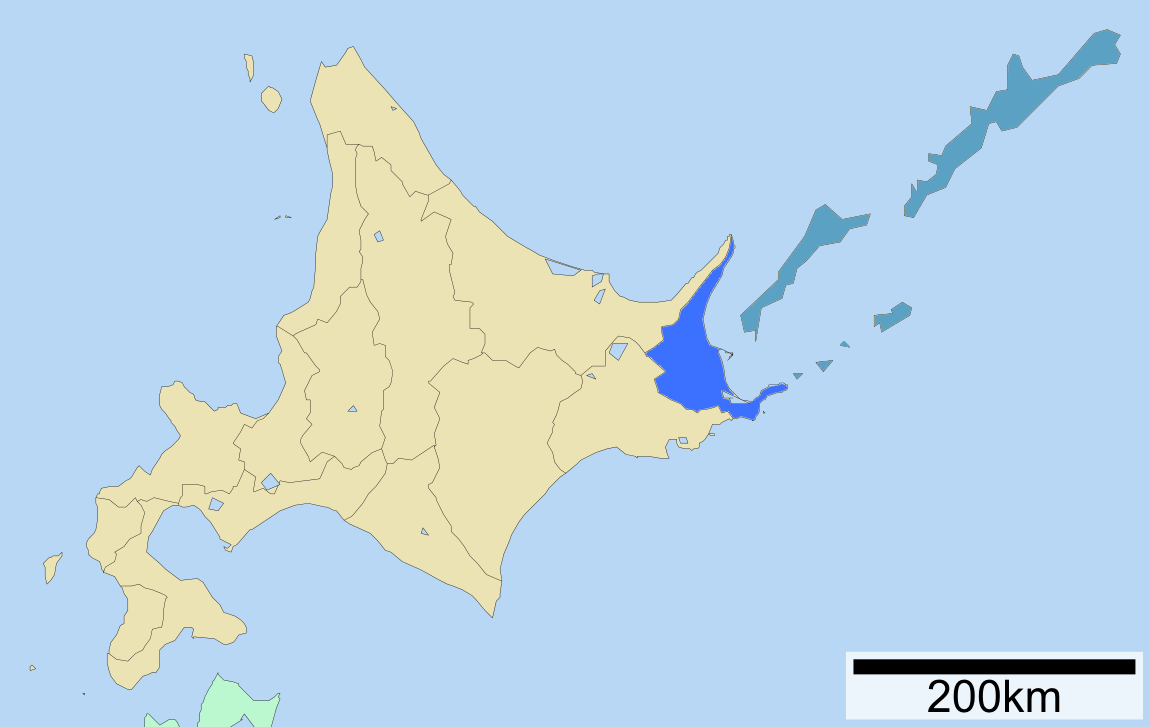
- Prefecture: Hokkaido
- Capital: Nemuro

Area
  - Total: 3,406.23 km^{2} (1,315.15 sq mi)

Population (March 2009)
  - Total: 84,035
  - Density: 24.671/km^{2} (63.898/sq mi)
- Website: nemuro.pref.hokkaido.lg.jp

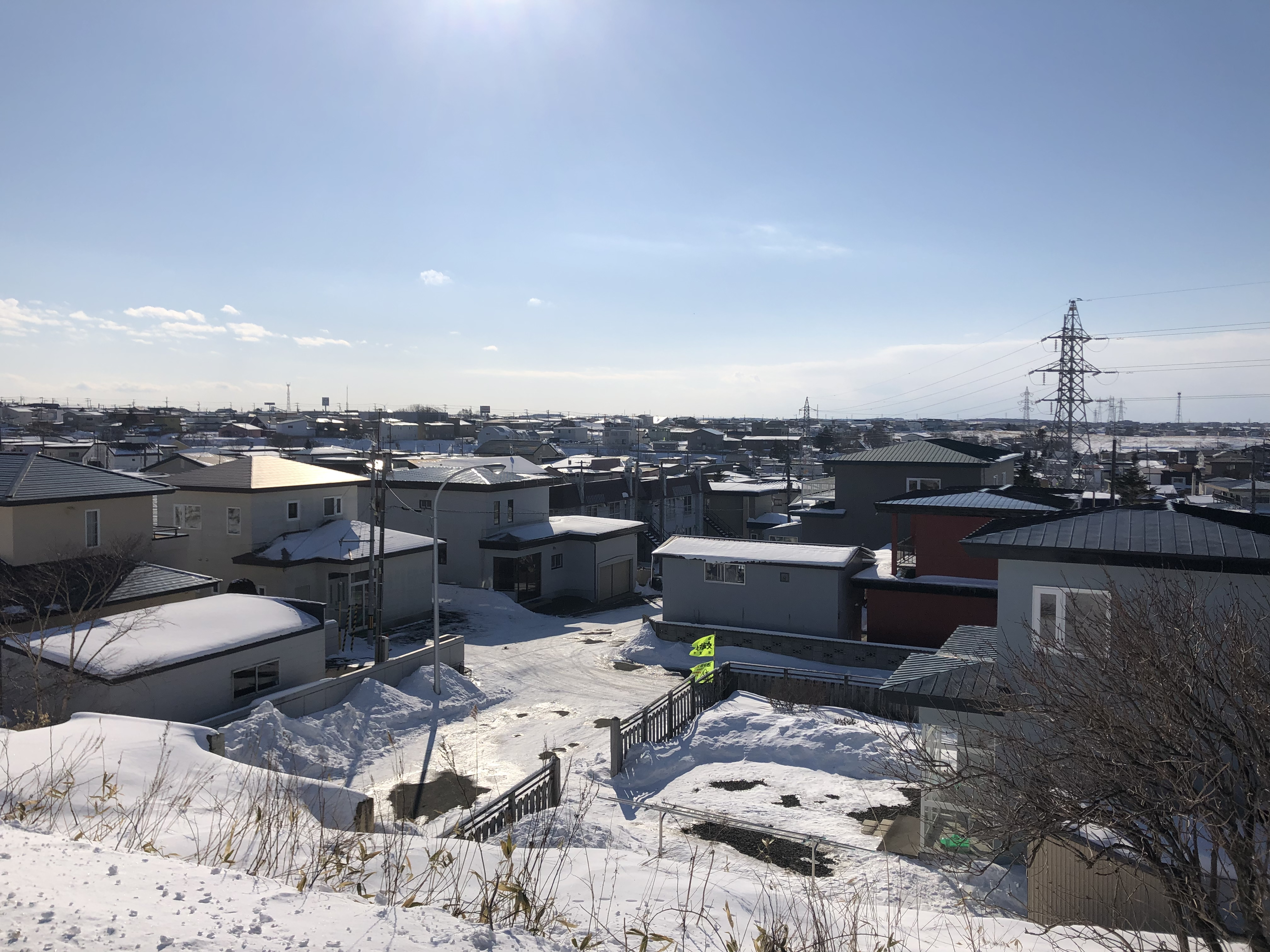
Nemuro City in Hokkaido.

Nemuro (Japanese: 根室振興局, Hepburn: Nemuro-shinkō-kyoku) is a subprefecture of Hokkaido Prefecture, Japan. Japan claims the southern parts of the disputed Kuril Islands (known as the Northern Territories in Japan) as part of this subprefecture.

As of March 2009, the subprefecture has an estimated population of 84,035, and an area of 3406.23 km².

Nakashibetsu Airport, the easternmost airport in Japan, is located in the town of Nakashibetsu, Shibetsu District.

== History ==
- November 1897: Nemuro Subprefecture established.
- November 1897: Shana Subprefecture established.
- December 1903: Shana Subprefecture and Nemuro Subprefecture merged.
- August 1945: Soviet Union occupies the Kuril Islands.

== Geography ==
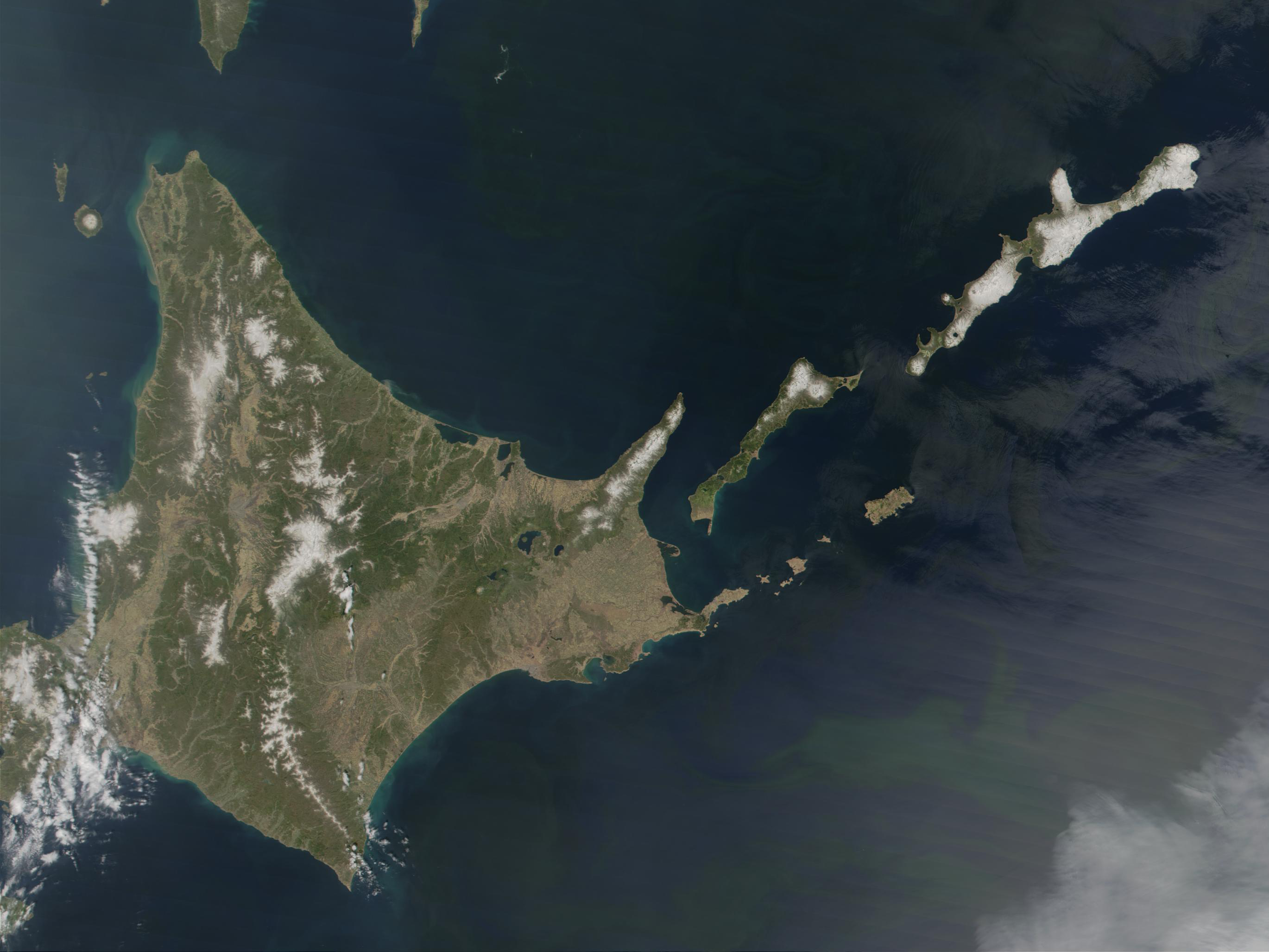
Satellite photo of Hokkaido and the southern Kuril islands (Northern Territories)

=== Municipalities ===
Name		Type	Area (km^{2})	Population	District	Map
Rōmaji	Kanji	Type	Area (km^{2})	Population	District	Map
Betsukai	別海町	Town	1,320.15	15,179	Notsuke District	
Nakashibetsu	中標津町	Town	684.98	24,014	Shibetsu District	
Nemuro (capital)	根室市	City	512.63	27,109	no district	
Rausu	羅臼町	Town	397.88	5,395	Menashi District	
Shibetsu	標津町	Town	624.49	5,374	Shibetsu District	

=== Districts in the Northern Territories ===
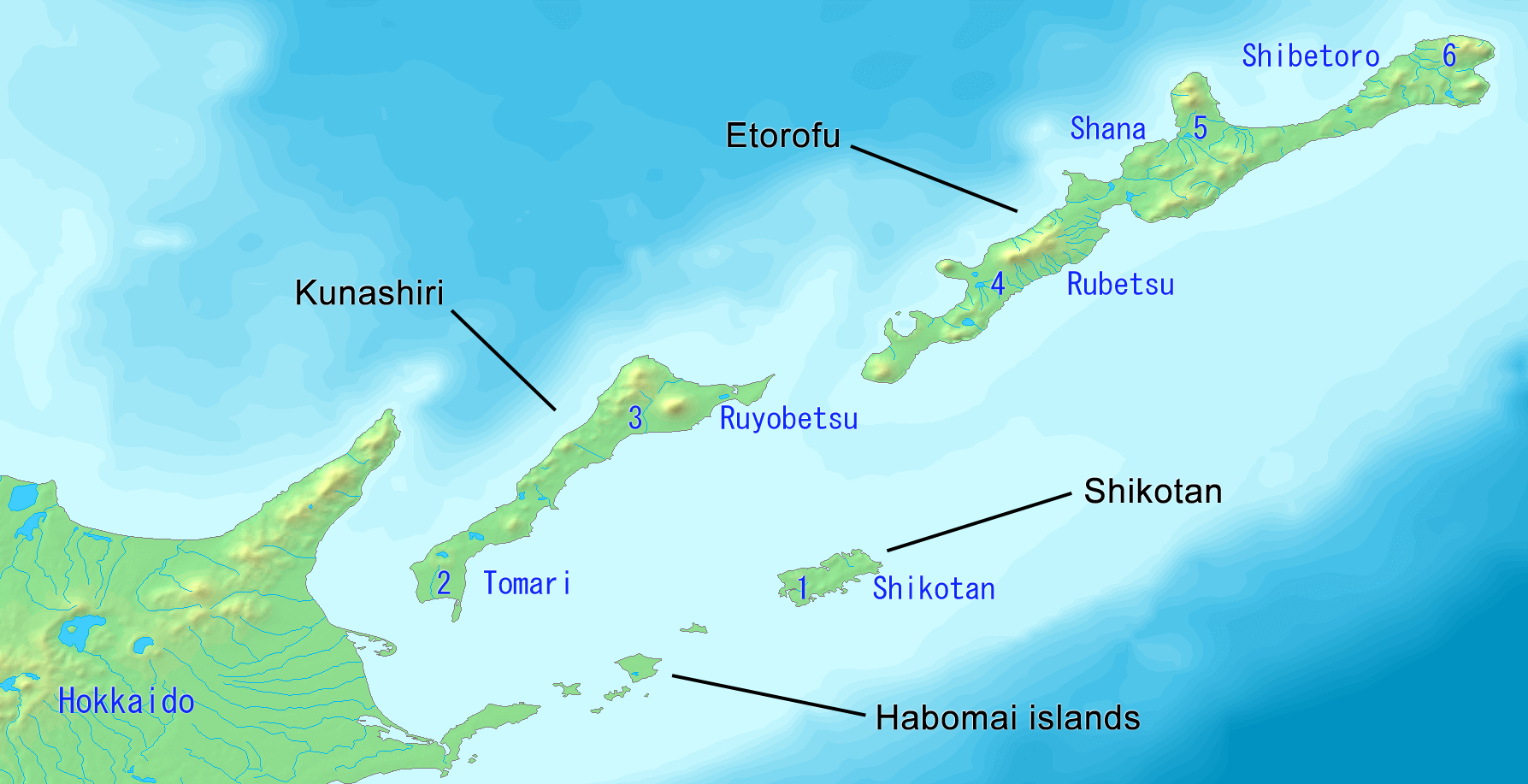
Nemuro Subprefecture is in north eastern Hokkaido. It shows the names of the claimed islands and districts (Northern Territories)

Also known as the Southern Kuril Islands (administered by Russia, claimed by Japan; see Kuril Islands dispute):

Name		Type	Area (km^{2})	Population	District	Island	Map
Rōmaji	Kanji	Type	Area (km^{2})	Population	District	Island	Map
Rubetsu (Pioner)	留別村	Village	1,442.82	2,814	Etorofu District	Iturup	
Ruyobetsu	留夜別村	Village	960.27	3,401	Kunashiri District	Kunashir	
Shana (Kurilsk)	紗那村	Village	973.3	1,426	Shana District	Iturup	
Shibetoro (Rudnaya)	蘂取村	Village	760.5	881	Shibetoro District	Iturup	
Shikotan	色丹村	Village	253.33	1,499	Shikotan District	Shikotan	
Tomari (Golovnino)	泊村	Village	538.56	5,595	Kunashiri District	Kunashir	

=== Districts renounced in the San Francisco Treaty ===
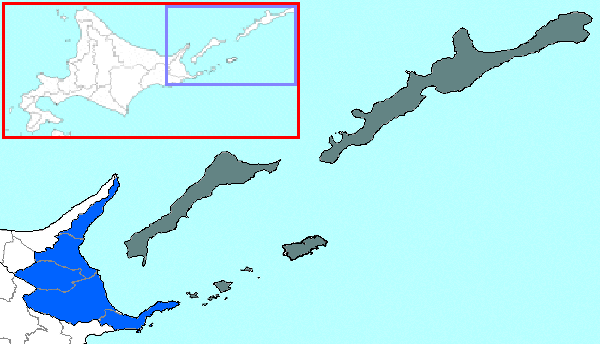
Nemuro Subprefecture is blue. The claimed islands and districts (Northern Territories) are grey.

- Uruppu (Urup)
- Shimushiru (Simushir)
- Shumushu (Shumshu)

=== Islands ===
- Habomai Rocks
- Shikotan Island
- Kunashiri
- Etorofu (Iturup)
