= Nemuro Nakashibetsu Airport =

Airport in Nakashibetsu, Hokkaido, Japan

Nemuro Nakashibetsu Airport 根室中標津空港
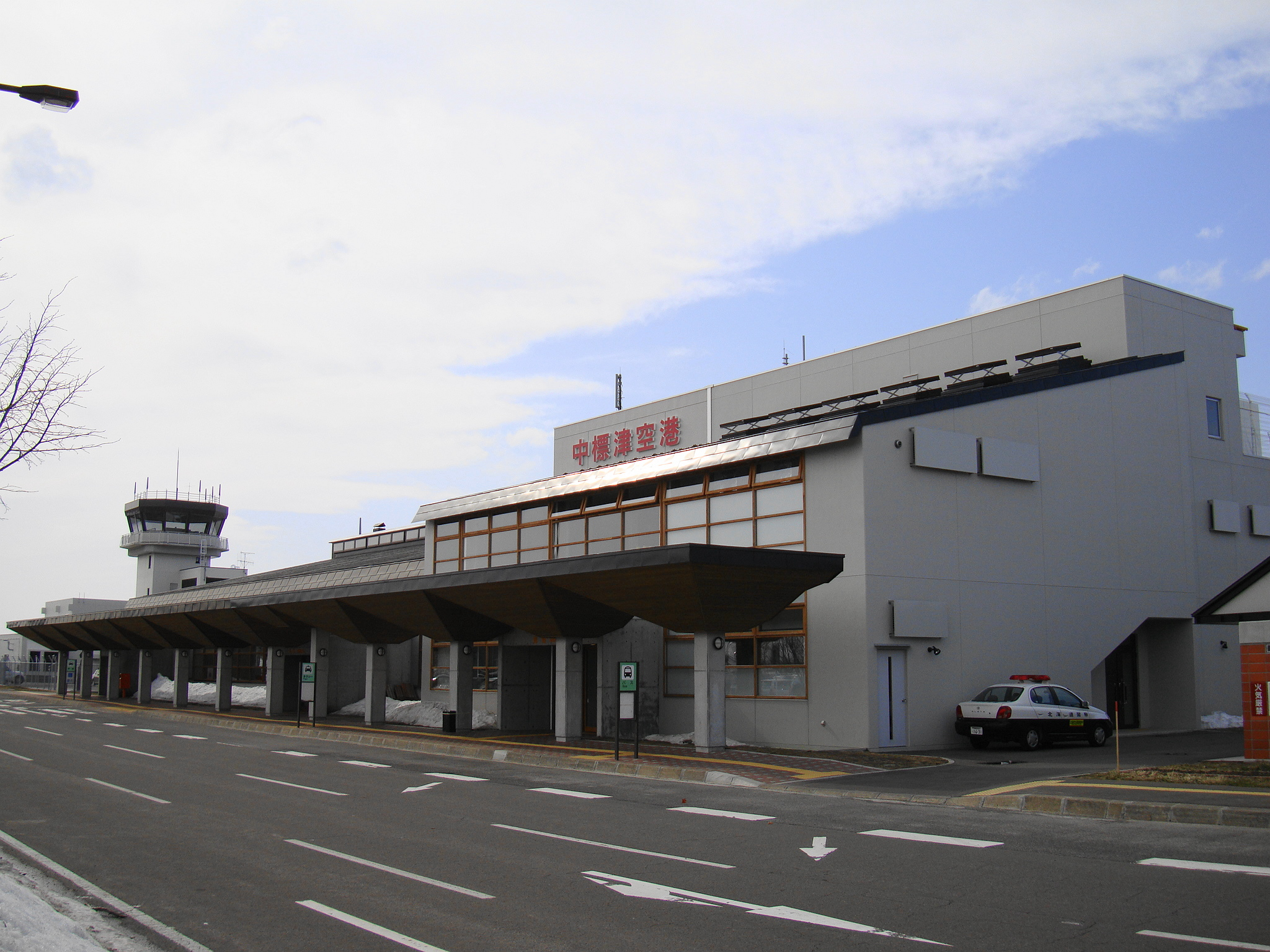
- IATA: SHB; ICAO: RJCN

Summary
- Airport type: Public
- Serves: Nakashibetsu, Nemuro
- Location: Nakashibetsu, Hokkaido, Japan
- Elevation AMSL: 214 ft (65 m)
- Coordinates: 43°34′39″N 144°57′36″E
- Website: www.nakashibetsu-airport.jp

Map
- Location in Japan RJCN (Japan)

Runways
Direction	Length		Surface
Direction	m	ft	Surface
08/26	2,000	6,562	Asphalt concrete

Statistics (2015)
- Passengers: 197,245
- Cargo (metric tonnes): 435
- Aircraft movement: 3,134
- Source: Japanese Ministry of Land, Infrastructure, Transport and Tourism

Nemuro Nakashibetsu Airport (根室中標津空港, Nemuro Nakashibetsu Kūkō) (IATA: SHB, ICAO: RJCN) is an airport located 2 NM (3.7 km; 2.3 mi) from Nakashibetsu, Hokkaido, Japan. It serves Nakashibetsu and the nearby city of Nemuro, and is the easternmost airport in the country.

The Japanese government officially refers to the airport as Nakashibetsu Airport, while the airport operator uses the Nemuro Nakashibetsu name, as does the only airline group serving the airport (All Nippon Airways).

== History ==
Nakashibetsu Airport was constructed as an Imperial Japanese Navy airfield in 1944. It opened for civilian use following the war in 1965, and scheduled service to Okadama Airport in Sapporo began in 1974, followed by service to New Chitose Airport in 1980 and Tokyo Haneda Airport in 1990. Chitose flights were suspended in 2008 but resumed following the termination of Okadama service in 2010.

The airport was substantially renovated and the runway extended in 1990, coinciding with the closure of the nearby JNR Shibetsu Line in 1989.

In 2011, the Hokkaido government announced that landing fees would be waived for international charter flights using the airport in an attempt to lure more overseas tourists to the region.

The airport has been used for charter flights to the nearby Kuril Islands, which are administered by Russia but were formerly part of (and are still claimed by) Japan, to bring former residents of the islands to visit the graves of relatives. Aurora operated a Dash 8 charter flight from Nakashibetsu to Iturup and Kunashir in August 2019. In October 2020, amid international travel restrictions during the COVID-19 pandemic, the Japanese government arranged five sightseeing flights from Nakashibetsu to carry former residents over the islands without landing.

== Airlines and destinations ==
Airlines	Destinations
All Nippon Airways	Tokyo–Haneda
ANA Wings	Sapporo–Chitose
Hokkaido Air System	Sapporo–Okadama

== Facilities ==
The passenger terminal building is constructed of wood, and is claimed to be the first wooden airport terminal in Japan. The terminal contains a restaurant, two shops, and a rooftop observation deck with views of the nearby Shiretoko Peninsula.
