= Notsuke =

Notsuke may refer to:

- Notsuke Peninsula
- Notsuke Bay
- Notsuke District, Hokkaido
