= Notsuke Bay =

Bay in Hokkaido, Japan

Notsuke Bay 野付湾
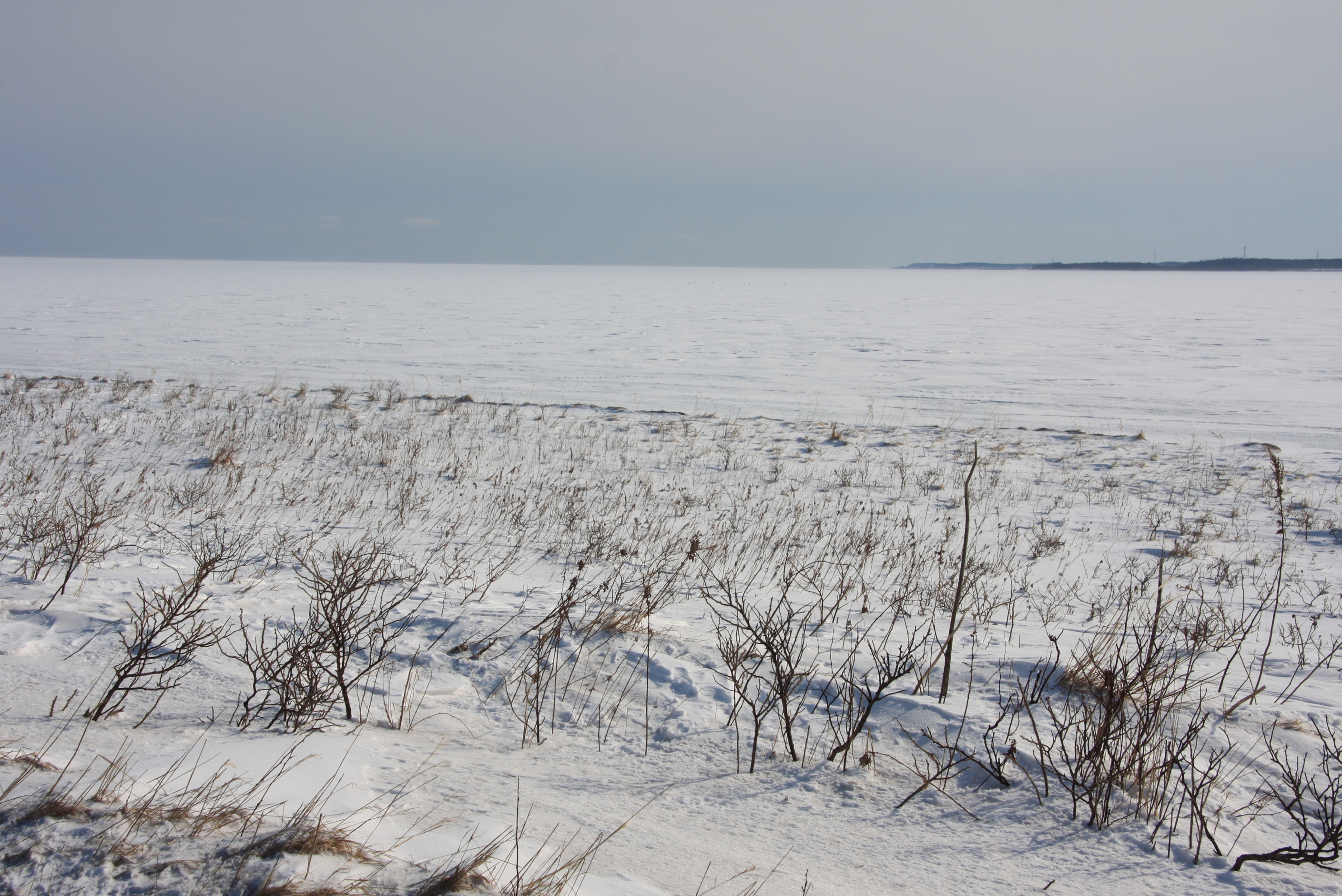

- Location within Hokkaido
- Coordinates: 43°35′38″N 145°12′24″E
- River sources: Togawa (戸川)
- Ocean/sea sources: Sea of Okhotsk
- Basin countries: Japan
- Surface area: 5,700 hectares (14,000 acres)
- Max. depth: 4.3 m (14 ft)
- Settlements: Betsukai

Ramsar Wetland
- Official name: Notsuke-hanto and Notsuke-wan
- Designated: 8 November 2005
- Reference no.: 1552

Notsuke Bay (野付湾, Notsuke-wan) is a shallow bay in eastern Hokkaido, Japan, separated from Nemuro Bay and the Sea of Okhotsk by the curving Notsuke Peninsula. The bay mouth has a width of some 4.3 kilometres (2.7 mi) and a maximum depth of 4 metres (13 ft); most of the area of the bay has a depth of less than 1 metre (3 ft 3 in), making it unsuitable for the use of boats with engines. One of the largest seagrass beds in the country, the expanse of eelgrass and kelp makes it an important habitat for marine life, notably Hokkai shrimp (ホッカイエビ) (Pandalus latirostris), which are harvested in the summer and autumn by utase-bune (打瀬船), with their three-cornered sails. Together with Notsuke Peninsula, by which it is largely enclosed, Notsuke Bay has been designated a Ramsar Site, as a wetland of international importance, a Special Wildlife Protection Area, and an Important Bird Area, and forms part of Notsuke-Fūren Prefectural Natural Park. Water fowl include the grey-tailed tattler, redshank, whooper swan, brent goose, wigeon, scaup, and common goldeneye.

== See also ==
- List of Ramsar sites in Japan
- Nemuro Strait
- Kunashir Island
- Ishikari Bay
