= Mine-Akiyoshidai Karst Plateau Geopark =

Geopark in Mine, Yamaguchi, Japan

Miné-Akiyoshidai Karst Plateau Geopark
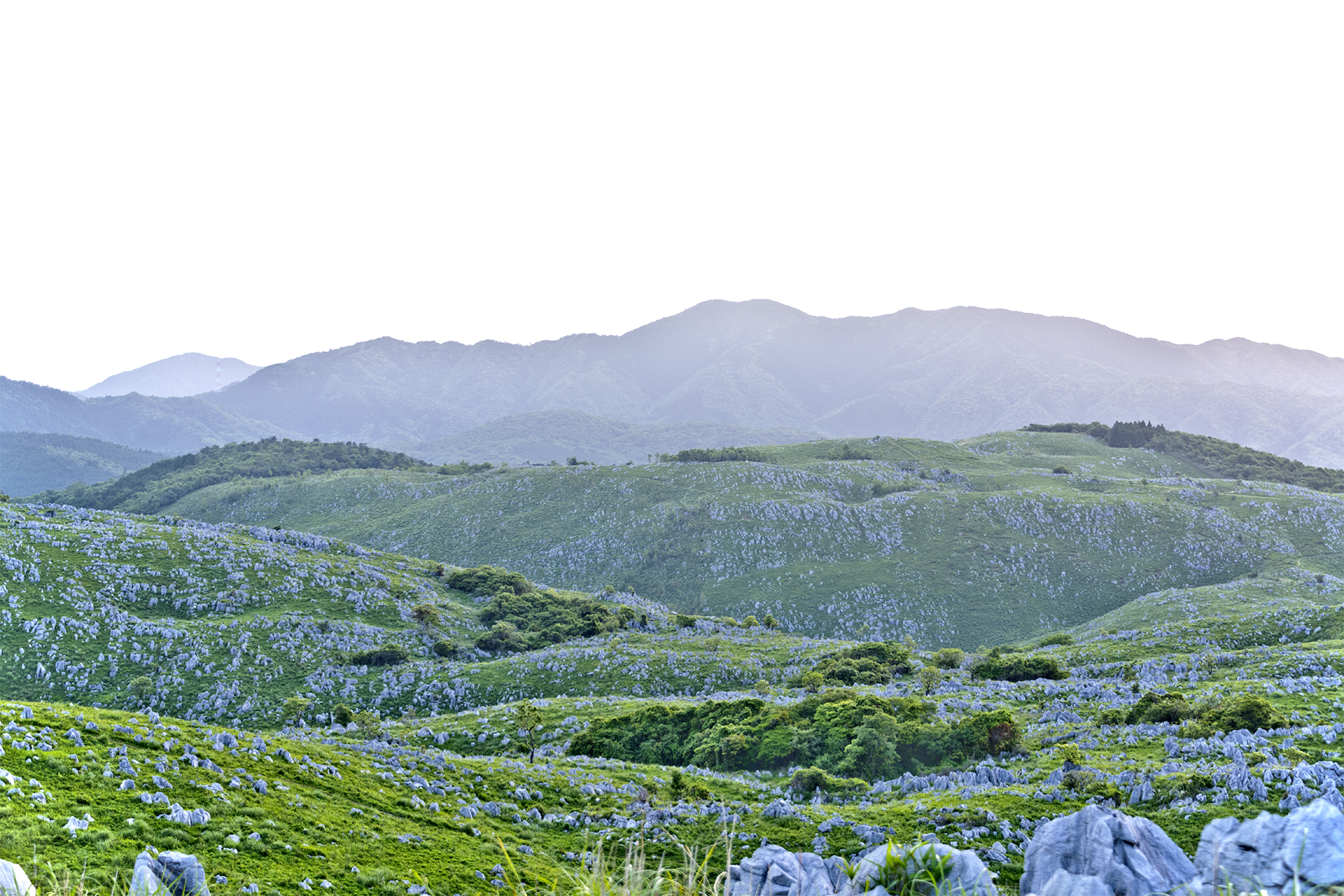
- View of Akiyoshidai
- Type: Japanese Geopark
- Location: Mine, Yamaguchi, Japan
- Website: http://en.mine-geo.com/

Mine-Akiyoshidai Karst Plateau Geopark (Japanese: Mine秋吉台ジオパーク) is a geopark that covers the entire area of Mine City in Yamaguchi Prefecture, southern Japan. It was certified as a Japanese geopark in 2015 and is a UNESCO Global Geopark. Akiyoshidai Quasi-National Park is situated within the geopark. Mine-Akiyoshidai Karst Plateau Geopark is a member of the Japanese Geoparks Network, and works with both the Global Geoparks Network and the Asia Pacific Geoparks Network.

== Theme ==
The theme of Mine-Akiyoshidai Karst Plateau Geopark is ”The history of the Earth and its life is still alive in the karst plateau; draw close to the Earth, and support one another".

== Geology ==
Mine-Akiyoshidai Karst Plateau Geopark uses the white/black/red system to describe the area's geological features to its visitors.

White represents the limestone that makes up the Akiyoshidai karst plateau towards the north-east of the geopark. Karst formations can be seen in Akiyoshidai karst plateau, the largest karst plateau in Japan; these were once coral reefs that formed in the southern sea and were carried towards the continent on the oceanic plate 300 million years ago. The coral was added to the continental plate through accretion, where it became limestone over time. Underneath the karst plateau is Akiyoshidō Cave, one of the largest limestone caves in Japan that was formed as rainwater dissolved the limestone on the karst plateau and created an underground tunnel. This phenomenon created the karst landscape of Mine City.

Black represents coal. Anthracite, a rare type of coal in Japan which does not emit much smoke when burned, formed 200 million years ago in the Ōmine area towards the west of the geopark. Coal mining was a prominent industry at the Ōmine Coalfield, which was the largest producer of anthracite in Japan in the 1960s.

Red represents the copper of Naganobori Copper Mine in the Mitō area, towards the east of the geopark. The copper from this region was formed 100 million years ago when the limestone in the ground reacted with magma through volcanic activity. Excavations have revealed that Naganobori is the oldest copper mine in Japan and that the high-quality copper that was excavated in this area was used in the construction of the Great Buddha of Nara in 753.

== Karstar ==
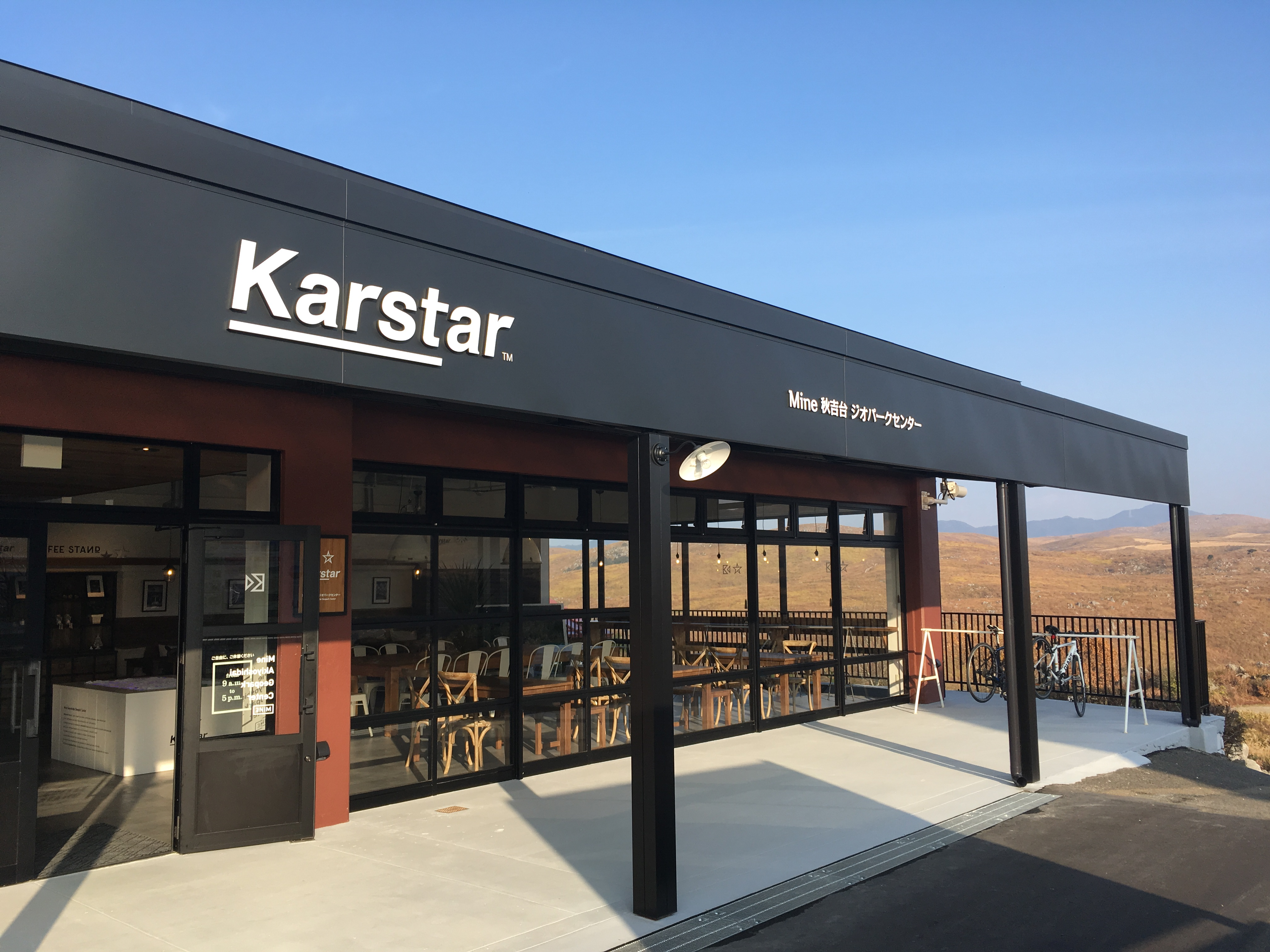
Karstar

Mine-Akiyoshidai Karst Plateau Geopark Center "Karstar" is a tourist information center situated in Akiyoshidai Karst Plateau. The Geopark Center features a café, a free resting area, free Wi-Fi and mobile phone chargers. Visitors can speak to certified "Geoguides" at Karstar who provide information about the geopark and the activities that are on offer. The "Geoguides" also offer geotours of the area.

== Sites ==
Mine-Akiyoshidai Karst Plateau Geopark features 27 geosites, 14 cultural sites and 3 natural sites.

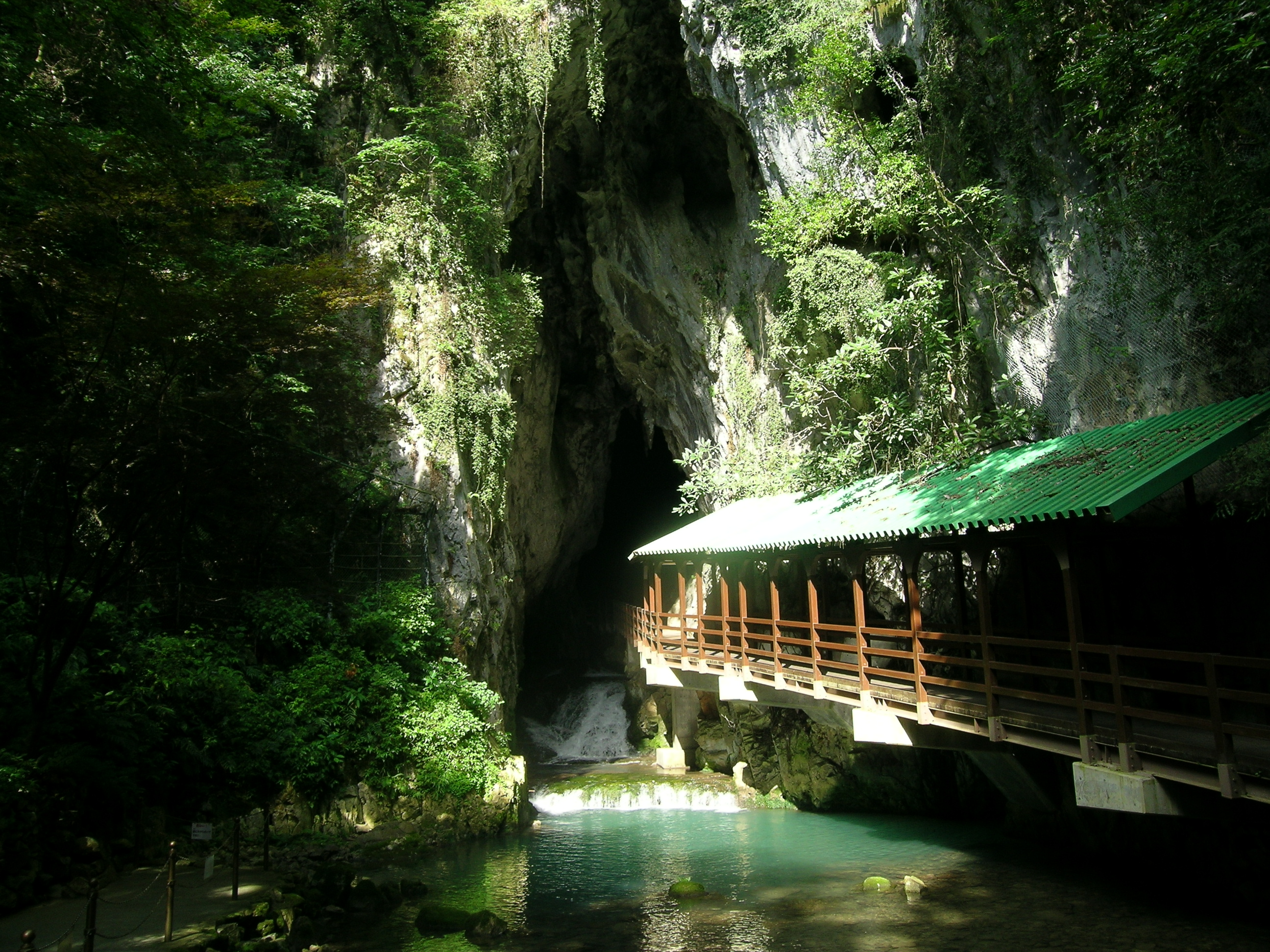
Entrance to Akiyoshidō Cave

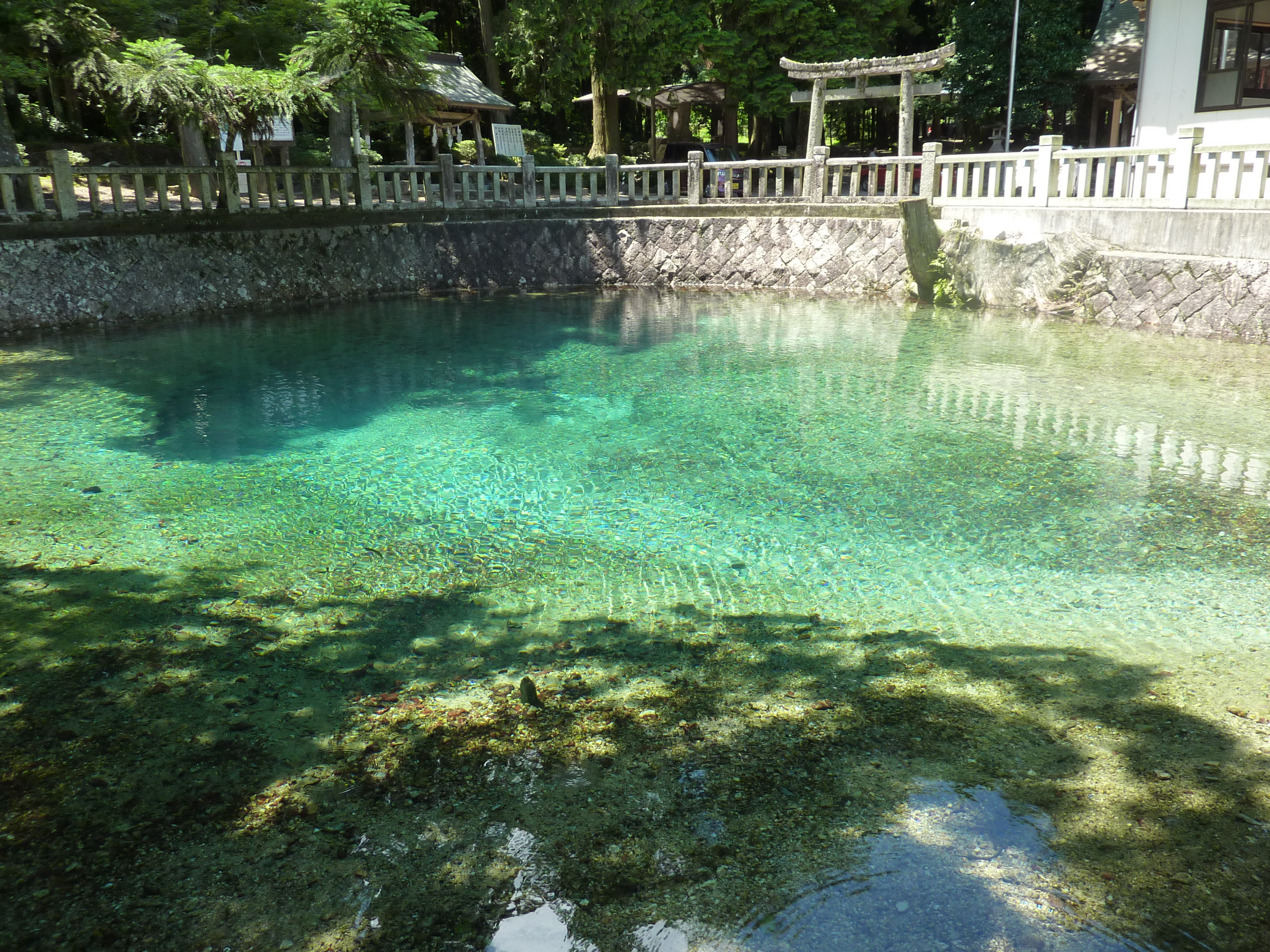
Beppu Benten Pond

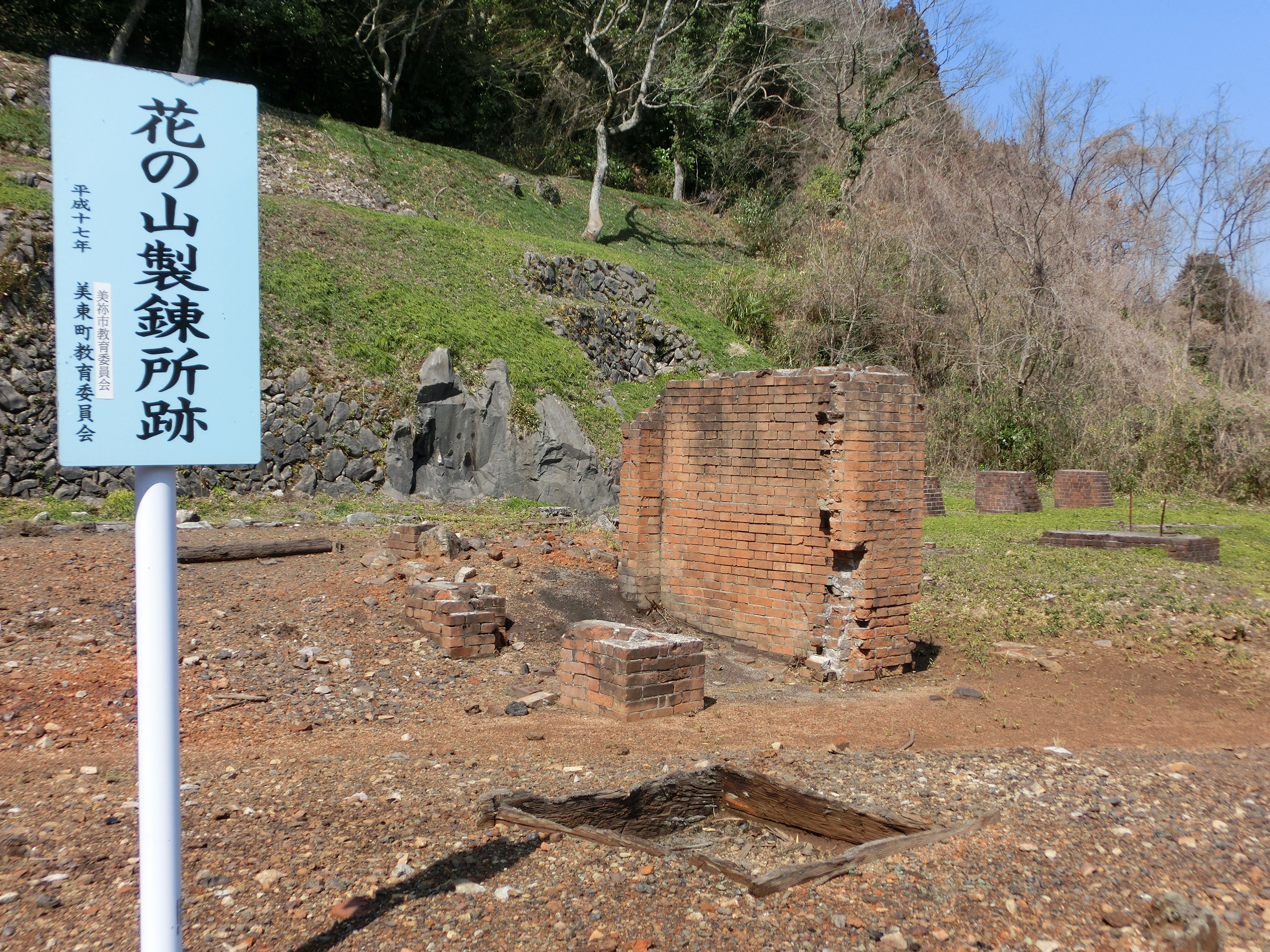
Naganobori Copper Mine Ruins

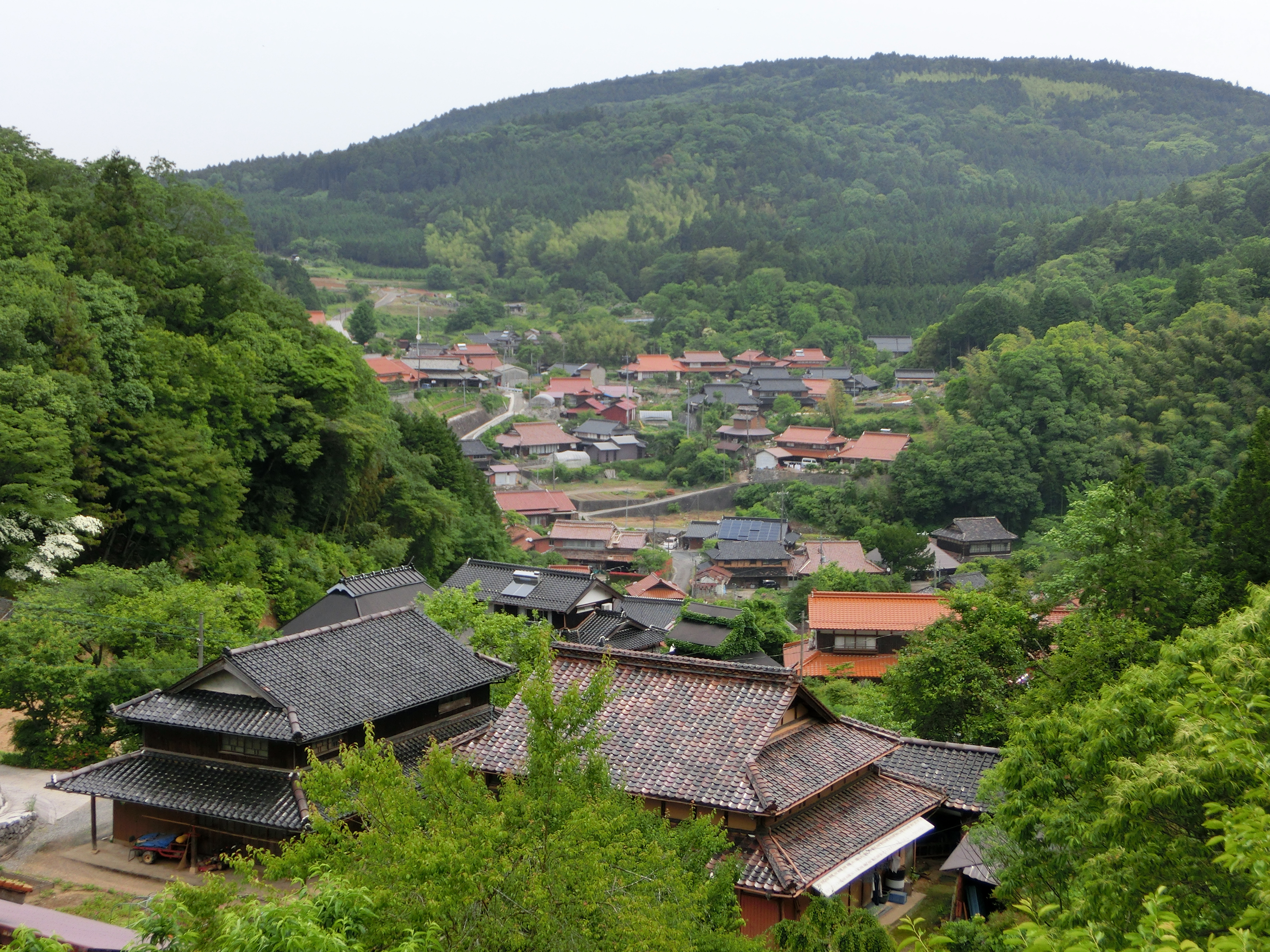
Yowara Uvala and Hamlet

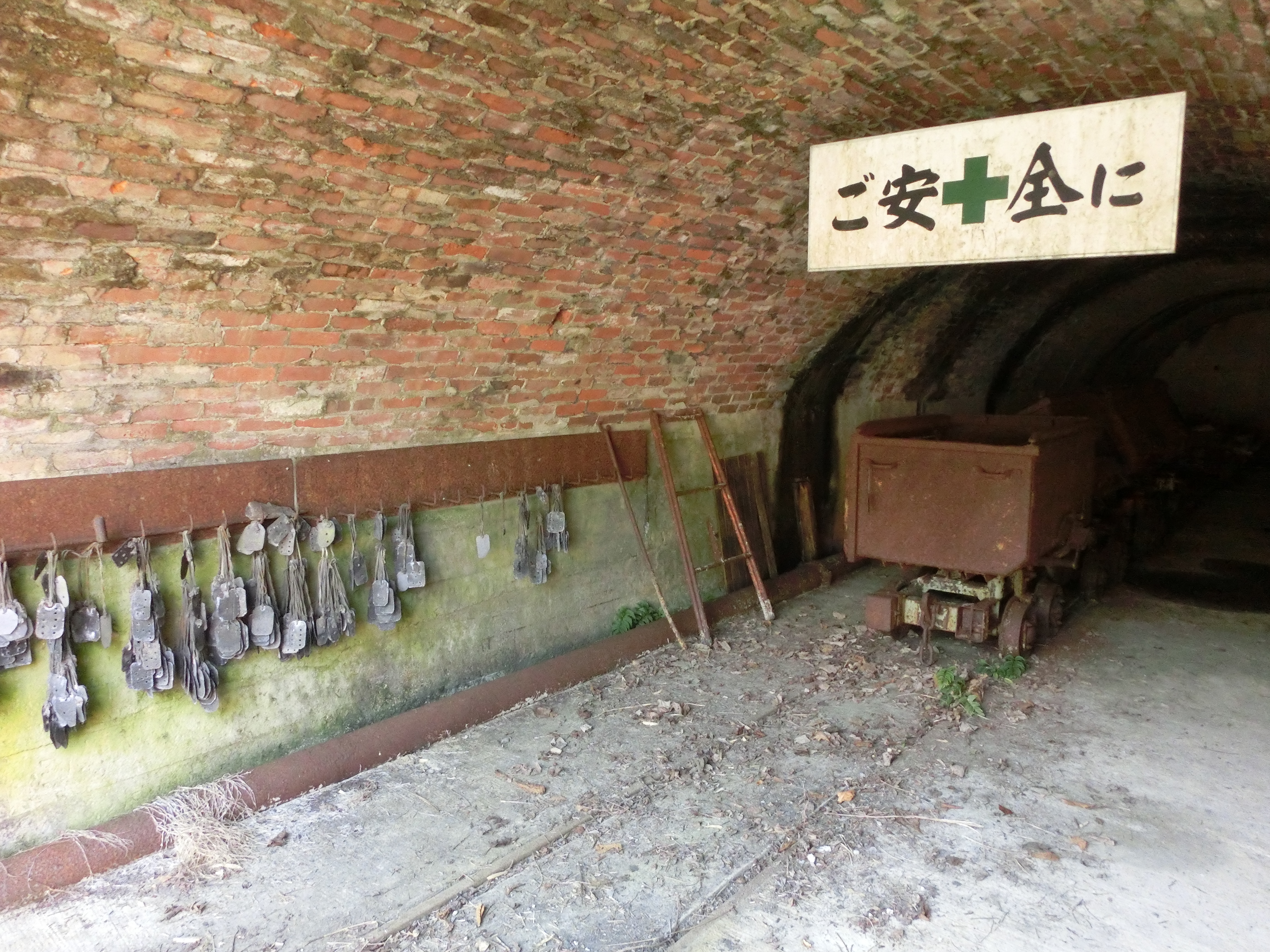
Arakawa Horizontal Mine Ruins

Geosites

- The granitoid gneiss (orthogneiss) of Hirano
- The serpentinite of Hirano
- The basalt of Miyanobaba
- Mt Kanmuri
- Mt Kita
- Kaerimizu
- Mt Ryūgohō
- Chōjanishiki Quarry Ruins
- The chert of Kamisobara
- The sandstone of Ayagi
- The limestone block-containing mudstone of Higashi-Shibukura
- The pebbly mudstone of Tsunemori
- Momonoki Strip Mine Ruins
- The fossiliferous siltstone of Okubata
- The granite of Ofuku
- Naganobori Skarn Deposit (Strip Mine Ruins)
- The Great Rocks of Magura
- Akiyoshidō Cave
- Kagekiyodō Hole (Kagekiyodō Cave)
- Taishodō Cave
- Nakaodō Cave
- Ofukudō Cave
- Suijin Pond (Blue Pond)
- The hole of Shiramizu Pond (Spring Water)
- Beppu Benten Pond
- Mitō Waterfall
- The outcrop of the fault of a tectonic line in Saigatao, Mana

Cultural sites

- Naganobori Copper Mine Ruins
- Suebara Kiln Ruins
- The Buddha in the wall of Mt Rakan, Ishiyakata
- Aokage Silver Mine Ruins
- Arakawa Horizontal Mine Ruins
- Mine Inclined Mineshaft Ruins (Mugigawa)
- The lime kiln ruins of Ofuku
- Chōjaga Forest
- Yowara Uvala and Hamlet
- The doline fields of Kaerimizu
- Kinrei Shrine
- Suijin Park (Guardian god for breast milk)
- The terraced paddy fields of Ōishi
- Kuzuga Hole

Natural sites

- Mt Katsuragi
- Mt Hanao
- Nitanda Reservoir (Water Iris Field)
