= Nemuro Bay =

Located in Japan

Coordinates: 43°21′40″N 145°27′13″E

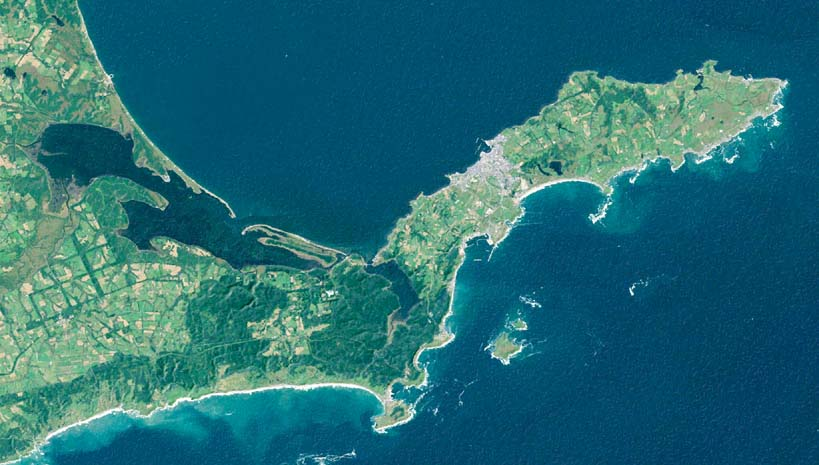
Landsat image

Nemuro Bay (根室湾, Nemuro-wan) is a body of water on the northern coast of the Nemuro Peninsula in Hokkaido, Japan.

== Overview ==
Nemuro Bay is a rich fishing ground near the Habomai Islands. It is closed on its northwest side by the Shiretoko Peninsula, Hokkaidō, Japan; to the north and northeast, across the Nemuro Strait it faces the Northern Territories (北方領土, Hoppō Ryōdo), -the parts of Kuril Islands claimed by Japan and occupied by Russia. It is overlooked by the Japanese towns of Rausu and Shibetsu.

On the coast of Hokkaido, the Notsuke Peninsula encloses Notsuke Bay, a distinct body of water which has been designated a Ramsar Site.

The main inflow rivers are the Harubetsu River and Tokotan River.

The main ports are Nemuro Port on the south side of Nemuro Bay, Tokotan Port, and Betsukai Port. It is located at a latitude of 43° north and is covered with drift ice in winter.
