= Nemuro =

Nemuro may refer to:

- Nemuro Subprefecture, Hokkaido Prefecture, Japan
  - Nemuro, Hokkaido, a city
  - Nemuro Peninsula
  - Nemuro Strait
  - Nemuro Bay
- Nemuro Province, an old province of Japan
