= Notsuke-Fūren Prefectural Natural Park =

Natural park in Hokkaido, Japan

Coordinates: 43°35′24″N 145°20′06″E

- 野付風蓮道立自然公園
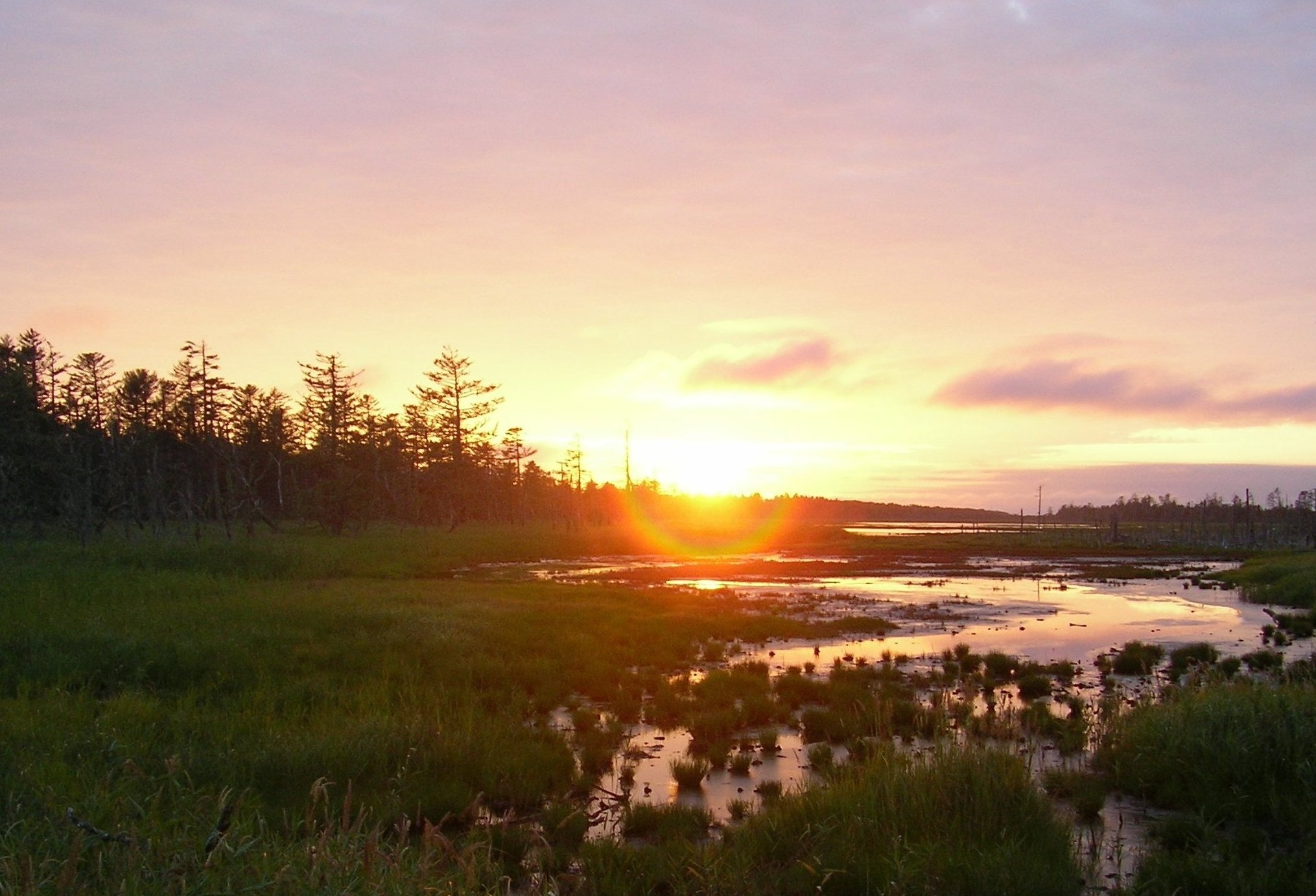
- Shunkunitai at the edge of Lake Furen
- Interactive map of Notsuke-Fūren Prefectural Natural Park
- Location: Hokkaidō, Japan
- Area: 116.92 km^{2} (45.14 sq mi)
- Established: 1962

Notsuke-Fūren Prefectural Natural Park (野付風蓮道立自然公園, Notsuke-Fūren dōritsu shizen kōen) is a Prefectural Natural Park in eastern Hokkaidō, Japan. Established in 1962, the park spans the municipalities of Betsukai, Nemuro, and Shibetsu. The park comprises two principal areas, the Notsuke peninsula (野付半島) and Lake Furen.

== See also ==
- National Parks of Japan
- Ramsar Sites in Japan
