= Miyajima-numa =

Miyajima-numa 宮島沼
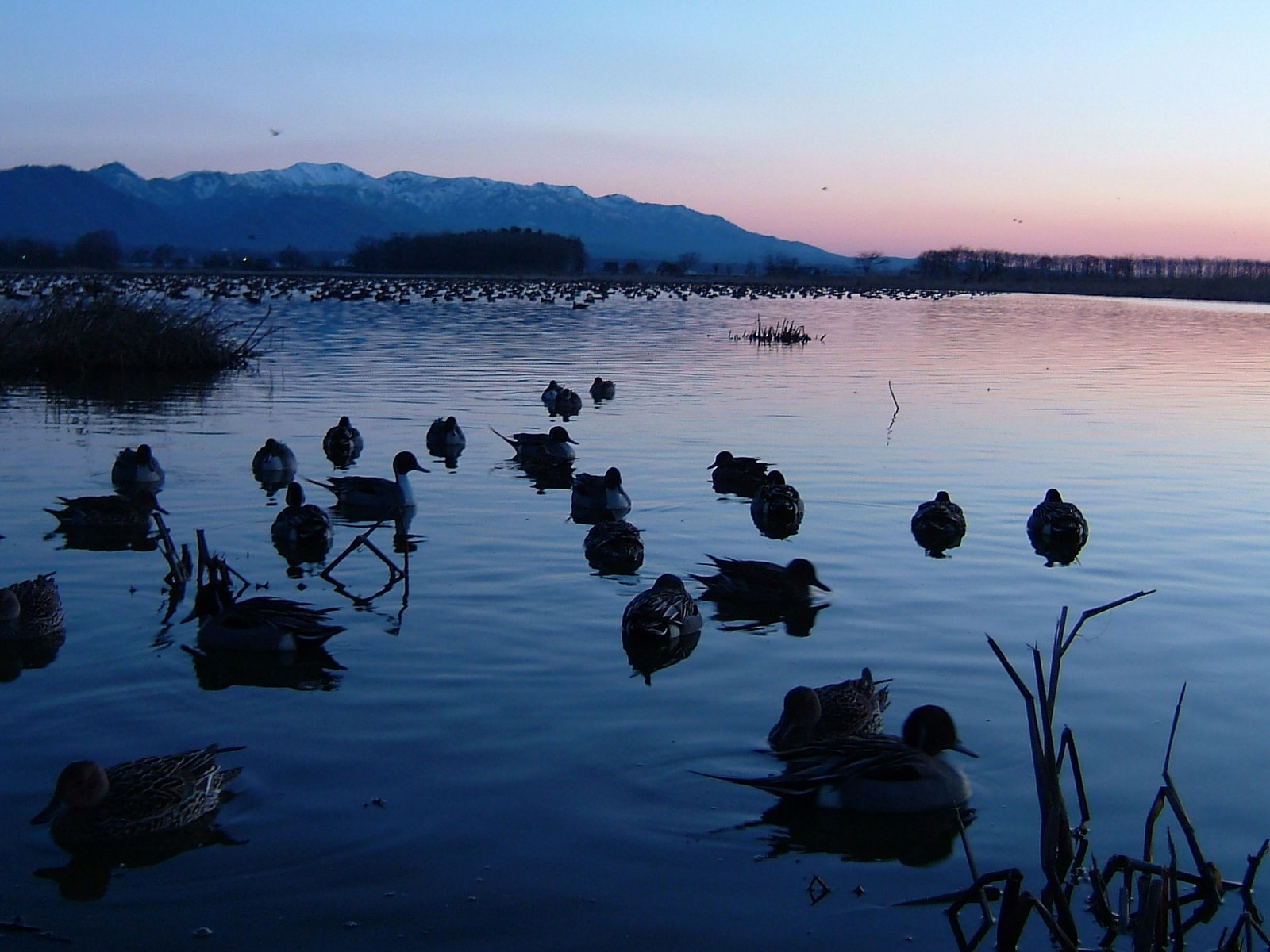

- Location within Japan
- Location: Bibai, Hokkaidō, Japan
- Coordinates: 43°19′58″N 141°42′48″E
- Type: Oxbow lake
- Surface area: 41 hectares (100 acres)
- Average depth: 1.7 metres (5 ft 7 in)
- Surface elevation: 13 metres (43 ft)

Miyajima-numa (宮島沼) is a near-circular shallow freshwater oxbow lake located some 45 kilometres (28 mi) northeast of Sapporo on the Japanese island of Hokkaidō. Situated in the Ishikari peatlands and formed by the meandering Ishikari River that flows a short distance to the west, with the Kabato Mountains rising behind, there is no river inflow; instead it is fed by rainwater and melting snow, while being drawn on for the irrigation of the surrounding rice fields, developed since the Taishō era. A major stopover for migrating Anatidae, in particular fifty to sixty thousand greater white-fronted geese (Anser albifrons, a national Natural Monument), it has been designated a Ramsar site, as a wetland of international significance, and a Special Wildlife Protection Area. Formerly known simply as "Big Marsh" (大沼, Ōnuma), in 1891 one Miyajima Sajirō (宮島佐次郎) from Niigata Prefecture settled on the banks of the Ishikari; six years later he sold 31 hectares (77 acres) of land to the south of the lake, and six households settled in the cleared area. Mr Miyajima's principal crops at this time were soya beans, adzuki beans, and oats, but after major flooding of the Ishikari in 1904, he sold the remainder of his holdings, leaving but his name.

== See also ==
- List of Ramsar sites in Japan
- Hokkaidō Development Commission
- Hokkaidō Heritage
