= Kusagaki islets =

Japanese islets

Coordinates: 30°51′00″N 129°28′00″E

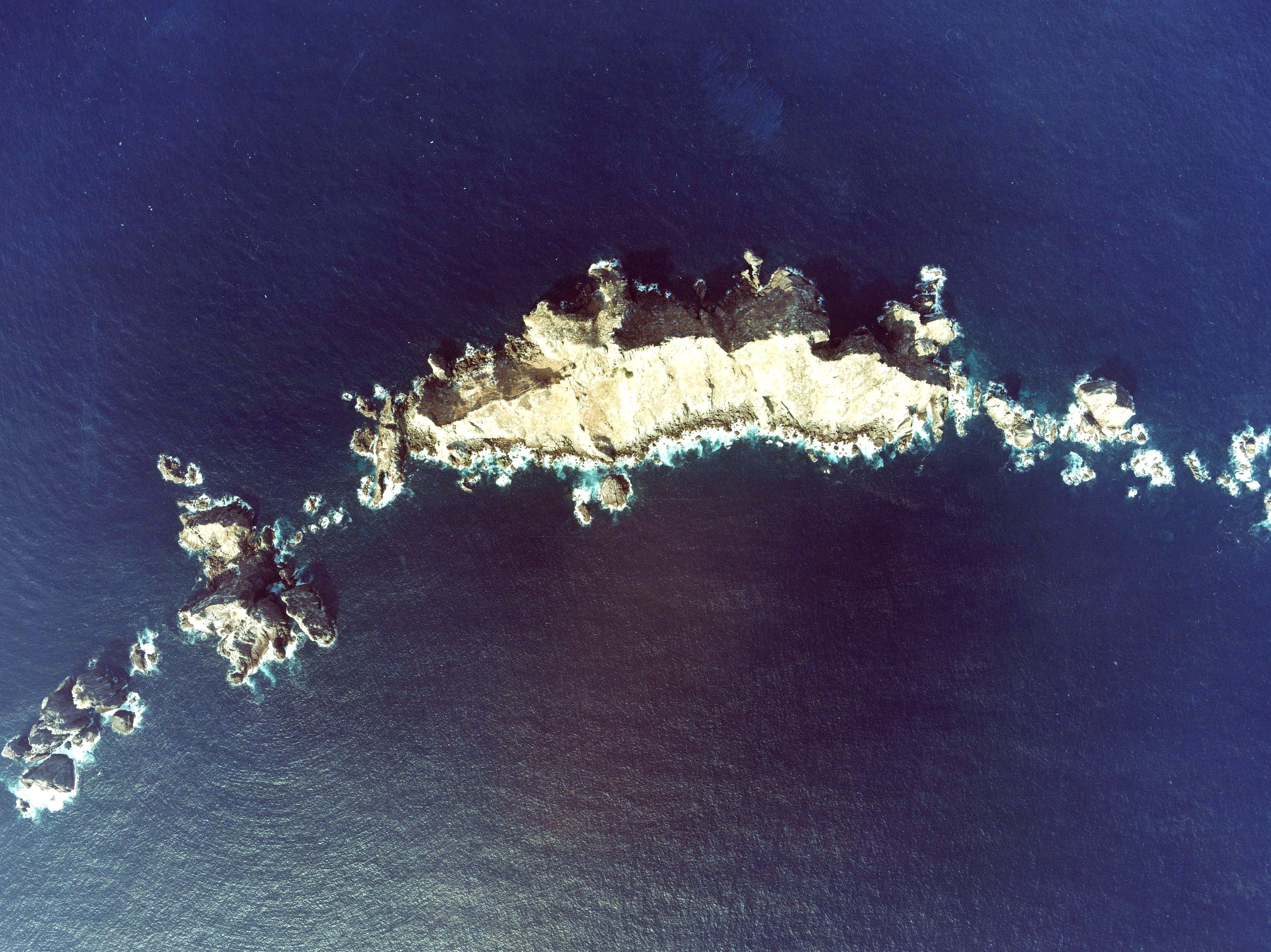
Aerial view of the islets

The Kusagaki islets are a group of small islands with a collective land area of about 50 ha. They lie in the Ōsumi group of the Satsunan Islands in the northern Nansei or Ryukyu archipelago of Japan. They have been recognised as an Important Bird Area (IBA) by BirdLife International because they support seabird colonies, containing a minimum of 10,000 pairs of streaked shearwaters.
