= Hideshima islet =

Japanese islet

Coordinates: 39°40′00″N 141°58′59″E

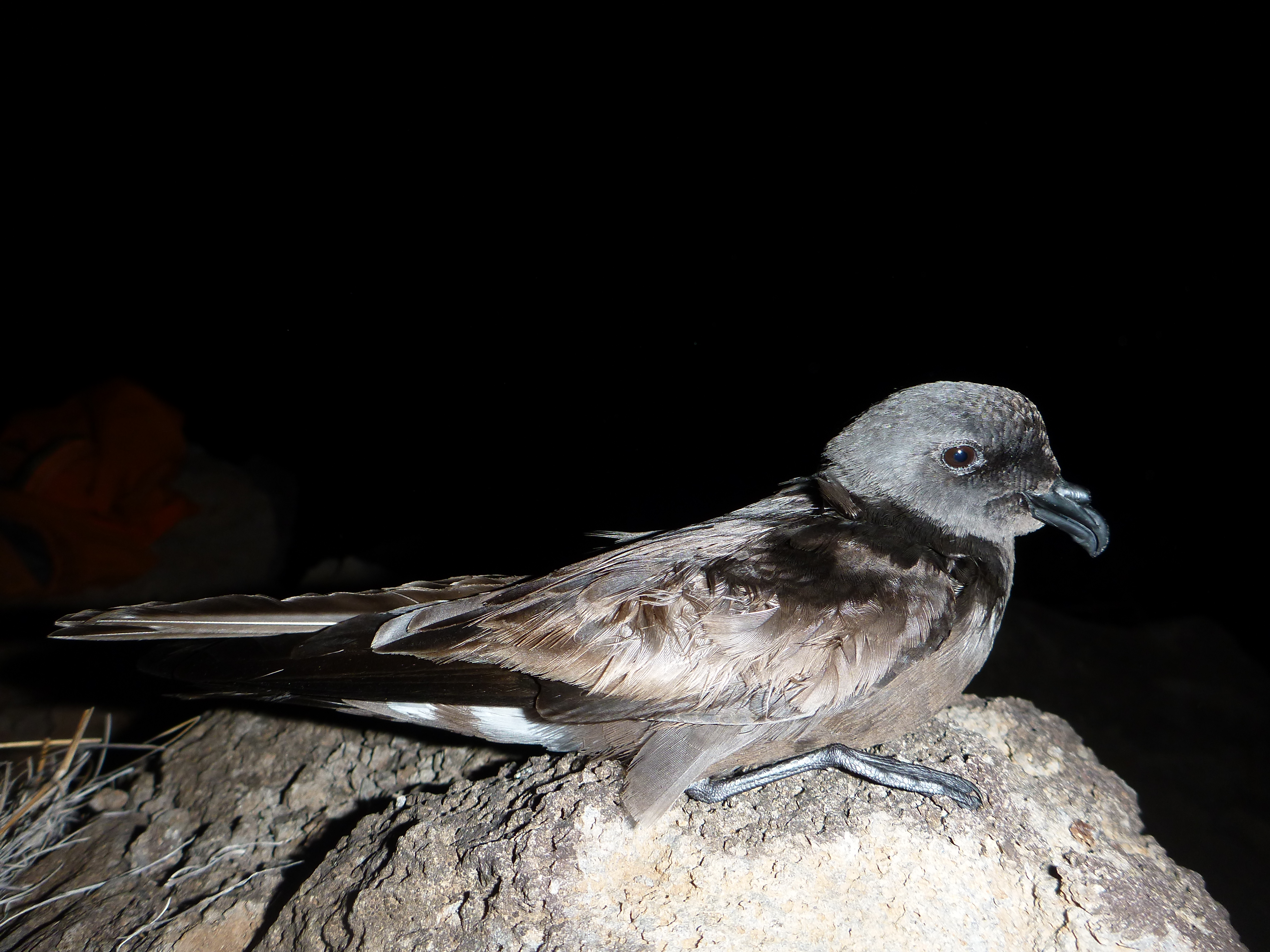
Band-rumped storm petrels breed on the islet

Hideshima islet is a small 8 ha island lying about 1 km off the coast of the Hinodejima fishery harbour of Miyako, Iwate Prefecture, Japan. It consists of a forested plateau surrounded by cliffs, the steep slopes used by burrow-nesting seabirds. The plateau forest is largely of Quercus crispula and Tilia japonica trees, with some Pinus densiflora and Cryptomeria japonica. The island lies within the Sanriku Fukkō National Park and has been recognised as an Important Bird Area (IBA) by BirdLife International because it supports a colony of band-rumped storm petrels. Streaked shearwaters also breed on the island.
