= Izunuma-Uchinuma =

Izunuma-Uchinuma 伊豆沼・内沼
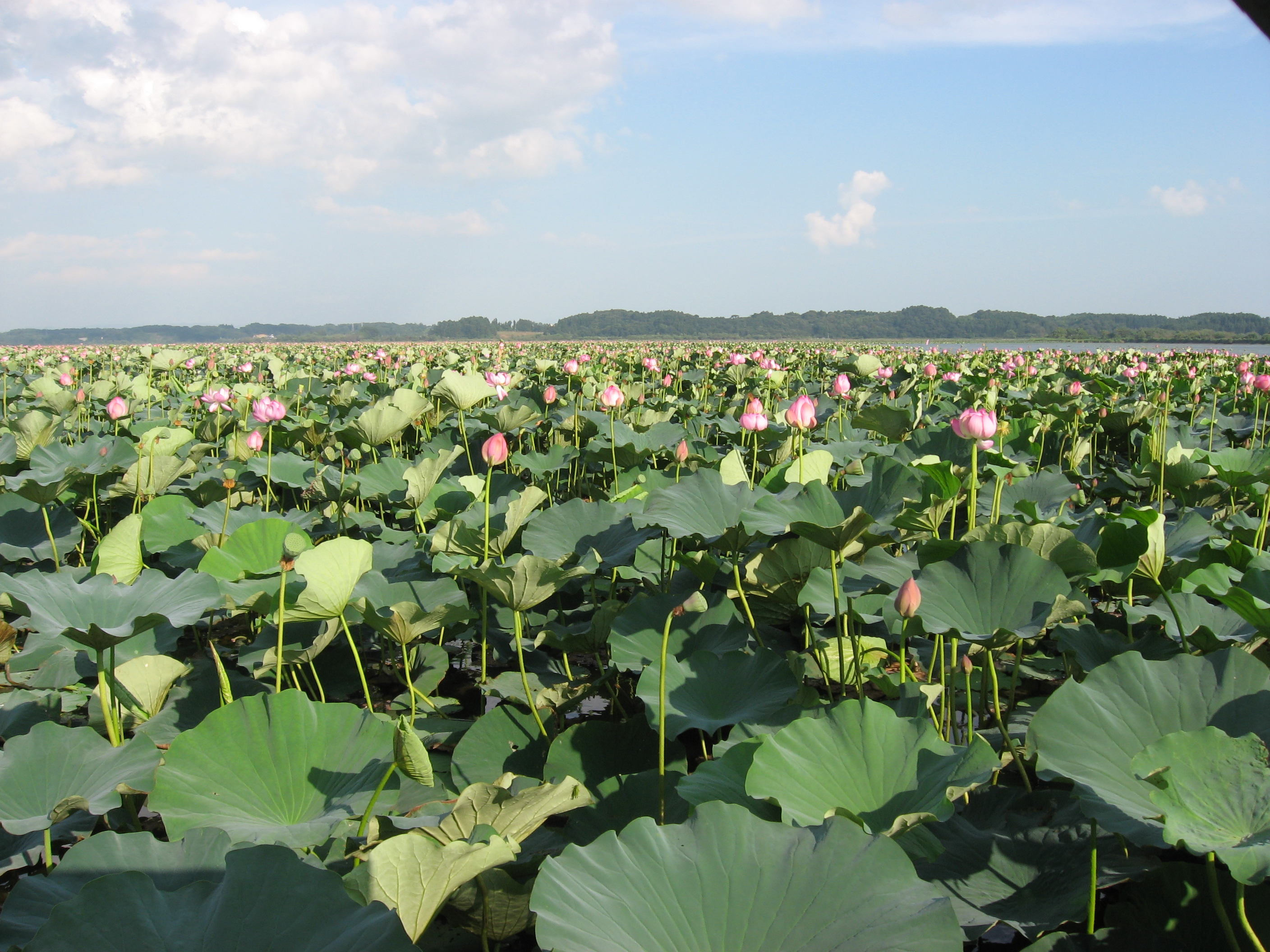
- Flowering lotus in Izunuma

- Location within Japan
- Location: Miyagi Prefecture, Japan
- Coordinates: 38°43′N 141°06′E
- Type: Freshwater lake
- Part of: Hasama River, tributary of Kitakami River
- Basin countries: Japan
- Surface area: 5.59 km^{2} (2.16 sq mi)
- Max. depth: 1.6 m (5.2 ft)
- Surface elevation: 7 m (23 ft)

Designations

Ramsar Wetland
- Official name: Izu-numa and Uchi-numa
- Designated: 13 September 1985
- Reference no.: 318

Izunuma and Uchinuma (伊豆沼・内沼) are a pair of interconnected freshwater lakes in the alluvial plain of the Hasama River, a tributary of the Kitakami River in Miyagi Prefecture, Japan. In 1967 the birdlife and habitat of the lakes were designated a Natural Monument. In 1985 an area of 559 hectares was designated a Ramsar Site. In 1996 the sound of the Izunuma-Uchinuma greater white-fronted goose was selected as one of the 100 Soundscapes of Japan by the Ministry of the Environment.

== See also ==
- Ramsar Sites in Japan
- 100 Soundscapes of Japan
- List of Special Places of Scenic Beauty, Special Historic Sites and Special Natural Monuments
