= Kenebetsu Air Base =

Kenebetsu Air Base (計根別飛行場, kenebetsuhikoujyou)

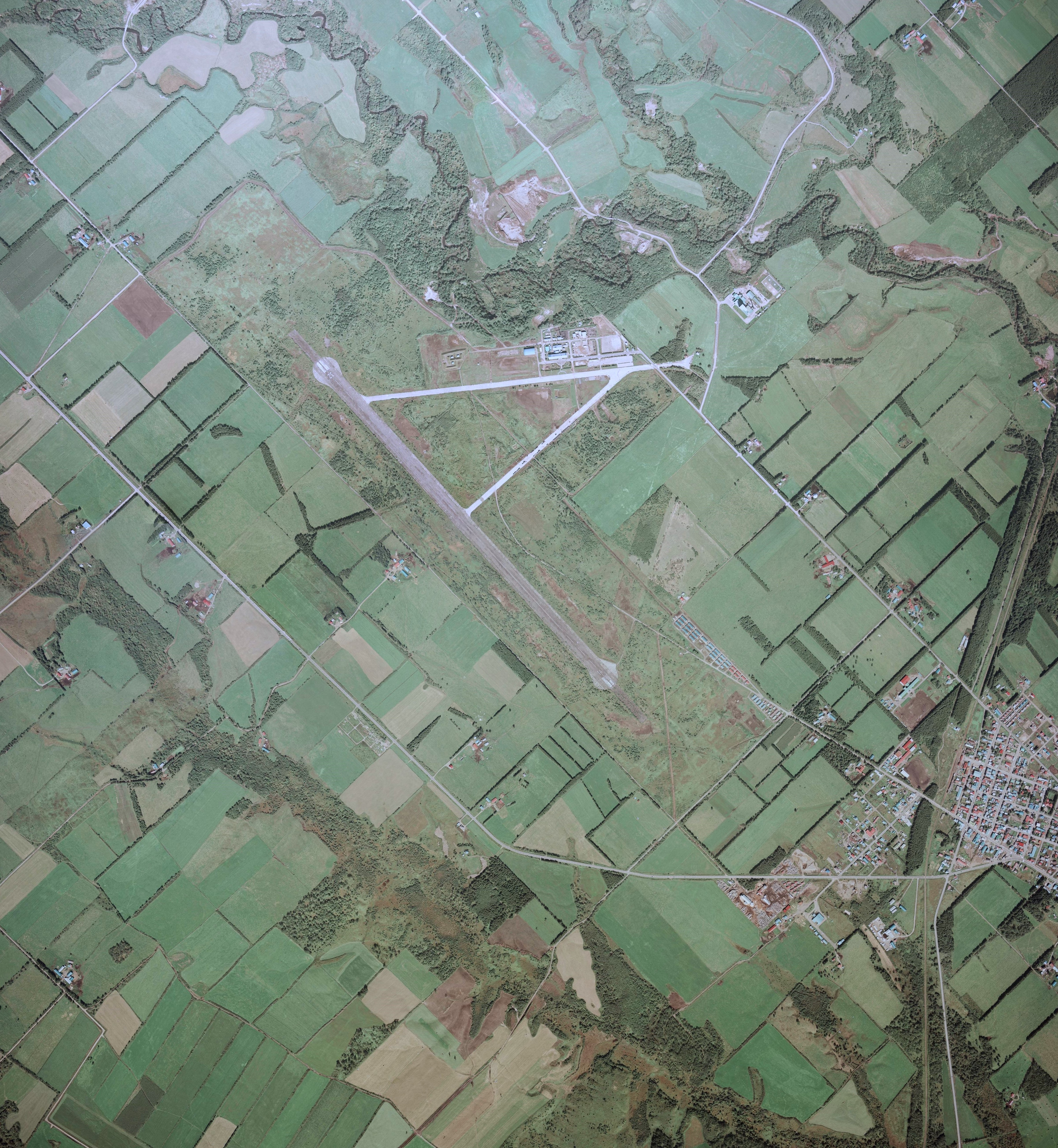
Kenebetsu Air Base Aerial Photograph 1977

is an air base located in Betsukai, Notsuke District, Hokkaido Prefecture, Japan.[1][2][3]
