= Lake Furen =

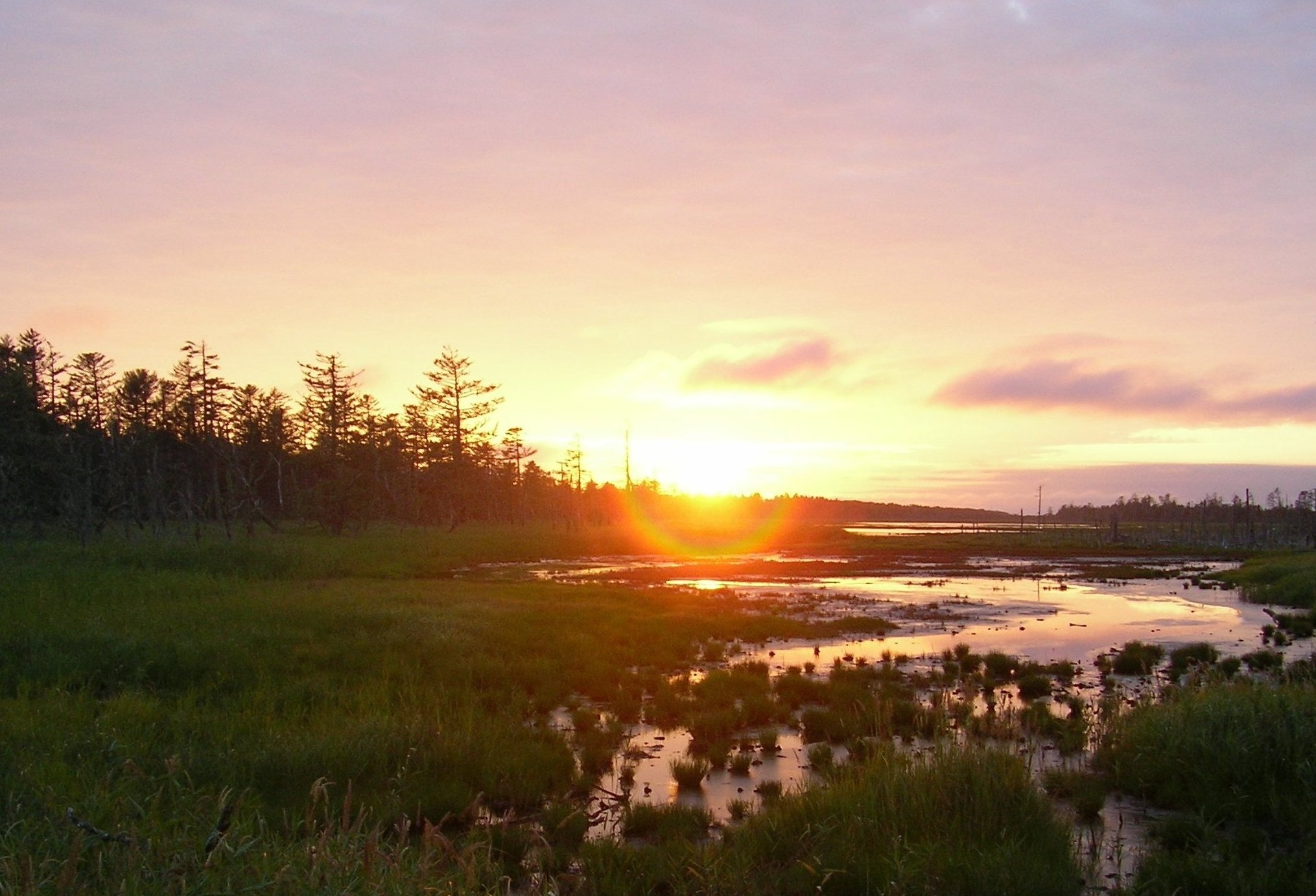
- Lake Furen

- Location within Japan
- Location: Hokkaidō, Japan
- Coordinates: 43°18′N 145°21′E
- Type: brackish lake

Designations

Ramsar Wetland
- Official name: Furen-ko and Shunkuni-tai
- Designated: 8 November 2005
- Reference no.: 1542

Fūren-ko (風蓮湖) is a brackish lake near Nemuro in Hokkaidō, Japan. The wetlands of Lake Furen and the shunkuni-tai (春国岱) dunes have been designated a Ramsar Site.

== See also ==
- Ramsar Sites in Japan
