= Akiyoshidai Quasi-National Park =

Quasi-national park in Yamaguchi prefecture, Japan

- 秋吉台国定公園
- IUCN category V (protected landscape/seascape)
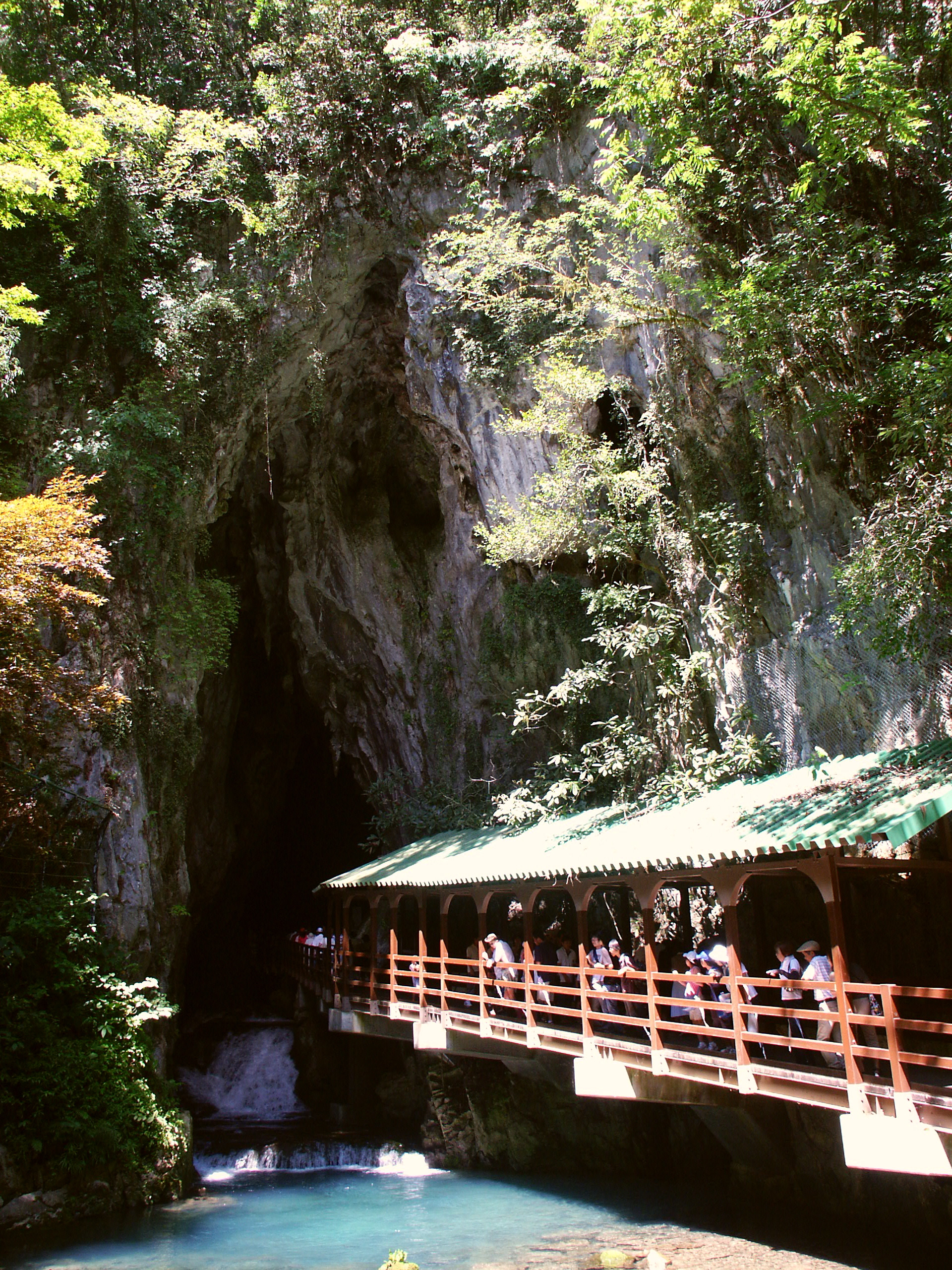
- Akiyoshidō cave

- Location within Yamaguchi Prefecture Location within Japan
- Location: Yamaguchi Prefecture, Japan
- Nearest city: Mine
- Coordinates: 34°13′55″N 131°18′10″E
- Area: 45.02 km^{2} (17.38 sq mi)
- Established: November 1, 1955
- Governing body: Yamaguchi Prefecture, Japan

Akiyoshidai Kokutei Kōen (秋吉台国定公園) is a Quasi-National Park in Yamaguchi Prefecture, Japan. It was founded on 1 November 1955 and has an area of 45.02 km².

It includes part of the Akiyoshi plateau (秋吉台, Akiyoshidai), a 130 square kilometre area of karst topography, as well as over 400 limestone caves. The area is rated a protected landscape (category V) according to the IUCN. Like all Quasi-National Parks in Japan, the park is managed by the local prefectural government.

The Akiyoshidai Groundwater System is a Ramsar Site and wetland of international importance.

== Facilities ==
Akiyoshidai Quasi-National Park is served by a natural history museum, visitor centre, rest house, youth hostel and park headquarters building, and is traversed by a scenic roadway and several walking trails. Events include a fireworks festival in July, a "Karst Walk" in November, and an annual burning off of dry grasses in February called "Yamayaki".

== Geology ==
The plateau consists of uplifted reef limestones of Paleozoic age, which were thickened by overfolding during the Akiyoshidai orogenic movement. Subsequent erosion has created an undulating karst landscape dimpled with many dolines and countless limestone pinnacles up to two meters in height. Beneath the surface lie hundreds of caves, a few of them quite significant geologically. Numerous fossils of Pleistocene age have been found in these caves, including those of the Japanese rhinoceros, Stegodont elephant, Naumann elephant, Young tiger, and many other animals from the last interglacial period.

The area around Akiyoshidai was heavily forested about 500,000 years ago. In the Jōmon period, with the general area serving as a hunting ground and the bottoms of sinkholes as vegetable fields. Numerous Paleolithic artifacts have been recovered. As farming started in Japan the local people eventually entirely replaced the forested landscape with Japanese pampas grass for feeding their animals and thatching houses. Repeated cycles of burning the grass have kept trees from growing back since.

== Akiyoshidō ==
Towards the southern end of Akiyoshidai is the Akiyoshidō cave, named by emperor Hirohito on May 30, 1926, when he was still crown prince. This spacious cave is up to 100 meters wide and has 8.79 kilometers of passages, making it one of the longest in Japan after Akkadō cave, and one of the longest in Asia. At the present time an about one-kilometer-long section of the cave is open to the public as a sightseeing course, with a walkway and bridge system, entering at the cave's lowest point and exiting via an artificial elevator. This portion of the cave is also well decorated with a variety of large and colorful speleothems.

== Gallery ==
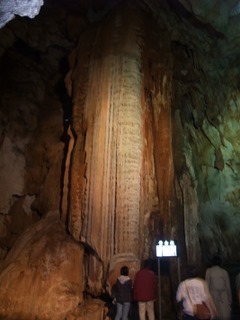
Stalactite called "Gold Column"

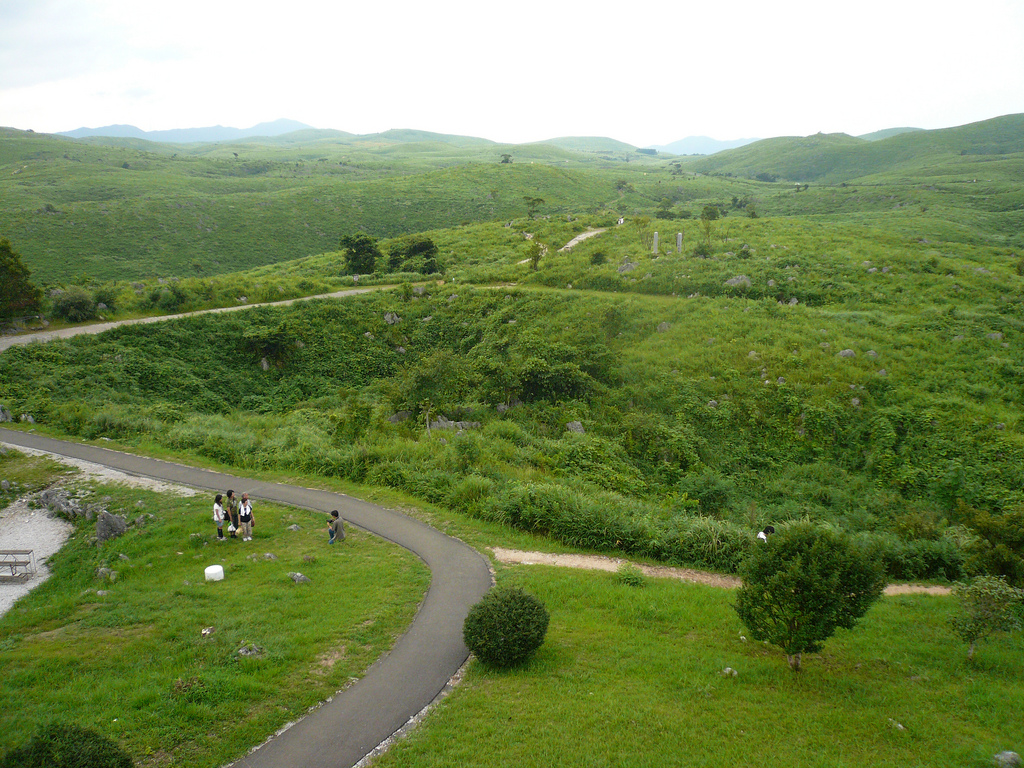
View of Karst landscape

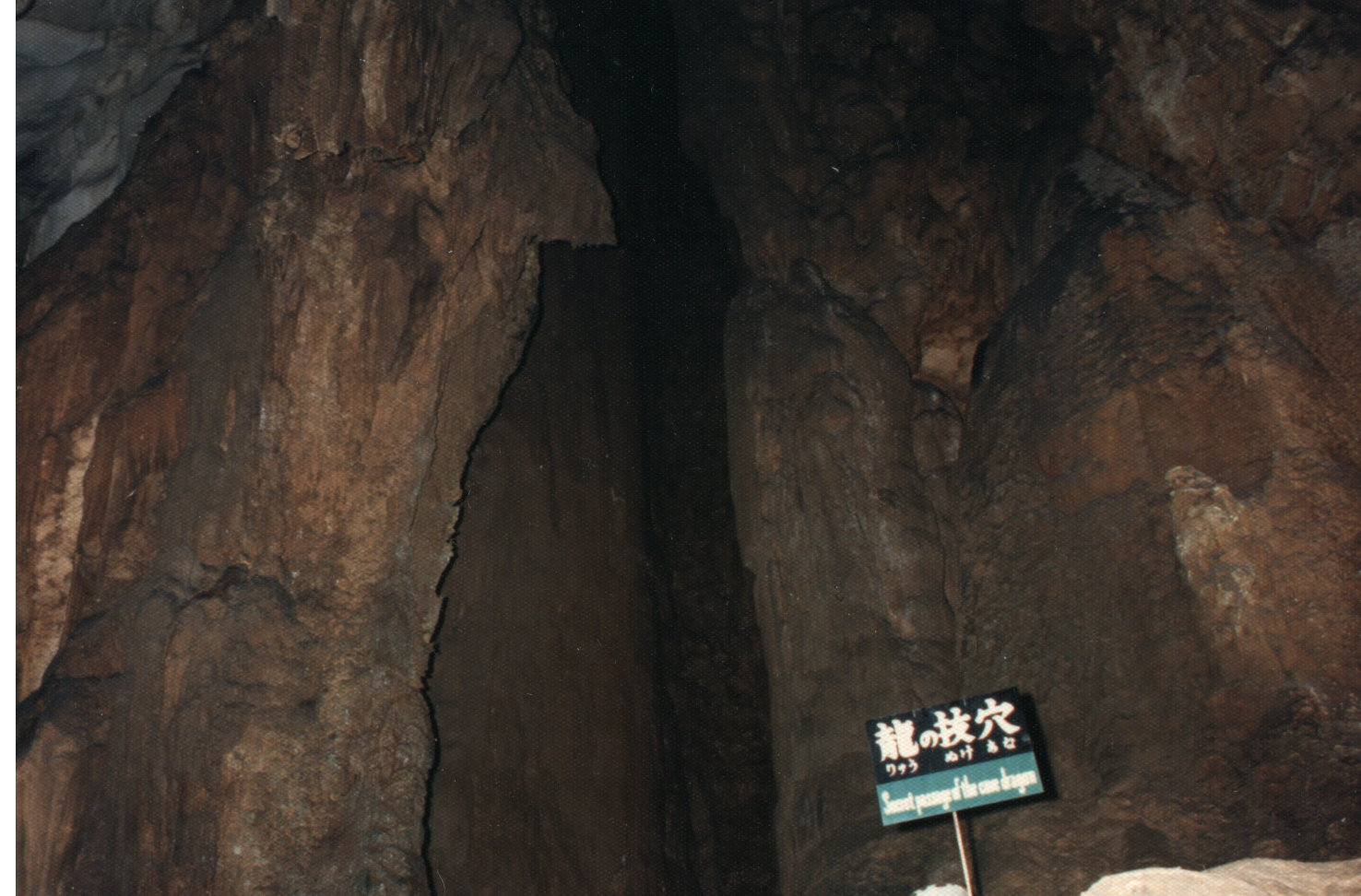
Inside Akiyoshidō caves

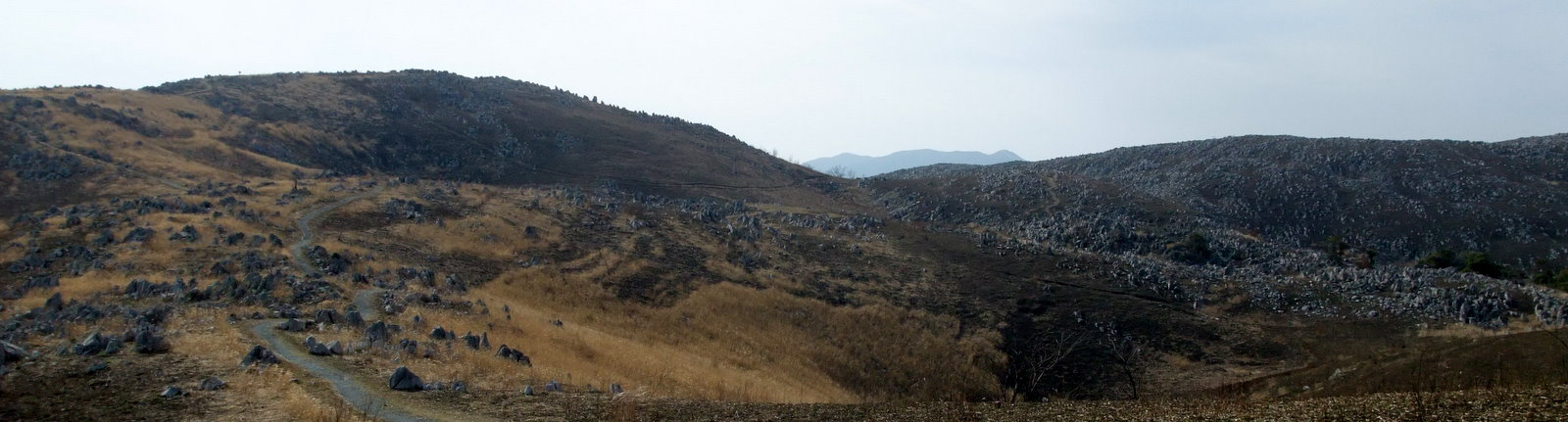
View of Karst topography

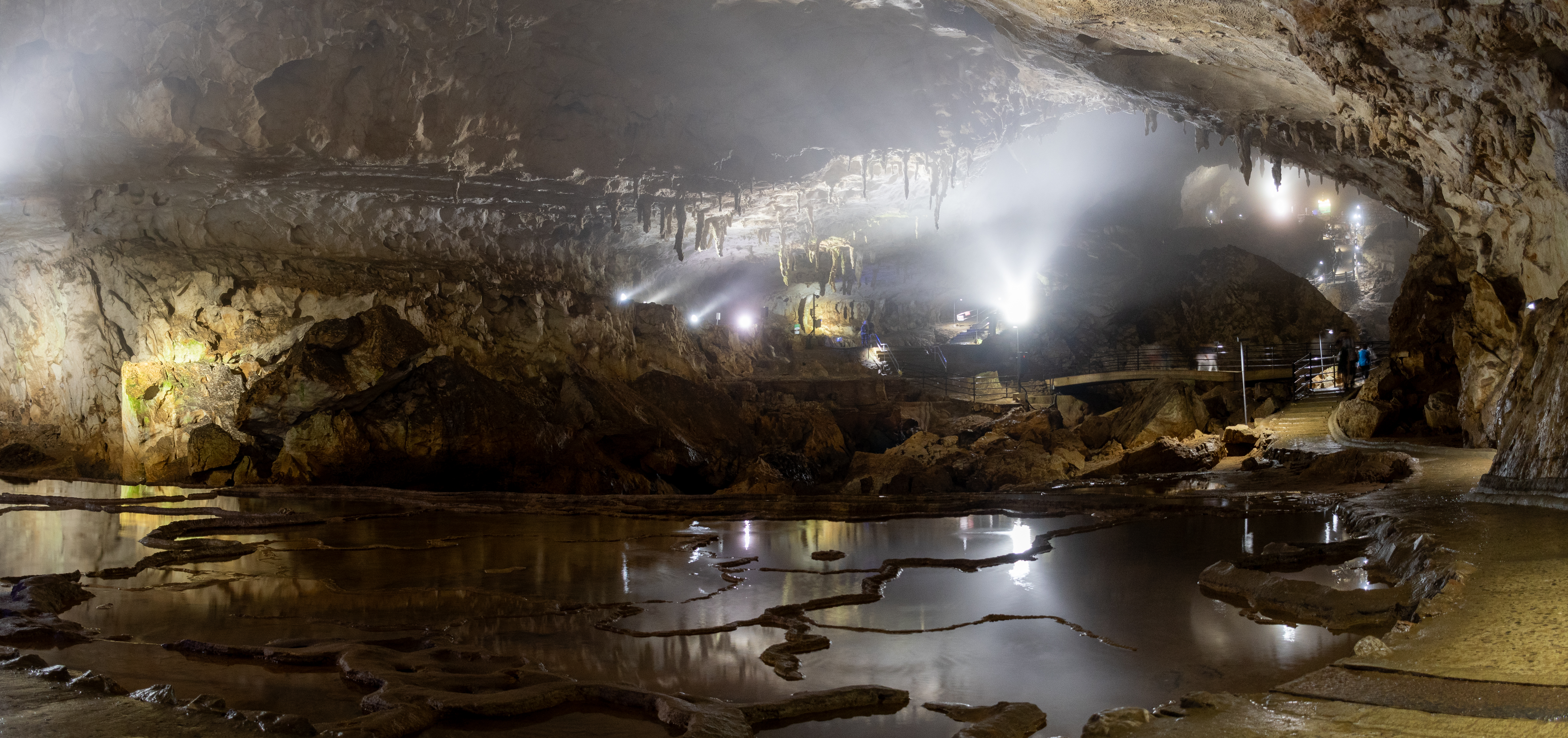
Interior of Akiyoshidō

== See also ==
- List of national parks of Japan
- Ramsar sites in Japan
