= List of Ramsar sites in Japan =

The Ramsar Convention on Wetlands of International Importance especially as Waterfowl Habitat is an international treaty for the conservation and sustainable use of wetlands. Adopted in 1971, it entered into force in 1975 and as of February 2026 had 172 contracting parties. Japan was the 24th party to accede, on 17 October 1980. Kushiro-shitsugen was the first of Japan's 54 Ramsar sites as of February 2026, with a total surface area of 1,661 square kilometres (641 sq mi).

== Designated sites ==
Name	Prefecture	Municipality	Altitude	Area	Designated	Image	National park status	Coords.	Ref.
Kutcharo-ko (クッチャロ湖)	Hokkaido	Hamatonbetsu	1–2 m	1,607 ha	1989		N/A	45°09′N 142°20′E	
Sarobetsu-genya (サロベツ原野)	Hokkaido	Horonobe, Toyotomi	3–7 m	2,560 ha	2005		Rishiri-Rebun-Sarobetsu National Park	45°03′N 141°42′E	
Tofutsu-ko (濤沸湖)	Hokkaido	Abashiri, Koshimizu	1 m	900 ha	2005		Abashiri Quasi-National Park	43°56′N 144°24′E	
Uryunuma-shitsugen (雨竜沼湿原)	Hokkaido	Uryū	850–900 m	624 ha	2005		Shokanbetsu-Teuri-Yagishiri Quasi-National Park	43°41′N 141°36′E	
Notsuke-hanto and Notsuke-wan (野付半島・野付湾)	Hokkaido	Betsukai, Shibetsu	0–10 m	6,053 ha	2005		N/A	43°34′N 145°16′E	
Akan-ko (阿寒湖)	Hokkaido	Kushiro	420 m	1,318 ha	2005		Akan National Park	43°27′N 144°06′E	
Miyajima-numa (宮島沼)	Hokkaido	Bibai	13 m	41 ha	2002		N/A	43°20′N 141°43′E	
Furen-ko & Shunkuni-tai (風蓮湖 春国岱)	Hokkaido	Betsukai, Nemuro	1 m	6,139 ha	2005		N/A	43°17′N 145°21′E	
Kushiro-shitsugen (釧路湿原)	Hokkaido	Kushiro City, Kushiro Town, Shibecha, Tsurui	3–10 m	7,863 ha	2005		Kushiro-shitsugen National Park	43°09′N 144°26′E	
Kiritappu-shitsugen (霧多布湿原)	Hokkaido	Hamanaka	0–3 m	2,504 ha	1993		N/A	43°05′N 145°05′E	
Akkeshi-ko & Bekambeushi-shitsugen (厚岸湖 別寒辺牛湿原)	Hokkaido	Akkeshi	0–20 m	5,277 ha	1993		N/A	43°03′N 144°54′E	
Utonai-ko (ウトナイ湖)	Hokkaido	Tomakomai	1–5 m	510 ha	1991		N/A	42°42′N 141°43′E	
Onuma (大沼)	Hokkaido	Nanae	1–5 m	510 ha	2012		Ōnuma Quasi-National Park	41°59′N 140°40′E	
Hotokenuma (仏沼)	Aomori	Misawa	0–10 m	222 ha	2005		N/A	40°49′N 141°22′E	
Izu-numa and Uchi-numa (伊豆沼・内沼)	Miyagi	Kurihara, Tome	7 m	559 ha	1985		N/A	38°43′N 141°06′E	
Kabukuri-numa and the surrounding rice paddies (蕪栗沼・周辺水田)	Miyagi	Kurihara, Tome, Ōsaki	5.7 m	423 ha	2005		N/A	38°38′N 141°06′E	
Kejo-numa (化女沼)	Miyagi	Ōsaki	25.9 m	34 ha	2008		N/A	38°37′N 141°57′E	
Shizugawa-wan (志津川湾)	Miyagi	Minamisanriku	0 m	5,793 ha	2018		Sanriku Fukkō National Park	38°40′N 141°30′E	
Oyama Kami-ike and Shimo-ike (大山上池・下池)	Yamagata	Tsuruoka	12 m	39 ha	2008		N/A	38°44′N 139°45′E	
Lake Inawashiro (猪苗代湖)	Fukushima	Aizuwakamatsu, Inawashiro, Kōriyama	514 m	10,960 ha	2025		Bandai-Asahi National Park	37°28′N 140°05′E	
Oze (尾瀬)	Fukushima, Gunma, Niigata	Hinoemata, Katashina, Uonuma	1,400–2,356 m	8,711 ha	2005		Oze National Park	36°53′N 139°11′E	
Hinuma (涸沼)	Ibaraki	Hokota, Ōarai	0 m	935 ha	2015		N/A	36°16′N 140°30′E	
Watarase-yusuichi (渡良瀬遊水地)	Ibaraki, Tochigi, Gunma, Saitama	Koga, Tochigi, Oyama, Nogi, Itakura, Kazo	2–23 m	2,861 ha	2012		N/A	36°14′N 139°41′E	
Oku-Nikko-shitsugen (奥日光の湿原)	Tochigi	Nikkō	1,400–1,475 m	260 ha	2005		Nikkō National Park	36°47′N 139°26′E	
Yoshigadaira Wetlands (芳ヶ平湿地群)	Gunma	Kusatsu, Nakanojō	1,200–2,160 m	887 ha	2015		Jōshin'etsu-kōgen National Park	36°39′N 138°33′E	
Yatsu-higata (谷津干潟)	Chiba	Narashino	0 m	40 ha	1993		N/A	35°40′N 140°00′E	
Kasai Marine Park (葛西臨海公園)	Tokyo	Edogawa	-4–4 m	366 ha	2018		N/A	35°38′N 139°51′E	
Hyo-ko (瓢湖)	Niigata	Agano	8.6 m	24 ha	2008		N/A	37°50′N 139°14′E	
Sakata (佐潟)	Niigata	Niigata	5 m	76 ha	1996		Sado-Yahiko-Yoneyama Quasi-National Park	37°49′N 138°53′E	
Tateyama Midagahara and Dainichidaira (立山弥陀ヶ原・大日平)	Toyama	Tateyama	1,040–2,120 m	574 ha	2012		Chūbu-Sangaku National Park	36°34′N 137°32′E	
Katano-kamoike (片野鴨池)	Ishikawa	Kaga	2.5–8 m	10 ha	1993		Echizen-Kaga Kaigan Quasi-National Park	36°19′N 136°17′E	
Nakaikemi-shichi (中池見湿地)	Fukui	Tsuruga	45 m	87 ha	2012		Echizen-Kaga Kaigan Quasi-National Park	35°39′N 136°05′E	
Mikata-goko (三方五湖)	Fukui	Wakasa, Mihama	0 m	1,110 ha	2005		Wakasawan Quasi-National Park	35°33′N 135°52′E	
Tokai Hilly Land Spring-fed Mires (東海丘陵湧水湿地群)	Aichi	Toyota	190–244 m	22.5 ha	2012		Aichi Kōgen Quasi-National Park	35°08′N 137°21′E	
Fujimae-higata (藤前干潟)	Aichi	Nagoya, Tobishima	-4-1 m	323 ha	2002		N/A	35°04′N 136°50′E	
Biwa-ko (琵琶湖)	Shiga	10 cities	86 m	65,984 ha	1993		Biwako Quasi-National Park	35°15′N 136°05′E	
Lower Maruyama River and the surrounding rice paddies (円山川下流域・周辺水田)	Hyōgo	Toyooka	0–20 m	1,094 ha	2012		Sanin Kaigan National Park	35°59′N 134°59′E	
Kushimoto Coral Communities (串本沿岸海域)	Wakayama	Kushimoto	-20–0 m	574 ha	2005		Yoshino-Kumano National Park	33°28′N 135°44′E	
Nakaumi (中海)	Tottori, Shimane	Yonago, Sakaiminato, Matsue, Yasugi	0 m	8,043 ha	2005		N/A	35°32′N 133°09′E	
Shinji-ko (宍道湖)	Shimane	Matsue, Izumo	0.3 m	7,652 ha	2005		N/A	35°26′N 132°57′E	
Miyajima (宮島)	Hiroshima	Hatsukaichi	0–80 m	142 ha	2012		Setonaikai National Park	34°14′N 132°17′E	
Akiyoshidai Groundwater System (秋吉台地下水系)	Yamaguchi	Mine	80–426 m	563 ha	2005		Akiyoshidai Quasi-National Park	34°15′N 131°18′E	
Higashiyoka-higata (東よか干潟)	Saga	Saga	-3–1 m	218 ha	2015		N/A	33°10′N 103°15′E	
Hizen Kashima-higata (肥前鹿島干潟)	Saga	Kashima	-3-1 m	57 ha	2015		N/A	33°6′N 130°7′E	
Arao-higata (荒尾干潟)	Kumamoto	Kumamoto	0 m	754 ha	2012		N/A	32°58′N 130°25′E	
Kuju Bogatsuru and Tadewara-shitsugen (くじゅう坊ガツル・タデ原湿原)	Ōita	Kokonoe, Taketa	1,000–1,270 m	91 ha	2005		Aso Kujū National Park	33°06′N 131°15′E	
Imuta-ike (藺牟田池)	Kagoshima	Satsumasendai	296 m	60 ha	2005		N/A	31°49′N 130°28′E	
Izumi Wintering Habitat of Cranes (出水ツルの越冬地)	Kagoshima	Izumi		478 ha	2021		N/A	32°06′N 130°16′E	
Yakushima Nagata-hama (屋久島永田浜)	Kagoshima	Yakushima	<10 m	10 ha	2005		Kirishima-Yaku National Park	30°24′N 130°25′E	
Streams in Kumejima (久米島の渓流・湿地)	Okinawa	Kumejima	120–280 m	255 ha	2009		N/A	26°22′N 126°46′E	
Kerama-shoto Coral Reef (慶良間諸島海域)	Okinawa	Zamami, Tokashiki	0 m	353 ha	2005		Kerama Shotō National Park	26°12′N 127°21′E	
Manko (漫湖)	Okinawa	Tomigusuku, Naha	-0.5 m	58 ha	1999		N/A	26°11′N 127°41′E	
Yonaha-wan (与那覇湾)	Okinawa	Miyakojima	0 m	704 ha	2012		N/A	24°45′N 125°16′E	
Nagura-Ampuru (名蔵アンパル)	Okinawa	Ishigaki	0 m	157 ha	2005		N/A	24°23′N 124°08′E	

== See also ==
- List of Ramsar sites worldwide
- List of national parks of Japan
- Wildlife Protection Areas in Japan
