= Notsuke Peninsula =

Peninsula on the east coast of Hokkaido, Japan

Notsuke Peninsula 野付半島
- Peninsula
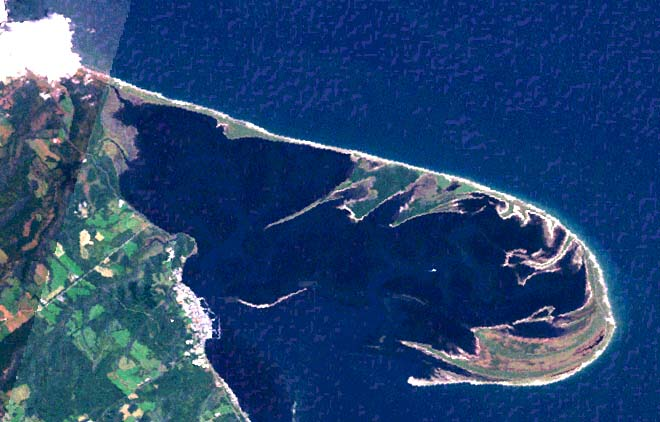

- Coordinates: 43°36′12″N 145°17′34″E
- Location: Shibetsu and Betsukai, Hokkaidō, Japan

Dimensions
  - Length: 26 kilometres (16 mi); 28 kilometres (17 mi)

Ramsar Wetland
- Official name: Notsuke-hanto and Notsuke-wan
- Designated: 8 November 2005
- Reference no.: 1552

The Notsuke Peninsula (野付半島, Notsuke hantō) is a peninsula on the east coast of Hokkaidō, Japan, with its northwestern base in Shibetsu and southeast tip in Betsukai. The name is derived from the Ainu for jawbone, notkeu (ノッケウ), purportedly due to the landform's visual resemblance to that of a whale. The curved peninsula, the longest sandspit in the country, with a length of some 26 kilometres (16 mi) to 28 kilometres (17 mi), extends into the Nemuro Strait, which lies between Shiretoko Peninsula, Nemuro Peninsula, and the disputed island of Kunashir in the Sea of Okhotsk; it was formed by the deposition of sand sediment carried by the currents in the strait, and itself forms and largely encloses Notsuke Bay. There remain on the peninsula traces of Satsumon culture pit dwellings, while during the Edo period samurai were stationed at a checkpoint controlling the crossing to Kunashiri. It is said that from the Edo period to the beginning of the Meiji period there was a settlement known as Kiraku (キラク) at the tip of the peninsula, with streets lined with samurai residences and even pleasure quarters, but this is not shown on contemporary maps and is poorly attested in the literature. Prominent features today include withered and eroded stretches of Sakhalin fir (Abies sachalinensis) at Todowara (トドワラ) and Mongolian oak (Quercus crispula) at Narawara (ナラワラ), while to be found in the Notsuke Peninsula Primeval Flower Garden near Notsukezaki Lighthouse towards the eastern tip are the Kamchatka lily, Japanese iris, sea pea, Rosa rugosa, Eriophorum vaginatum, and Hemerocallis esculenta (エゾカンゾウ). The c.15 kilometres (9.3 mi) stretch of Hokkaido Prefectural Road Route 950 (ja) from the base of the peninsula to the nature centre is commonly known as the "Flower Road" (フラワーロード). Together with Notsuke Bay, Notsuke Peninsula has been designated a Ramsar Site, a Special Wildlife Protection Area, and an Important Bird Area, and forms part of Notsuke-Fūren Prefectural Natural Park.

== See also ==
- List of Ramsar sites in Japan
- Hokkaidō Heritage
- Nemuro Peninsula Chashi Sites
