= Betsukai =

Betsukai 別海町
- Town
- Flag Emblem

- Location of Betsukai in Hokkaido (Nemuro Subprefecture)

- Location in Japan
- Coordinates: 43°24′N 145°7′E
- Country: Japan
- Region: Hokkaido
- Prefecture: Hokkaido (Nemuro Subprefecture)
- District: Notsuke

Area
  - Total: 1,320.15 km^{2} (509.71 sq mi)

Population (October 1, 2020)
  - Total: 14,380
  - Density: 10.89/km^{2} (28.21/sq mi)
- Time zone: UTC+09:00 (JST)
- Climate: Dfb
- Website: betsukai.jp

Betsukai (別海町, Betsukai-chō) is a town located in Nemuro Subprefecture, Hokkaido, Japan. As of August 2026, the town has an estimated population of 13,631, and an area of 1,320.15 km^{2} (the second largest in Hokkaido). The town is primarily agricultural, with numerous dairy farms.

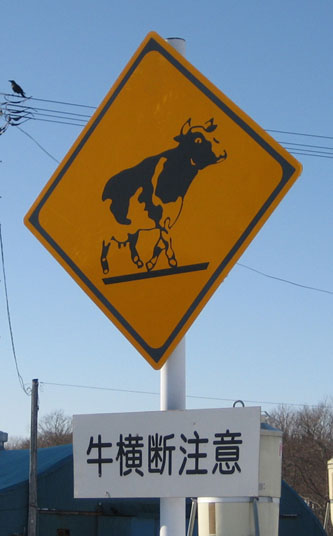
Cow crossing street sign in Betsukai

== Overview ==
Located on the eastern edge of Hokkaido, Betsukai faces the Kuril Islands across the Notsuke Peninsula. Its total area is the third largest among all towns (町, machi) in Japan (after Ashoro and Engaru, both also in Hokkaido), the ninth largest among all municipalities in Japan, and the fifth largest in all of Hokkaido. It has the largest habitable land area in the country.

The town is composed of gently sloping hills with pastures carved out of the wilderness stretching across nearly the entire area. When viewed from above, large sections of the town appear in a checkerboard pattern due to forested windbreaks that protect animals from the region's occasional harsh weather.

Various settlements are located throughout the town, including Betsukai, Nakanishibetsu, Nakashunbetsu, Nishishunbetsu, Nishishunbetsu-Ekimae, Kamishunbetsu, Kamifuren, Honbetsukai, and Odaito. The town hall is located in the town center of the main Betsukai urban area.

The southwest of the town contains the Ministry of Defense's Japan Ground Self-Defense Force Betsukai Garrison (Air Self-Defense Force Kenebetsu Air Base) and the Yausubetsu Training Area, which together cover 17,192 hectares. The town has hosted artillery training relocated from across Prefectural Route 104 in Kin, Okinawa. Several times a year, large-scale live-fire exercises are conducted there by the U.S. military.

== History ==
The earliest settlement in the area was along the eastern coast, where fishing was the main livelihood. From the late Meiji 30s (around 1897–1906), settlers began moving inland, where field crop farming became the main activity.

On April 1, 1923, six villages, including the former Betsukai Village, merged to form a new Betsukai Village, which corresponds to the present-day area of Betsukai Town. The village office was originally located in the Honbetsukai coastal district, but was relocated in 1933 to present-day Betsukai (then called Nishibetsu) as the inland population increased.

From the early Shōwa period, agriculture gradually shifted from crop farming to dairy farming, though development was slowed by the vast size of the land. In 1956, with financing from the World Bank, the Konsen Pilot Farm method was introduced, enabling mechanized land development. In 1973, construction of new dairy farming villages began, laying the foundation for the extensive dairy farming region that exists today.

The village was elevated to town status in 1971.

== Etymology ==
The name Betsukai is said to derive from the Ainu words pet-kai ("river bend") or pet-kaye ("to bend a river"), referring to the winding course of the Nishibetsu River at its mouth in the Honbetsukai area, where the original village office was located. The present-day Betsukai district was originally called Nishibetsu (西別), from the Ainu nu-us-pet ("river of abundant fish"), but was renamed after the office relocation.

Both Betsukai (べつかい) and Bekkai (べっかい) were historically used as pronunciations of the town name. In 1971, when the village became a town, the official reading was standardized as Betsukai. However, on March 10, 2009, the then-mayor declared at a town assembly that both readings are acceptable. In official contexts such as government documents, broadcasts, and road signs, the form Betsukai continues to be used.

== Climate ==
Climate data for Betsukai (1991−2020 normals, extremes 1977−present)
Month	Jan	Feb	Mar	Apr	May	Jun	Jul	Aug	Sep	Oct	Nov	Dec	Year
Record high °C (°F)	8.4 (47.1)	9.9 (49.8)	16.3 (61.3)	27.3 (81.1)	36.6 (97.9)	34.7 (94.5)	35.1 (95.2)	35.4 (95.7)	31.9 (89.4)	25.5 (77.9)	21.0 (69.8)	14.2 (57.6)	36.6 (97.9)
Mean daily maximum °C (°F)	−1.2 (29.8)	−0.9 (30.4)	3.0 (37.4)	9.3 (48.7)	14.9 (58.8)	17.8 (64.0)	21.2 (70.2)	22.8 (73.0)	20.7 (69.3)	15.5 (59.9)	8.7 (47.7)	1.6 (34.9)	11.1 (52.0)
Daily mean °C (°F)	−6.7 (19.9)	−6.5 (20.3)	−1.9 (28.6)	3.6 (38.5)	8.7 (47.7)	12.3 (54.1)	16.2 (61.2)	18.1 (64.6)	15.4 (59.7)	9.5 (49.1)	2.9 (37.2)	−3.8 (25.2)	5.6 (42.2)
Mean daily minimum °C (°F)	−13.6 (7.5)	−13.8 (7.2)	−7.7 (18.1)	−1.8 (28.8)	3.1 (37.6)	7.9 (46.2)	12.4 (54.3)	14.3 (57.7)	10.5 (50.9)	3.3 (37.9)	−3.2 (26.2)	−10.1 (13.8)	0.1 (32.2)
Record low °C (°F)	−31.3 (−24.3)	−33.7 (−28.7)	−25.4 (−13.7)	−14.2 (6.4)	−6.0 (21.2)	−2.7 (27.1)	1.8 (35.2)	4.1 (39.4)	−0.7 (30.7)	−7.0 (19.4)	−15.6 (3.9)	−23.8 (−10.8)	−33.7 (−28.7)
Average precipitation mm (inches)	38.2 (1.50)	27.4 (1.08)	55.2 (2.17)	79.0 (3.11)	107.2 (4.22)	111.4 (4.39)	121.9 (4.80)	154.9 (6.10)	184.2 (7.25)	125.9 (4.96)	79.0 (3.11)	63.8 (2.51)	1,148 (45.20)
Average snowfall cm (inches)	84 (33)	72 (28)	75 (30)	26 (10)	1 (0.4)	0 (0)	0 (0)	0 (0)	0 (0)	0 (0)	11 (4.3)	66 (26)	330 (130)
Average precipitation days (≥ 1.0 mm)	6.4	5.0	7.8	9.0	10.7	9.7	11.1	12.1	11.6	9.4	8.7	7.9	109.4
Average snowy days (≥ 3 cm)	10.1	8.2	8.6	3.2	0.2	0	0	0	0	0	1.4	7.6	39.3
Mean monthly sunshine hours	146.3	150.4	181.3	163.6	165.8	132.0	108.6	117.4	138.2	158.0	148.7	143.7	1,756
Source: Japan Meteorological Agency

== Demographics ==
Per Japanese census data, the population of Betsukai has declined in recent decades.

Historical population
Year	Pop.	±%
1970	18,296	—
1980	19,035	+4.0%
1990	18,297	−3.9%
2000	16,910	−7.6%
2010	15,855	−6.2%
2020	14,380	−9.3%

== Education ==
=== Elementary schools ===
- Betsukai Chuo Elementary School (別海中央小学校, Betsukai Chūō Shōgakkō)
- Notsuke Elementary School (野付小学校, Notsuke Shōgakkō)
- Kaminishishunbetsu Elementary School (上西春別小学校, Kaminishishunbetsu Shōgakkō)
- Nakashunbetsu Elementary School (中春別小学校, Nakashunbetsu Shōgakkō)
- Kamishunbetsu Elementary School (上春別小学校, Kamishunbetsu Shōgakkō)
- Kamifuren Elementary School (上風連小学校, Kamifūren Shōgakkō)
- Nishishunbetsu Elementary School (西春別小学校, Nishishunbetsu Shōgakkō) – Closed in 2026
- Nakanishibetsu Elementary School (中西別小学校, Nakanishibetsu Shōgakkō) – Closed in 2025

=== Middle schools ===
- Betsukai Chuo Junior High School (別海中央中学校, Betsukai Chūō Chūgakkō)
- Notsuke Junior High School (野付中学校, Notsuke Chūgakkō)
- Kaminishishunbetsu Junior High School (上西春別中学校, Kaminishishunbetsu Chūgakkō)
- Nakashunbetsu Junior High School (中春別中学校, Nakashunbetsu Chūgakkō)
- Kamishunbetsu Junior High School (上春別中学校, Kamishunbetsu Chūgakkō)
- Kamifuren Junior High School (上風連中学校, Kamifūren Chūgakkō)
- Nishishunbetsu Junior High School (西春別中学校, Nishishunbetsu Chūgakkō) – Closed in 2026
- Nakanishibetsu Junior High School (中西別中学校, Nakanishibetsu Chūgakkō) – Closed in 2025

=== High schools ===
- Hokkaido Betsukai High School (北海道別海高等学校, Hokkaidō Betsukai Kōtō Gakkō)

== Mascot ==
Ryoushi-kun, the town's mascot

Betsukai's mascot is Ryoushi-kun (りょウシくん) whose real name is Ryoushi Betsukai (別海りょウシ, Betsukai Ryoushi). He is a bull that looks like a cow. He is a fisherman, and a milk farmer. His friends are Hotatetchi (ホタテっち) (who is a Yesso scallop), Ebumaru (エビまる) (who is a shrimp), Milkchi (みるちー) (who is a milk bottle), Sakezo (サケゾー) (who is a salmon), Asarin (あさりん) (who is a Japanese littleneck clam), Hocki (ホッキー, Hokkī) (who is a Sakhalin surf clam) and Shiratori-san (シラトリさん) (who is a white swan). He was unveiled on 30 June 2013.

== Notable people ==
- Shiho Kusunose (born 1969), Olympian speed skater
- Arisa Go (born 1987), Olympian speed skater
- Saya Kawamoto (born 1998), former member of the Japanese idol girl group AKB48
- Wataru Morishige (born 2000), Olympian speed skater
- Kanae Kijima, a Japanese fraudster and serial killer known as The Konkatsu Killer, was raised in Betsukai
- Chieko Baisho and her husband, Reijiro Koroku, owned a villa in the town and composed the song "Betsukai Sanka" (別海讃歌)
