= Setsuri =

Setsuri may refer to:

- Setsuri, a new religious movement better known as Providence (religion)
- Setsuri River, a river in Japan

== See also ==
- Setsuri Tsuzuki, a manga artist, see Broken Angels and Calling You
