= Monggeumpo Taryeong =

Folk song of the northwestern areas of the Hwanghae and Pyeongan provinces of Korea

- Hangul: 몽금포타령
- Hanja: 夢金浦타령
- RR: Monggeumpo taryeong
- MR: Monggŭmp'o t'aryŏng
- IPA: [moŋ.ɡɯm.pʰo tʰaːɾjʌŋ]

"Monggeumpo Taryeong" (Korean: 몽금포타령; Hanja: 夢金浦타령) is a representative Korean folk song (minyo (Note: specifically Seodo minyo.)) of the northwestern areas of the Hwanghae and Pyeongan provinces of North Korea. The song describes the lives of local fishermen and the surrounding port, village, hills, and scenery. The song is about lovers in a beautiful harbor who wait and sing for the return of their loved ones, who are sailors.

The harbor in the song is Monggeumpo Harbor in Jangyeon-gun (administrative division), near the Jangsangot mountain range in Hwanghae Province. It is sung in a nasal tone to connote sorrow and melancholy. The song was composed by Kim In-sook (김인숙; 金仁淑; Kim Insuk), and first became popular in the late Joseon dynasty due to social change. The song follows the Jungmori Jangdan beat (중모리장단), which is also used in pansori and sanjo. The song can also be played in the slower Gutgeori Jangdan beat, which also fits its rhythm and tone. An alternative name for the song is "Jangsangot Taryeong" (장산곶타령; 長山串타령).

== History ==
"Monggeumpo Taryeong" originated in the Hwanghae and Pyeongan regions of Korea. The song's musical features can be traced to the local folk song "Anju Aewongok" (Korean: 안주애원곡) from the Pyeongan region. "Monggeumpo Taryeong" first became more widely popular in the late Joseon dynasty due to social change, and became a part of city entertainment culture. The song's verses were first confirmed in the Joseon Japgajip, (조선잡가집; 朝鮮雜歌集; Chosŏnjapkajip), which the publishing house Shinguseorim (신구서림; 新舊書林; Sin'gusŏrim) published in 1918. "Monggeumpo Taryeong" is the subject of Kim Seong-tae's (김성태; Kim Sŏngt'ae) 1944 Capriccio for Symphonic Orchestra. In the early 21st century, the song is used as musical curriculum in textbooks used in South Korean schools, and is sung as an arranged choral song. Gugak (national songs) such as "Monggeumpo Taryeong", however, may be removed from textbooks in the future. Modern singers sing "Monggeumpo Taryeong" due to its popularity.

== Composition ==
"Monggeumpo Taryeong" is unique because it differs from the rhythm and beat of other folk songs of the Hwanghae and Pyeongan provinces. The song is based on Seodo folk songs but it also shows the slight influence of Western music because the melody progression is different. It does not follow the typical features of regional sushimgatori but instead uses the ban-gyeongtori style. Because "Monggeumpo Taryeong" is easier to sing than other Seodo folk songs, it said to be more popular. On the Western scale of musical notes, the song uses five pitches; D, F, G, A, and C. The D note is the modal center, the F note is performed in a descending manner, the G note is performed with downward vibrato, and the A is played with an ascending vibrato. In Seodo folk terminology, the musical use of this kind of song is called bansushimgatori. The verses are performed in four jangdans and the refrain in two jangdans (beat/tempo). The lyrics and refrain of the song may slightly differ in each version.

== Background ==
The harbor in the song is Monggeumpo Harbor in Jangyeon-gun, Hwanghae Province, North Korea. Monggeumpo Harbor is situated on a beach, and surrounded by hills that are covered with red rugosa roses. The sand is described as being fine and silk-like in quality, and has the names Baeksa (백사; 白沙), Geumsa (금사; 金沙), Myeongsa (鳴) (명사; 鳴沙), and Myeongsa (明) (명사; 明沙). It is called Myeongsa (鳴) because of the sound made when walked on barefoot. The sand is said to blow into dunes because it is thin. The nearby ocean water is described as clear and beautiful.

Korean philosopher Yi I described the harbor and beach as:

송림 사이 거닐다 보니 낮 바람 시원하고
금모래에서 놀다 보니 어느덧 석양이 지는구나
천년 지나 아랑의 발길 어디서 찾을 것인가
고운 주름 다 걷히니 수평선은 더욱 멀어라

Which translates to:

As I walk among the pine trees, the daytime wind is cool.
After playing in the golden sand, the sunset will set sooner or later;
After one thousand years, where will I find Arang's footsteps?
All the fine creases are gone (sand?), the horizon is even farther away.

The Jangsanggot (장산곶; 長山串) mountain range was named from its description as extending deep into the Yellow Sea (Seohae, 서해). In the Joseon dynasty, Arangpoyeong (아랑포영) and Jonipojin (조니포진) were installed at the harbor, and it served as an important, strategic location for national defense when Joseon Navy forces were deployed. Gumipo is located to the southeast of Monggeumpo; American missionary Etherwood first discovered and developed the sacred scenery of that place. Within the lyrics, "bongjuk" appears.

== Lyrics ==
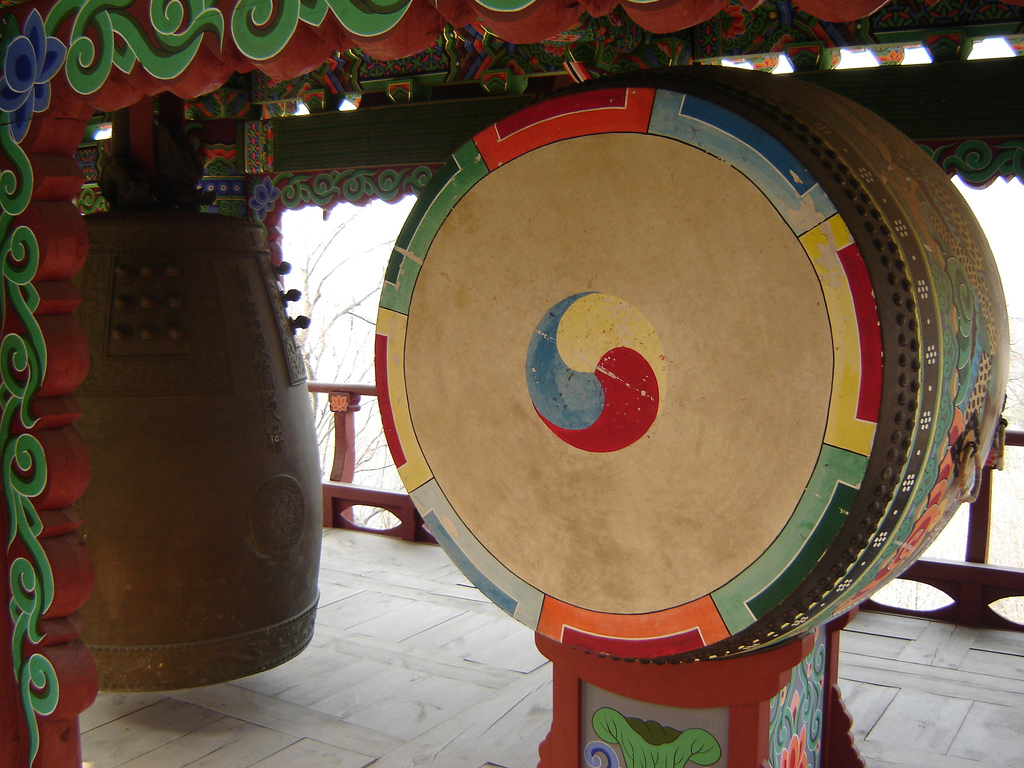
A Korean Buk (drum)

The refrain of "Monggeumpo Taryeong" is repeated after every verse. In some versions, the refrain may be slightly different each time it is sung. There are multiple versions of the song, with slightly differing lyrics and refrain.

In Hwanghae Province, bongjugeul badattda (봉죽을 받았다) means catching a large quantity of fish to fill a boat. In Pyojuneo, bongjuk usually means "porridge" or "receiving assistance".

Lyrics
Korean

장산곶 마루에 북소리 나더니 금일(今日)도 상봉(上峯)에 님 만나 보겠네
(후렴) 에헤이요 에헤이요 에헤이야 님 만나 보겠네

갈 길은 멀구요 행선(行船)은 더디니 늦바람 불라고 성황(城隍)님 조른다

님도 보구요 놀기도 하구요 몽금이 개암포 들렸다 가게나

바다에 흰돛 쌍쌍이 도으나 외로은 사랑엔 눈물만 겨워라

바람새 좋다고 돛 달지 말고요 몽금이 앞바다 놀다나 가지요

북소리 두둥둥 쳐울리면서 봉죽(鳳竹)을 받은 배 떠들어 오누나/옵네다

무정한 우리 님 말 없이 가더니 봉죽(鳳竹)을 받고서 돌아를 오셨네

임 실러 갈 적엔 반 돛을 달고요 임 싣고 올 적엔 온 돛을 단다네

가는 임 야속타 속태지 말고요 갔다가 올 때가 더 반갑답니다

장산곶 마루에 새 소식 들리니 원포귀범(遠浦歸帆)에 정든 임 오셨네

English Translation

At the peak of Jangsangot mountain a drum beats; I will meet my love there today.
(refrain) E-he-i-yo e-he-i-yo e-he-i-ya, I will meet my love.

I have a long way to go, the ship is moving slow; I pray again and again to the earth god to blow winds to move the ship.

I will see my love, and play along the way; I will stop by at the Mong-geum-yi gae-am-po (Harbor).

White sails turn in the sea; the lonely lover’s heart is filled with tears.

Just because the wind blows well, do not raise up the sail; Monggeum is offshore, stay and play with me instead.

As the drum goes doodoongdoong, boats that are full with fish come back to shore.

Our heartless lover left without a word, and came back after catching plentiful fish.

When I go to pick up my love, I put up half sails; and when I bring my love, I put up full sails.

My love, do not be fooled by making a promise (to go out to sea?), I love it more when you go and come back.

I hear new news from the top of Jangsangot mountain: on the boat returning from afar, my love has come.

== See also ==
- Pansori
- Doraji Taryeong
- Sae Taryeong
- Arirang
- Traditional music of Korea
