= Sae Taryeong =

Korean folk song of South Jeolla Province

- Hangul: 새타령
- Hanja: 새打令
- RR: Saetaryeong
- MR: Saet'aryŏng
- IPA: [sɛː.tʰa.ɾjʌ̹ŋ]

Saetaryeong
For KO subtitles press CC

Sae Taryeong (Korean: 새타령; Hanja: 새打令; lit. 'Bird song') is a representative folk song (minyo) of the Jeolla-namdo region of Korea, that describes the sounds and physical descriptions of a variety of birds. The song uses onomatopoeia to describe bird calls from the parrot to the crane. The song was composed by Kim Sam-jin (Korean: 김삼진; Hanja: 金三鎭), and the song first attained popularity after it was published in the pansori repertory Jeokbyeokga by Yi Dong-baek (Korean: 이동백). The song follows the Jungjungmori Jangdan beat (Korean: 중중모리 장단), which is also used in pansori and sanjo. The melodic pattern that the song follows is yukjabaegitori, which is a collection of four pitches with gestures (sikimsae), which consists of a vibrating note (tteoneunum), a note with no vibrato (cheong), appoggiatura (kkeokneunnum), and a note that goes upward in pitch while vibrating (eotcheong). An alternate hanja name for the song is "Bijoga" (Korean: 비조가; Hanja: 飛鳥歌).

== History ==
Sae taryeong originated in the Jeolla-do region of Korea. The song first attained popularity after it was published in the pansori repertory Jeokbyeokga. It is suggested that it has been sung since the late Joseon period. Singers such as Lee Seok-sun (reign of Heonjong), Il-chi (reign of Cheoljong), Park Yu-jeon (reign of Cheoljong), and Yi Dong-baek (Japanese occupation) were said to have been good at performing the song.

== Composition ==
The song is divided into two parts. The first part is about the scene of spring when swallows fly, and the second about the appearance and sounds of birds. The first section is sung in a fast jungjungmori rhythm using a tong-tong rhythm with 15 beats in 3 minutes and 4 beats. The second section is sung in a slower jungmori rhythm. As "Saetaryeong" is a long song, it can take over nine minutes to sing. It is regarded as a highly developed minyo due to the difficult singing method.

== Lyrics ==
Korean original (Hangul)

삼월 삼짇날 연자 날아들고 호접은 편편
나무 나무 속잎 나 가지 꽃 피었다 춘몽을 떨쳐
원산은 암암 근산은 중중
기암은 층층 메사니 울어
천리 시내는 청산으로 돌고
이 골 물이 주루루루루루 저 골 물이 콸콸
열의 열두 골 물이 한데로 합수쳐
천방자 지방자 월턱져 굽이쳐
방울이 버큼 져 건너 병풍석에다 아주 꽝꽝 마주 때려
산이 울렁거려 떠나간다 어디메로 가잔 말
아마도 네로구나 요런 경개가 또 있나

새가 날아든다 왼갖 잡새가 날아든다
새 중에는 봉황새, 만수문전의 풍년새
산고곡심 무인처 울림비조 뭇새들이
농춘화답에 짝을 지어 쌍거쌍래 날아든다
말 잘허는 앵무새, 춤 잘 추는 학 두루미
소탱이 쑥국~, 앵매기 쑤리루~, 대천에 비우~ 소루기

남풍 쫓아 떨쳐 나니 구만리장천 대붕
문왕이 나 계시사 기산 조양의 봉황새
요란~ 기우~ 깊은 밤 울고 날은 공작이
소선 적벽 칠월야 알연장명의 백학이

위보규인 임 계신 데 소식 전튼 앵무새
글자를 뉘가 전하리 가인상사 기러기
생증장액수고란하니 어여쁠사 채난새
약수 삼천 먼먼 길 서왕모 청조새
(이하 생략)

Hanja

三月 삼짇날 燕子 날아들고 蝴蝶은 翩翩
나무 나무 속잎 나 가지 꽃 피었다 春夢을 떨쳐
遠山은 暗暗 近山은 重重
奇巖은 層層 메사니 울어
天里 시내는 靑山으로 돌고
이 골 물이 주루루루루루 저 골 물이 콸콸
열의 열두 골 물이 한데로 合水쳐
天方자 地方자 월턱져 굽이쳐
방울이 버큼 져 건너 屛風石에다 아주 꽝꽝 마주 때려
산이 울렁거려 떠나간다 어디메로 가잔 말
아마도 네로구나 요런 景槪가 또 있나

새가 날아든다 왼갖 잡새가 날아든다
새 중에는 鳳凰새, 萬壽門前의 豐年새
山高谷深 無人處 鬱林飛鳥 뭇새들이
弄春和答에 짝을 지어 雙去雙來 날아든다
말 잘허는 鸚鵡새, 춤 잘 추는 鶴 두루미
소탱이 쑥국~, 앵매기 쑤리루~, 大天에 비우~ 소루기

南風 쫓아 떨쳐 나니 九萬里長天 大鵬
文王이 나 계시사 岐山 朝陽의 鳳凰새
요란~ 기우~ 깊은 밤 울고 날은 孔雀이
蘇仙 赤壁 七月夜 戞然長鳴의 白鶴이

爲報閨人 임 계신 데 消息 傳튼 鸚鵡새
글자를 뉘가 傳하리 佳人想思 기러기
生憎帳額繡孤鸞하니 어여쁠사 彩鸞새
弱水 三千 먼먼 길 西王母 靑鳥새
(이하 생략)

Revised Romanization

Samwol samjitnal yeonja naradeulgo hojeobeun pyeonpyeon
Namu namu sogip na gaji kkot pieotda chunmongeul tteolchyeo
Wonsaneun amam geunsaneun jungjung
Giameun cheungcheung mesani ureo
Cheonri sinaeneun cheongsaneuro dolgo
I gol muri jurururururu jeo gol muri kwalkwal
Yeorui yeoldu gol muri handero hapsuchyeo
Cheonbangja jibangja wolteokjyeo gubichyeo
Banguri beokeum jyeo geonneo byeongpungseogeda aju kkwangkkwang maju ttaeryeo
Sani ulleonggeoryeo tteonaganda eodimero gajan mal
Amado neroguna yoreon gyeonggaega tto itna

Saega naradeunda oengat japsaega naradeunda
Sae jungeneun bonghwangsae, mansumunjeonui pungnyeonsae
Sangogoksim muincheo ullimbijo mutsaedeuri
Nongchunhwadabe jjageul jieo ssanggeossangrae naradeunda
Mal jalheoneun aengmusae, chum jal chuneun hak durumi
Sotaengi ssukguk~, aengmaegi ssuriru~, daecheone biu~ sorugi

Nampung jjocha tteolchyeo nani gumanrijangcheon daebung
Munwangi na gyesisa gisan joyangui bonghwangsae
Yoran~ giu~ gipeun bam ulgo nareun gongjagi
Soseon jeokbyeok chirworya aryeonjangmyeongui baekhagi

Wibogyuin im gyesin de sosik jeonteun aengmusae
Geuljareul nwiga jeonhari gainsangsa gireogi
Saengjeungjangaeksugoranhani eoyeoppeulsa chaenansae
Yaksu samcheon meonmeon gil seowangmo cheongjosae
(iha saengryak)

English translation

On the third day of the third month, the swallow flies and the butterfly is elegant
The inner leaves of the trees, the branches, and flowers bloom, shaking off the spring dream
The far away mountain is deep and still, and the closer mountain is overlapping
The strange rocks' cries echo layer by layer
The stream of Tianli turns to the castle peak
The water in the valley flows ju-ru-ru-ru-ru-ru (onomatopoeia), the water in another goes kwal-kwal (gurgling)
The twelve valleys of the ten waters merge into one
The heaven and the earth bend over
Drops bubble into foam and cross over to the folding screen and hits very hard
The mountain is rumbling and leaves; there is talk about where to go
It's probably you, is there another scene like this?

Birds are flying, all sorts of birds are flying
The phoenix of all birds, in front of the Logevity Gate, bearer of good harvests
In a deep valley with high mountains: many birds fly in the forest on this sunny spring day
Birds fly in pairs, singing as though chatting about the pleasant spring weather
Parrots, good at chatting; cranes, good at dancing
Sot-daeng sing “sook-gook”; Ang-mae-gi sing “dduriru”; eagles sing “bi-woo”

I chased away the south wind and got shaken; ninety thousand li long Peng bird
King Wen the diviner; the phoenix of Qishang in the morning sun
Yoran Kiwoo (onomatopoeia) the deep night cries and the day is as a peacock
Su Shi, Red Cliffs, at a night of the seventh month, a long-calling white crane

Reporting to the lady over there, a message-passing parrot
Who will pass on the letters? The thoughts of a beautiful woman is the goose
I hate that the veil is embroidered with a lone Nan, a beautiful, colorful Nan
Yaksu River, a long, long three thousand [li]; Queen Mother of the West, azure bird
(omitted below)

== Gallery ==
A gallery of the birds mentioned within the song.

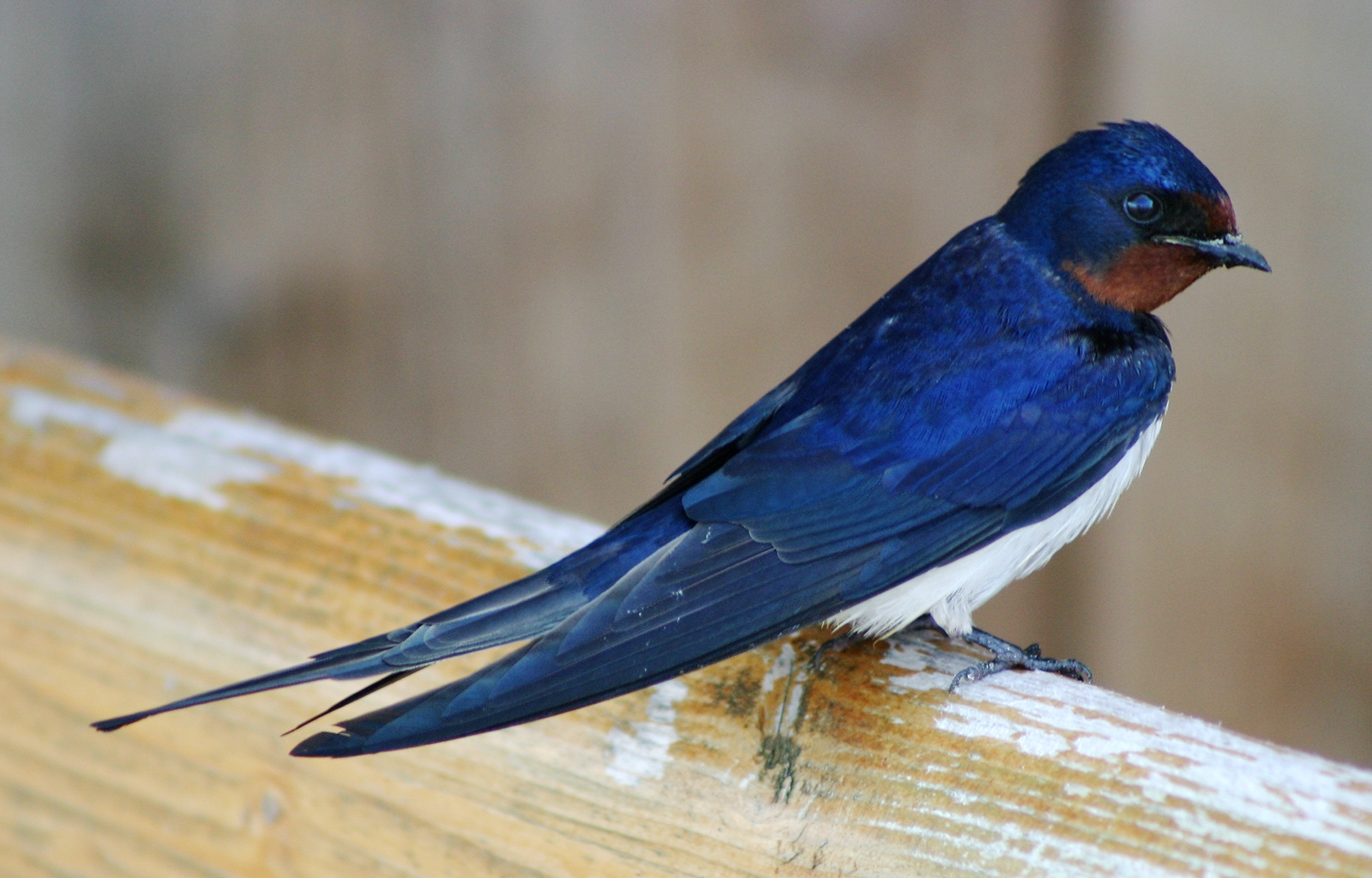
Swallow - Yeonja (燕子)

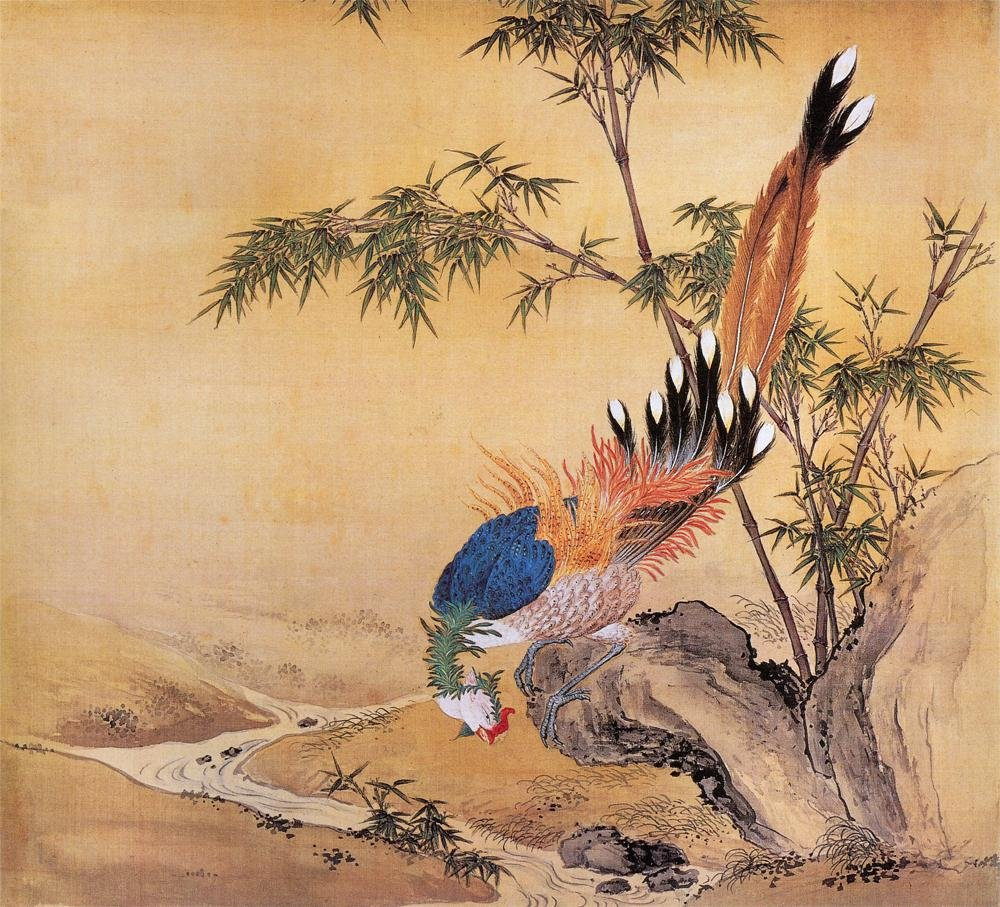
Phoenix - Bonghwang (鳳凰)

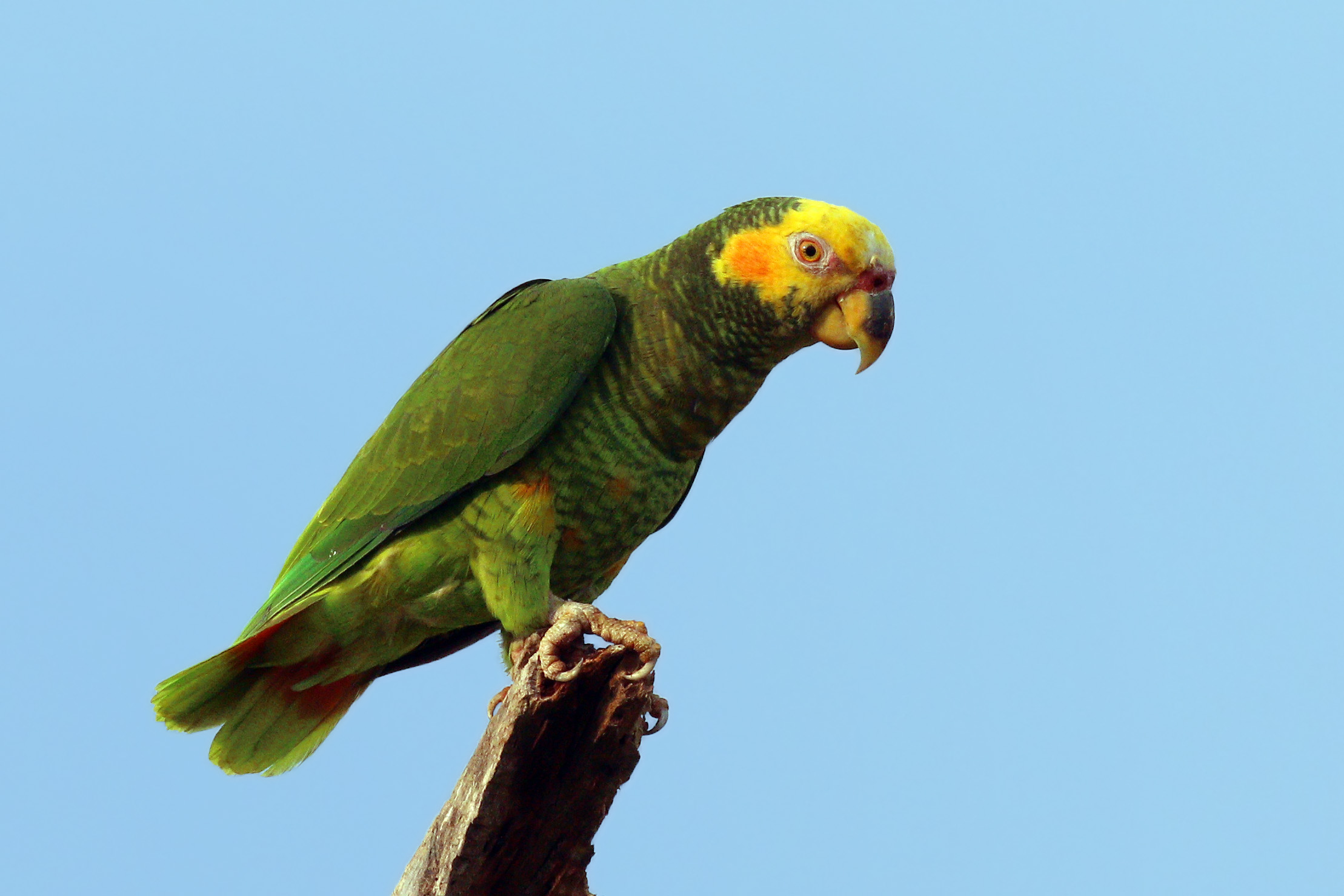
Generic parrot - Aengmu (鸚鵡)

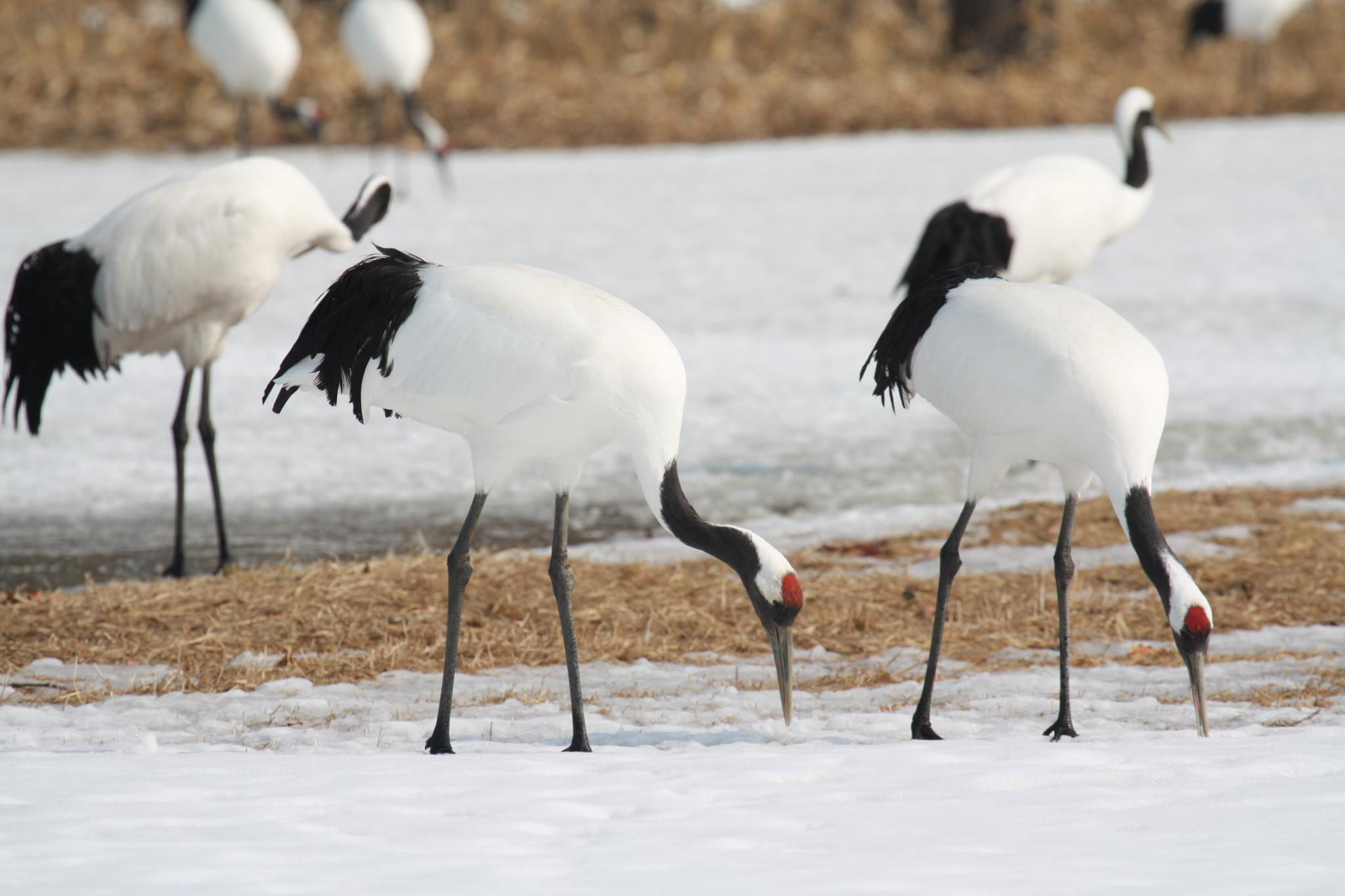
Red crowned crane - Hakdurumi (학두루미)

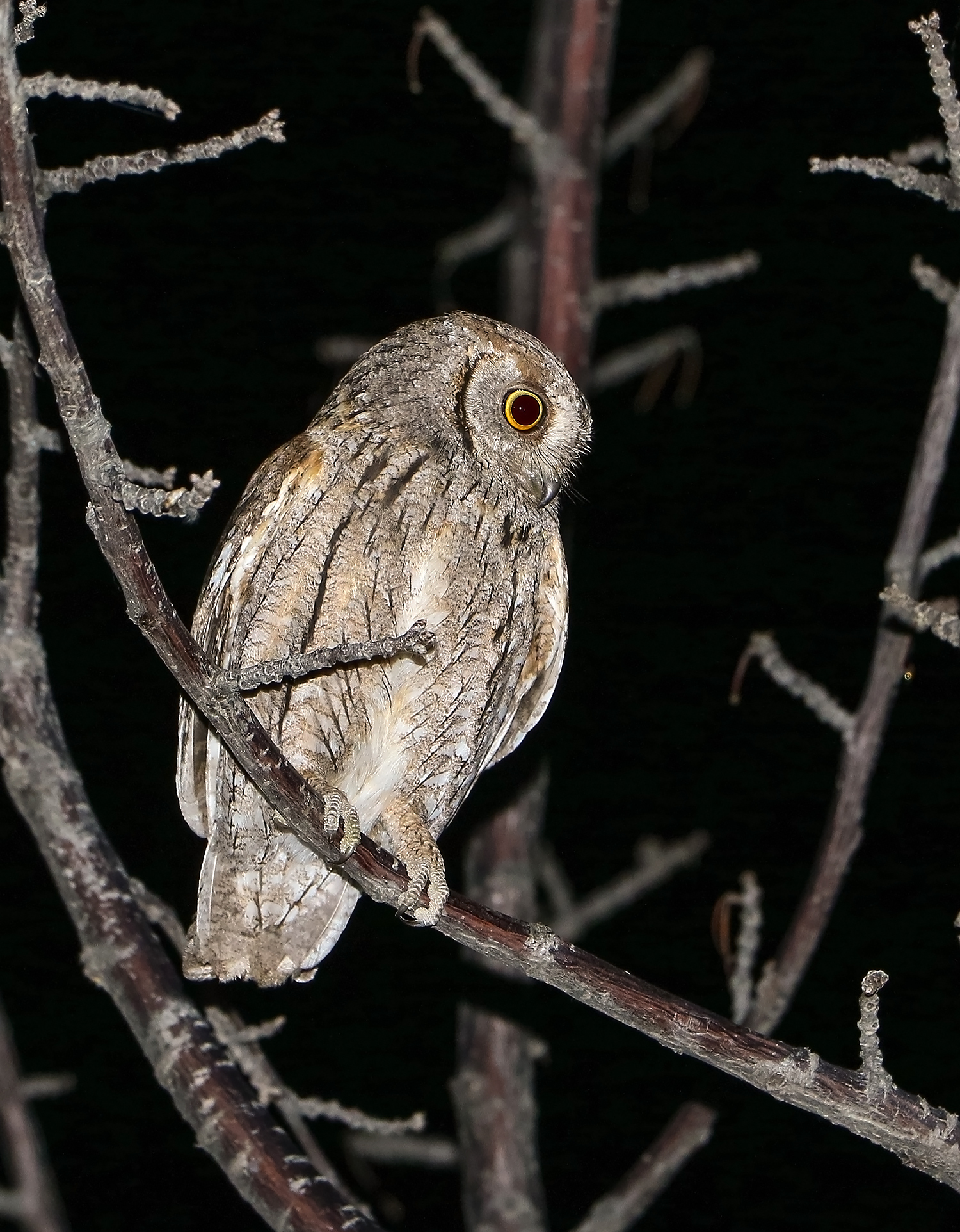
Eurasian Scops owl - Sotaengi (소탱이)

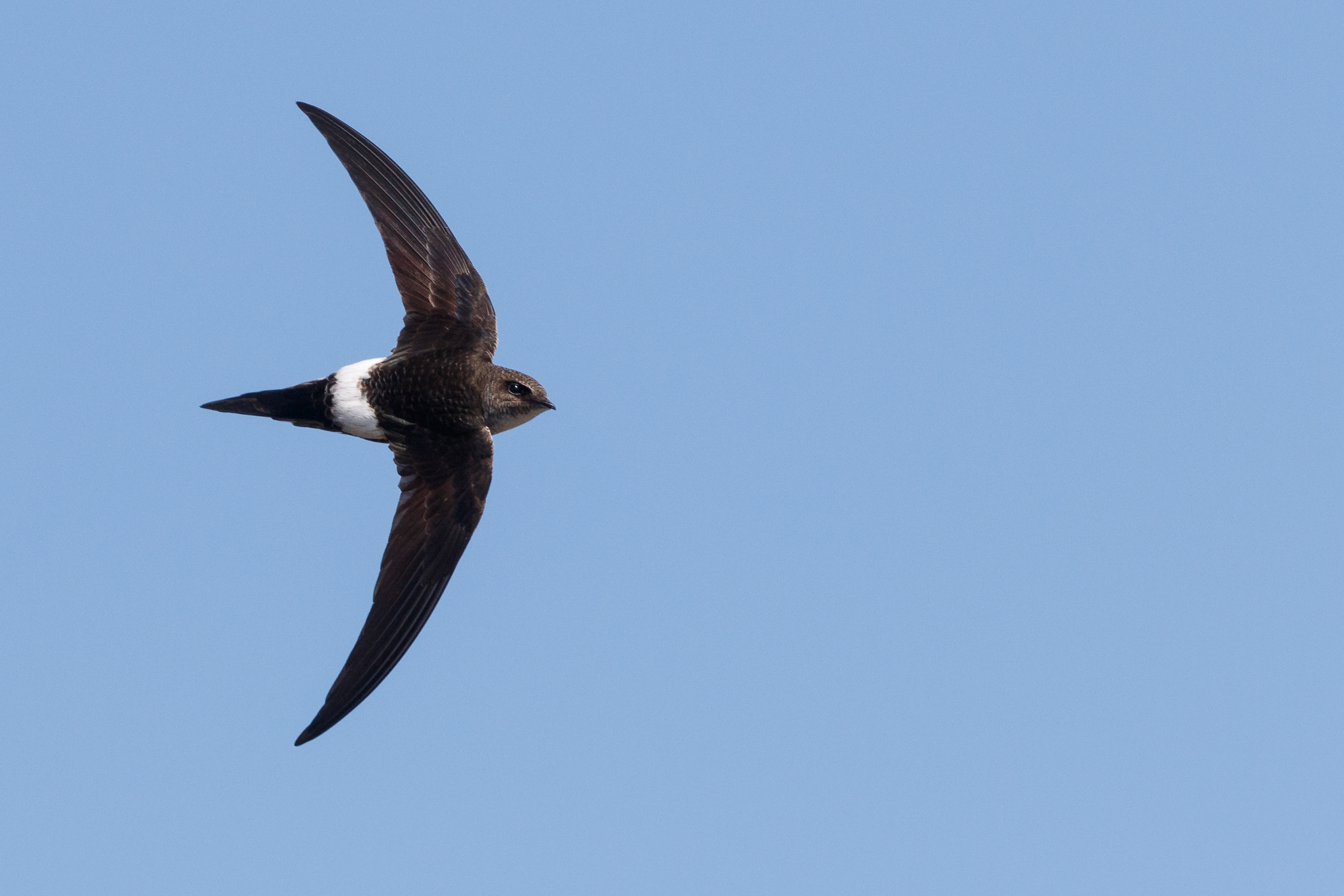
Pacific swift - Aengmaegi (앵미기)

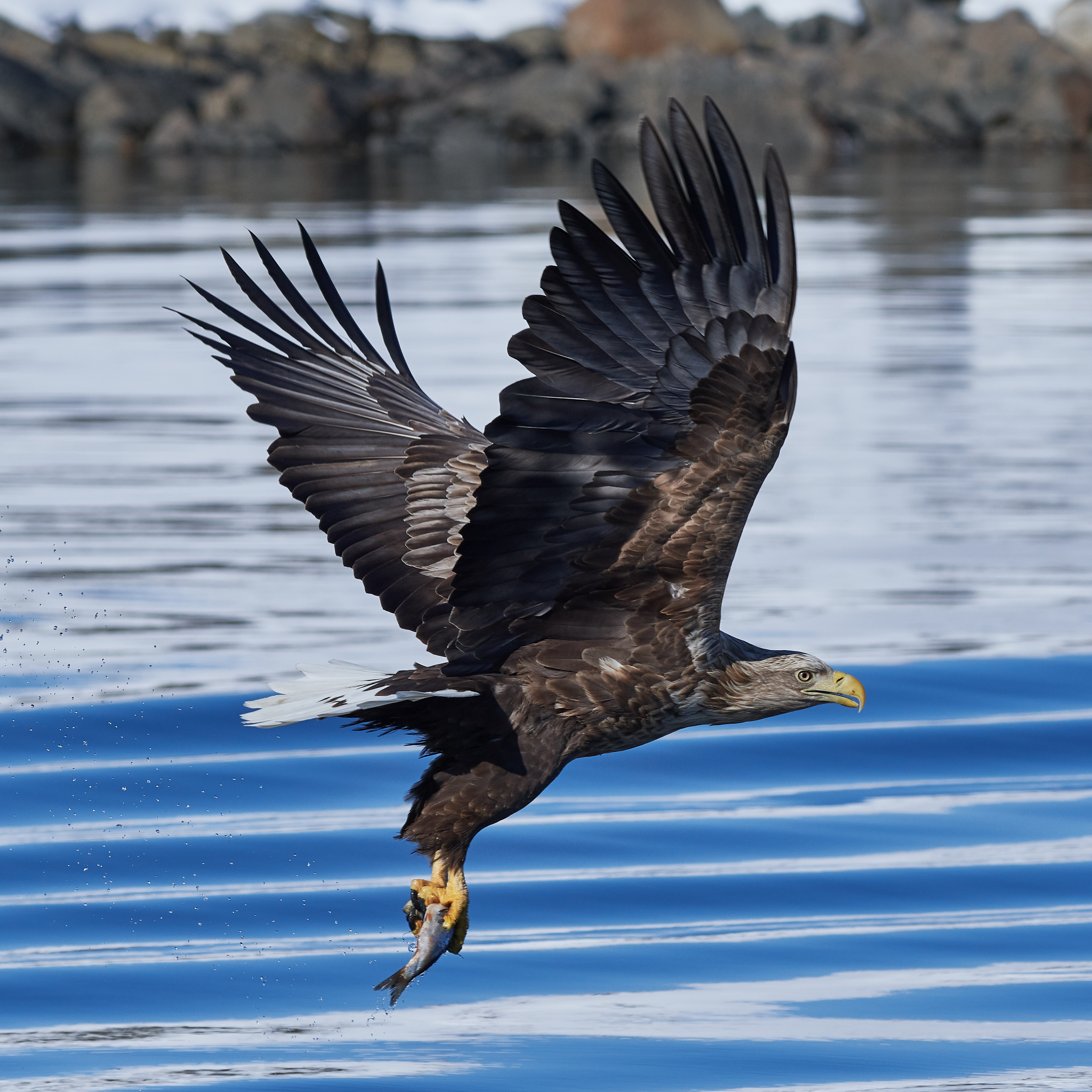
Generic eagle - Daecheon (大天)

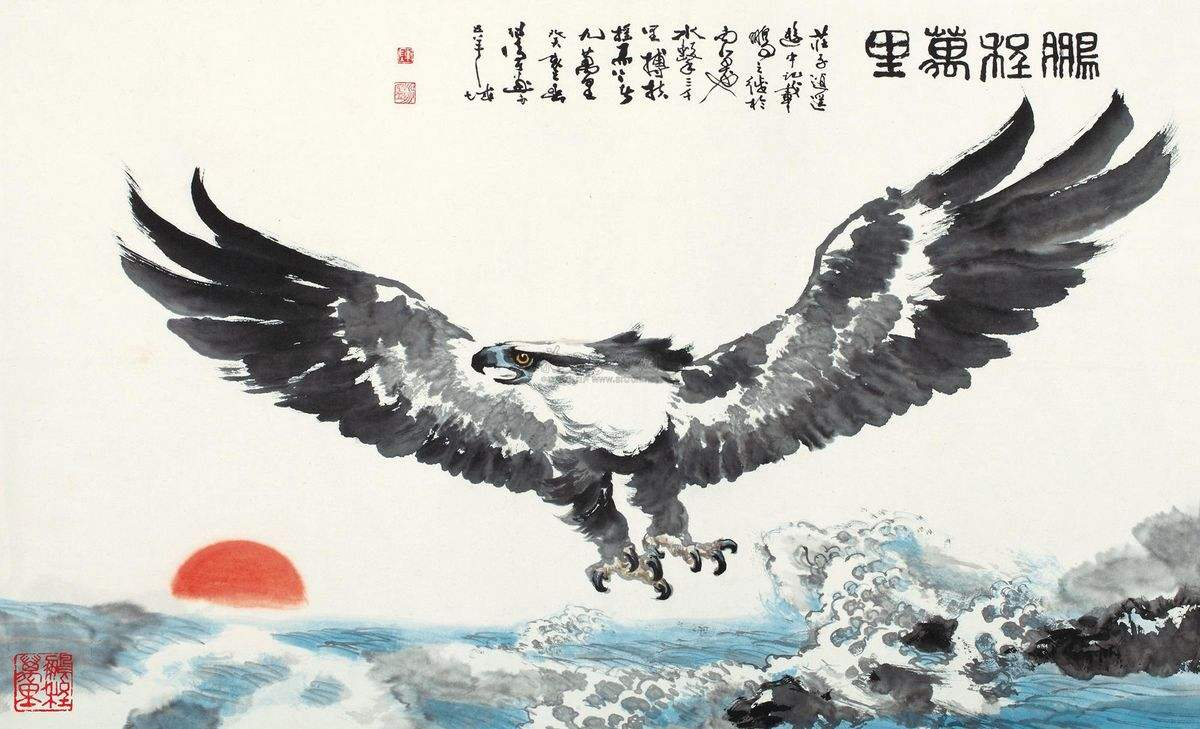
The mythical Peng Bird - Daebung (大鵬)

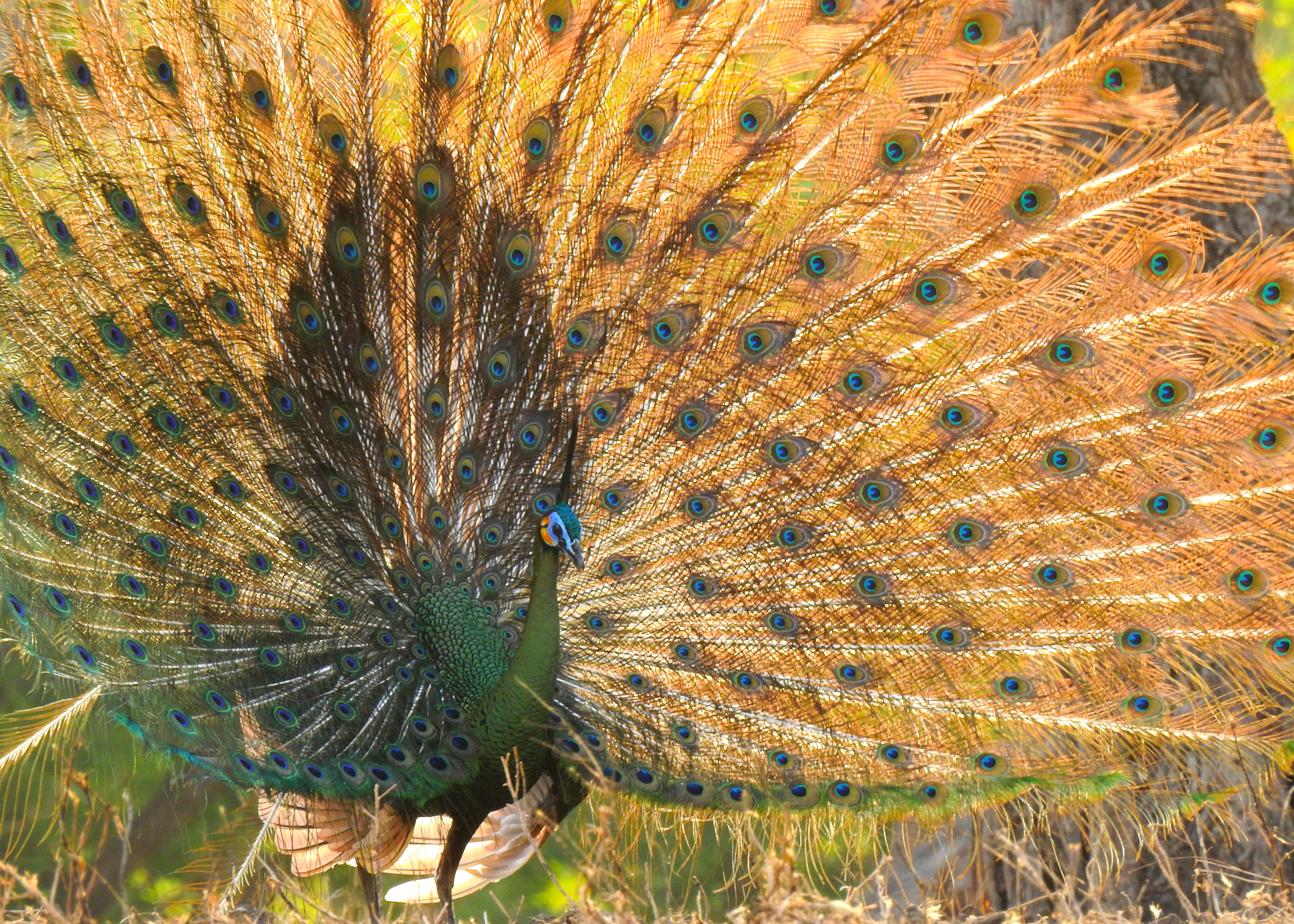
Peacock - Gongjak (孔雀)

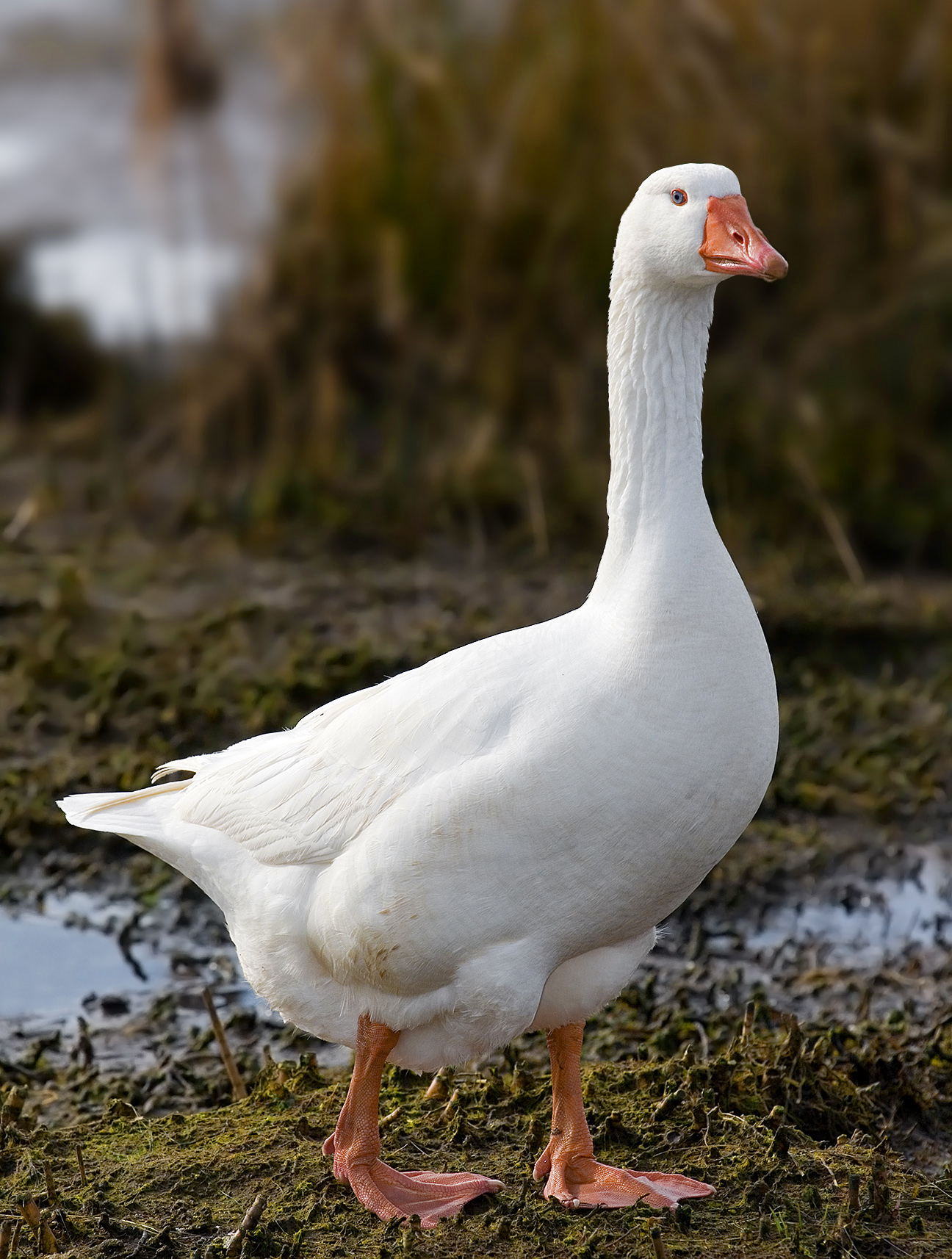
Generic goose - Gireogi (기러기)

== See also ==
- Arirang
- Birds of Korea
- Doraji Taryeong
- Jeokbyeokga
- Monggeumpo Taryeong
- Traditional music of Korea
- Pansori
