= Koigi Landscape Conservation Area =

Protected area in Estonia

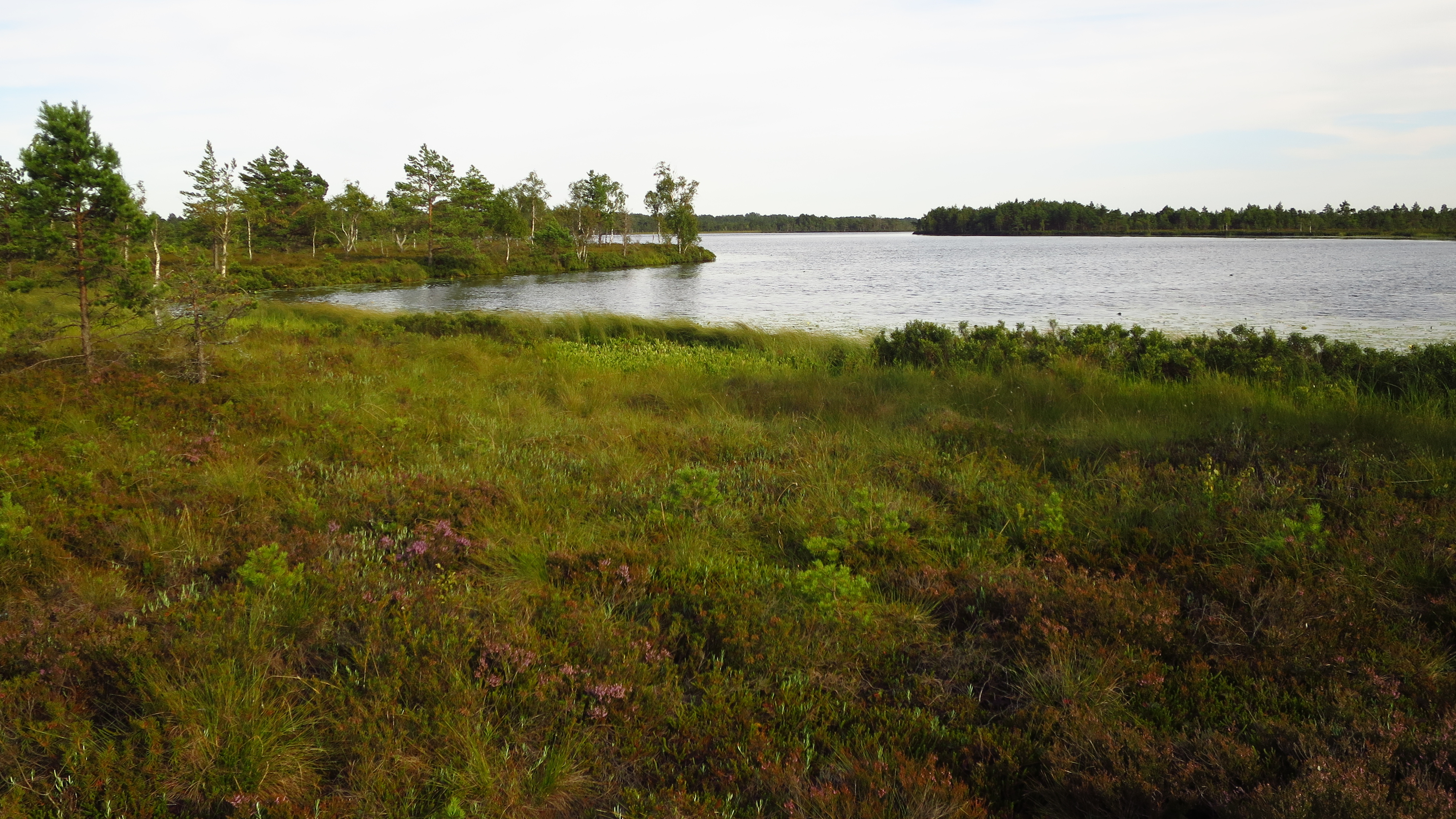

- Location within Estonia
- Location: Estonia
- Coordinates: 58°30′N 22°59′E
- Area: 2,371 ha (5,860 acres)
- Established: 2005

Koigi Landscape Conservation Area is a nature park situated in Saare County, Estonia. Its area is 2371 ha.

== Environment ==
The site was designated in 2005 to protect landscapes and nature of former Pöide, Laimjala and Valjala Parish (nowadays all of them are incorporated into Saaremaa Parish). It has also been designated an Important Bird Area (IBA) by BirdLife International because it supports breeding whooper swans as well as gadwalls on passage.
