= Kushiro River =

River in Hokkaidō, Japan

Kushiro River 釧路川
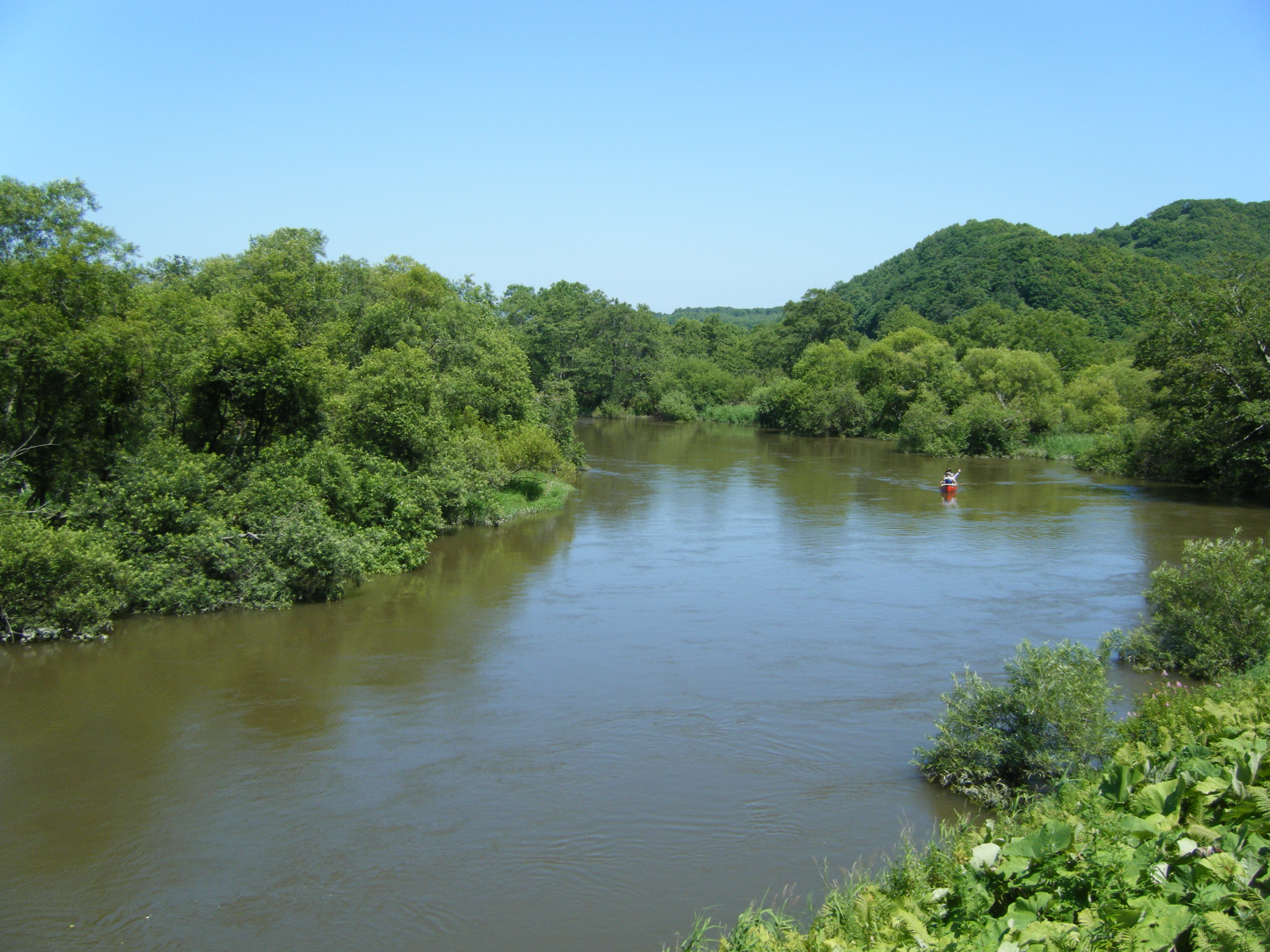
- Kushiro River

- Location within Japan
- Native name: Kushiro-gawa (Japanese)

Location
- Country: Japan
- State: Hokkaidō
- Region: Kushiro
- District: Kamikawa, Kushiro
- Municipalities: Kushiro, Teshikaga

Physical characteristics
- Source: Lake Kussharo
  - location: Teshikaga, Hokkaidō, Japan
  - coordinates: 43°33′35″N 144°20′20″E
  - elevation: 121 m (397 ft)
- Mouth: Pacific Ocean
  - location: Kushiro, Hokkaidō, Japan
  - coordinates: 42°58′46″N 144°22′19″E
  - elevation: 0 m (0 ft)
- Length: 154 km (96 mi)
- Basin size: 2,510 km^{2} (970 sq mi)
- Discharge
  - average: 29.28 m^{3}/s (1,034 cu ft/s)

Kushiro River (釧路川, Kushiro-gawa) is a Class A river in Hokkaidō, Japan. It is 154 kilometers (96 mi) in length and has a drainage area of 2,510 square kilometers (970 sq mi). The Kushiro originates from Lake Kussharo and flows south across the Kushiro Plain. The river is joined by two tributaries, the Kuchoro River (60.2 kilometres (37.4 mi)) and the Setsuri River (59.8 kilometres (37.2 mi)), before it empties into the Pacific Ocean at the port at Kushiro. The lower reaches of the river form broad wetlands. The Shinkushiro River (13 kilometres (8.1 mi)), which was built roughly parallel to the Kushiro River, was completed in 1931 and flows south to the Pacific Ocean.
