= Doraji taryeong =

Korean folk song

- Hangul: 도라지타령
- RR: Doraji taryeong
- MR: Toraji t'aryŏng
- IPA: [to.ɾa.dʑi tʰaː.ɾjʌŋ]

Doraji Taryeong

Doraji taryeong (Korean: 도라지타령) is a Korean folk song which originated in Eunyul, Hwanghae. However, the currently sung version is classified as a folk song from Gyeonggi, as the rhythm and the melody have changed to acquire the characteristics of it.

The song is sung with semachi (fast 6/4 or 9/8) jangdan (rhythmic structure), with occasional switch to jungmori (12/4) jangdan. Like other traditional songs from Korea, it uses the pentatonic scale of jung (G), im (A), mu (C), hwang (D), and tae (E).

Doraji is the Korean name for the plant Platycodon grandiflorus (known as "balloon flower" in English) as well as its root.

Doraji taryeong is one of the most popular folk songs in both North and South Korea, and among Koreans in China. It is also a well known song in Japan, by the name Toraji (Japanese: トラジ).

== Lyrics ==
Korean original (Hangul)

도라지 도라지 도라지
심심산천의 백도라지
한두 뿌리만 캐어도
대바구니로 반실만 되누나

후렴:
에헤요 에헤요 에헤애야
어여라난다 지화자 좋다
저기 저 산 밑에 도라지가 한들한들

도라지 도라지 도라지
은율 금산포 백도라지
한 뿌리 두 뿌리 받으니
산골에 도라지 풍년일세

후렴

도라지 도라지 도라지
강원도 금강산 백도라지
도라지 캐는 아가씨들
손맵시도 멋들어졌네

후렴

Revised Romanization of Korean

Doraji doraji doraji
Simsimsancheonui baekdoraji
Handu ppuriman kaeeodo
Daebaguniro bansilman doenuna

Huryeom:
Eheyo eheyo eheaeya
Eoyeorananda jihwaja jota
Jeogi jeo san mite dorajiga handeulhandeul

Doraji doraji doraji
Eunyul Geumsanpo baekdoraji
Han ppuri du ppuri badeuni
Sangore doraji pungnyeonilse

Huryeom

Doraji doraji doraji
Gangwondo Geumgangsan baekdoraji
Doraji kaeneun agassideul
Sonmaepsido meotdeureojyeonne

Huryeom

English translation

Doraji, doraji, doraji!
In the depths of the mountains is white doraji!
Though one or two roots only I pull,
my bamboo basket grows full.

Refrain:
Eheyo! Eheyo! Eheaeya!
Eoyeorananda! Jihwaja, good!
There at the foot of the mountains, doraji is moving to and fro

Doraji, doraji, doraji!
Eunyul Geumsanpo's white doraji!
A root, two roots that I picked up,
in the mountain valley having bumper doraji crop

Refrain

Doraji, doraji, doraji!
Gangwondo Geumgangsan's white doraji!
Damsels pulling doraji
have such an elegant hand pose.

Refrain
