= Lake Kussharo =

Crater lake in Akan national park

Lake Kussharo 屈斜路湖
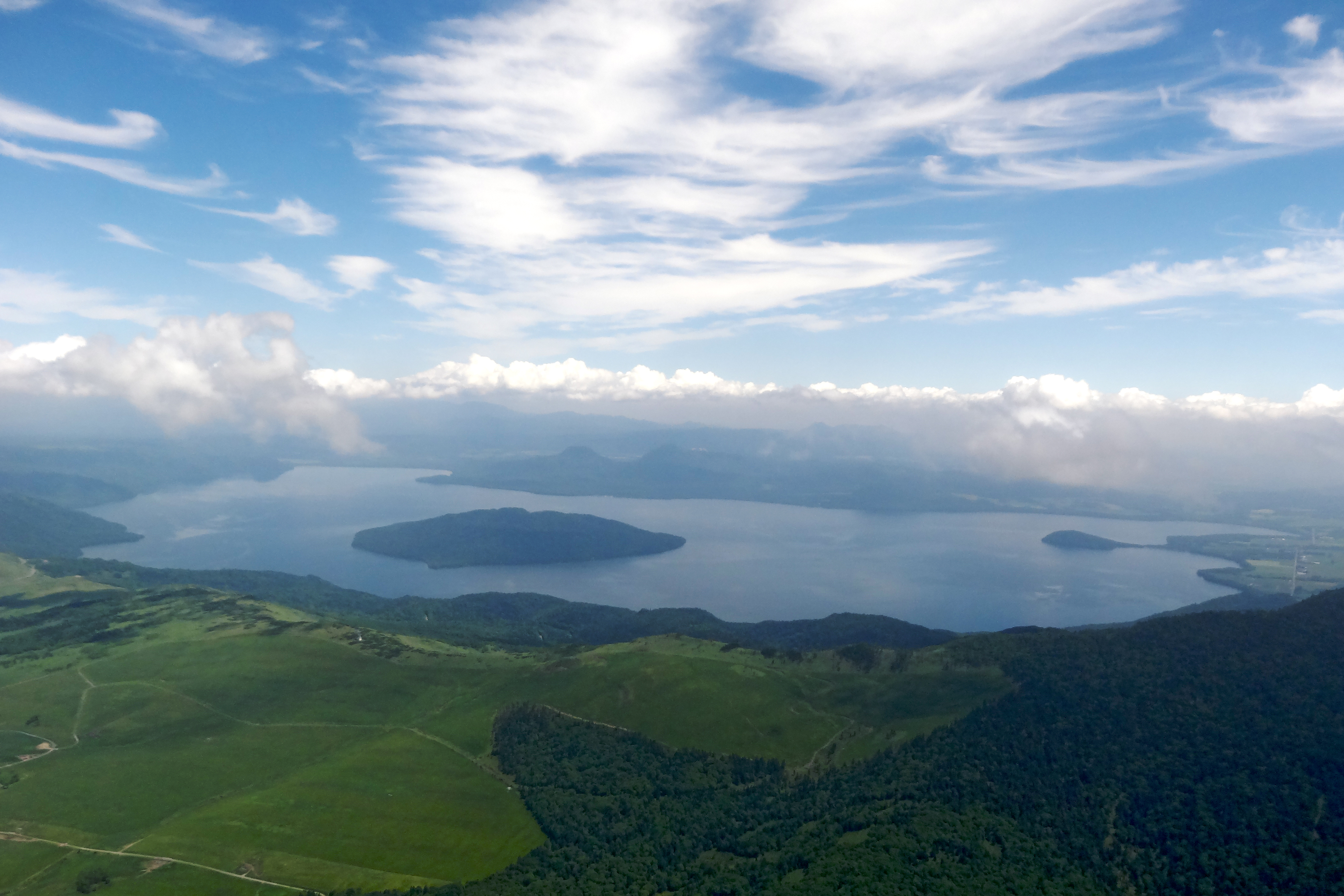
- July 2013

- Location within Hokkaido Location within Japan
- Location: Teshikaga, Hokkaidō
- Coordinates: 43°37′39″N 144°19′46″E
- Type: acidotrophic crater lake
- Primary inflows: Atosa River (跡佐川, Atosa-gawa), Amemasu River, Onnenai River, Shikerepenbetsu River, Onneshireto River, Toikoi River, Meshikimemu River, Enetokomappu River, Ossappe River (尾札部川, Ossappe-gawa)
- Primary outflows: Kushiro River (釧路川, Kushiro-gawa)
- Basin countries: Japan
- Surface area: 79.3 km^{2} (30.6 sq mi)
- Average depth: 28.4 m (93 ft)
- Max. depth: 118 m (387 ft)
- Water volume: 2.25 km^{3} (0.54 cu mi)
- Shore length^{1}: 57 km (35 mi)
- Surface elevation: 121 m (397 ft)
- Islands: Nakajima
- Settlements: Kawayu Onsen and Kotan in Teshikaga
- ^{1} Shore length is not a well-defined measure.

Lake Kussharo (屈斜路湖, Kussharo-ko) is a caldera lake in Akan National Park, eastern Hokkaidō, Japan. As with many geographic names in Hokkaidō, the name derives from the Ainu language. It is the largest caldera lake in Japan in terms of surface area, and the sixth largest lake in Japan. It is also the largest lake in Japan to freeze over completely in winter. The name Lake Kutcharo is also sometimes used.

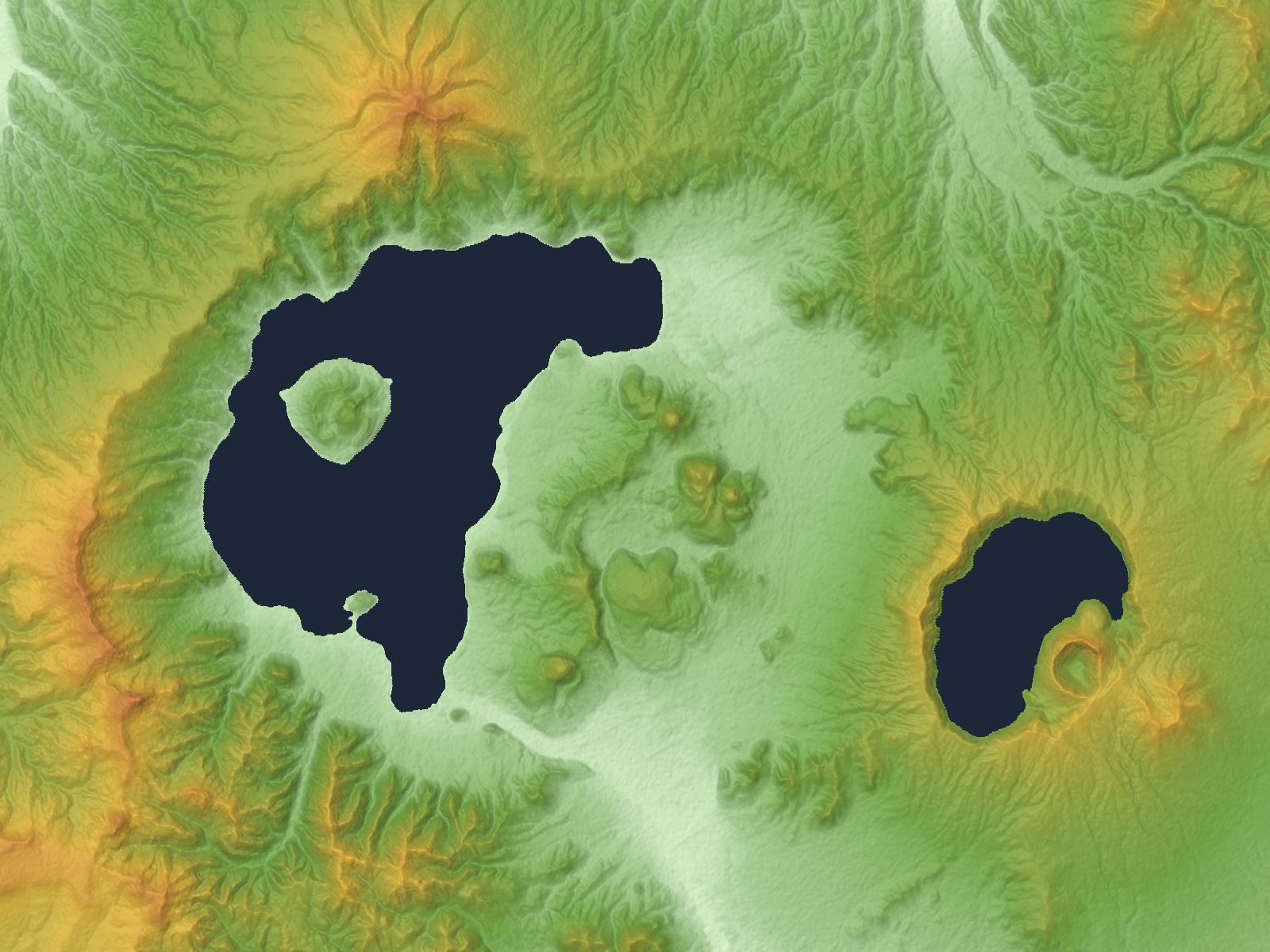
Relief map of Kussharo Caldera (left) & Mashu Caldera (right)

The lake's central island, Nakajima (not to be confused with another island of the same name in Lake Tōya), is a stratovolcano. It is also Japan's largest recursive island. Volcanic gases render the lake water acidic, and it supports few fish, except in areas where inflowing streams dilute the water. Rainbow trout, which are resistant to fairly acidic water, have been artificially introduced.

In 1951, the rare Hyalessa maculaticollis, commonly known as the Minminzemi cicada was discovered, and is now protected by the government. The lake is also on the migratory path of the whooper swan.

Along the lake shore are several outdoor hot springs and a sand beach, with naturally heated sand and hot groundwater.

The lake is also known as "Japan's Loch Ness", after numerous reported sightings on a lake monster, dubbed Kusshii by the press from 1973.

When the layer of ice covering the lake contracts under extreme cold, it reveals water that freezes and fills in with new ice. Later, as daytime temperatures rise, with no room for the ice to expand, the resulting pressure causes ridges to form. This phenomenon can only be seen during the coldest time of winter.

== Wakoto Peninsula ==
Wakoto was originally a volcanic island in the lake, now a peninsula connected to Lake Kussharo's southern shore due to sediment build up. The peninsula has unique characteristics, with its hot springs making it one of the few places to see band-legged ground crickets (Nemobiinae) all year round. Wakoto is the northernmost habitat in Japan of the Minminzemi cicada and their only habitat in eastern Hokkaido.

== Gallery ==
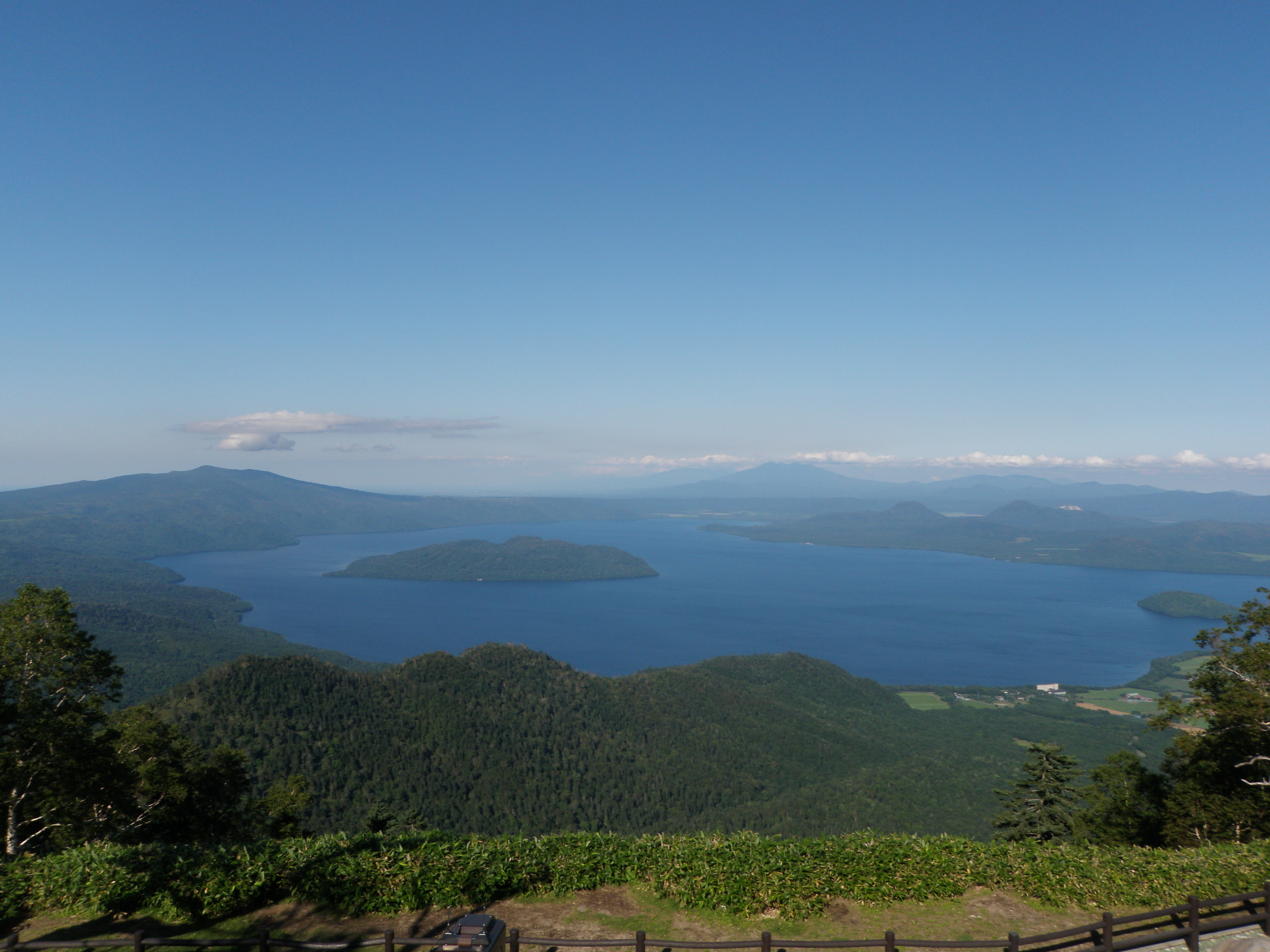
Viewed from Tsubetsu Mountain pass

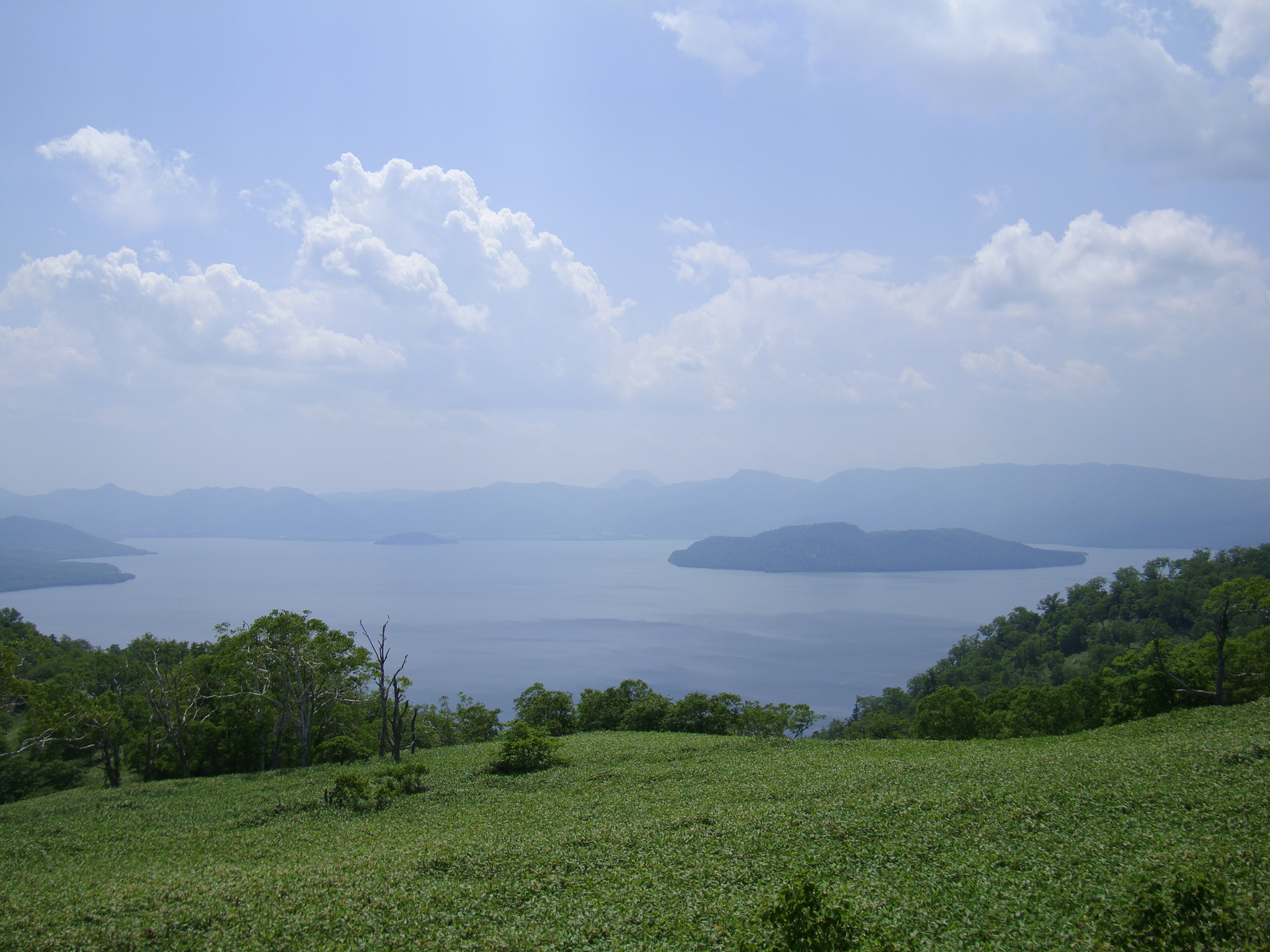
Viewed from Mt. Mokoto Prospects Park

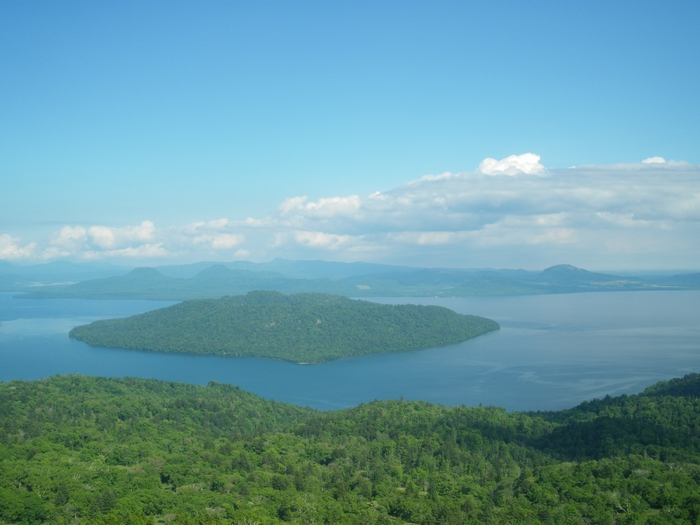
Nakajima island (Lava dome)

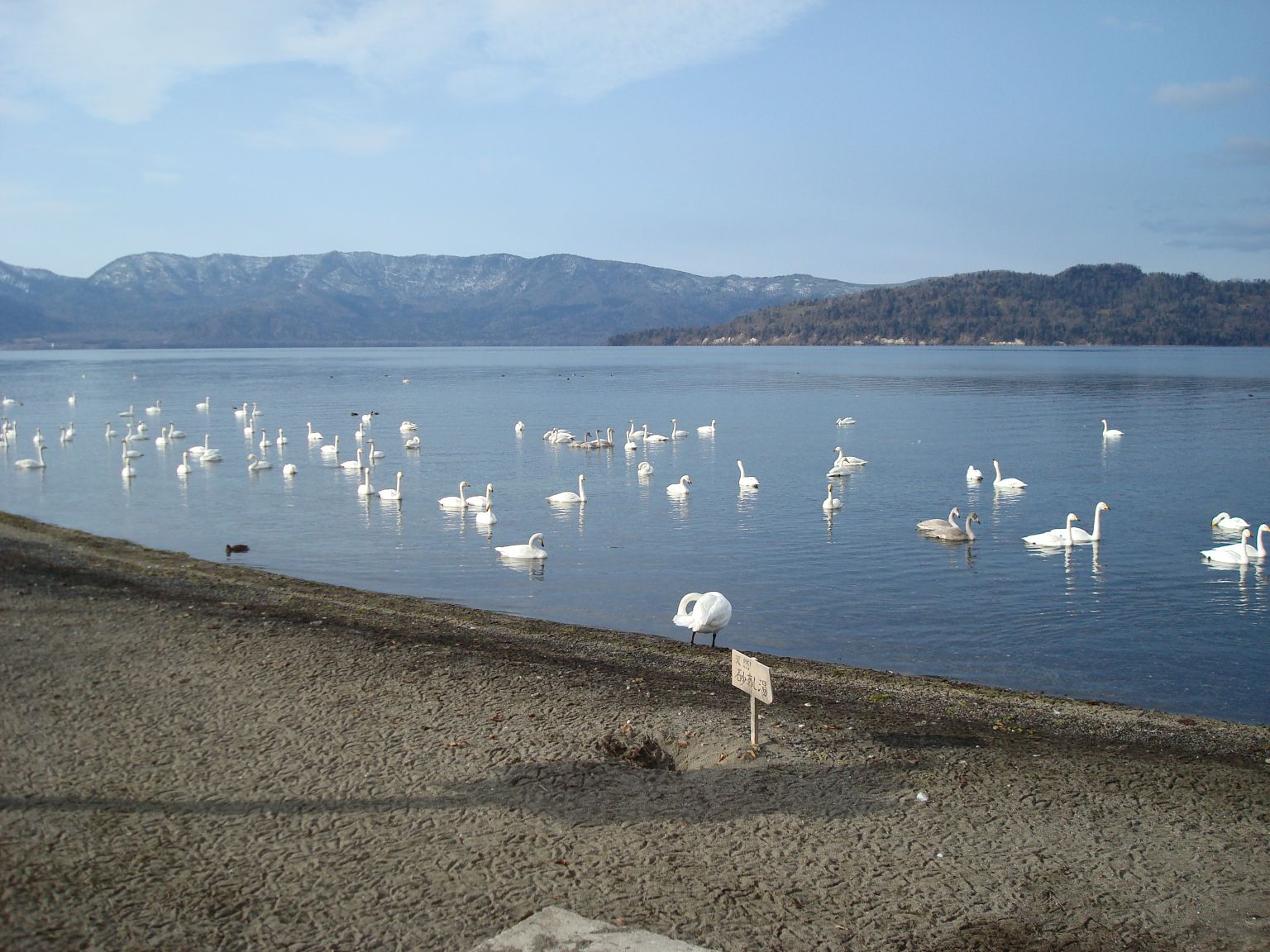
Whooper swans at Lake Kussharo

== See also ==
- Tourism in Japan
