= Unnyul Kumsanpo =

Wetland in North Korea

Coordinates: 38°35′00″N 125°04′00″E

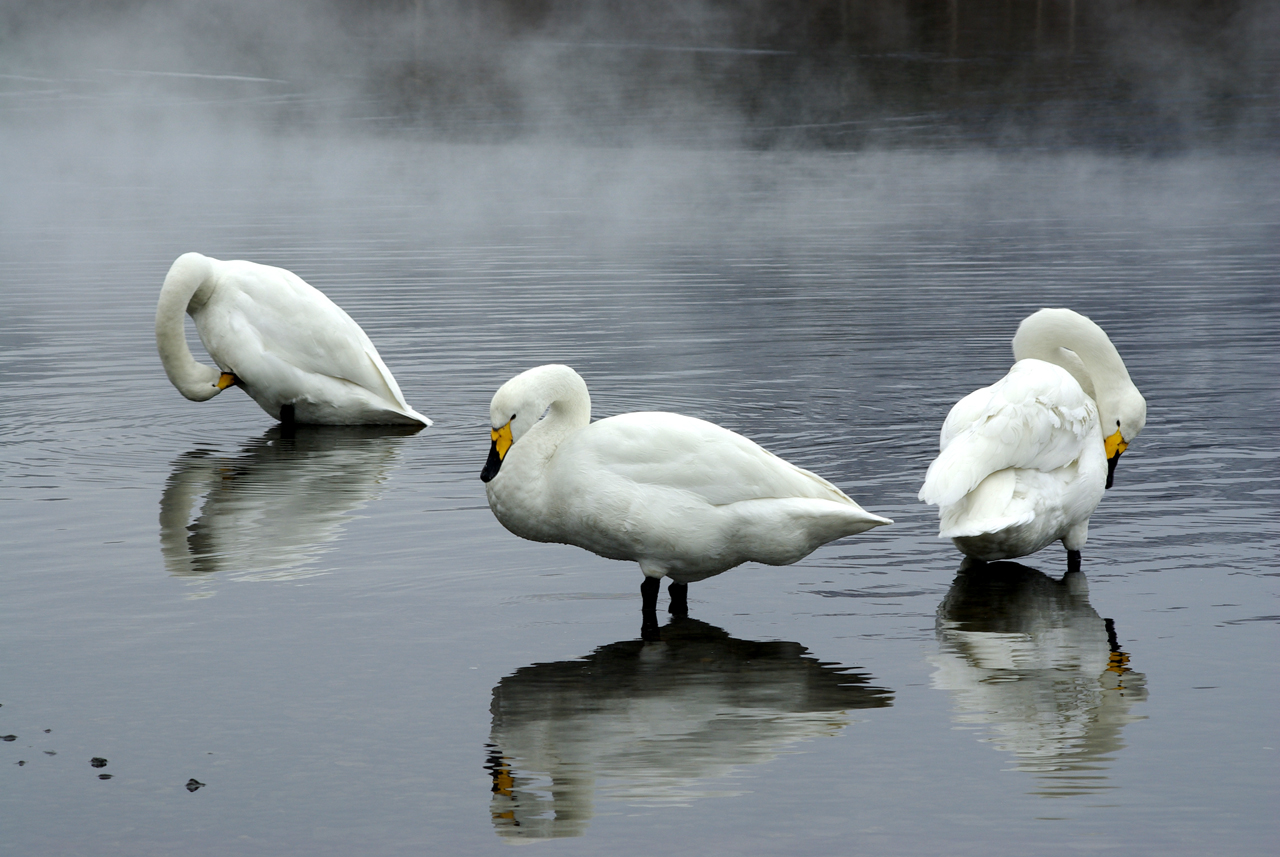
The reserve is important for whooper swans, with up to 750 individuals using it on passage migration

Ŭnryul Kŭmsanpho(은율금산포) is an 800 ha wetland wildlife reserve on the north-eastern shore of the Yellow Sea, on the west coast of North Korea in Ŭllyul County, South Hwanghae Province south of the estuary of the Taedong River. The site forms the core of a 1400 ha Important Bird Area (IBA), identified as such by BirdLife International because, with adjacent rice paddies, it supports populations of migrating and wintering water and wetland birds. Species using the site include swan geese, whooper swans, black-faced spoonbills, Chinese egrets, red-crowned cranes and Nordmann's greenshanks. The IBA is threatened by agricultural intensification.
