= Kussie =

Japanese lake monster

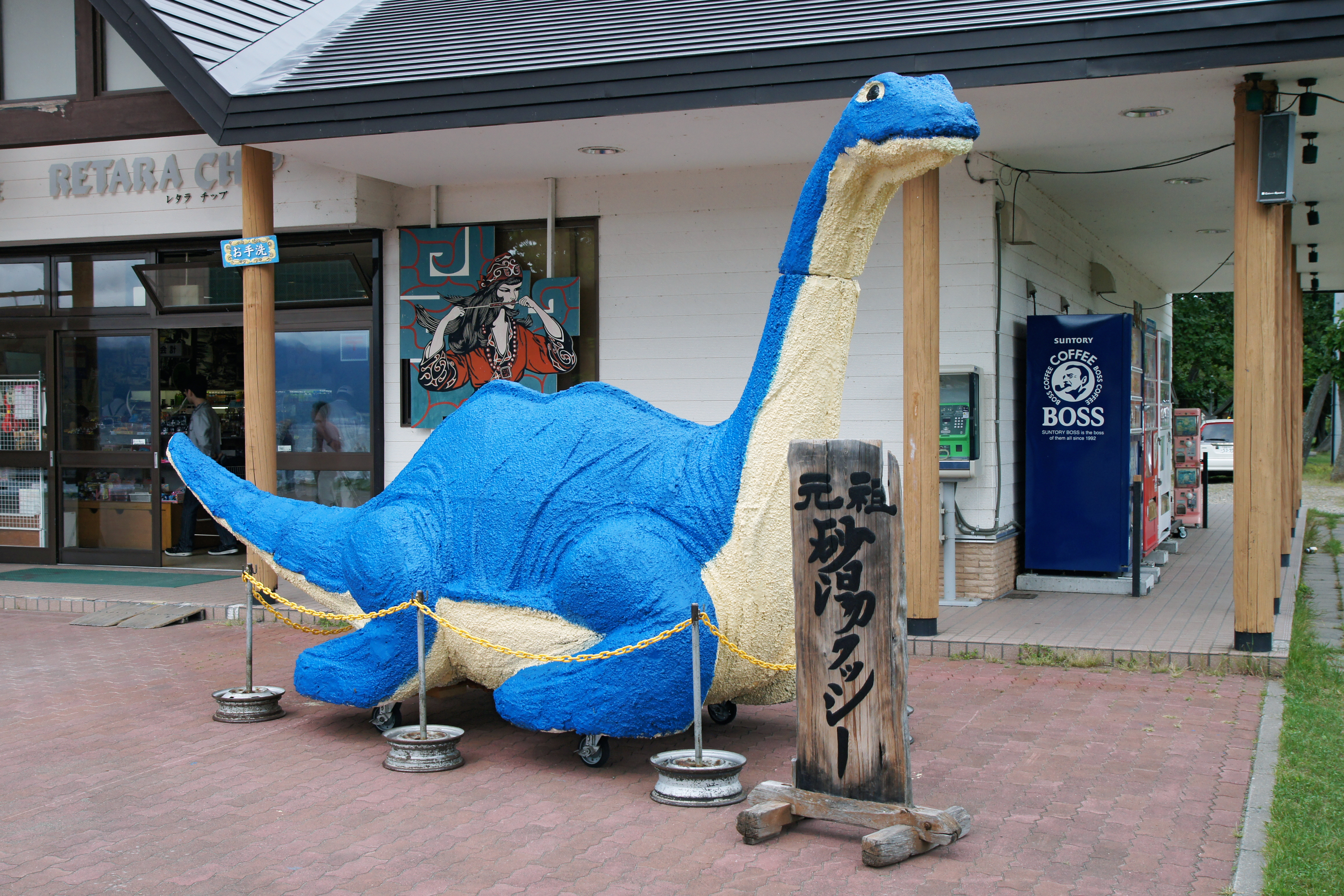
- Statue of Kussie on the shore of Lake Kussharo

Creature information
- Grouping: Legendary creature
- Sub grouping: Lake monster

Origin
- Country: Japan
- Region: Lake Kussharo, Tsubetsu, Hokkaidō
- Details: Found in water

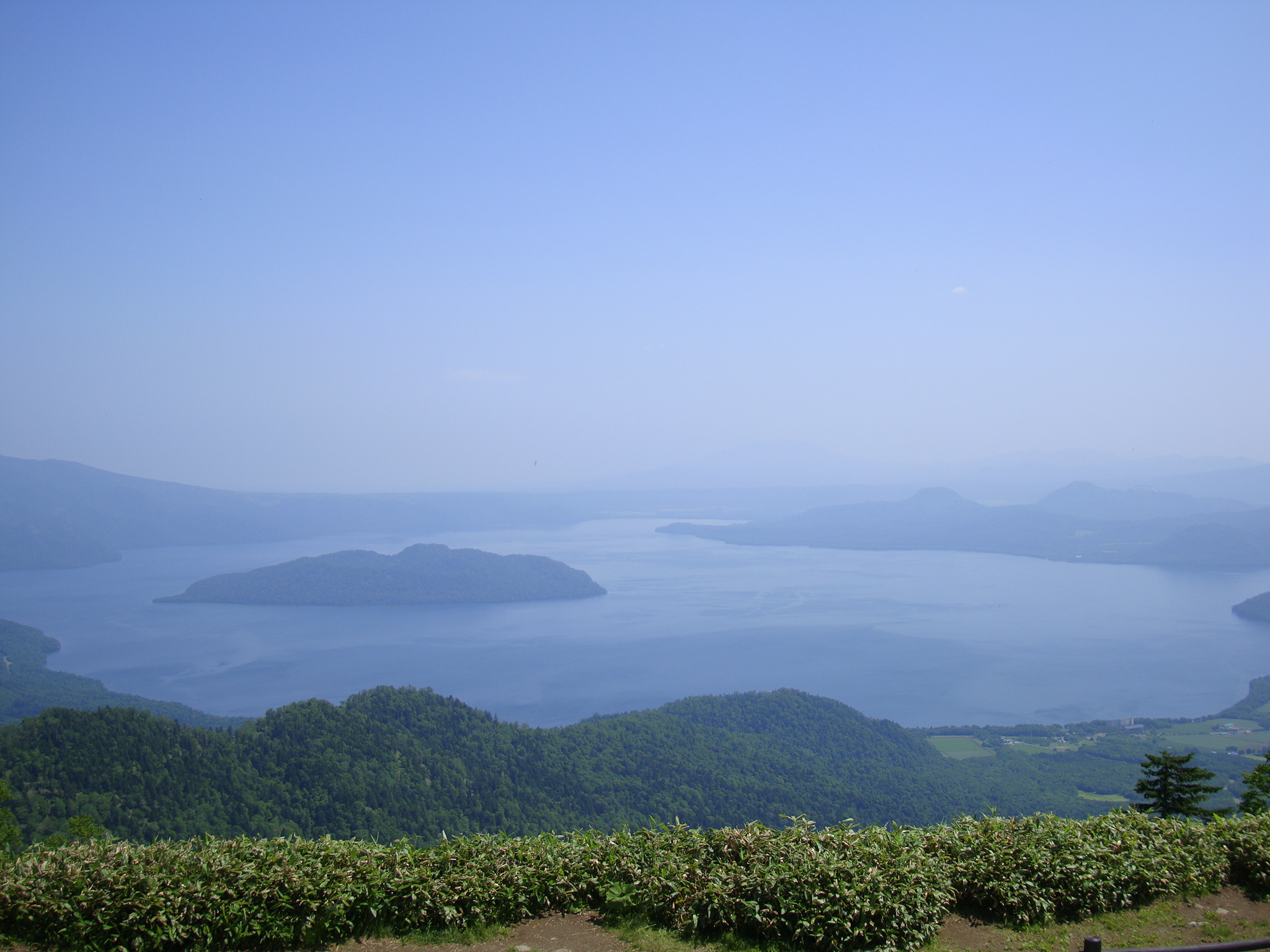
Lake Kussharo from Tsubetsu Mountain pass

Kussie (クッシー, Kusshī) is a Japanese lake monster (a cryptid) said to be living in Hokkaidō's Lake Kussharo on the northern island of Hokkaido. The name "Kussie" is ostensibly inspired by "Nessie", the nickname for the Loch Ness Monster in Scotland.

Lake Kussharo, where Kussie is said to live, is situated within Akan National Park in eastern Hokkaido. The lake is a caldera lake, meaning it was formed in the crater of a volcano. This lake is notable for its connection to Ainu culture, as its name derives from the Ainu word "Kuccharo", which translates to "The place where a lake becomes a river and the river flows out".

A statue of Kussie on the shore of Lake Kussharo signifies the figure's prominence in local culture. Similar to other lake monster tales around the world, stories about Kussie contribute to local folklore and attract curiosity and tourism to the area.

== See also ==
- Issie
