= Unnyul County =

Ŭnryul County 은률군
- County

North Korean transcription(s)
  - Chosŏn'gŭl: 은률군
  - Hancha: 殷栗郡
  - McCune–Reischauer: Ŭnnyul-gun

South Korean transcription(s)
  - Hangeul: 은율군
  - Revised Romanization: Eunyul-gun
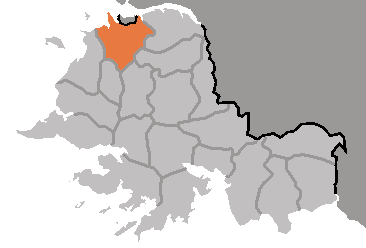
- Country: North Korea
- Province: South Hwanghae Province

Area
  - Total: 418.2 km^{2} (161.5 sq mi)

Population (2008)
  - Total: 107,997
  - Density: 258.2/km^{2} (668.8/sq mi)

Ŭnryul County (은률군) is a county in South Hwanghae province, North Korea. The county is called by the name Eunyul (은율) in South Korea, due to the pronunciation differences between Northern and Southern Korean dialects.

== History ==
Neolithic artefacts were found in the region then known as Gunryanggol village located in the subdivision called Changam-ri Nambumyeon (now forming part of Sandong-ri). Bronze age Dolmen were found in different parts of the County, and many bronze age artifacts and Chinese knife money during the Han dynasty were found in the region in the mud tombs. Different artefacts from the Iron Age were also found in Unsŏng-ri. Archaeological findings related to the Lelang confederacy have also been found. During the kingdom of Goguryeo, it was called Yulgu or Yulcheon. In 757, when it was under the kingdom of Silla, the region was an associated region under the control of Yangak County. After the founding of the Goryeo Kingdom, the region was known as the Unyul prefecture, which was divided into three regions (a sub-county that was under pungju, Jamgmyeongjin area under Hwangju, and the Yeonpungjang area which was owned by the Goryeo royals). In 1269, due to the control of Goryeo by the Yuan Dynasty, it was confiscated and put under the control of Dongnyeong Prefectures but soon returned to the control of the kingdom of Goryeo in 1278. During the Joseon era, it went under the control of Pungchon County in 1414, but it soon returned to Unyul County. In 1919 it became a centre for mass protests. In 1954, it began to be a county under South Hwanghae Province.

== Administrative divisions ==
Unryul county is divided into 1 ŭp (town), 1 rodongjagu (workers' district) and 21 ri (villages):

- Ŭnryul-ŭp
- Kŭmsanpho-rodongjagu
- Jangryŏl-li
- Chŏlsal-li
- Idopho-ri
- Kachŏl-li
- Kimchŏl-li
- Kŭmbong-ri
- Kuwŏl-li
- Kwanhae-ri
- Kwansal-li
- Rakchŏl-li
- Ryul-li
- Sandong-ri
- Sang-ri
- Sansŭng-ri
- Sŏgong-ri
- Sŏhae-ri
- Taechu-ri
- Ŭnhye-ri
- Unsŏng-ri
- Wŏnphyŏng-ri
- Yŏnam-ri

== Transportation ==
Ŭnryul county is served by the Ŭnnyul Line of the Korean State Railway.

== Mining ==
The Ŭnryul iron mine, located north of Ŭnryul-ŭp, is one of North Korea's leading sources of iron ore. A 4.6-kilometre (2.9 mi) belt conveyor, built in 1975, carries waste rock from the mine to the coast. The rock has been used to build dikes between offshore islets and reclaim shallow bays for farming, fishing and salt evaporation.

== Features ==
Namsan (Korean: 남산; Hanja: 南山; lit. 'South Mountain') is a 148-metre peak in Ŭnryul.

== See also ==
- Kuwŏlsan
- Kŭmsanpho
- Kŭmsanpho peninsula
- Ŭnryul talchum
