= Setsuri River =

River in Hokkaidō, Japan

Setsuri River is a river in Hokkaido, Japan. It joins the Kushiro River. It is the winter habitat of the Japanese crane.
