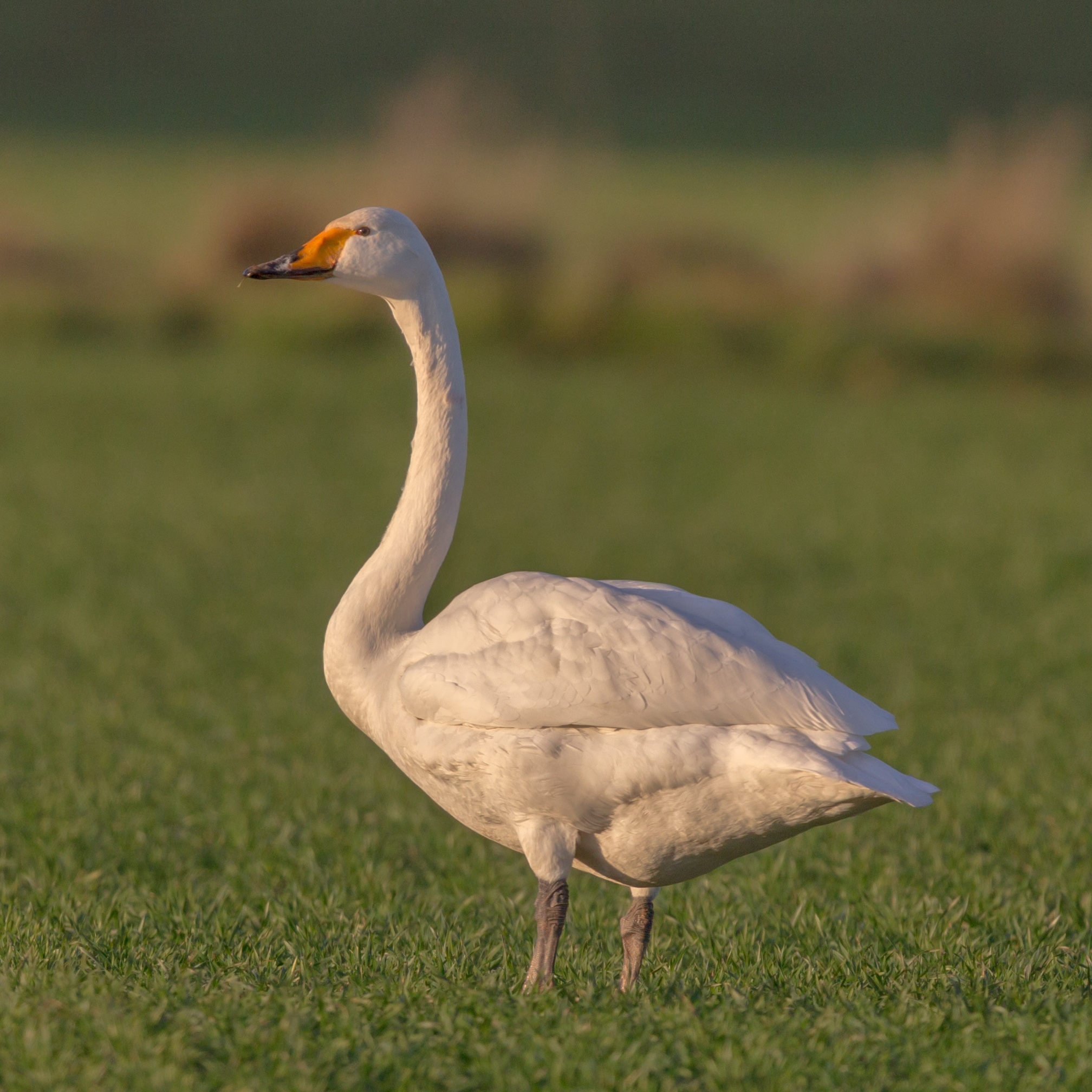

Conservation status
- Least Concern (IUCN 3.1)

Scientific classification
- Kingdom: Animalia
- Phylum: Chordata
- Class: Aves
- Order: Anseriformes
- Family: Anatidae
- Genus: Cygnus
- Species: C. cygnus

Binomial name
- Cygnus cygnus (Linnaeus, 1758)
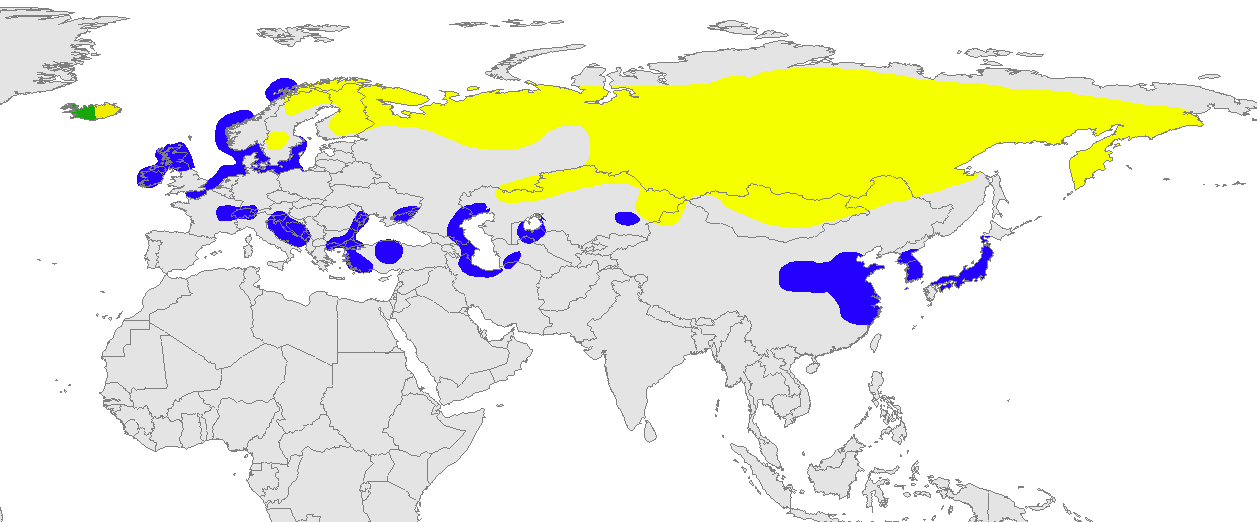
- Range of C. cygnus Breeding range Year-round range Wintering range

Synonyms
- Anas cygnus Linnaeus, 1758; Cygnus ferus

Audio
- Calls recorded in County Cork, Ireland

= Whooper swan =

Species of bird

The whooper swan (/ˈhuːpə(ɹ) swɒn/ "hooper swan"; Cygnus cygnus), is a large northern hemisphere swan. It is the Eurasian counterpart of the North American trumpeter swan.

== Taxonomy ==
Francis Willughby and John Ray's Ornithology of 1676 referred to this swan as "the Elk, Hooper, or wild Swan". It was one of the many bird species originally described by Carl Linnaeus in the 1758 10th edition of his Systema Naturae, where it was given the binomial name of Anas cygnus. The species name is from cygnus, the Latin for "swan", and the type species for the genus Cygnus. This swan is monotypic with no subspecies.

The old name 'elk', which is not related to the deer species of the same name, derives from Old Norse elft, and also survives in modern Icelandic name for the species álft; it is cognate with the Latin albus, 'white'.

== Description ==
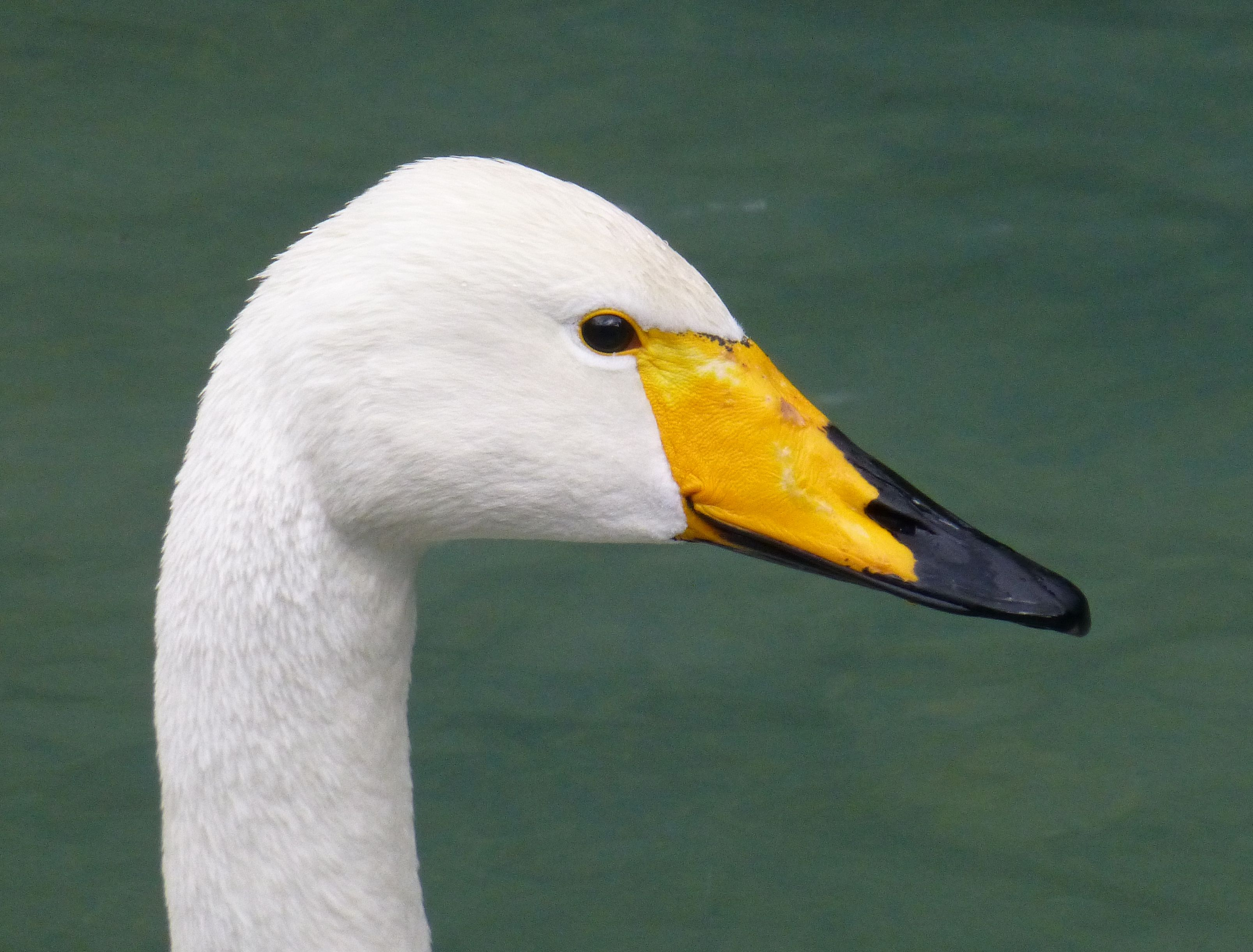
Head detail

The whooper swan is similar in appearance to Bewick's swan. It is larger, however, at a length of 140–165 centimetres (55–65 inches) and a wingspan of 205–275 cm (81–108 in), similar in size to the mute swan. The weight is typically in the range of 7.4–14.0 kilograms (16 1/4–30 3/4 pounds), with an average of 9.8–11.4 kg (21 1/2–25 1/4 lb) for males and 8.2–9.2 kg (18–20 1/4 lb) for females. The verified record mass was 15.5 kg (34 1/4 lb) for a wintering male from Denmark. It is considered to be amongst the heaviest flying birds. Among standard measurements, the wing chord is 56.2–63.5 cm (22 1/8–25 in), the tarsus is 10.4–13.0 cm (4 3/32–5 1/8 in) and the bill is 9.2–11.6 cm (3.6–4.6 in). It has a more angular head shape, and a bill pattern that always shows more yellow than black (Bewick's swans have more black than yellow). Like their close relatives, whooper swans are vocal birds with a call similar to the trumpeter swan. The adults are pure white, but the head and neck are often stained rusty-yellow when feeding in water rich in tannins or iron compounds. Juveniles, up to about a year old, are uniform pale grey to greyish-brown, with the same bill pattern as adults but with the yellow replaced by pink, and the black replaced by blackish-grey; they differ from mute swans in being paler and more uniform, lacking the mute swan juvenile's brown-and-white pattern. All ages can also be told from mute swans by their shorter, rounded tail, unlike the longer, triangular-pointed tail of mute swans (a useful distinction when birds are feeding with their heads underwater).

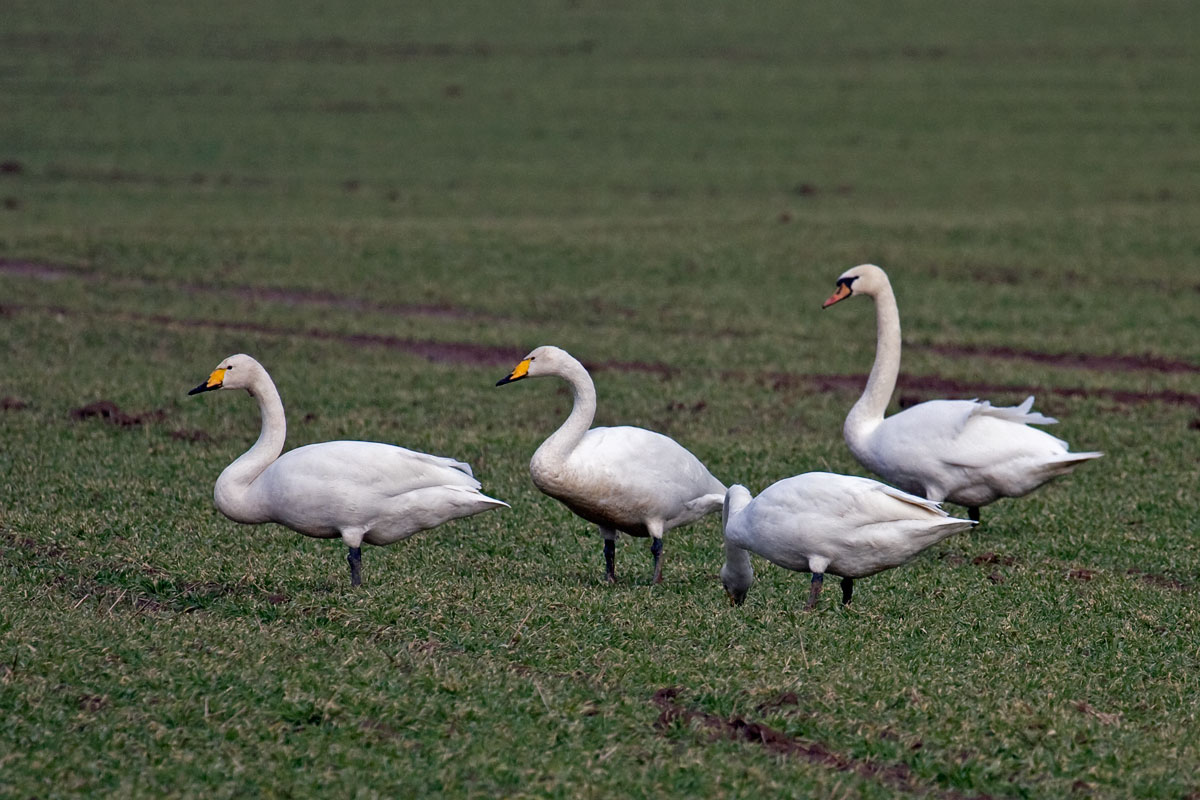
Three whooper swans and one mute swan

== Distribution and habitat ==
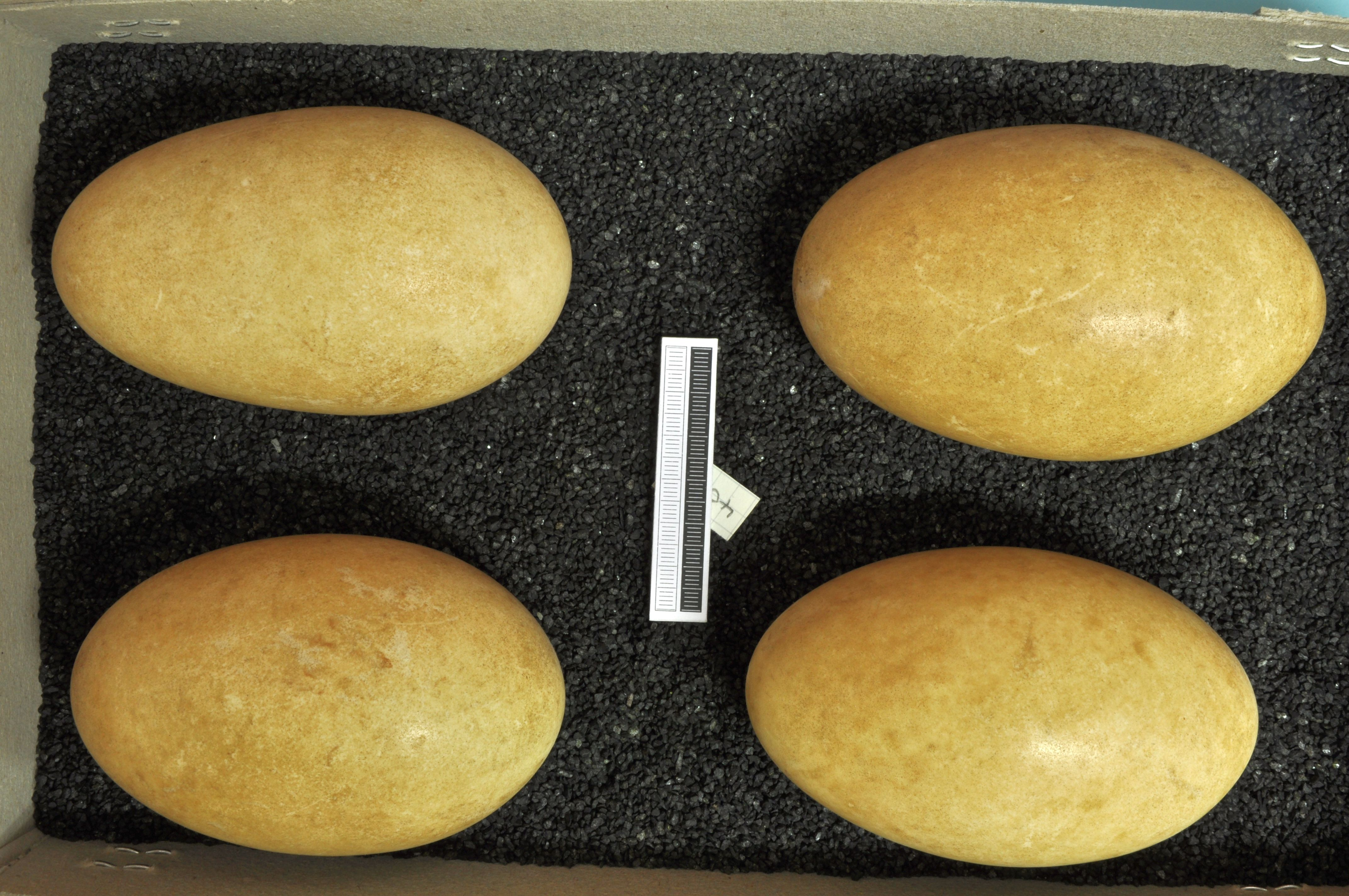
Eggs, Collection Museum Wiesbaden

Whooper swans have a deep honking call that resembles geese and, despite their size, are powerful fliers. Whooper swans can migrate hundreds or even thousands of miles to their wintering sites in southern Europe and eastern Asia. They breed in the subarctic Eurosiberia, further south than Bewicks in the taiga zone. They are rare breeders in northern Scotland, particularly in Orkney, and no more than five pairs have bred there in recent years; a handful of pairs have also bred in Ireland in recent years. This bird is an occasional vagrant to the Indian subcontinent and western North America. Icelandic breeders overwinter in the United Kingdom and Ireland, especially in the wildfowl nature reserves of the Royal Society for the Protection of Birds and the Wildfowl and Wetlands Trust.

== Behaviour ==
=== Migration ===
The whooper swan is a long distance migrant, and usually flies at an altitude of 50–200 m (160–660 ft) at speeds of up to 100 km/h (62 mph), but sometimes considerably higher. A notable case involved a flock of about 30 migrating from Iceland to Ireland on 9 December 1967, detected by air traffic control radar (and checked by a diverted commercial flight) west of Scotland in the lower stratosphere at 8,200 m (27,000 ft) altitude (the highest recorded altitude for any bird over Britain). An analysis of the weather at the time concluded the birds were making use of a 50 m/s (180 km/h; 100 kn) northerly jet stream wind to cut their flying time on migration for the 1,100 km Iceland to Ireland journey to about 7 hours. In doing so, they had to tolerate the ambient temperature of -48°C, and air pressure only one third of surface pressure. Many will stop at sites during migration.

=== Breeding ===
Whooper swans pair for life. Nests are built in or near water in dense cover. The nest is mostly constructed by the female from surrounding vegetation. The female will usually lay 2–7 eggs (exceptionally 12). The eggs average 11.3 cm (4.4 in) in length and 7.3 cm (2.9 in) in width, and typically weigh 301–340 g (10.6–12.0 oz). Incubation averages 35 days. The female incubates the eggs and the male is normally nearby guarding the nest and territory. At five days old, cygnets begin to grow rapidly, reaching 550–600 g (1.21–1.32 lb) by day 12 and 3.1–3.7 kg (6.8–8.2 lb) at 40 to 45 days in age. In China and Russia, fledging occurs 90–105 days after hatching, at a mass of 6.5–7 kg (14–15 lb). In Finland, fledging occurs at 78–96 days.

=== Communication ===
When whooper swans prepare to go on a flight as a flock, they use a variety of signaling movements to communicate with each other. These movements include head bobs, head shakes, and wing flaps and influence whether the flock will take flight and if so, which individual will take the lead. Whooper swans that signaled with these movements in large groups were found to be able to convince their flock to follow them 61% of the time. In comparison, swans that did not signal were only able to create a following 35% of the time. In most cases, the whooper swan in the flock that makes the most movements (head bobs) is also the swan that initiates the flight of the flock – this initiator swan can be either male or female, but is more likely to be a parent than a cygnet. Additionally, this signaling method may be a way for paired mates to stay together in flight. Observational evidence indicates that a swan whose mate is paying attention to and participates in its partner's signals will be more likely to follow through with the flight. Thus, if a whooper swan begins initiating flight signals, it will be less likely to actually carry through with the flight if its mate is not paying attention and is therefore less likely to join it.

They are very noisy; the calls are strident, similar to those of Bewick's swan but more resonant and lower-pitched on average: kloo-kloo-kloo in groups of three or four.

== Lifespan and Mortality ==
Whooper swans typically live for 10–15 years, the maximum recorded age was a bird in captivity which lived in excess of 25 years. Avian influenza can have outbreaks in the species leading to mass mortality; a significant outbreak in October-November 2025 killed 200 on the Ouse Washes in England. Power lines and lead poisoning are significant causes of death. In northern Russia, the main threats of natural predation are from the red fox, white-tailed eagle, and golden eagle.

== Influence ==
Whooper swans are much admired in Europe. The whooper swan has been the national bird of Finland since 1981 and is featured on the Finnish 1 euro coin. The whooper swan is one of the species to which the Agreement on the Conservation of African-Eurasian Migratory Waterbirds (AEWA) applies. Musical utterances by whooper swans at the moment of death have been suggested as the origin of the swan song legend. The global spread of H5N1 reached the UK in April 2006 in the form of a dead whooper swan found in Scotland.

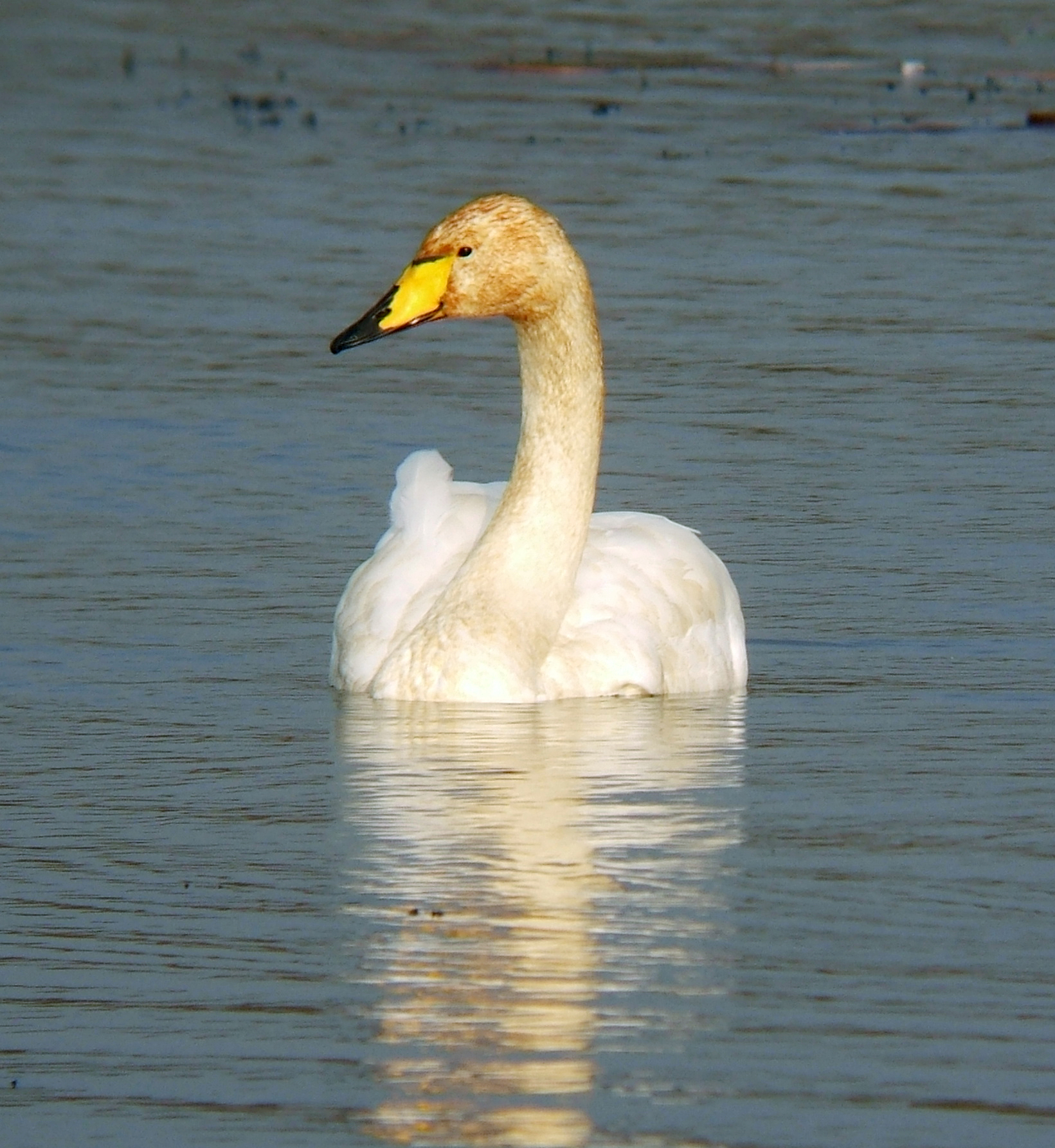
Whooper swan in Northumberland, with rust-stained head

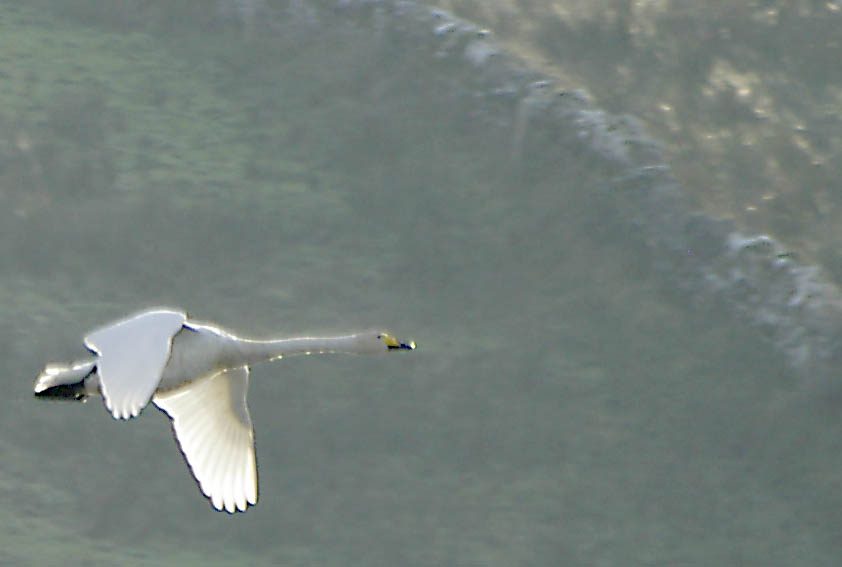
Whooper swans near Kilfenora, County Clare, Ireland

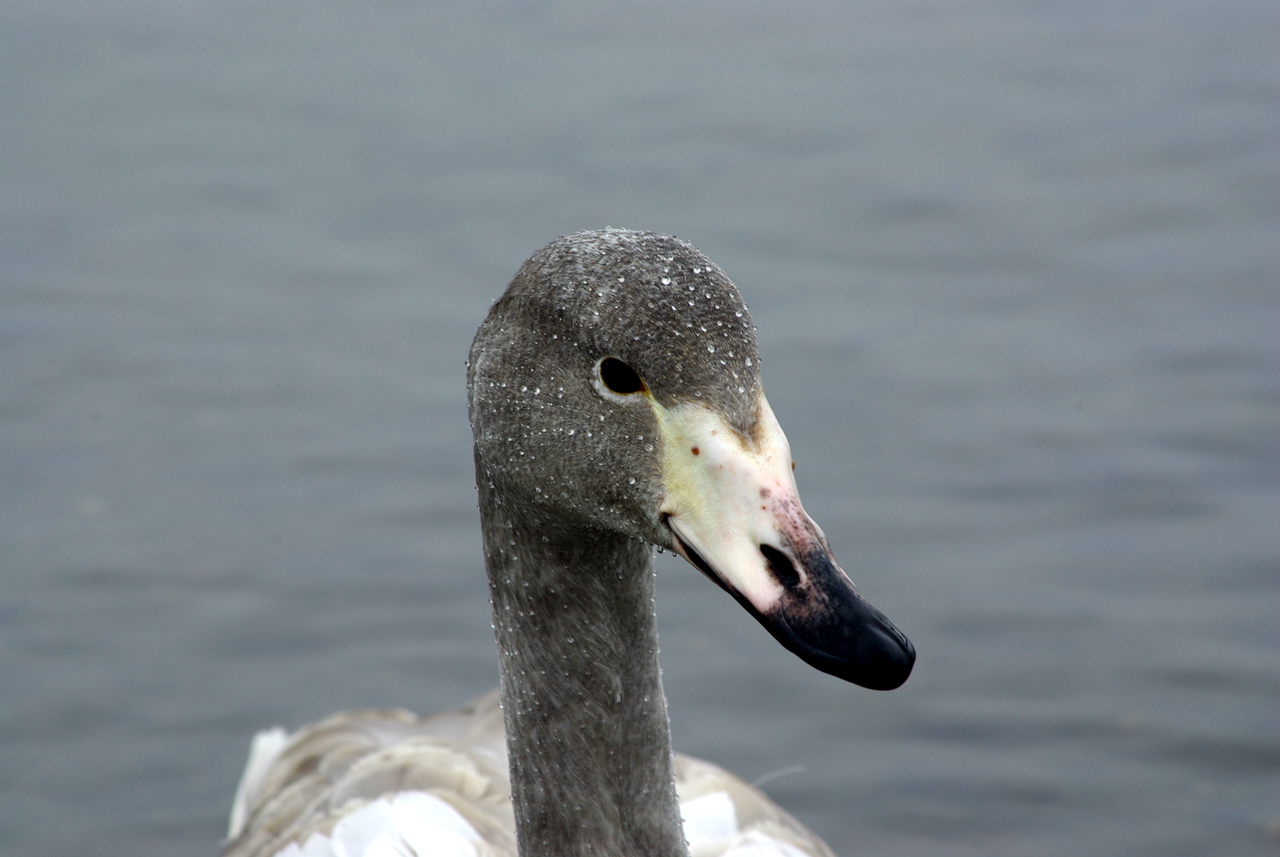
Young whooper swan at Lake Kussharo, Japan

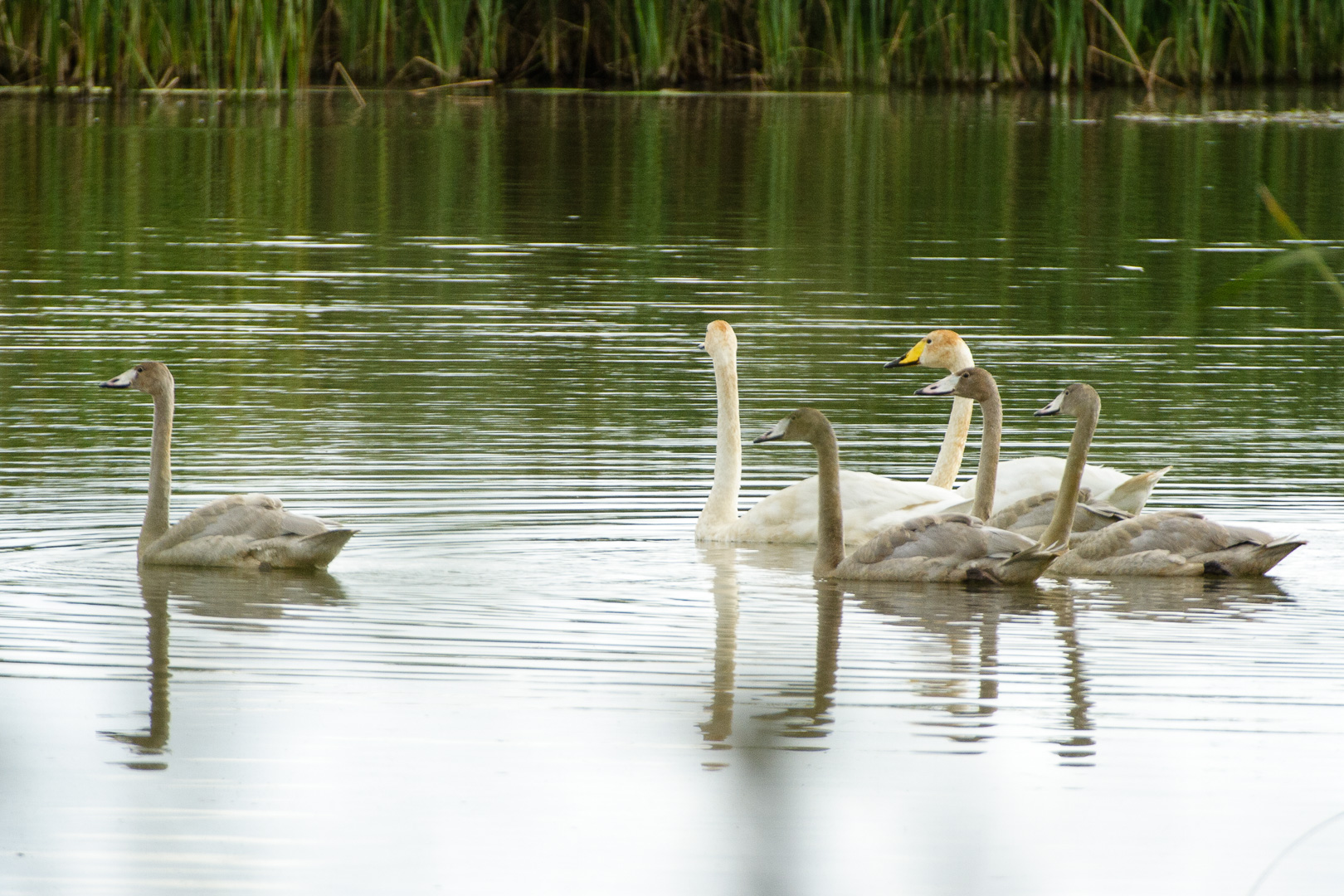
Young whooper swans with parents at Stawinoga ponds, Poland

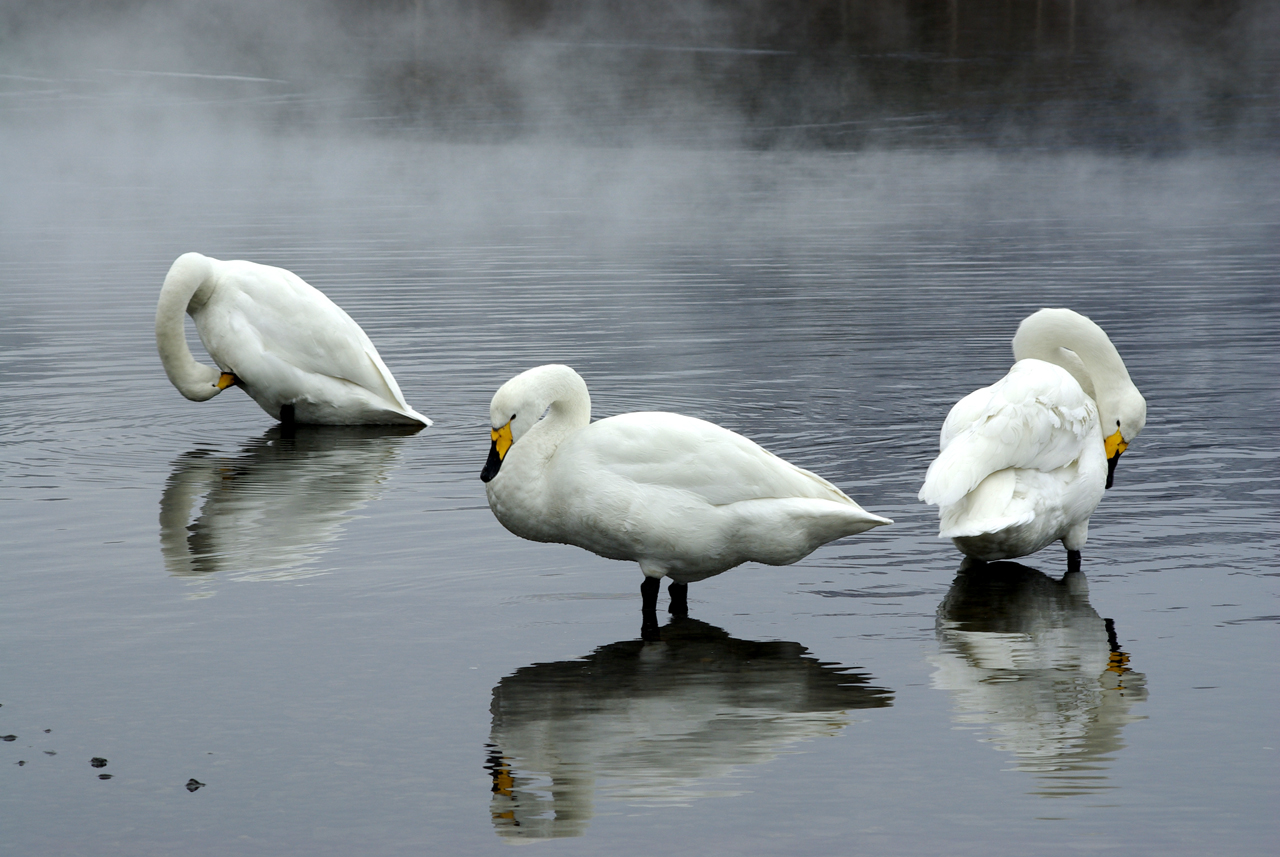
Whooper swans resting at Sunayu Onsen at Lake Kussharo, Japan

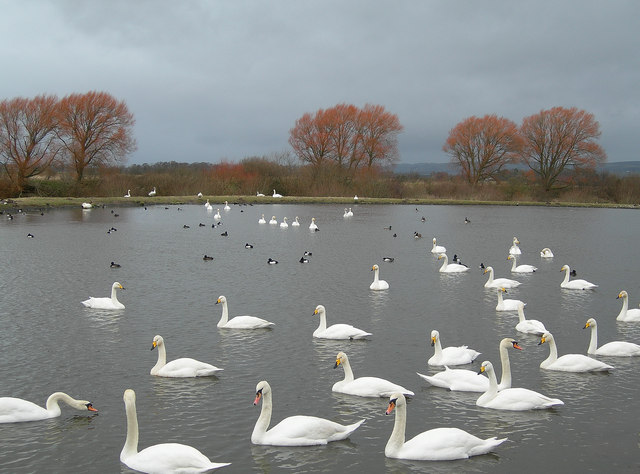
Mute swans with orange bills and whooper swans with yellow bills

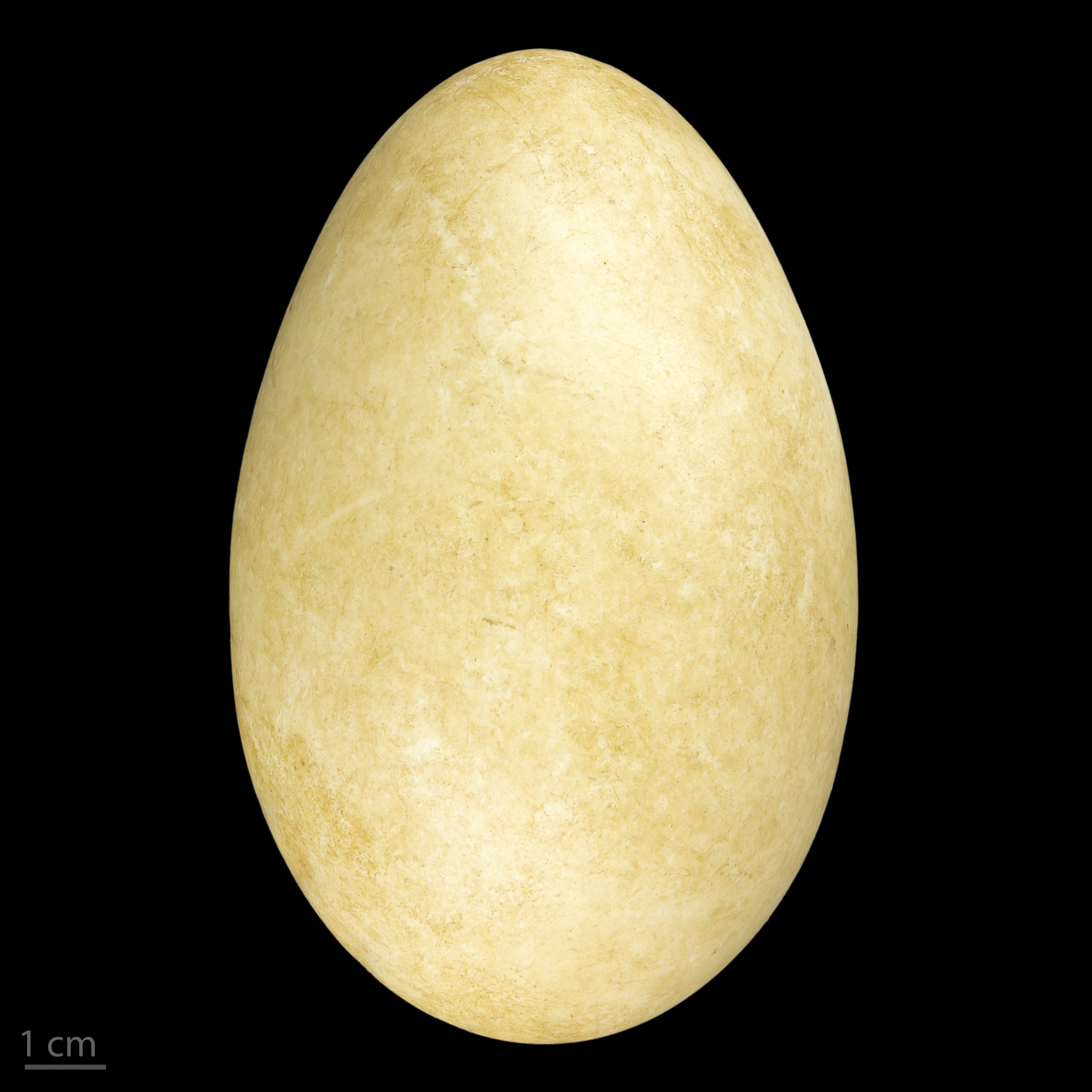
Cygnus cygnus – MHNT
