= Yūmō Line =

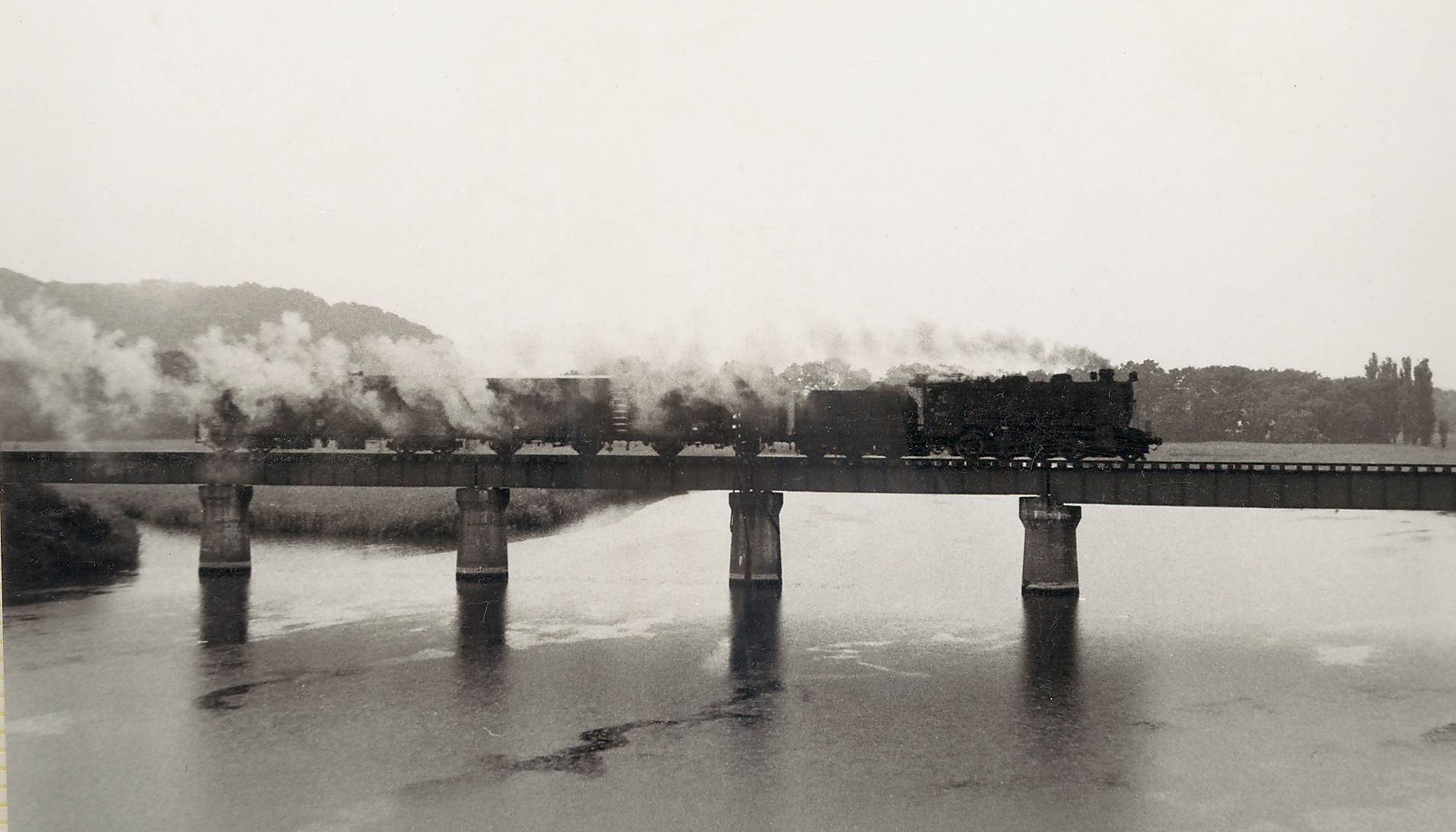
- JNR Class 9600-hauled freight train crossing the Abashiri River in 1974

Overview
- Status: Disused
- Termini: Naka-Yubetsu; Abashiri
- Stations: 16

History
- Opened: 10 October 1935
- Closed: 20 March 1987

Technical
- Line length: 89.8 km (55.8 mi)
- Track gauge: 1,067 mm (3 ft 6 in)
- Minimum radius: 200 m (660 ft)
- Maximum incline: 25 ‰

The Yūmō Line (湧網線) was a Japanese railway line which was operated by Japanese National Railways in Hokkaidō. The line went from Naka-Yubetsu Station to Abashiri Station, passing Lake Saroma, the Sea of Okhotsk, Lake Notoro and Lake Abashiri.

Due to rural flight and motorisation in the 1960s, ridership dropped and it was marked as one of the specified local lines to be closed. The line was closed in its entirety on 20 March 1987. In the final stages of operation, the number of trains was reduced to just five round trips per day for the entire line, and one local train from Hama-Saroma to Naka-Yubetsu.

== List of stations ==
All stations are located in Hokkaido Prefecture.

Name	km	Connecting lines	Coordinates	Town
Naka-Yūbetsu (中湧別)	0.0	Nayoro Main Line (1935–1987)	44.18539°N 143.59589°E	Yūbetsu, Monbetsu
Gokazan (五鹿山)	2.6		44.18608°N 143.62414°E	Yūbetsu, Monbetsu
Fukushima (福島)	4.3		44.18183°N 143.64469°E	Yūbetsu, Monbetsu
Barō (芭露)	9.9		44.15139°N 143.69333°E	Yūbetsu, Monbetsu
Shibushi (志撫子)	15.3		44.11306°N 143.72236°E	Yūbetsu, Monbetsu
Kerochi (計呂地)	16.5		44.10294°N 143.72861°E	Yūbetsu, Monbetsu
Hama-Tokotan (浜床丹)	19.2		44.09842°N 143.75339°E	Saroma, Tokoro
Tokotan (床丹)	21.0		44.08300°N 143.76022°E	Saroma, Tokoro
Wakasato (若里)	25.0		44.04853°N 143.75675°E	Saroma, Tokoro
Saroma (佐呂間)	29.3		44.01931°N 143.77861°E	Saroma, Tokoro
Sakaibashi (堺橋)	31.8		44.01583°N 143.80694°E	Saroma, Tokoro
Kōseizawa (興生沢)	33.7		44.02556°N 143.82483°E	Saroma, Tokoro
Chirai (知来)	36.0		44.03164°N 143.85147°E	Saroma, Tokoro
Momijibashi (紅葉橋)	39.1		44.03683°N 143.88931°E	Saroma, Tokoro
Nikura (仁倉)	41.4		44.05028°N 143.90972°E	Saroma, Tokoro
Hama-Saroma (浜佐呂間)	46.0		44.07992°N 143.94417°E	Saroma, Tokoro
Kitami-Tomioka (北見富丘)	49.4		44.08833°N 143.98139°E	Tokoro, Tokoro (Now: Kitami)
Higashi-Tomioka (東富丘)	51.9		44.08139°N 144.01139°E	Tokoro, Tokoro (Now: Kitami)
Kitami-Kyōritsu (北見共立)	54.0		44.08375°N 144.03492°E	Tokoro, Tokoro (Now: Kitami)
Tosa (土佐)			44.10965°N 144.05264°E	Tokoro, Tokoro (Now: Kitami)
Tokoro (常呂)	59.5		44.12286°N 144.07167°E	Tokoro, Tokoro (Now: Kitami)
Tokorokō (常呂港)	61.9		44.12111°N 144.10461°E	Tokoro, Tokoro (Now: Kitami)
Notoro (能取)	66.7		44.09406°N 144.11825°E	Abashiri
Naka-Notoro (中能取)	69.5		44.07118°N 144.10883°E	Abashiri
Kitami-Heiwa (北見平和)	73.1		44.03992°N 144.09944°E	Abashiri
Ubaranai (卯原内)	76.6		44.01389°N 144.11139°E	Abashiri
Futami-chūō (二見中央)	80.2		44.01317°N 144.15606°E	Abashiri
Futamigaoka (二見ヶ岡)	82.1		44.00408°N 144.17161°E	Abashiri
Ōmagari (大曲)	87.9		44.01278°N 144.23300°E	Abashiri
Abashiri (網走)	89.8	Sekihoku Main Line; Senmō Main Line	44.01986°N 144.25417°E	Abashiri

== History ==
The line was planned as a shortcut between Nakayubetsu on the Nayoro Main Line and Abashiri on the Abashiri Main Line (present-day Sekihoku Main Line).

Construction proceeded from both the Abashiri and Naka-Yubetsu sides. In 1935, the lines opened respectively as the Yumo East Line and the Yumo West Line. Construction was interrupted by World War II and was later fully completed in 1953.

The enaction of the Japanese National Railways Restructuring Act in 1980 designated the Yūmō Line as a second-phase specified railway line. It was then closed on 20 March 1987 and replaced by a bus service by Abashiri Bus.
