= Abashiri Quasi-National Park =

Protected area in Japan

- 網走国定公園
- IUCN category V (protected landscape/seascape)
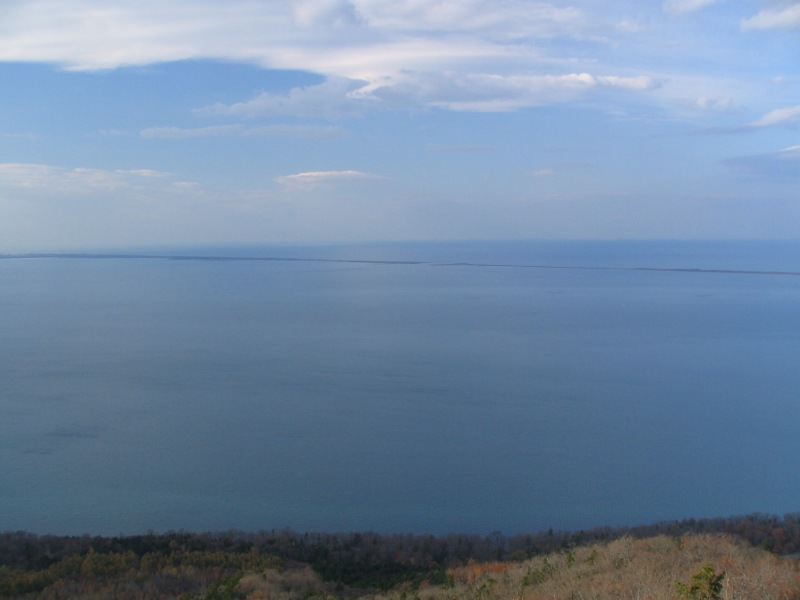
- Overlooking Lake Saroma (June 2007)

- Location within Hokkaido Location within Japan
- Location: Hokkaidō, Japan
- Nearest city: Abashiri, Kitami, Koshimizu, Ōzora, Saroma, Shari, Yūbetsu
- Coordinates: 43.890556°N 144.579722°E
- Area: 372.61 square kilometres (143.87 mi^{2})
- Established: July 1, 1958

Abashiri Quasi-National Park (網走国定公園, Abashiri Kokutei Kōen) is a quasi-national park in Japan. The park protects the waters and surrounding coastline of the lakes and lagoons along the Sea of Okhotsk on Hokkaido. This includes such lakes as Lake Abashiri and Lake Notoro as well as Lake Tōfutsu and Lake Saroma. Lake Saroma is the fourth largest lake in Japan. Most of the park lies within the limits of Abashiri in Okhotsk Subprefecture of northeastern Hokkaidō.

The park includes a Marine Protected Area, which falls under the IUCN category Ib. The park is either 37261 ha or 43559 ha.

An important part of Abashiri Quasi-National Park is its floral display. Some of the most prominent species are in the following table.

Scientific name	Common name	Native name
Thermopsis lupinoides	Goldbanner	センダイハギ / 先代萩
Gentiana triflora var. japonica		エゾリンドウ
Convallaria keiskei	Lily of the valley	スズラン
Iris setosa	Iris	ヒオウギアヤメ
Hemerocallis yezoensis	Daylily	エゾキスゲ / 蝦夷黄萓
Lilium pensylvanicum		エゾスカシユリ / 蝦夷透百合
Salicornia europaea	Glasswort	アッケシソウ / 厚岸草

== See also ==
- List of national parks of Japan
