= Mount Tento =

Mountain in Abashiri, Hokkaidō, Japan

- 天都山 (Tentozan)
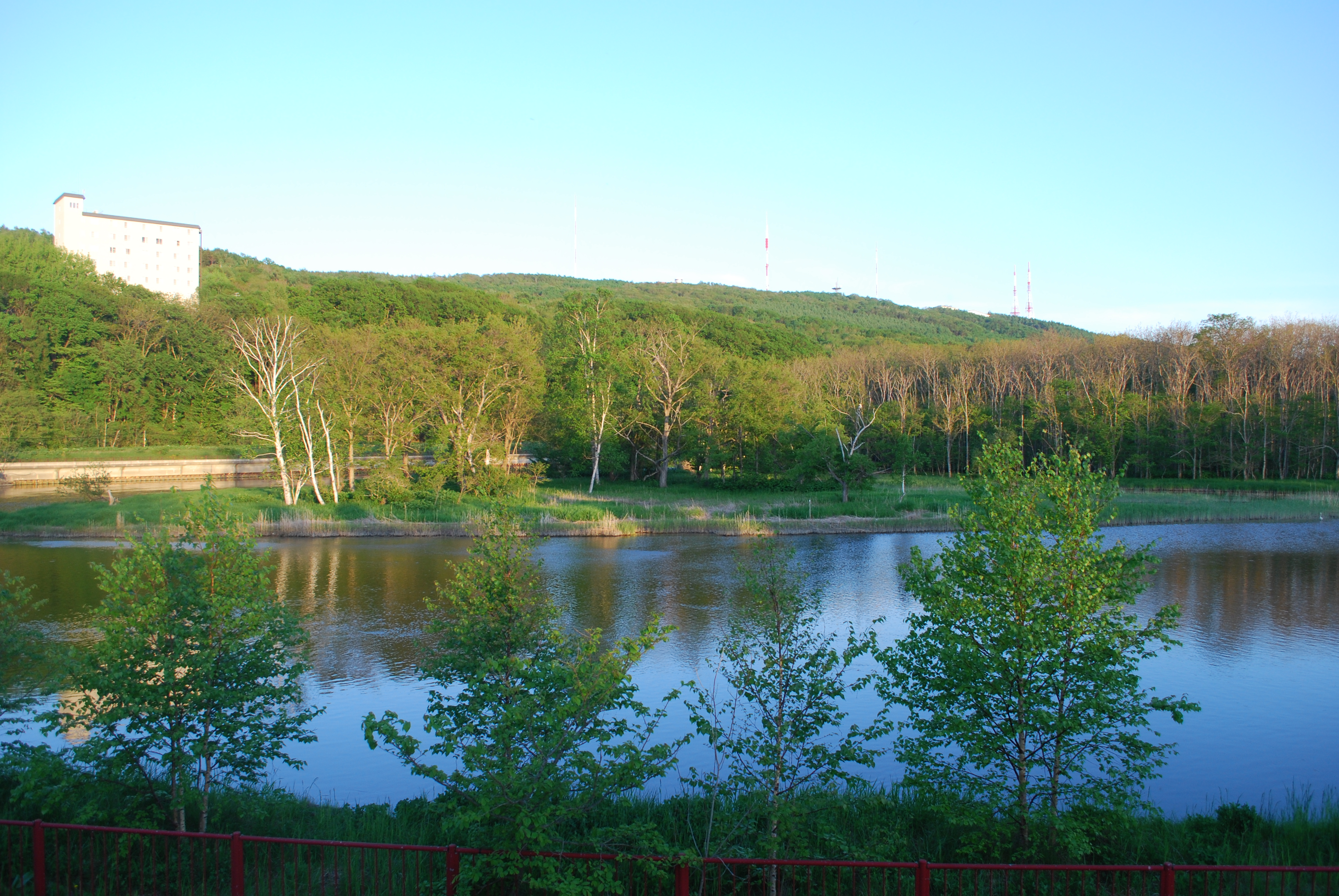

Highest point
- Elevation: 207 m (679 ft)
- Coordinates: 44°00′04″N 144°14′24″E

Geography
- Location within Hokkaido
- Location: Abashiri, Hokkaido, Japan

Mount Tento (天都山, Tentozan) is a nationally designated Place of Scenic Beauty in Abashiri, Hokkaido, Japan. Rising to a height of 207 metres, the mountain commands views over the Sea of Okhotsk, Lake Abashiri, Lake Notoro, Lake Tōfutsu, and, from afar, the Shiretoko Peninsula and Akan Volcanic Complex.

== Overview ==
An observation deck is set up at the summit of the mountain, and you can hope for Shiretoko mountain ranges such as Lake Abashiri, Lake Notoro, Sea of Okhotsk, Shiretoko Peninsula and Mount Shari · Mount Unabetsu. Observatory is free. Adjacent to the observatory, there are Okhotsk Drift icehouse, Tenriyama Sakura Park. Sakura Park has roughly 1,000 Prunus sargentii, pink flowers bloom and gather guests for cherry blossoms. "Tenriyama Sakura Festival" will be held in May sponsored by citizens volunteers in May when the flowers are about to be seen.

== Facility ==
The summit observatory, Okhotsk Sea Ice Museum, Hokkaido Northern Ethnic Museum, Lake View ski area, flower garden Do-tent, in addition to other park facilities are in place, on the hillside, Abashiri Prison Museum is there. The Tianyama area is the main tourist destination of Abashiri city.

There are NHK Kitami Broadcasting Station and private TV broadcasting station in the vicinity of the summit.

== Transportation ==
In addition to passing Hokkaido Route No. 683 Okuzenyama Park line connecting urban districts from the city center via Tianyu Mountain, there is Abashiri-shi Tenriyama Line from Japan National Route 39 to the summit via the Abashiri Prison Museum. It is approximately 10 minutes by car from city center.

From Abashiri Station/ Abashiri Bus Terminal, a bus service bus (Abashiri city tourism facility tour / Tianyu mountain line) is operated by Abashiri bus. Winter of drift ice in the tourist season, Abashiri Drift Ice sightseeing Icebreaker " Aurora " stops(Umeshima Highway is extended to the service of between).

== Gallery ==
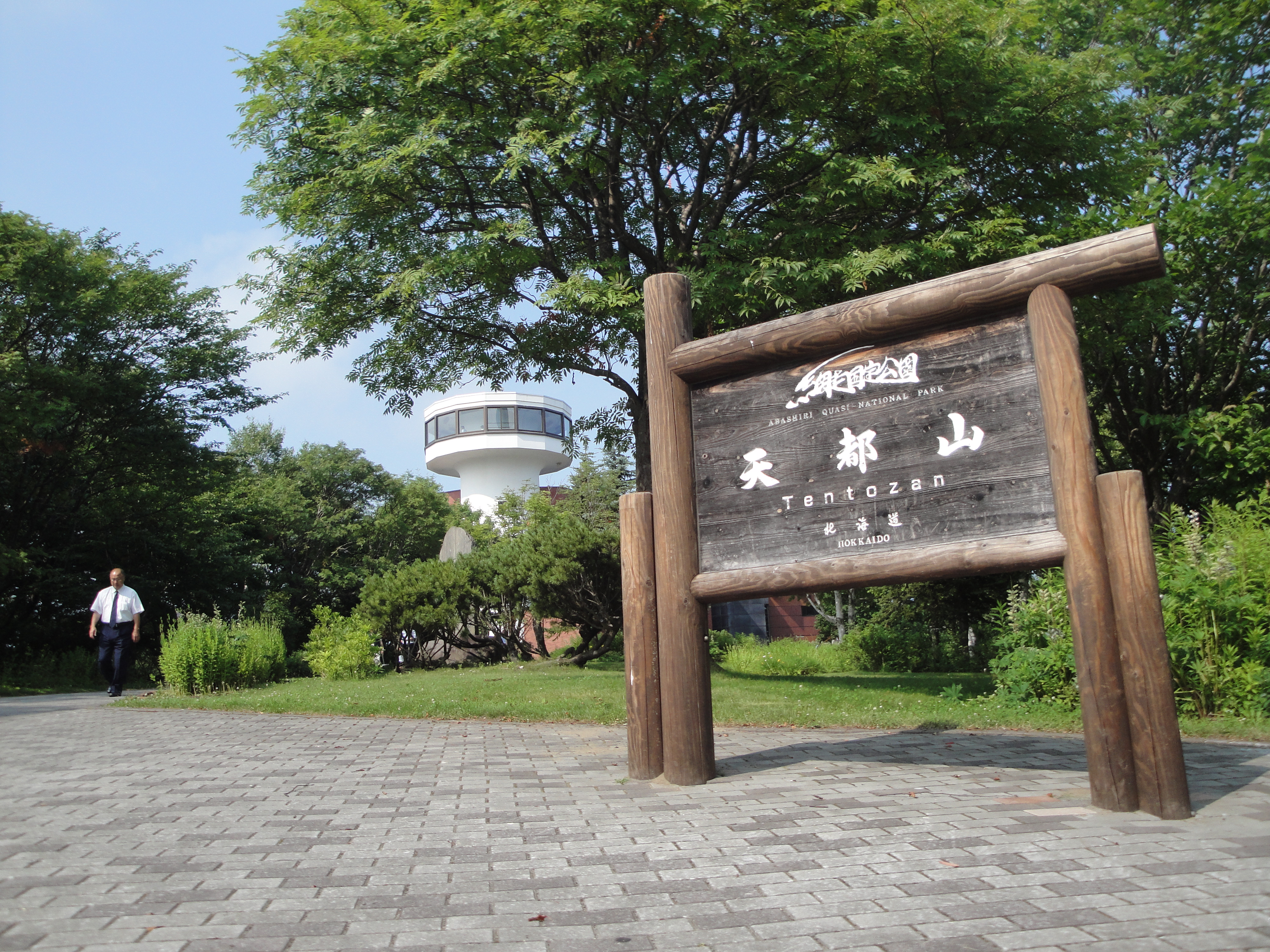
Heavenly Hill

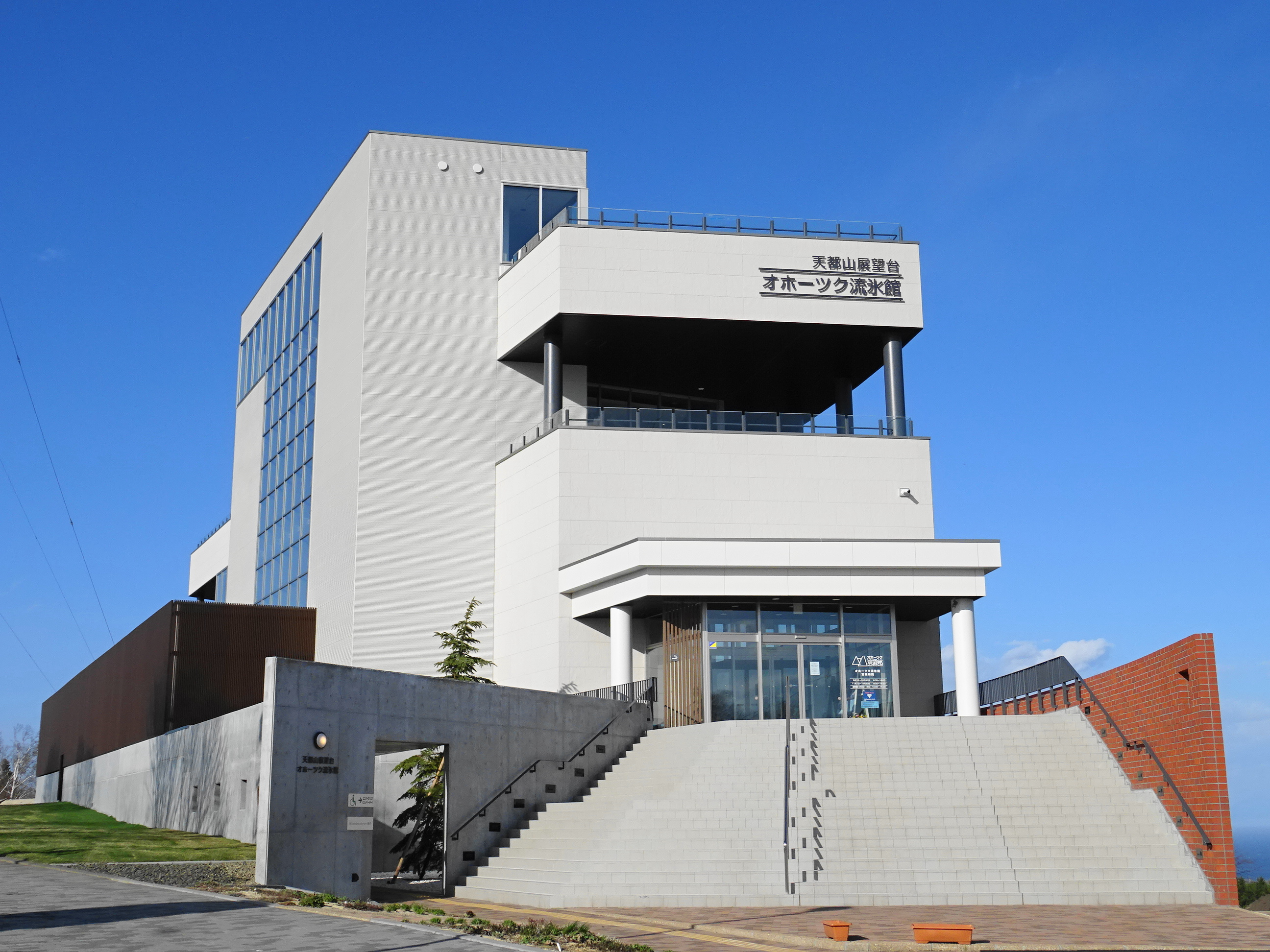
Mount Tianmu Observatory Okhotsk Flow Ice Museum

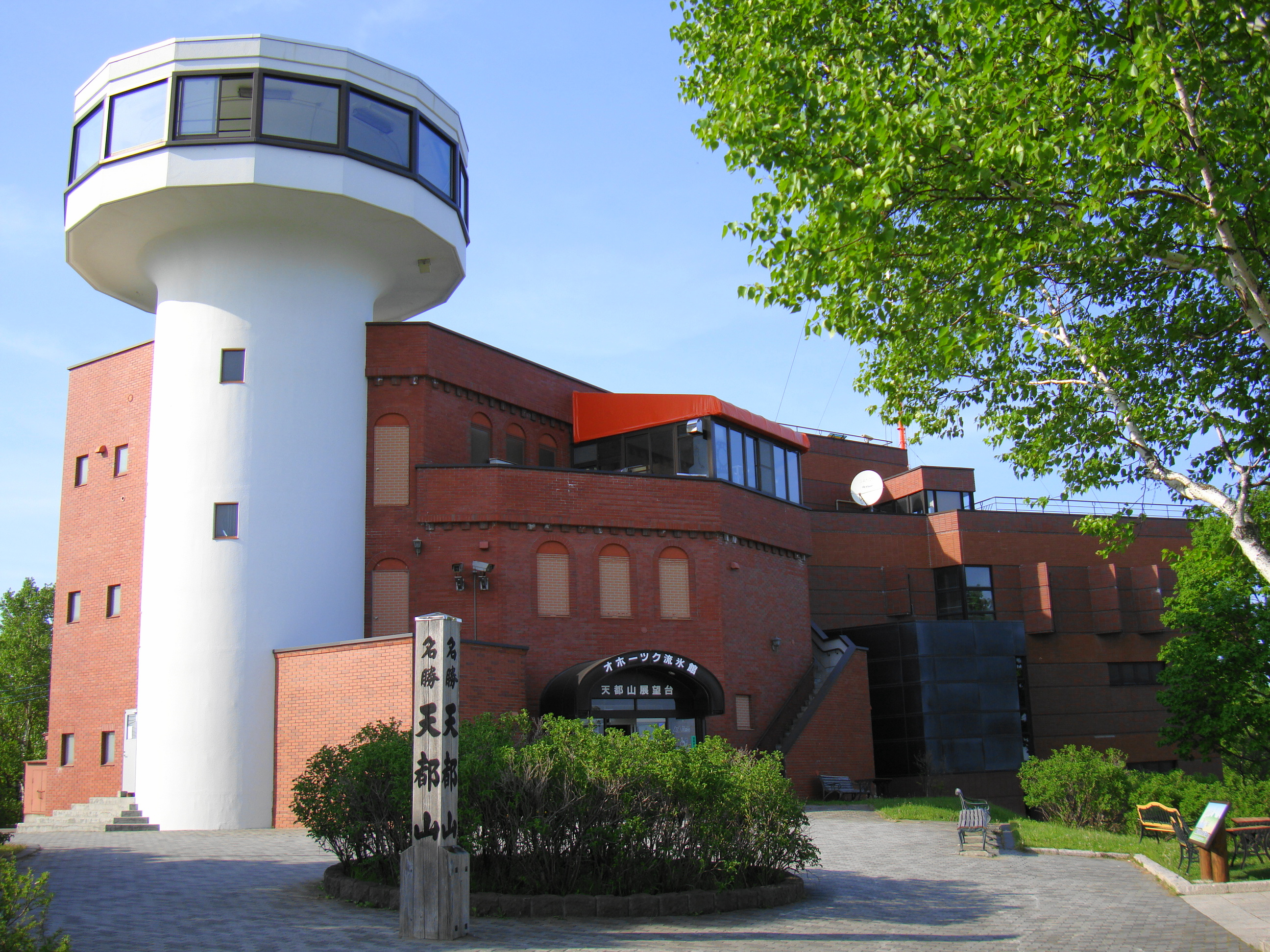
Old Heaven Hill Observatory Okhotsk Flow Ice Museum

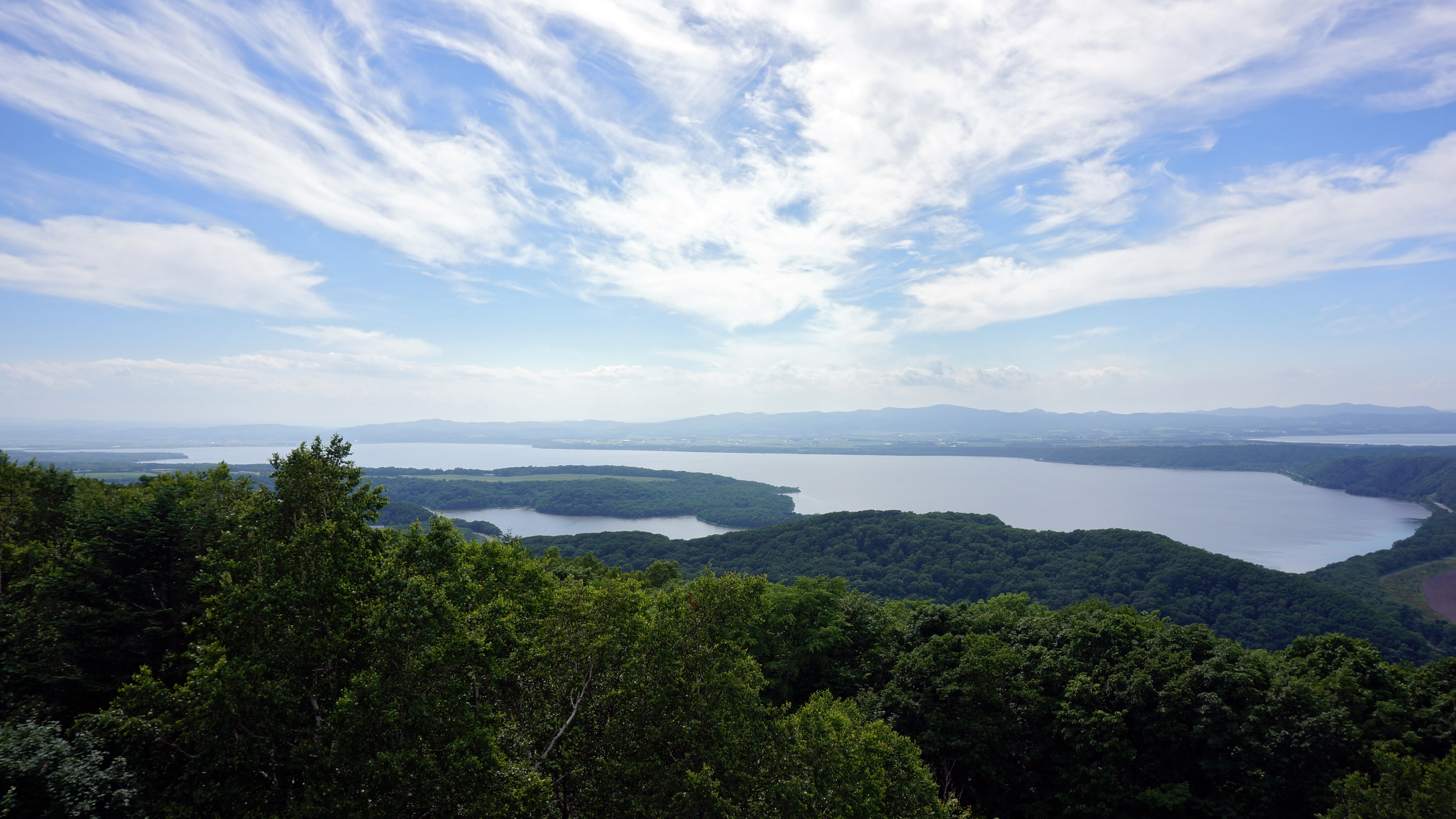
From Heavenly Hill overlooking lake

== See also ==
- Monuments of Japan
