= List of lakes of Japan =

The list of lakes in Japan ranked by surface area.

Rank	Name	Region	Prefecture¹	Municipalities	Water	Area (km^{2})	Max Depth (m)	Altitude (m)	Volume (km^{3})
1	Biwa	Kansai	Shiga	Ōtsu, Kusatsu, Higashi-Ōmi, Hikone; Nagahama, Moriyama, Ōmi-Hachiman; Takashima, Yasu, Maibara	Fresh	670.3	103.8	85	27.5
2	Kasumigaura	Kantō	Ibaraki	Tsuchiura, Ishioka, Omitama, Inashiki; Ami, Kasumigaura, Namegata, Itako, Miho	Fresh	167.6	7.10	0	0.85
3	Saroma	Hokkaido	Okhotsk	Kitami, Saroma, Yūbetsu	Brackish	151.9	19.6	0	1.3
4	Inawashiro	Tōhoku	Fukushima	Aizuwakamatsu, Inawashiro, Kōriyama	Fresh	103.3	94.6	514	5.40
5	Nakaumi	San'in	Shimane; Tottori	Matsue, Yonago, Yasugi; Sakaiminato, Higashi-Izumo	Brackish	86.2	17.1	0	0.47
6	Kussharo	Hokkaido	Kushiro	Teshikaga	Fresh	79.3	117.5	121	2.25
7	Shinji	San'in	Shimane	Matsue, Izumo, Hikawa	Brackish	79.1	6.0	0	0.34
8	Shikotsu	Hokkaido	Ishikari	Chitose	Fresh	78.4	360.1	247	20.9
9	Tōya	Hokkaido	Iburi	Tōyako, Sōbetsu	Fresh	70.7	179.9	84	8.19
10	Hamana	Tōkai	Shizuoka	Hamamatsu, Kosai, Arai	Brackish	65.0	13.1	0	0.35
11	Ogawara	Tōhoku	Aomori	Misawa, Tōhoku, Rokkasho	Brackish	62.2	24.4	0	0.714
12	Towada	Tōhoku	Aomori; Akita	Towada, Kosaka	Fresh	61.0	326.8	400	4.19
13	Notoro	Hokkaido	Okhotsk	Abashiri	Brackish	58.4	23.1	0	0.5
14	Fūren	Hokkaido	Nemuro	Nemuro, Betsukai	Brackish	57.5	13.0	0	0.0564
15	Kitaura	Kantō	Ibaraki	Kashima, Hokota, Namegata, Itako	Fresh	35.2	7.0	0	0.18
16	Abashiri	Hokkaido	Okhotsk	Abashiri, Ōzora	Brackish	32.3	16.1	0	0.2
17	Akkeshi	Hokkaido	Kushiro	Akkeshi, Hokkaido	Fresh	32.3	11.0	0	
18	Hachirō	Tōhoku	Akita	Katagami, Oga, Gojōme, Ikawa, Ōgata	Fresh	27.7	12.0	0	
19	Tazawa	Tōhoku	Akita	Senboku	Fresh	25.8	423.4	249	7.2
20	Mashū	Hokkaido	Kushiro	Teshikaga	Fresh	19.2	211.4	351	
21	Jūsan	Tōhoku	Aomori	Goshogawara, Tsugaru, Nakadomari	Brackish	18.1	1.5	0	
22	Kutcharo	Hokkaido	Sōya	Hamatonbetsu	Fresh	13.3	3.3	0	0.014
23	Suwa	Chūbu	Nagano	Okaya, Suwa, Shimo-Suwa	Fresh	13.3	7.6	759	0.06135
24	Akan	Hokkaido	Kushiro	Kushiro	Fresh	13.0	44.8	420	0.249
25	Chūzenji	Kantō	Tochigi	Nikkō	Fresh	11.8	163.0	1269	1.1
26	Inba	Kantō	Chiba	Yachiyo, Sakura, Narita, Inzai, Shisui, Sakae	Fresh	11.55	2.5	2.5	0.0277
27	Ikeda	Kyūshū	Kagoshima	Ibusuki	Fresh	10.9	233.0	66	1.38
28	Hibara	Tōhoku	Fukushima	Kitashiobara	Fresh	10.7	30.5	822	0.13
29	Ashi	Kantō	Kanagawa	Hakone	Fresh	7.03	43.5	723	
30	Kuttara	Hokkaido	Iburi	Shiraoi	Fresh	4.68	148	258	0.491

1) For lakes in the Hokkaidō region, Subprefecture is listed

== See also ==
- List of lakes by area
- List of lakes by depth
- List of lakes by volume
