= Saroma =

Saroma may refer to:

- Saroma, Hokkaido
- Lake Saroma
- 5059 Saroma
