= Abashiri Prison =

Prison in Abashiri, Japan

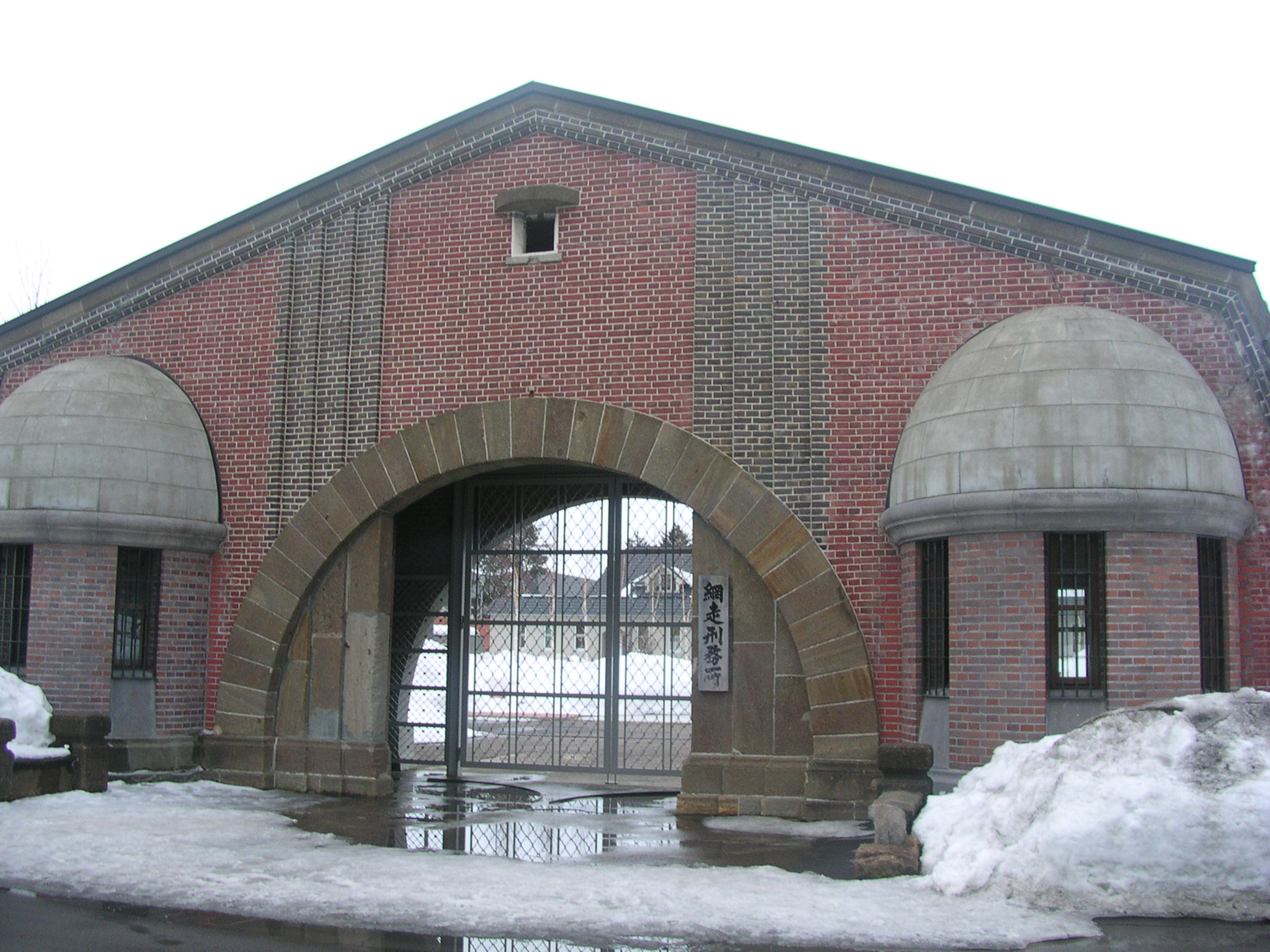
- Interactive map of Abashiri Prison
- Location: Abashiri, Hokkaido, Japan; 44°0′59.7″N 144°13′51.8″E
- Status: Operational
- Opened: 1890
- Managed by: Ministry of Justice

Abashiri Prison (Japanese: 網走刑務所, Hepburn: Abashiri Keimusho) is a prison in Abashiri, Hokkaido that opened in 1890. The northernmost prison in Japan, it is located near the Abashiri River and east of Mount Tento. It holds inmates with sentences of less than ten years. Older parts of the prison were relocated to the base of Mount Tento in 1983, where they operate as the country's only prison museum. It is a prison feared by Japanese criminals due to its grueling labor and freezing environment.

== History ==
In part to increase Japanese populations on the island as part of the Meiji Restoration, the Meiji government implemented penal transportation policies for Hokkaido in 1868. In April 1890, the Meiji government sent over a thousand political prisoners to the isolated Abashiri village. Many of these political prisoners were samurai from Tokugawa period who were convicted during the 1877 Satsuma rebellion.

Prisoners were forced to perform a variety of tasks from carpentry to agriculture. Notably, poor water quality in neighboring areas forced convicts to build water pipes, dams, and reservoirs to supply their own drinking water and irrigate neighboring fields. In addition, convicts at Abashiri Prison were forced to build roads linking the area to the more populous south. Construction of Hokkaido's Central Road relied on penal labor from Hokkaido. Many prisoners died along one section of the road between Abashiri village and Asahikawa, causing it to be referred to as Prisoner's Road. Initial conditions were extremely harsh, with insufficient food and rest, and over 200 prisoners died as a result of malnutrition, accidents, and as punishment for attempting to escape.

The political advisor Kaneko Kentaro had previously submitted a report implying that the government was not responsible for providing funerary services to convicts who perished during the process of road building. During the 1960s, Hokkaido residents were influenced by a nationwide effort to uncover history and began excavating prisoner remains along Prisoner's Road.

Abashiri prison was constructed amid the globalization and standardization of penal theory. The built environment facilitated discipline and surveillance, which was emphasized by the panopticon layout of the building.

Abashiri Prison later became known for being a self-sufficient farming prison, and was cited as a model for others throughout Japan.

Most of the prison burned down in a 1909 fire, but it was reconstructed in 1912. Previously known as Abashiri Kangoku (網走監獄), it took on its current name in 1922. In 1984, the prison moved to a modern reinforced concrete complex.

Due to the 1965 film Abashiri Prison and its sequels, the prison became a popular tourist attraction. The prison is also known for its wooden nipopo (ニポポ) dolls carved by its inmates.

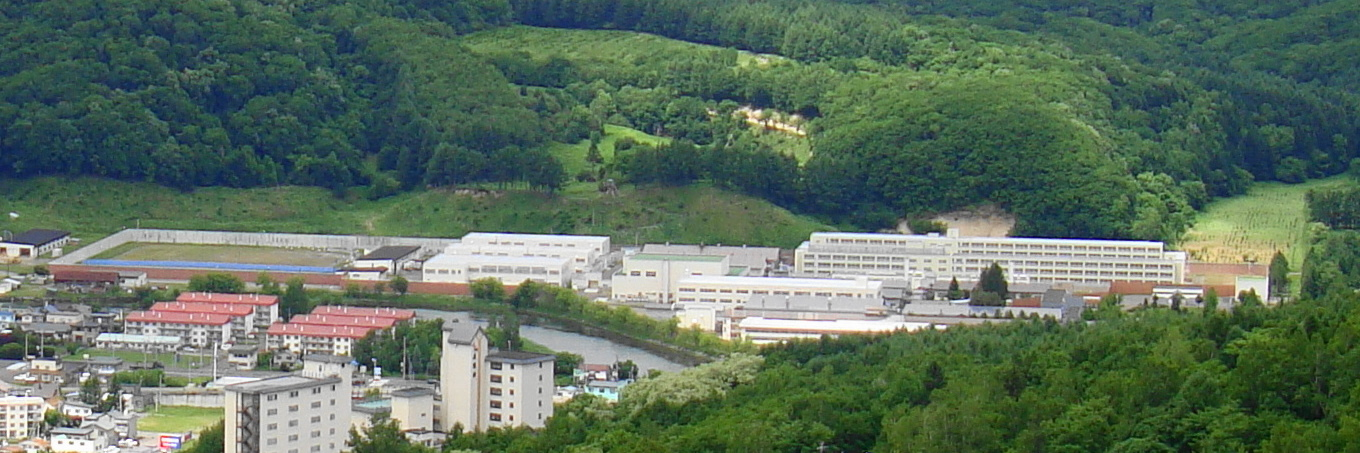
Abashiri Prison in June 2010.

== Museum ==
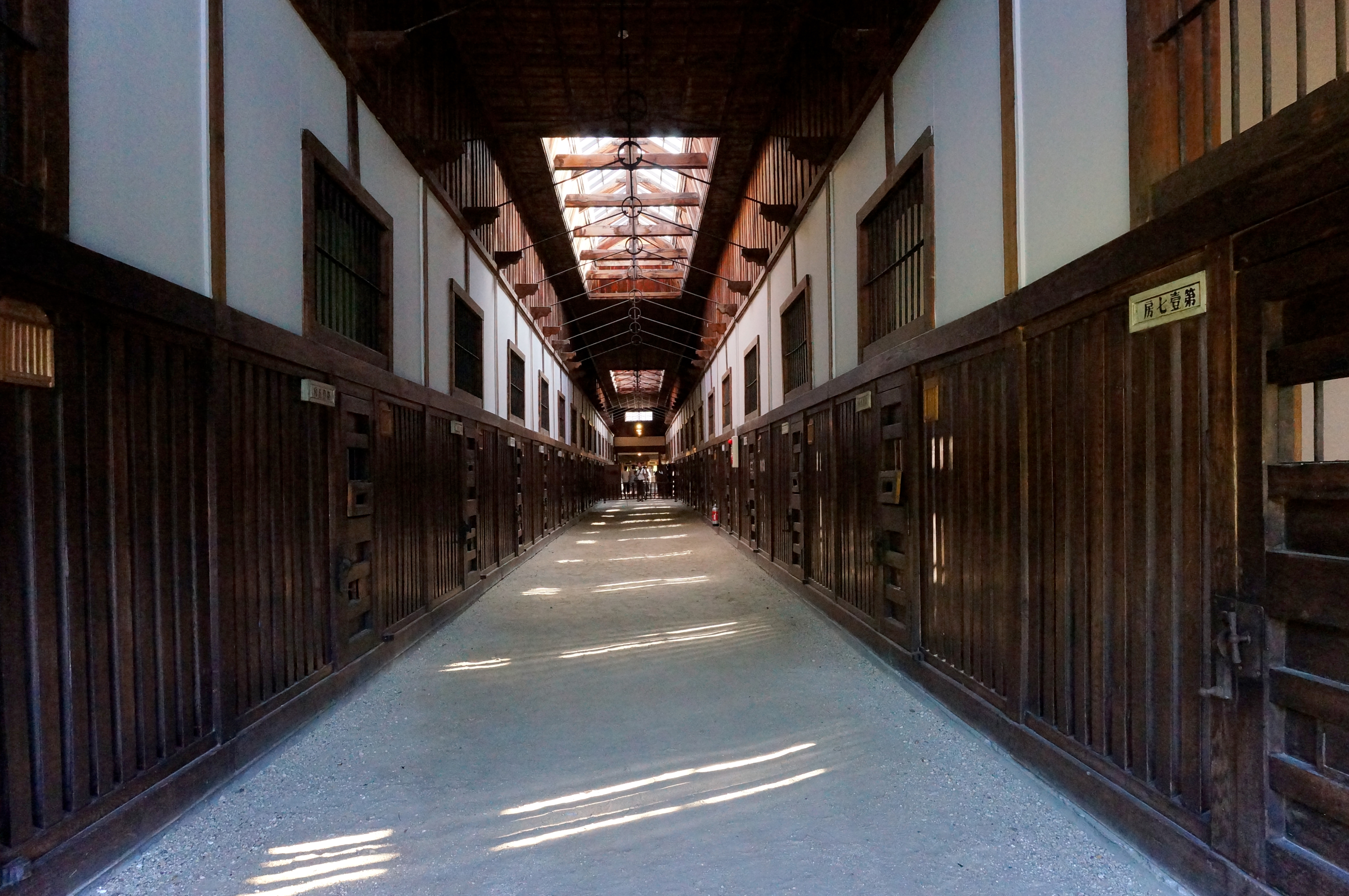
The inside of the original prison house, one of the Important Cultural Properties at the Abashiri Prison Museum, 2013

Inside and outside the prison museum, 2022

In 1983, older parts of the prison were relocated to the base of Mount Tento and operate as a museum called the Abashiri Prison Museum (博物館網走監獄). It is the only prison museum in the country. As of 2016, eight of the buildings preserved at the museum are designated Important Cultural Property by the Agency for Cultural Affairs, while three are registered Tangible Cultural Property. Those who visit the prison partake in dark tourism, tourism centered around areas significant because of death and suffering that occurred in those areas.

== Notable inmates ==
- Tsuda Sanzō, the policeman who attempted to assassinate Nicholas II of Russia
- Yoshie Shiratori, the only person to escape from Abashiri Prison
- Kyuichi Tokuda, politician imprisoned at Abashiri from 1934 to 1940
- Kenji Miyamoto, politician
- Branko Vukelić, Yugoslav spy
- Shūsuke Nomura, activist
- George Abe, author and former yakuza

== In fiction ==
In fiction, it is often depicted as an "impregnable" prison. The 1965 film Abashiri Prison spawned a popular series of yakuza films featuring the prison.

In the 1984 video game Hokkaido Rensa Satsujin: Ohotsuku ni Kiyu, nipopo dolls made by Abashiri Prison inmates play a role in the story.

In the 2012 video game Yakuza 5, one of the protagonists, Taiga Saejima, is incarcerated at and escapes from Abashiri Prison.

In "Mako Tanida", a 2014 episode of the television series The Blacklist, the episode's titular yakuza boss escapes from Abashiri Prison.

The 2014 manga series Golden Kamuy, set shortly after the Russo-Japanese War, features a raid on Abashiri Prison as one of its major plot points.

In the 2020 novel The Lost Future of Pepperharrow by Natasha Pulley, set in 1888 Japan, Abashiri Prison is one of the main plot locations.
