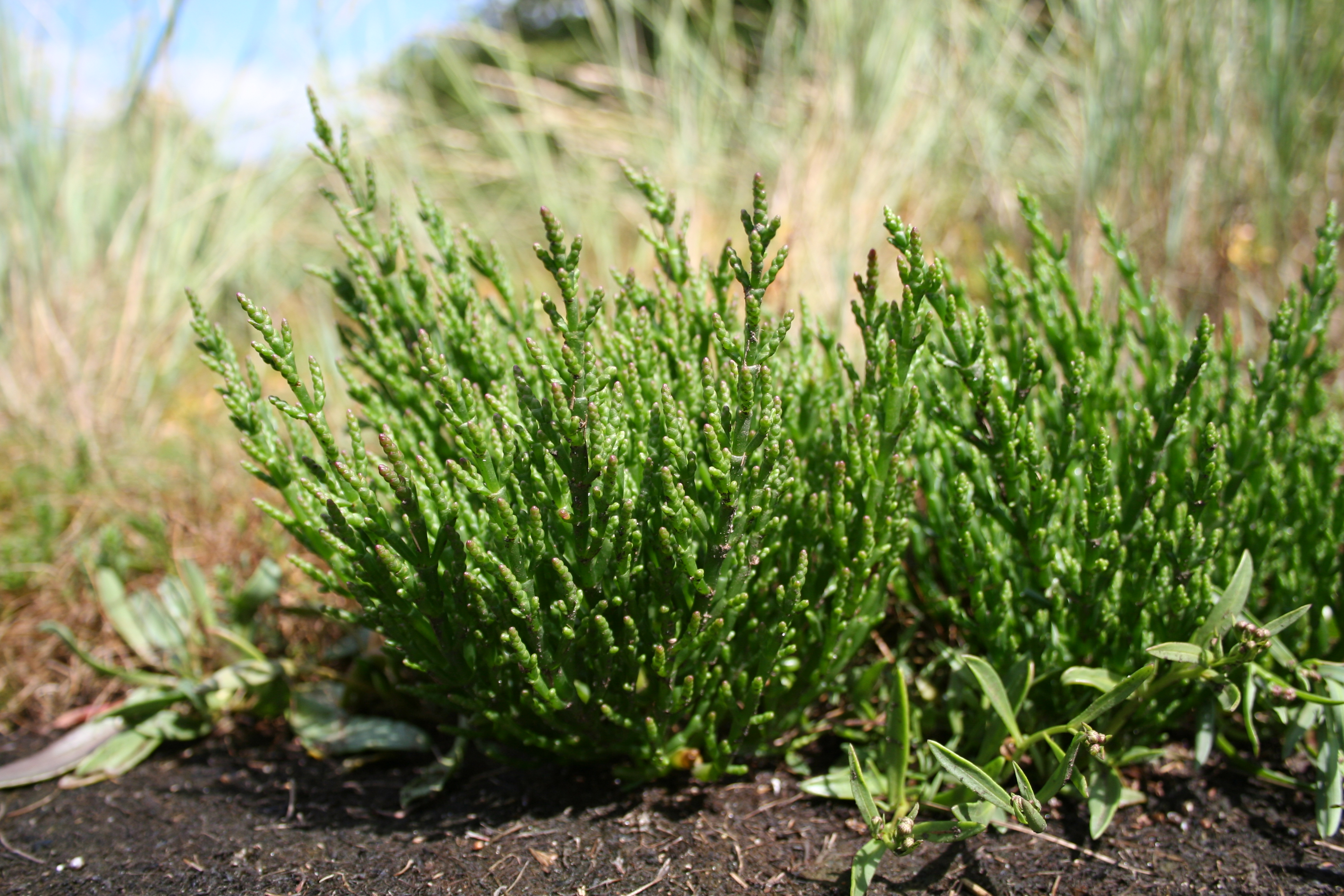

Scientific classification
- Kingdom: Plantae
- Clade: Tracheophytes
- Clade: Angiosperms
- Clade: Eudicots
- Order: Caryophyllales
- Family: Amaranthaceae
- Genus: Salicornia
- Species: S. europaea

Binomial name
- Salicornia europaea L.

Synonyms
- List: Salicornia annua Sm.; Salicornia appressa Dumort.; Salicornia biennis Afzel. ex Sm.; Salicornia europaea subsp. brachystachya (G.Mey.) R.Dahmen & Wissk.; Salicornia europaea var. herbacea L.; Salicornia europaea var. pachystachya (W.D.J.Koch) Fernald; Salicornia gracillima Moss; Salicornia herbacea (L.) L.; Salicornia herbacea var. annua (Sm.) Pursh; Salicornia herbacea var. pachystachya W.D.J.Koch; Salicornia herbacea var. ramosissima Hook.f.; Salicornia intermedia J.Woods; Salicornia megastachya J.Woods; Salicornia peregrina Weinm. ex Ung.-Sternb.; Salicornia radicans Mert. & W.D.J.Koch; Salicornia ramosissima (Hook.f.) J.Woods ex W.A.Clarke & E.S.Marshall; Salicornia salsola Montbret ex Ung.-Sternb.; Salicornia simonkaiana Soó; Salicornia smithiana Moss

= Salicornia europaea =

Species of flowering plant

Salicornia europaea, known as marsh samphire, common glasswort or just glasswort, is a halophytic annual dicot flowering plant. Other common names include pickle weed, saltwort, and chicken toe (due to the shape). It is a succulent plant with high water content, accounting for its slightly translucent look (the source of the name 'glasswort'). It is found near saline water in Europe and is edible both raw and cooked.

== Description ==
Glasswort plants are relatively small and have jointed, bright green stems. During autumn, these plants turn red or purple. Their leaves are small and scale like, and they produce fleshy fruits that contain a single seed.

Like most members of the subfamily Salicornioideae, Salicornia species use the C3 carbon fixation pathway to take in carbon dioxide from the surrounding atmosphere.

== Distribution and habitat ==
It is found on most coastlines in Europe.

It grows in various zones of intertidal salt marshes, on beaches, and among mangroves.

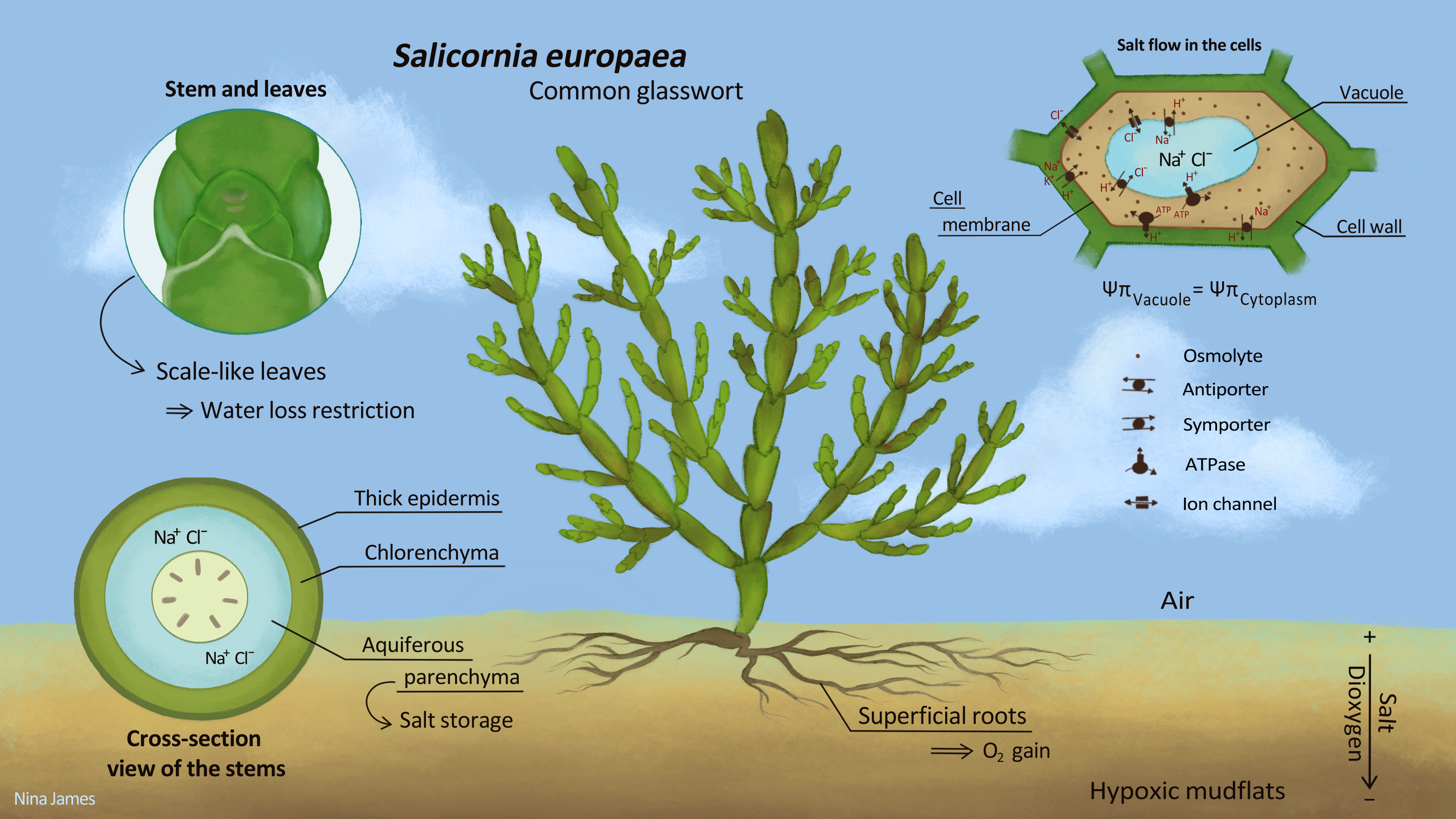
Various adaptations enabling the acquisition and conservation of mineral resources in a highly saline environment

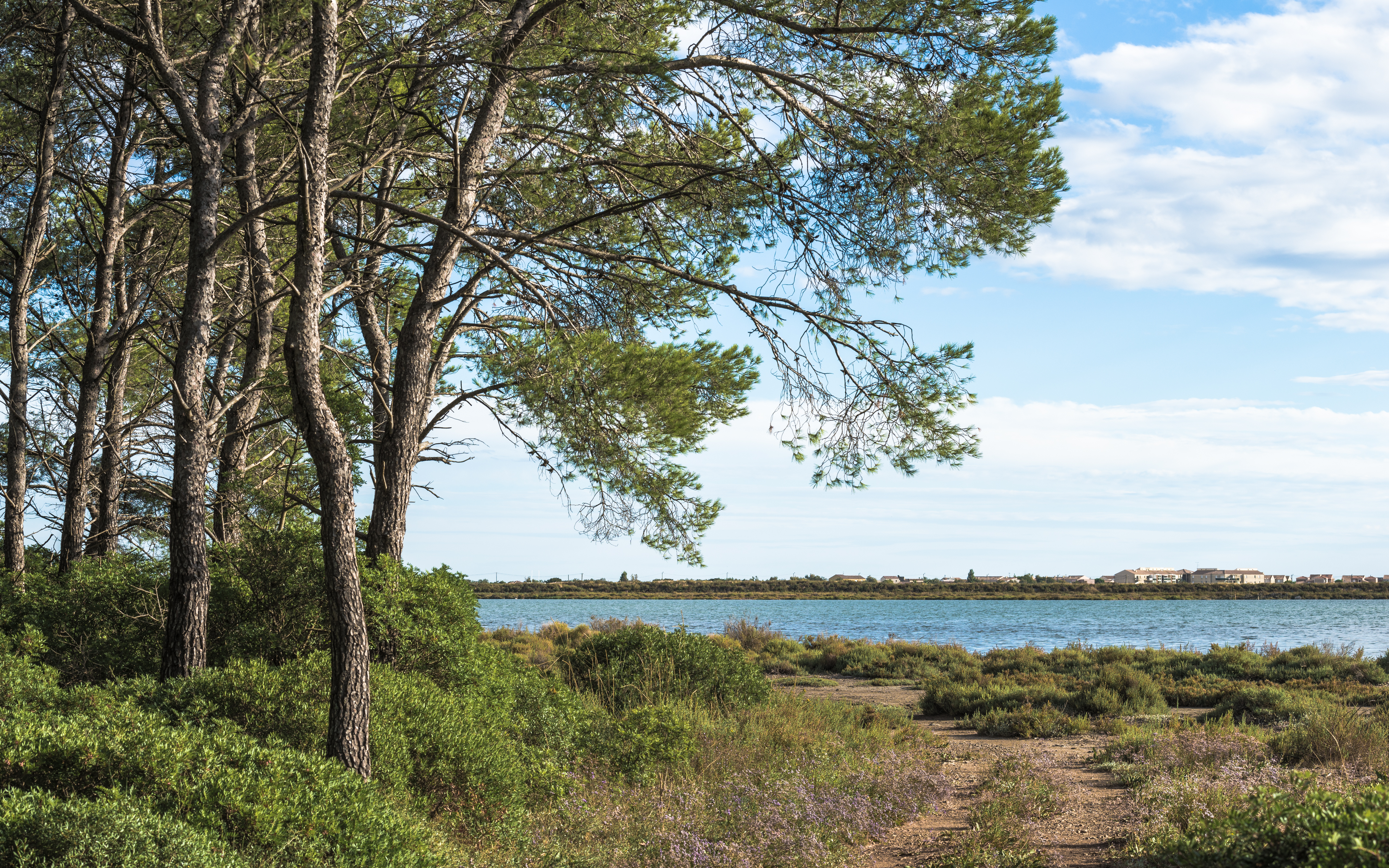
Habitat on the bank of the Étang d'Ingril, Hérault, France

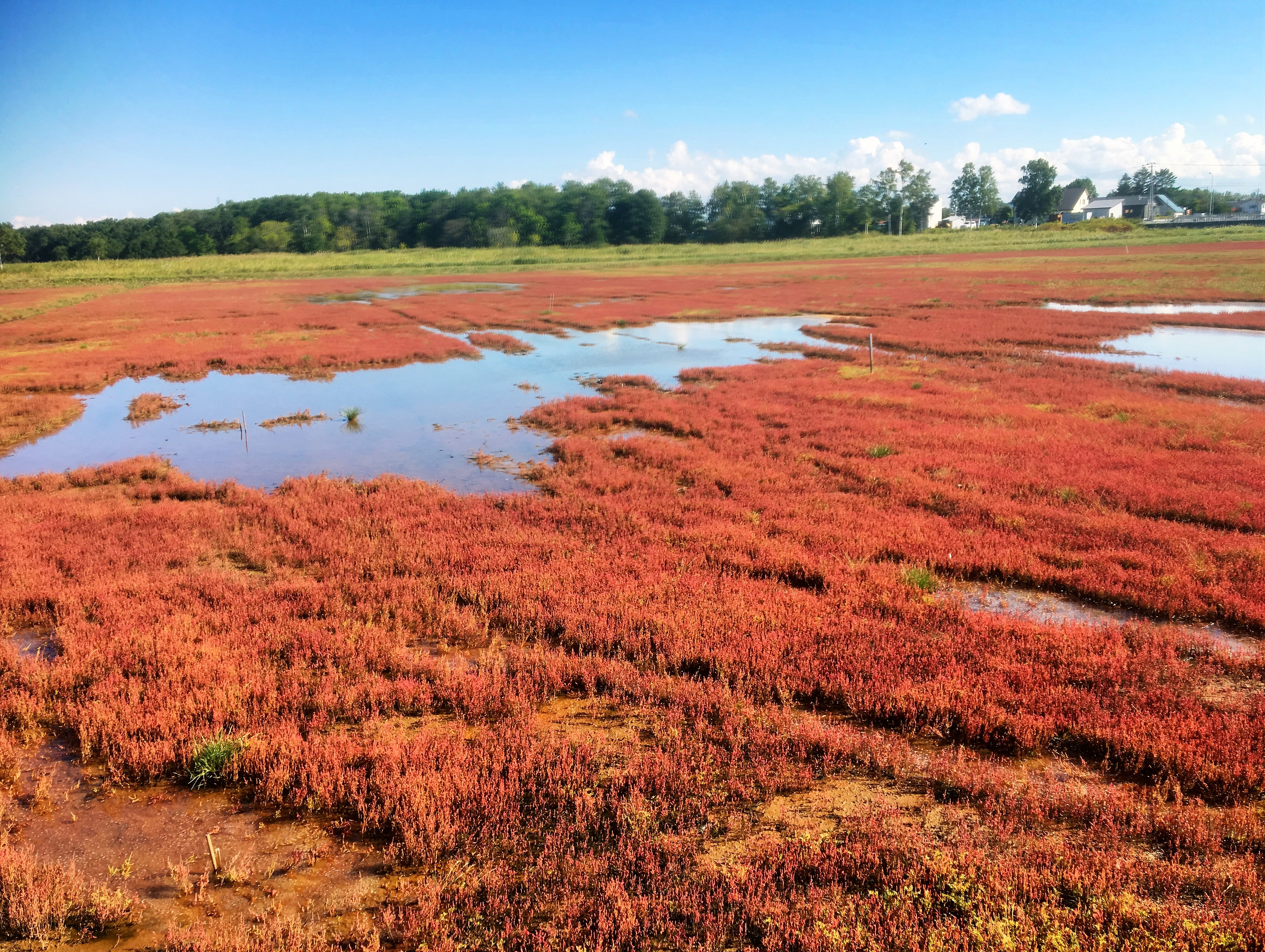
Salicornia europaea (autumn), Lake Notoro, Abashiri, Hokkaido, Japan

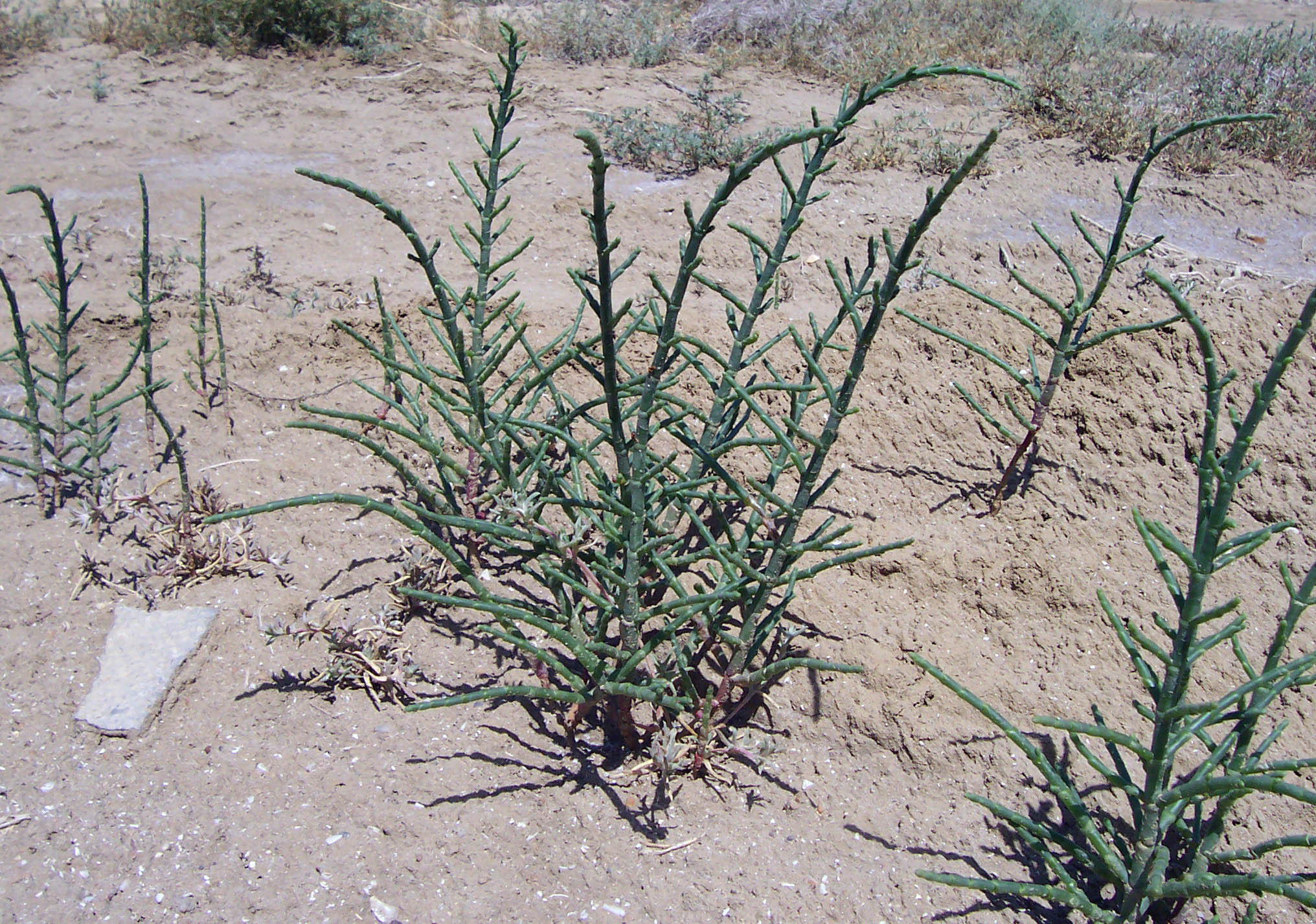
Salicornia europaea in Baku, Azerbaijan

== Cultivation ==
Salicornia prefers a light, sandy soil (or a well-drained soil) and a sunny position. Samphire can be planted out once the danger of frosts is past. Salicornia is best watered with a saline solution of 1 teaspoon of sea salt in 1 imp pt (0.57 L) of water. Salicornia grow best in 200 mM NaCl.

In the Northern Hemisphere, the harvesting of samphire shoots takes place from June to August. After that time shoots will become woody. Samphire should be treated as a slow-growing cut-and-come-again crop, with a month elapsing between each cut.

== Uses ==
The ashes of glasswort and saltwort plants (barilla) and of kelp were long used as a source of soda ash (mainly sodium carbonate) for glassmaking and soapmaking. The introduction of the Leblanc process for the industrial production of soda ash in the first half of the 19th century superseded the use of plant sources.

=== Culinary ===
S. europaea is edible, either raw or cooked. In the UK, it is one of several plants known as samphire; the term is believed to be a corruption of the French name, herbe de Saint-Pierre, which means "St. Peter's herb".

Samphire is usually cooked, then coated in butter or olive oil. Due to its high salt content, it must be cooked without any salt added, in plenty of water. After cooking, it resembles seaweed in colour, and the flavour and texture are like young spinach stems, asparagus, or artichoke. Samphire is often used as a suitably maritime accompaniment to fish or seafood.

=== Pharmacological research ===
In South Korea, Phyto Corporation has developed a technology of extracting low-sodium salt from Salicornia europaea, a salt-accumulating plant. The company claims the naturally-derived plant salt is effective in treating high blood pressure and fatty liver disease by reducing sodium intake. The company has also developed a desalted Salicornia powder containing antioxidative and antithrombus polyphenols, claimed to be effective in treating obesity and arteriosclerosis, as well as providing a means to help resolve global food shortages.

=== Environmental uses ===
Salicornia europaea is a new candidate plant species for using in effective phytoremediation of cadmium-contaminated saline soils.
