= Mount Ahoro =

Mountain in Hokkaido, Japan

- 阿幌岳
- Location within Japan

Highest point
- Elevation: 977 m (3,205 ft)
- Listing: Mountains and hills of Japan
- Coordinates: 43°31′02″N 144°04′15″E

Geography
- Location: Hokkaidō, Japan
- Parent range: Akan Volcanic Complex
- Topo map(s): Geographical Survey Institute 25000:1 木禽岳; 50000:1 斜里

Geology
- Rock age: Late Miocene-Pliocene
- Mountain type: volcanic
- Volcanic arc: Kurile arc

Mount Ahoro (阿幌岳, Ahoro-dake) is a mountain in Tsubetsu, Hokkaidō, Japan. It is the source of the Abashiri River. The mountain is made up of non-alkaline mafic volcanic rock that is 1.7 million to 7 million years old.
