= Branko Vukelić (spy) =

Yugoslav journalist, activist and Soviet spy (1904–1945)

- Бранко Вукелић
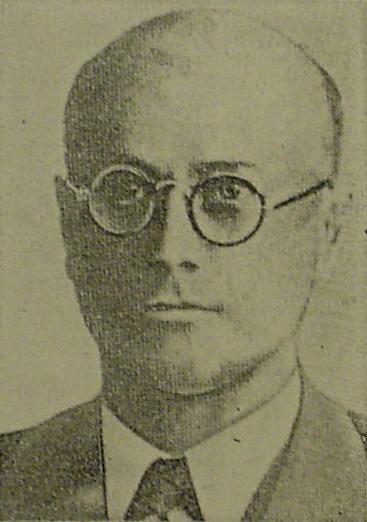
- Born: August 15, 1904; Osijek, Kingdom of Croatia-Slavonia, Austria-Hungary (now Croatia)
- Died: January 1945 (aged 41); Abashiri Prison, Abashiri, Japan
- Occupations: Journalist (Havas, Politika)
- Criminal charge: Espionage
- Criminal penalty: Death
- Criminal status: Died in prison
- Awards: Order of the Patriotic War
- Espionage activity
- Country: Japan
- Allegiance: Soviet Union
- Agency: Main Intelligence Directorate
- Service years: 1932–1945
- Codename: Gigolo

Branko Vukelić (Serbian Cyrillic: Бранко Вукелић; August 15, 1904 – January 1945) was a Yugoslav journalist, communist activist and Soviet spy who was based in Japan. Under journalistic cover as a reporter for Havas and Politika, he was one of the five members of Richard Sorge's group of spies operating in Japan from 1933 to 1941 on behalf of GRU, the Soviet military intelligence agency. After Sorge's arrest by the Japanese government, Vukelić was also arrested, and he died at Abashiri Prison in January 1945.

== Birth and early life ==
Vukelić was born in Osijek (then part of Austria-Hungary, now in Croatia) on August 15, 1904. His father Milivoj Vukelić was a descendent of a long line of military officers of Croatian origin from Senj on the Adriatic Coast who were serving in the Austrian army during the centuries-long Ottoman-Habsburg wars. Milivoj was himself an officer in the Austro-Hungarian army teaching the Croatian language and war history in military academies across Hungary, including in the town of Pécs where Branko spent most of his childhood. Branko's mother, Vilma Vukelić (née Miskolczy) was of Jewish origin. Her father, Julius Miskolczy was a wealthy businessman and prominent town figure in her native town of Osijek.

In her posthumously published memoirs, Vilma described how she grew up in a small provincial town to become an intellectually curious young woman with progressive views on women's rights to access higher education. Her overall progressive views on social justice informed her son's outlook on the imperative need for political engagement.

The Vukelić family moved to Zagreb (capital of today's Croatia) at the end of World War I where Branko soon became involved in progressive youth activism and eventually joined the communist movement. To protect him from increasing police surveillance, the family moved to Paris in 1926 where Branko, as well as his younger brother Slavko, renewed their communist activities and were spotted and recruited by Comintern agents to take part in Soviet intelligence operations. Branko's recruitment was finalized in the summer of 1932. He was given the code name Gigolo and instructed to travel without delay to Japan on a special secret assignment.

== Days in Japan ==
In 1933, Vukelić was sent to Japan as a Soviet counter-intelligence agent after being recruited by a Comintern member by the name of Olga. He worked along with Richard Sorge in a Soviet-backed spy network (known as Sorge ring), along with Max Clausen, Ozaki Hotsumi, and another Comintern agent, Miyagi Yotoku. Vukelić was employed by the French newspaper Havas, and Serbian daily Politika as a special correspondent.

Vukelić arrived in Yokohama, Japan on February 11, 1933, and reported to Richard Sorge, the network leader reporting to the Soviet Intelligence. Although this was a Soviet operation, Vukelić was led to believe that he was serving the Communist International.

Marriage between Branko, and his first wife, Edith dissolved in a series of affairs, and he married his Japanese language translator, Yoshiko Yamasaki. This marriage was considered a risk to the operation, and Sorge did not approve of it. Vukelić decided to get married without notifying Sorge. The ring leader sought advice from the Centre in Moscow, but the instructions were that Vukelić should stay in Japan and continue working for the network.

Vukelić's main activities in the network were primarily of gathering information. He gathered information from Japanese newspapers and magazines, as well as various embassy and journalist contacts. He was also in charge of the network's photographic work.

At one point, Vukelić was also tasked with influencing foreign journalists, mostly through Joseph Newman, a New York Herald Tribune journalist, in amplifying the perceived Japanese threat to the United States on Pacific, in an attempt to alleviate Japanese pressure on the Russian Far East. Vukelić's success in his task resulted in a July 1, 1939 New York Herald Tribune article titled "Japan Believed Still Aiming at South Sea Area", written by Newman.

Sorge's spy ring was eventually broken in 1941. Although Sorge tried his best to diminish Vukelić's and Miyagi's involvement, Vukelić was sentenced to life imprisonment along with Clausen. Branko was imprisoned in Sugamo, and was transferred to Abashiri Prison (Hokkaido, Japan) in July 1944. Vukelić did not survive the cold winter, and Yoshiko was informed of his death on January 15, 1945. Their son Hiroshi Yamasaki Vukelić lives in Japan and Belgrade today and works on Japanese-Serbian relations.

== Soviet recognition ==
Although the activities of Sorge ring members, including Branko Vukelić, were not recognized until the 1960s, Vukelić was posthumously awarded the Order of the Patriotic War (First Degree) on November 5, 1964 by decree of Praesidium of the Supreme Soviet.
