= Abashiri River =

River in Hokkaidō, Japan

Abashiri River 網走川
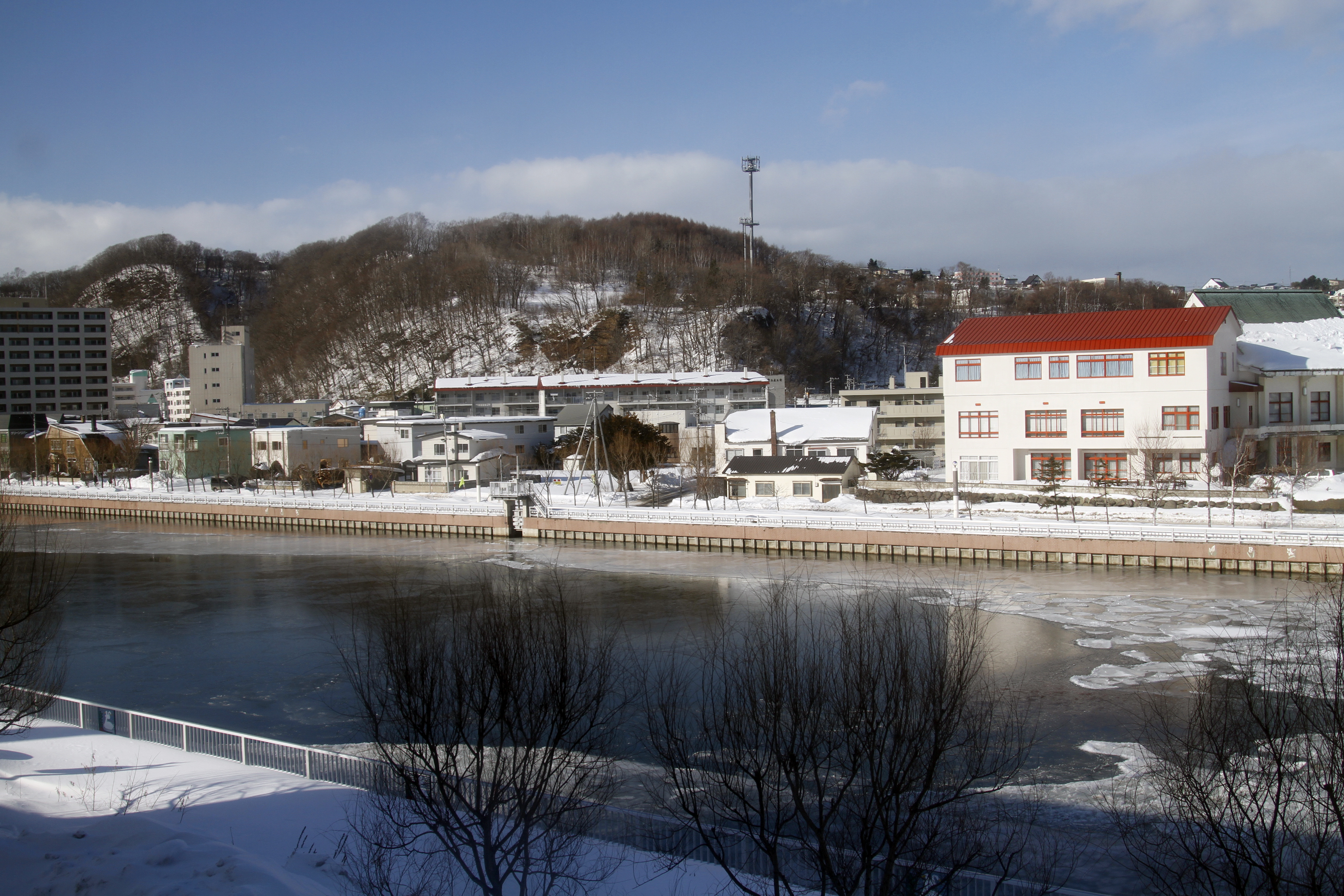

- Location within Japan
- Native name: Abashiri-gawa (Japanese)

Location
- Country: Japan
- Prefecture/Region: Hokkaido
- Subprefecture: Iburi
- District: Abashiri, Abashiri
- Municipalities: Bihoro, Ōzora, Tsubetsu

Physical characteristics
- Source: Mount Ahoro
  - location: Tsubetsu, Hokkaido, Japan
  - elevation: 978 m (3,209 ft)
- Mouth: Sea of Okhotsk
  - location: Abashiri, Hokkaido, Japan
  - coordinates: 44°1′30″N 144°16′30″E
  - elevation: 0 m (0 ft)
- Length: 115 km (71 mi)
- Basin size: 1,380 km^{2} (530 sq mi)
- Discharge
  - average: 13.96 m^{3}/s (493 cu ft/s)

Basin features
- Population: 49,000

Abashiri River (網走川, Abashiri-gawa) is a Class A river in Hokkaido, Japan.

== Etymology ==
The name Abashiri is theorised to come from the Ainu words a-pa-siri (lit. "we found land") or apa-siri ("land of entrance").

== History ==
Around 1,000 years ago, the Okhotsk culture settled the river basin and moved inland. Remains from the Jōmon period have been found on the bottom of Lake Abashiri. Pottery fragments from the Jōmon period have been found in caves in the area.

Flood control projects have been carried out in the basin since 1933.

== Basin area ==
The basin of the Abashiri River has an area of 1,380 km^{2} (530 sq mi). Approximately 49,000 people live in the basin area.

== Course ==
The Abashiri River rises in Tsubetsu on the slopes of Mount Ahoro of the Akan Volcanic Complex. The river leaves the mountains and is joined by the Tsubetsu River and Bihoro River before flowing into Lake Abashiri. The river exits the lake and flows into the Sea of Okhotsk at Abashiri.
