= Lake Saroma =

Coastal lagoon in Hokkaido, north Japan

- Saroma Lagoon
- サロマ湖 (Japanese)
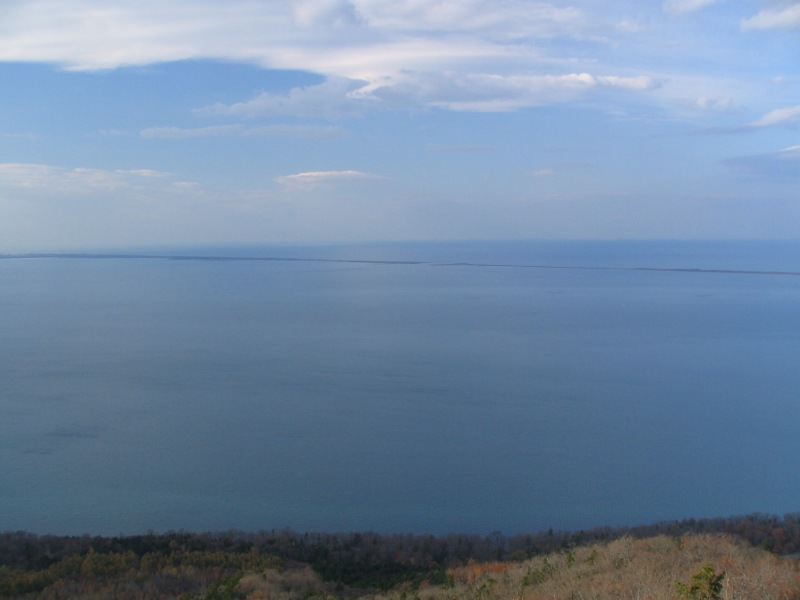
- Overlooking Lake Saroma

- Location within Japan
- Location: Okhotsk, Hokkaidō, Japan
- Coordinates: 44°10′N 143°43′E
- Type: Mesotrophic
- Primary outflows: Sea of Okhotsk
- Catchment area: 618 km^{2} (239 mi^{2})
- Basin countries: Japan
- Surface area: 150 km^{2} (37,000 acres)
- Average depth: 8.7 m (29 ft)
- Max. depth: 19.5 m (64 ft)
- Water volume: 1.3 km^{3} (0.31 mi^{3})
- Shore length^{1}: 82.4 km (51.2 mi)
- Surface elevation: 0 m (0 ft)
- Frozen: December to March
- Islands: none
- ^{1} Shore length is not a well-defined measure.

Lake Saroma (サロマ湖, Saroma-ko), also Saroma Lagoon, is a coastal lagoon (hence a body of brackish water) in Saroma, Kitami, and Yūbetsu. It is located in Abashiri Quasi-National Park. By area, the lake is the third largest in Japan and the largest in Hokkaidō.

The name comes from the Ainu place name Saruomahetsu, meaning "place of many Miscanthus reeds and rushes".

Another nearby coastal lagoon is Notoro Lagoon, about 15 km (9.3 mi) to the east.
