= Lake Tōfutsu =

Lake in Japan

Lake Tōfutsu 濤沸湖
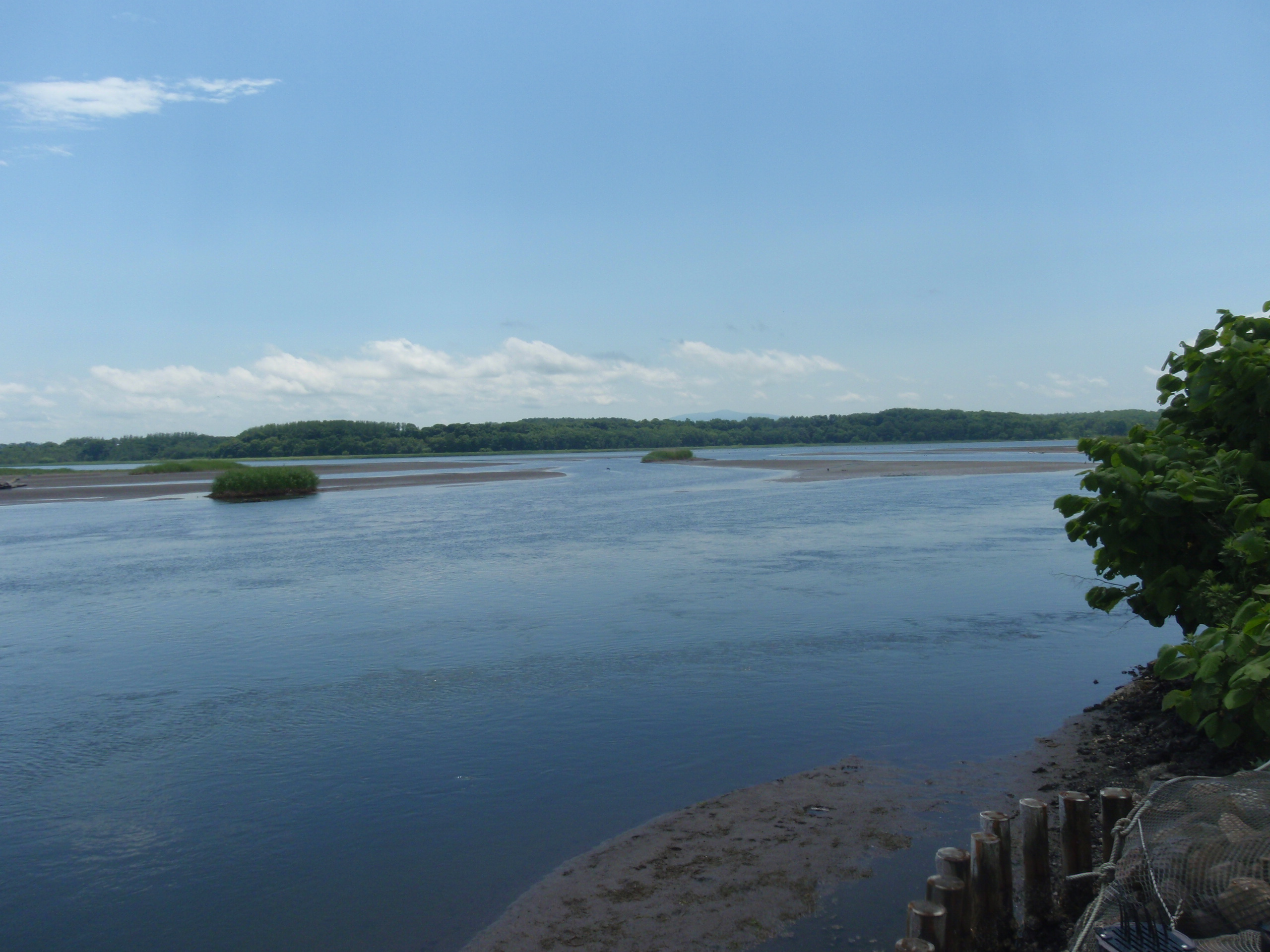
- Lake Tōfutsu

- Location within Hokkaido
- Location: Hokkaidō, Japan
- Coordinates: 43°56′N 144°24′E
- Surface area: 9 km^{2} (3.5 sq mi)
- Average depth: 0.7 m (2 ft 4 in)
- Max. depth: 2.5 m (8 ft 2 in)
- Shore length^{1}: 27 km (17 mi)
- Surface elevation: 1 m (3 ft 3 in)
- Settlements: Abashiri, Koshimizu

Ramsar Wetland
- Official name: Tofutsu-ko
- Designated: 8 November 2005
- Reference no.: 1557
- ^{1} Shore length is not a well-defined measure.

Lake Tōfutsu (濤沸湖, Tōfutsu-ko) is located in Abashiri and Koshimizu, Hokkaidō, Japan. It takes its name from the Ainu toputsu, or "mouth of the lake". A saline lagoon divided from the Sea of Okhotsk by sand dunes, Lake Tōfutsu provides an important habitat for wintering birds. In 2005 an area of 900 ha of wetlands was designated a Ramsar Site.

== See also ==
- Ramsar Sites in Japan
