= Lake Notoro =

Coastal lagoon in Hokkaido, north Japan

- Lake Notori; Notoro Lagoon
- 能取湖 (Japanese)
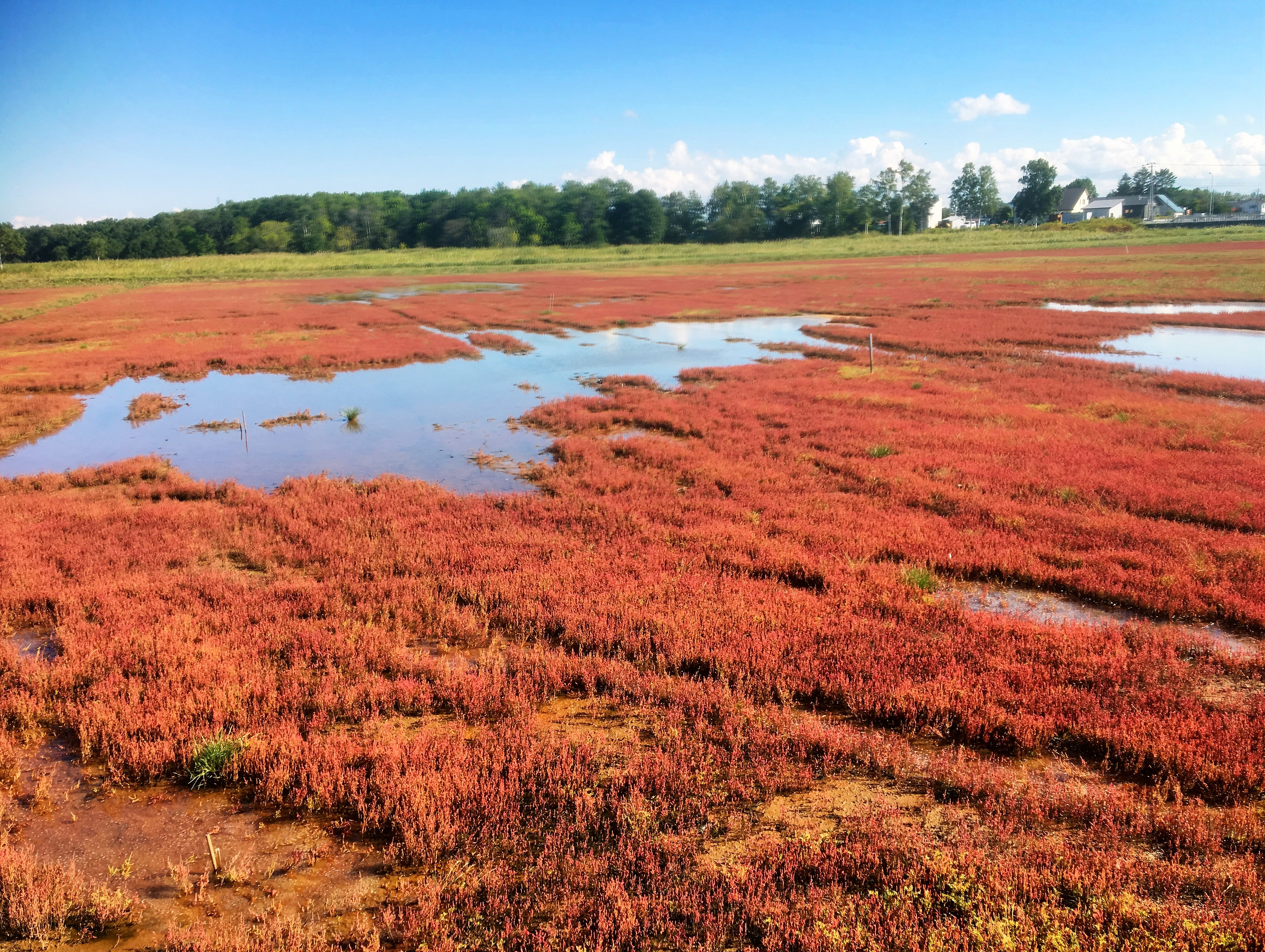
- Salicornia grass in the lake

- Location within Hokkaido
- Location: Hokkaidō, Japan
- Coordinates: 44°4′N 144°9′E
- Primary outflows: Sea of Okhotsk
- Surface area: 58 km^{2} (14,000 acres)
- Settlements: Abashiri

Lake Notoro (能取湖, Notoro-ko / Notori-ko), also Lake Notori or Notoro Lagoon, is a coastal lagoon by the northern shore of Abashiri, Hokkaidō, Japan. It is included in Abashiri Quasi-National Park.

It is the 13th-largest lake in Japan. It is about 2 km (1.2 mi) northwest of Lake Abashiri and 15 km (9.3 mi) east of Lake Saroma (also a coastal lagoon).
