= Abashiri =

Abashiri 網走市
- City
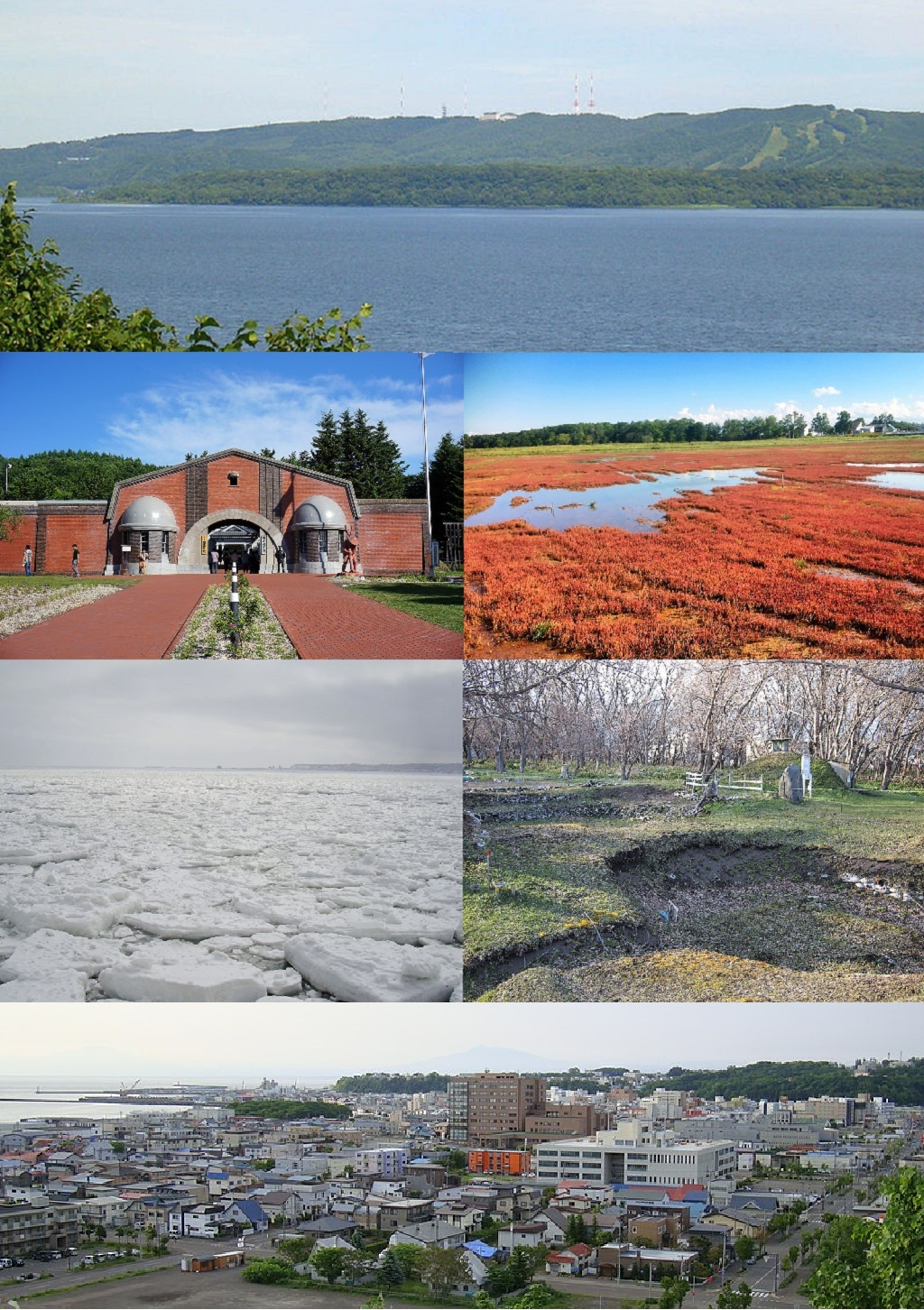
- Top: Panorama view of Mount Tento and Lake Abashiri, Second: Abashiri Prison Museum, View of salicornia europaea in Lake Notoro, Third: View of drift ice in Okhotsk Sea, Ainu Moyoro Midden Ruin Park, Bottom: Panorama view of downtown Abashiri (all item from left to right)

- Flag Emblem

- Location of Abashiri in Hokkaido (Okhotsk Subprefecture)

- Location in Japan
- Coordinates: 44°1′N 144°16′E
- Country: Japan
- Region: Hokkaido
- Prefecture: Hokkaido (Okhotsk Subprefecture)

Government
  - Mayor: Yōichi Mizutani (since December 2010)

Area
  - Total: 470.94 km^{2} (181.83 sq mi)

Population (February, 2020)
  - Total: 34,919
  - Density: 85.6/km^{2} (222/sq mi)
- Time zone: UTC+09:00 (JST)
- City hall address: Higashi Yon-chōme, Minami Roku-jō, Abashiri-shi, Hokkaidō; 093-8555
- Climate: Dfb
- Website: www.city.abashiri.hokkaido.jp
- Symbols
- Flower: Ezo murasaki-tsutsuji (Rhododendron dauricum)
- Mascot: Nipone (ニポネ)
- Tree: Katsura

Abashiri (網走市, Abashiri-shi; Japanese pronunciation: [ä̀.bä́.ɕì.ɾʲì, -ɕí.ɾʲí.ɕì]) is a city located in Okhotsk Subprefecture, Hokkaido, Japan.

Abashiri is known as the site of the Abashiri Prison, a Meiji-era facility used for the incarceration of political prisoners. The old prison has been turned into a museum, but the city's new maximum-security prison is still in use.

As of 2008, the city has an estimated population of 40,333 and a density of 85.6 persons per km^{2} (222 persons per sq. mi.). The total area is 470.94 km^{2} (181.83 sq mi).

It is the first Japanese city in alphabetical order.

== Etymology ==
There are various theories about the origin of the name 'Abashiri' and, because of that, the origin is unknown. All of those theories are based on the Kanji interpretation of the Ainu language. These are the following theories.

- Apasiri (アパシリ) which is translated as "leaking ground". The reason behind this is that there was a cave, and water drops were falling inside like raindrops.
- Cipasiri (チパシリ). The name is based on an Ainu legend of a bird.
- Chipasiri (チパシリ). There used to be a white rock in the shape of a person wearing a hat on the south bank of Lake Abashiri, and it is said that the Ainu worshiped it.

== History ==
The origin of the city's name is not known for certain, but it is agreed that it was derived from an Ainu word. A few among several of the candidates include apa-siri (leakage/ground) and ci-pa-sir ("the land we discovered").

- March 1872: Abashiri Village (アバシリ村) founded, being given the name of Abashiri District in Kitami Province.
- 1875: The village name is rewritten in kanji (網走村; same pronunciation).
- 1902: Abashiri Village, Kitami Town, Isani Village, and Nikuribake Village, all in Abashiri District, merged to form Abashiri Town.
- 1915: Notoro Village, Mokoto Village merged.
- 1921: Memanbetsu Village (later Memanbetsu Town, merged into Ōzora in 2006) split.
- 1931: Boundary with Memanbetsu Town modified.
- February 11, 1947: Higashimokoto Village (merged into Ōzora in 2006) split. Abashiri Town becomes Abashiri City. All of the territories of Ōzora used to be a part of Abashiri.

Following the 1945 Soviet invasion of South Sakhalin, Abashiri saw the resettlement of several Nivkh and Orok families from Karafuto; among them was Chiyo Nakamura (1906–1969), a Nivkh shaman from Poronaisk (Japanese: 敷香町, romanized: Shisuka-machi). By 2004, the Nivkh-Orok community in Abashiri had apparently vanished.

== Geography ==
Abashiri is located in the eastern part of Okhotsk Subprefecture, about 50 kilometers east of Kitami. There are no tall mountains, but there are many hills. The Abashiri River flows through the city and there are three lakes (Lake Abashiri, Lake Notoro and Lake Tōfutsu) in the city as well. These lakes and Mount Tento belong to Abashiri Quasi-National Park.

== Climate ==
The climate is humid continental with warm summer (Köppen: Dfb) as much of Hokkaido, similar to the south coast of New England. Despite its reputation for extreme cold, Abashiri is not actually the coldest major town in Japan, being less cold in the winter than Obihiro and warmer in summer than Nemuro or Kushiro. Abashiri receives less precipitation than any other city in Japan because its location on the drift ice-affected Sea of Okhotsk, which, however, causes Abashiri to receive less sunshine than the northeast coast since winter snowfall is heavier and fog less confined to the summer months when the Oyashio Current is strongest. During the winter, when Lake Abashiri freezes over, fog becomes a common occurrence. Also, the harbor closes when it ices over.

Climate data for Abashiri (elevation 37.6 m, 1991–2020 normals, extremes 1889–present)
Month	Jan	Feb	Mar	Apr	May	Jun	Jul	Aug	Sep	Oct	Nov	Dec	Year
Record high °C (°F)	11.8 (53.2)	14.1 (57.4)	19.7 (67.5)	31.9 (89.4)	35.4 (95.7)	34.0 (93.2)	37.0 (98.6)	37.6 (99.7)	32.8 (91.0)	30.4 (86.7)	21.7 (71.1)	17.6 (63.7)	37.6 (99.7)
Mean maximum °C (°F)	4.3 (39.7)	6.2 (43.2)	11.7 (53.1)	21.8 (71.2)	27.2 (81.0)	27.7 (81.9)	31.0 (87.8)	31.7 (89.1)	28.5 (83.3)	22.3 (72.1)	17.0 (62.6)	8.3 (46.9)	33.2 (91.8)
Mean daily maximum °C (°F)	−2.2 (28.0)	−2.0 (28.4)	2.3 (36.1)	9.1 (48.4)	14.6 (58.3)	17.7 (63.9)	21.4 (70.5)	23.3 (73.9)	20.7 (69.3)	15.0 (59.0)	7.6 (45.7)	0.7 (33.3)	10.7 (51.3)
Daily mean °C (°F)	−5.1 (22.8)	−5.4 (22.3)	−1.3 (29.7)	4.5 (40.1)	9.8 (49.6)	13.5 (56.3)	17.6 (63.7)	19.6 (67.3)	16.8 (62.2)	10.9 (51.6)	4.0 (39.2)	−2.4 (27.7)	6.9 (44.4)
Mean daily minimum °C (°F)	−8.9 (16.0)	−9.6 (14.7)	−4.9 (23.2)	0.6 (33.1)	5.8 (42.4)	10.2 (50.4)	14.6 (58.3)	16.6 (61.9)	13.4 (56.1)	7.0 (44.6)	0.4 (32.7)	−6.0 (21.2)	3.3 (37.9)
Mean minimum °C (°F)	−15.2 (4.6)	−15.8 (3.6)	−11.7 (10.9)	−4.5 (23.9)	0.3 (32.5)	5.1 (41.2)	9.7 (49.5)	12.5 (54.5)	8.3 (46.9)	1.2 (34.2)	−5.8 (21.6)	−11.9 (10.6)	−16.5 (2.3)
Record low °C (°F)	−29.2 (−20.6)	−25.7 (−14.3)	−23.2 (−9.8)	−12.4 (9.7)	−5.4 (22.3)	0.1 (32.2)	2.8 (37.0)	4.1 (39.4)	3.3 (37.9)	−4.6 (23.7)	−11.3 (11.7)	−18.0 (−0.4)	−29.2 (−20.6)
Average precipitation mm (inches)	53.8 (2.12)	41.9 (1.65)	39.3 (1.55)	51.2 (2.02)	64.1 (2.52)	68.1 (2.68)	85.8 (3.38)	115.3 (4.54)	115.0 (4.53)	88.2 (3.47)	58.1 (2.29)	63.6 (2.50)	844.2 (33.24)
Average snowfall cm (inches)	90 (35)	69 (27)	52 (20)	15 (5.9)	1 (0.4)	0 (0)	0 (0)	0 (0)	0 (0)	0 (0)	13 (5.1)	71 (28)	312 (123)
Average precipitation days (≥ 0.5 mm)	17.8	14.0	12.2	11.6	12.0	11.0	11.0	12.1	12.7	12.2	13.4	15.1	155.0
Average snowy days	27.0	23.5	22.2	15.2	4.1	0.0	0.0	0.0	0.0	1.9	14.5	24.1	132.1
Average relative humidity (%)	72	73	70	68	73	80	82	81	76	71	68	69	74
Mean monthly sunshine hours	111.5	137.9	172.4	178.6	187.1	172.2	167.6	163.9	162.9	157.4	121.2	117.4	1,850
Source: Japan Meteorological Agency (1991–2020 normals, extremes 1889–present)

== Demographics ==
Per Japanese census data, the population of Abashiri has declined in recent decades.

Historical population
Year	Pop.	±%
1970	43,904	—
1980	44,777	+2.0%
1990	44,416	−0.8%
2000	43,395	−2.3%
2010	40,998	−5.5%
2020	35,759	−12.8%

== Economy ==
Because of its short 130-day growing season, the crops in the region, such as oats, potatoes, and beans, are required to be hardy. Hay is also grown for local cows, horses, and sheep. The sea is an important part of the community as well as the economy, as fishing, oysters, and seaweed are important means of livelihood.

== Transportation ==
=== Air ===
Memanbetsu Airport is located in nearby Ōzora.

=== Rail ===
Abashiri is an important local port city and railway terminal (Abashiri Station).

- JR Hokkaido Sekihoku Main Line: Yobito – Abashiri
- JR Hokkaido Senmō Main Line: Abashiri – Katsuradai – Masuura – Mokoto – Kitahama

== Education ==
=== Universities ===
- Tokyo University of Agriculture, Okhotsk campus

=== High schools ===
- Hokkaido Abashiri Minamigaoka High School
- Hokkaido Abashiri Keiyo High School

== Sister cities ==
Port Alberni, British Columbia, Canada – Each year many students participate in student exchange programs between the two cities.

== Sights ==
Hokkaido has a brewery called Abashiri which sells a range of beers, including Bilk, a blend of beer and milk. Abashiri is also home to a flower garden with a wide range of flowers.

In the winter, tourists visit the city to watch the drift ice.

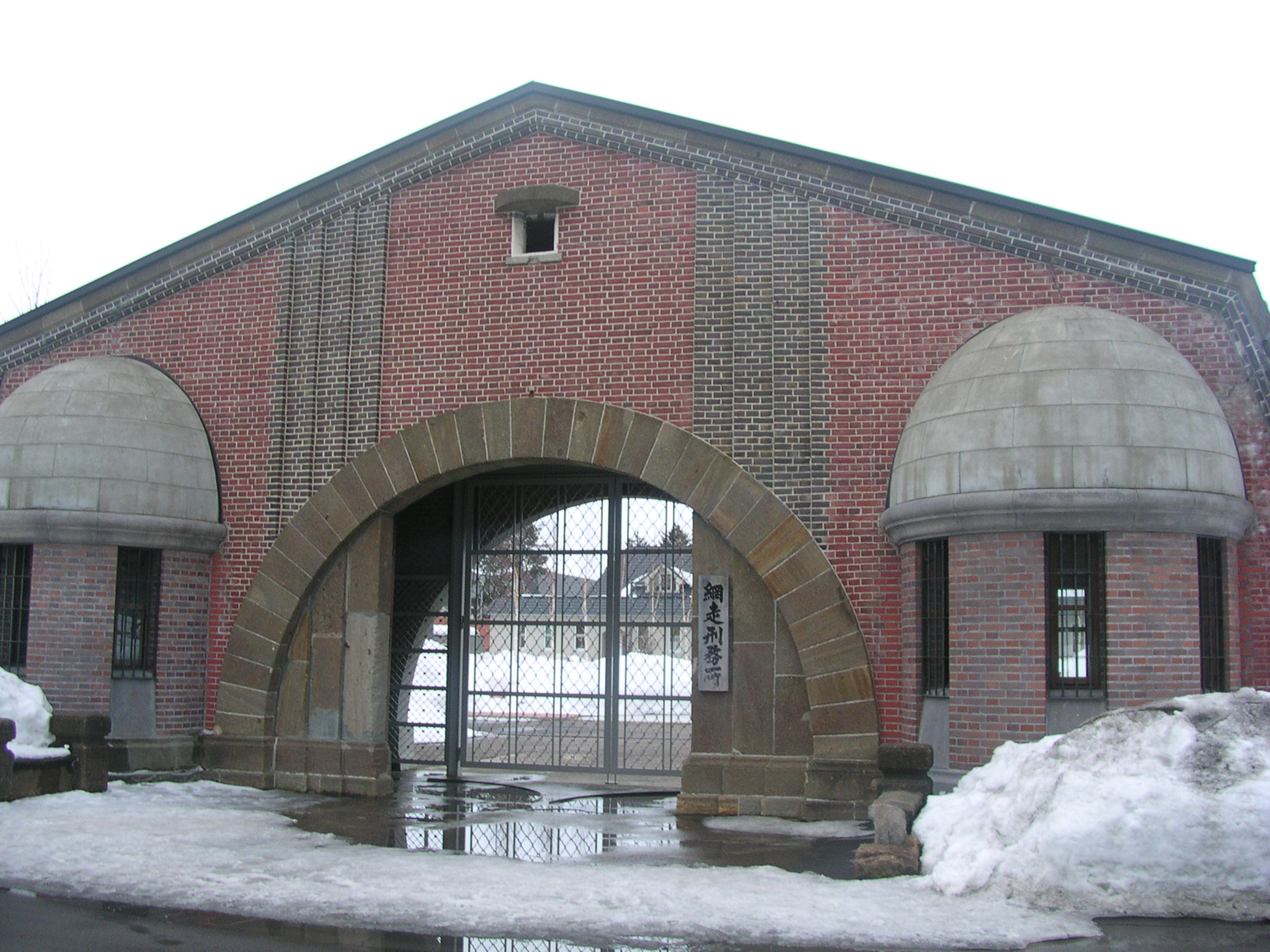
Abashiri Prison

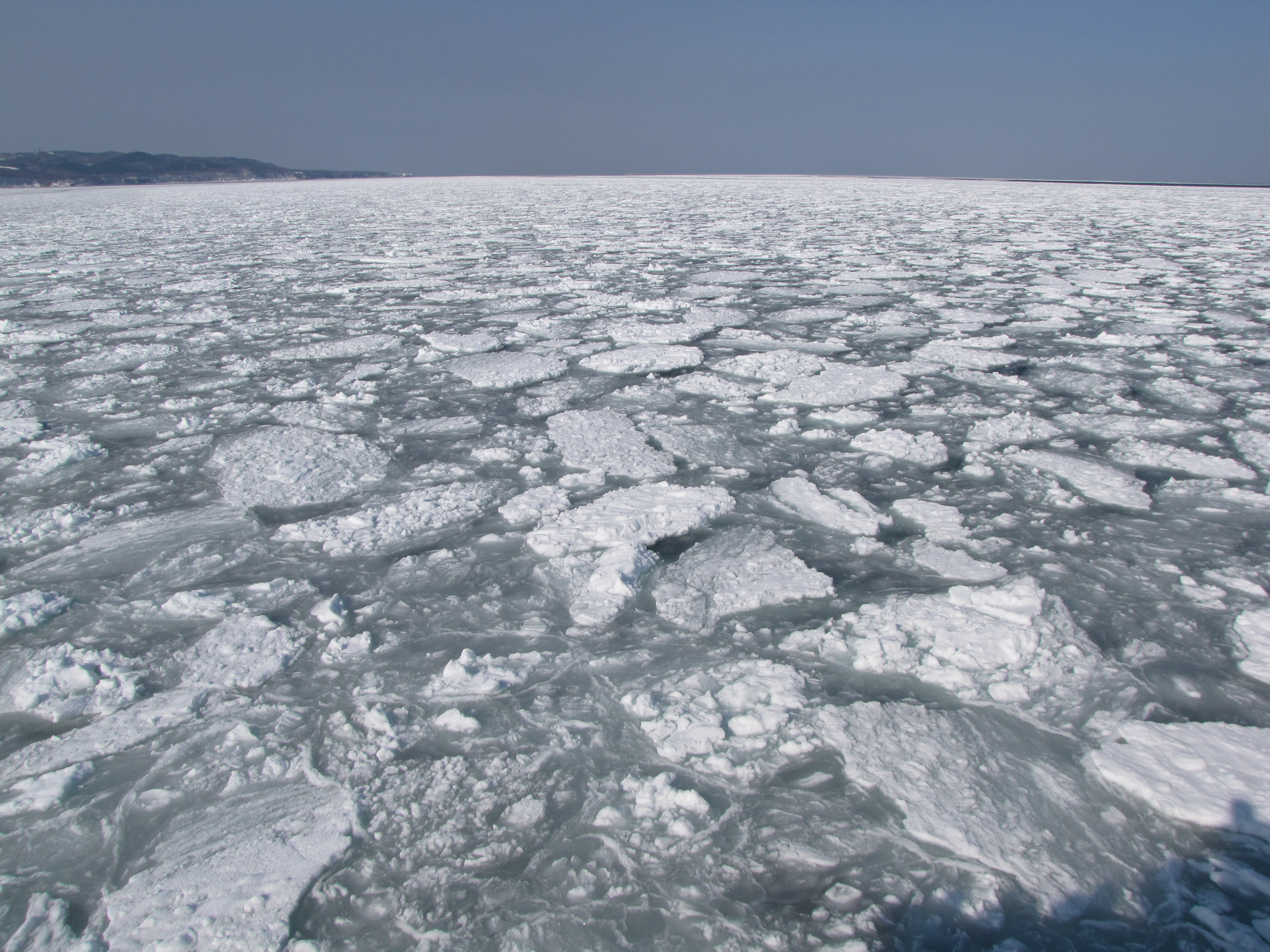
Drift ice off Abashiri

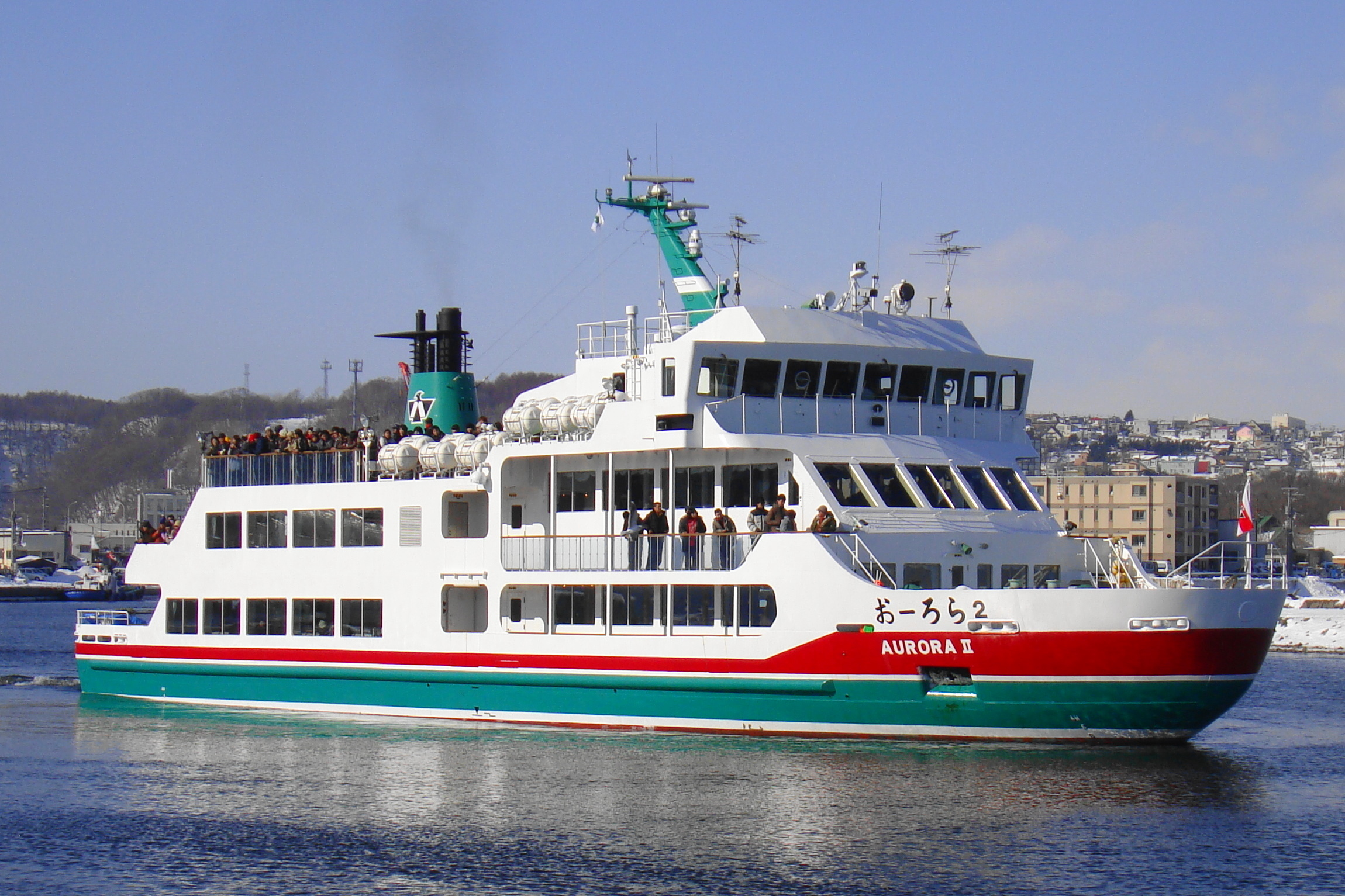
Abashiri's sightseeing ship & icebreaker Aurora II

=== Museums ===
- Okhost Ryuhyo Museum

== Culture ==
=== Mascot ===
Abashiri's mascot is Nipone (ニポネ). She is a plankton who has the ability to gain flight with her cape. Her job is to protect everyone from criminal activities (such as terrorism and corruption), outbreak of warfare, natural disasters, health crisis (such as disease outbreaks) or anything that pose a risk to everyone's lives. She usually rests with her "nipopo" (totem pole) helmet and loves ingredients produced from the city. Her birthday is November 22, 2012.
