= Saroma, Hokkaido =

Saroma 佐呂間町
- Town
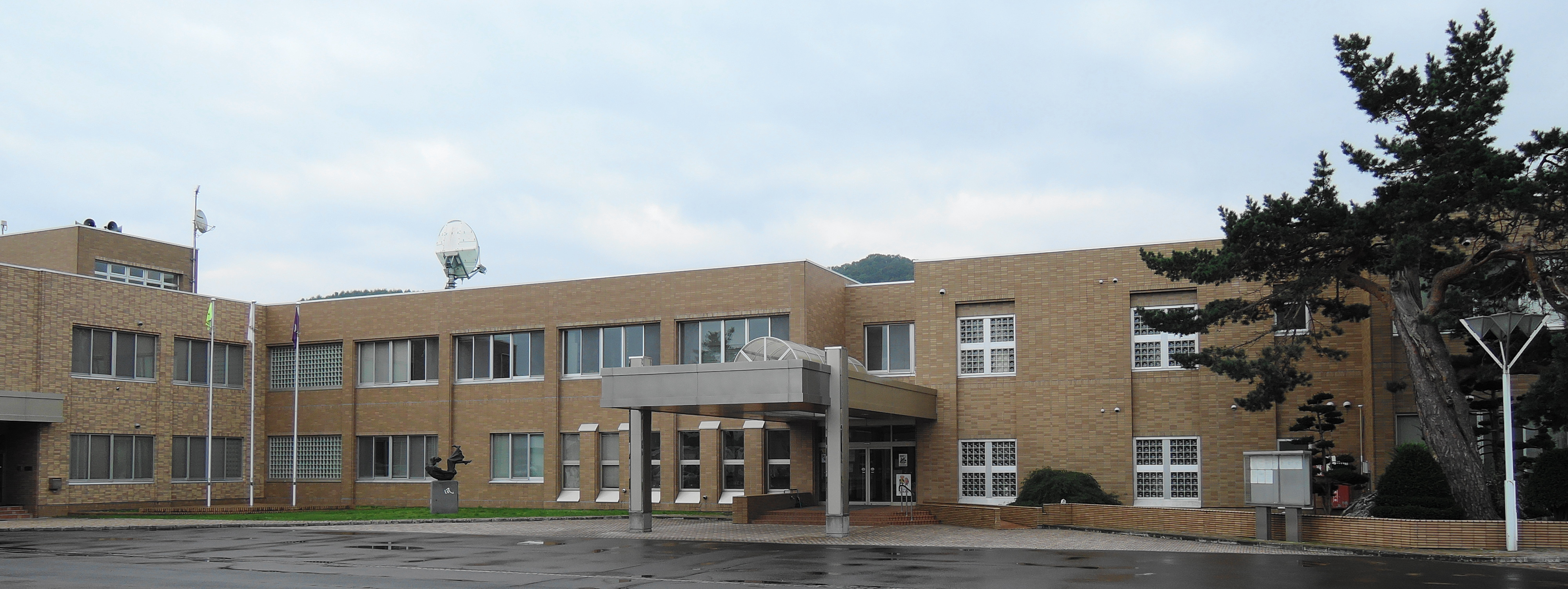
- Saroma Town Hall

- Flag Seal

- Location of Saroma in Hokkaido (Okhotsk Subprefecture)

- Location in Japan
- Coordinates: 44°00′58″N 143°46′46″E
- Country: Japan
- Region: Hokkaido
- Prefecture: Hokkaido (Okhotsk Subprefecture)
- District: Tokoro

Government
  - Mayor: Harutomo Takeda

Area
  - Total: 404.99 km^{2} (156.37 sq mi)

Population (January, 2013)
  - Total: 5,617
  - Density: 13.87/km^{2} (35.92/sq mi)
- Time zone: UTC+09:00 (JST)
- City hall address: 3-1, Eidai-chō, Saroma-chō, Tokoro-gun, Hokkaidō; 093-0502
- Climate: Dfb
- Website: www.town.saroma.hokkaido.jp
- Symbols
- Flower: Rhododendron dauricum (Purple Azalea)
- Mascot: Soluckky (そらっきー)
- Tree: Tilia maximowicziana Shirasawa (Linden)

Saroma (佐呂間町, Saroma-chō) is a town in the Okhotsk Subprefecture, Hokkaido, Japan.

== Etymology ==
The name Saroma comes from the Ainu place name Saro-oma-pet, meaning place of many miscanthus reeds.

== Population ==
As of January, 2013, the town has a population of 5,617 and a population density of 14 persons per km^{2}. The total area is 404.99 km^{2}.

== History ==
Saroma was established in 1894 as part of the Japanese expansion into Hokkaido. The first permanent Japanese settler was Jingorou Suzuki, who homesteaded near present-day Hamasaroma, on Saroma Lake. The following decade saw the establishment of a city hall, a railroad, agricultural zoning, and the building of roads. In 1914, the Saroma area was established as Tofutsu Village. The name changed the next year to Saroma Village.

In the early Shōwa period (1930s), additional railroad connections were built to Saroma and several hundred households moved to the area. In 1948, Saroma High School was opened as a night school. 1953 saw Saroma become an official town, with the establishment of a town song and official seal. In 1955, the population reached 15,656. The following year, Saroma merged with neighboring Wakasa Village.

The 1960s and 70s saw greater development in Saroma, with the beginning of full-time operation at Saroma High School in 1962 and construction of a proper road over Rukushi Pass to Kitami in 1968. In 1972, the Morinaga Corporation opened a butter factory in central Saroma. The population in 1975 was 9,307.

In 1980, Saroma and the city of Palmer, Alaska became official sister cities. With the privatization of Japan Railways in 1987, the Yūmō Line through Saroma was closed, and replaced with a bus service paralleling the former train routes. The following year the Saroma Tunnel was opened through Rukushi pass, allowing year-round access to the nearby city of Kitami. 1994 marked the 100th anniversary of the town, which was celebrated with the building of a memorial park and park golf course.

On November 7, 2006, a tornado struck the town, killing nine people and injuring twenty-six more. Floods also hit the town the same year, causing widespread damage but no injuries. Saroma gained easier access to neighboring communities with a new tunnel to Engaru completed in 2002, and in 2009 with the 4.1 km New Saroma Tunnel to Kitami.

== Climate ==
The areas of the town near Lake Saroma do not experience a large temperature range compared to inland areas, which have colder winters and hotter summers.

Saroma's record of 39.5 °C (103.1 °F) on 26 May 2019 is both Japan's highest temperature recorded in May and the highest temperature recorded in Hokkaido.

Saroma Town

Climate chart (precipitation, max. and min. temperature)
J	F	M	A	M	J	J	A	S	O	N	D
42 −3 −16	32 −3 −17	34 1 −11	45 10 −2	61 16 4	58 19 9	85 23 14	113 25 15	125 20 10	74 15 3	55 7 −3	47 0 −11
- █ Average max. and min. temperatures in °C
- █ Precipitation totals in mm
Imperial conversion
J	F	M	A	M	J	J	A	S	O	N	D
1.7 26 2	1.3 27 2	1.3 35 13	1.8 49 29	2.4 61 39	2.3 66 47	3.3 73 56	4.4 76 59	4.9 69 50	2.9 58 37	2.2 44 26	1.9 32 13
- █ Average max. and min. temperatures in °F
- █ Precipitation totals in inches

Climate data for Saroma, 1991–2020 normals, extremes 1976–present
Month	Jan	Feb	Mar	Apr	May	Jun	Jul	Aug	Sep	Oct	Nov	Dec	Year
Record high °C (°F)	9.9 (49.8)	11.7 (53.1)	17.1 (62.8)	30.9 (87.6)	39.5 (103.1)	34.4 (93.9)	36.7 (98.1)	36.8 (98.2)	33.4 (92.1)	28.2 (82.8)	22.0 (71.6)	16.2 (61.2)	39.5 (103.1)
Mean daily maximum °C (°F)	−2.6 (27.3)	−2.2 (28.0)	2.5 (36.5)	10.2 (50.4)	16.9 (62.4)	20.2 (68.4)	23.9 (75.0)	24.9 (76.8)	21.6 (70.9)	15.3 (59.5)	7.5 (45.5)	0.1 (32.2)	11.5 (52.7)
Daily mean °C (°F)	−8.5 (16.7)	−8.4 (16.9)	−2.9 (26.8)	4.2 (39.6)	10.3 (50.5)	14.2 (57.6)	18.2 (64.8)	19.4 (66.9)	15.6 (60.1)	9.0 (48.2)	2.1 (35.8)	−5.4 (22.3)	5.6 (42.2)
Mean daily minimum °C (°F)	−15.6 (3.9)	−16.3 (2.7)	−9.5 (14.9)	−1.8 (28.8)	3.8 (38.8)	8.9 (48.0)	13.6 (56.5)	14.8 (58.6)	10.1 (50.2)	2.9 (37.2)	−3.2 (26.2)	−11.7 (10.9)	−0.3 (31.4)
Record low °C (°F)	−34.3 (−29.7)	−35.4 (−31.7)	−30.8 (−23.4)	−18.1 (−0.6)	−5.7 (21.7)	−2.1 (28.2)	3.5 (38.3)	4.5 (40.1)	−0.5 (31.1)	−5.6 (21.9)	−16.7 (1.9)	−27.5 (−17.5)	−35.4 (−31.7)
Average precipitation mm (inches)	39.3 (1.55)	27.5 (1.08)	28.3 (1.11)	42.0 (1.65)	57.6 (2.27)	69.7 (2.74)	109.3 (4.30)	138.1 (5.44)	123.5 (4.86)	90.2 (3.55)	52.5 (2.07)	52.1 (2.05)	830.1 (32.67)
Average snowfall cm (inches)	150 (59)	124 (49)	103 (41)	34 (13)	3 (1.2)	0 (0)	0 (0)	0 (0)	0 (0)	1 (0.4)	23 (9.1)	121 (48)	559 (220.7)
Average precipitation days (≥ 1.0 mm)	10.9	8.8	9.4	9.1	10.0	10.5	11.7	12.1	11.5	10.1	9.8	10.4	124.3
Average snowy days (≥ 1 cm)	10.3	9.2	7.5	2.3	0.3	0	0	0	0	0	1.6	8.1	39.3
Mean monthly sunshine hours	90.6	110.2	149.6	163.6	176.2	160.3	158.0	152.5	154.8	149.0	117.1	96.8	1,678.5
Source 1: JMA
Source 2: JMA

== Healthcare ==
Saroma's primary healthcare provider is Clinic Saroma, a limited service healthcare facility run by the Sendai-based Keishōkai Medical Corporation. The clinic opened in April 2013 in the facility of the former Saroma Kōsei Clinic, while construction of a new adjacent replacement facility beginning soon after. This new modern facility opened in April 2015 and features 19 hospital beds, daily outpatient services, a full MRI machine.

Prior to the opening of newly constructed Clinic Saroma facility, many Saroma residents relied healthcare facilities in Engaru and Kitami due to a lack of healthcare facilities in Saroma. The 2010s saw the availability of healthcare in Saroma steadily decrease. The town previously had a full hospital managed by Kōsei Hospitals of Japan Agriculture, but in 2012 the facility was downgraded to a clinic. Oda Clinic also closed at the same time, leaving Saroma with no full care facility.

Saroma Town provides free subsidized healthcare for all school age children in the town.

== Education ==
There are five public schools in Saroma.

Saroma Town Board of Education manages education in town from preschool through compulsory education grades 1–9. The superintendent is Kenichi Kagawa. Saroma High School (北海道佐呂間高等学校) (grades 10–12) is managed by Hokkaido Prefecture.

Municipal schools in Saroma:

- Hamasaroma Elementary School (浜佐呂間小学校)
- Saroma Elementary School (佐呂間小学校)
- Saroma Junior High School (佐呂間中学校)
- Wakasa Elementary School (若佐小学校)

There are also three preschools, one associated with each of the elementary schools.

== Mascot ==
Momo-chan, the town's mascot

Saroma's mascot is Momo-chan (ももちゃん). She is a cheerful pumpkin. She carries a scallop shell all the time as good luck. She is unveiled in 1994.

== International relations ==
- Palmer, Alaska, United States

On October 28, 1980, Saroma and Palmer agreed to a bilateral sister relationship to promote cultural exchange and support a home-stay program for their residents. The relationship began with a friendship formed between Mr. Mutsuhiro Ishiguro, an English teacher at Saroma High School, and Palmer resident Edward Holmes. They met over their ham radios, and over time formed a friendship. Mr. Holmes eventually visited Saroma, which then led to a delegation from Saroma to Palmer, where they signed the sister city accords. Since that time, additional relationships have formed under the auspices of the town connection.

- Saroma High School with Palmer High School, established 1991
- Saroma Elementary School with Pioneer Peak Elementary, established 1991
- Saroma Junior High School with Palmer Junior Middle School and Colony Middle School, established 2003
- Saroma Elementary School with Sherrod Elementary School, established 2018
- Saroma Christian Church with Palmer Presbyterian Church

The sister city relationship is managed by the Palmer Saroma Kai (パーマ・サロマ会).
