= Lake Abashiri =

Lake in Hokkaidō, Japan

Lake Abashiri 網走湖
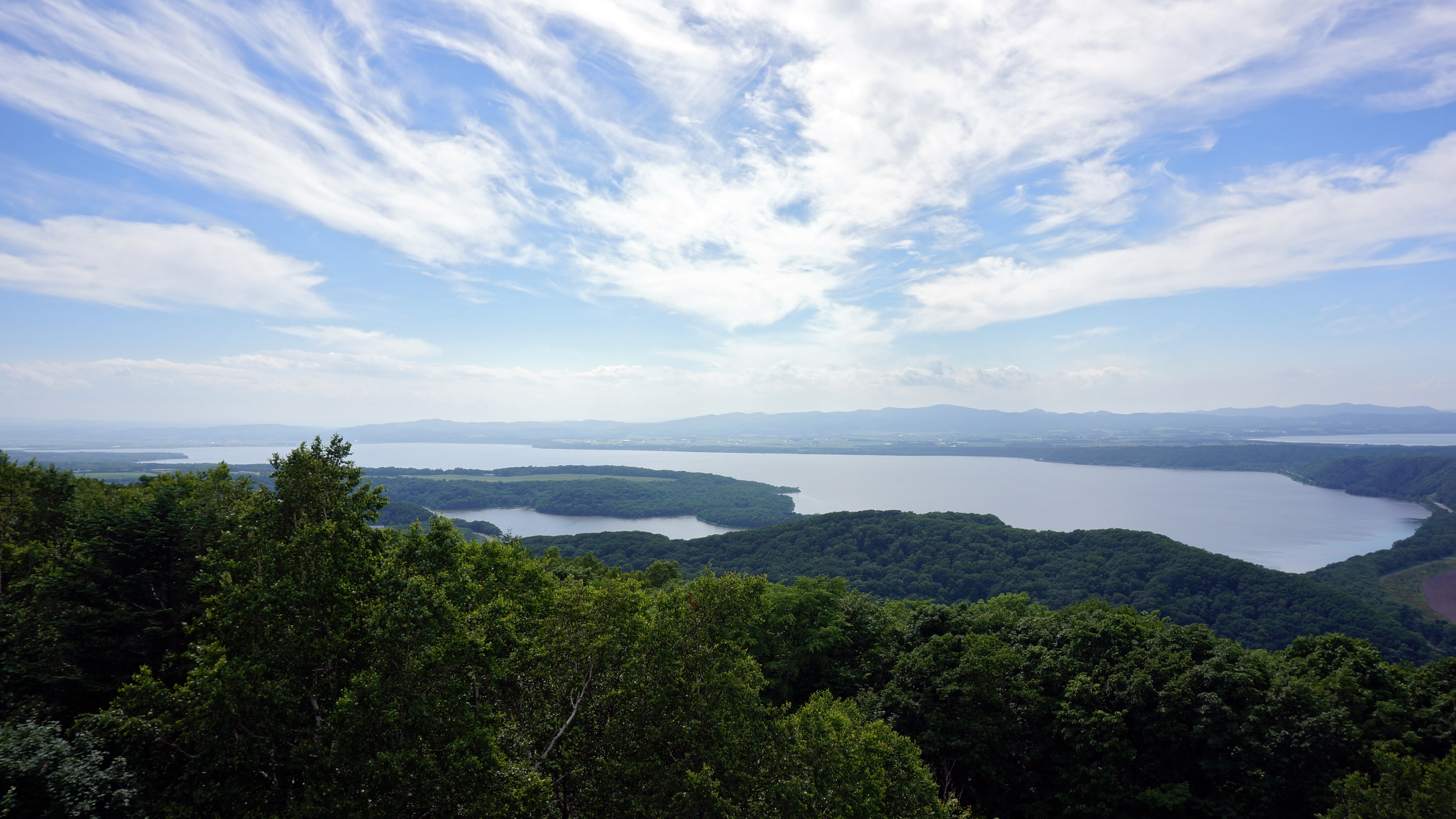
- A view from Mount Tento (July 2013)

- Location within Japan
- Location: Okhotsk Subprefecture, Hokkaido, Japan
- Coordinates: 43°58′N 144°10′E
- Lake type: Dimictic
- Primary inflows: Abashiri River and Memanbetsu River
- Primary outflows: Abashiri River
- Catchment area: 1,380 km^{2} (530 mi^{2})
- Basin countries: Japan
- Surface area: 33 km^{2} (8,200 acres)
- Average depth: 7.2 m (24 ft)
- Max. depth: 16.1 m (53 ft)
- Water volume: 0.2327 km^{3} (0.0558 mi^{3})
- Residence time: 0.43 years
- Shore length^{1}: 44 km (27 mi)
- Surface elevation: 0.4 m (1.3 ft)
- Frozen: December to April
- Islands: none
- Settlements: Abashiri
- ^{1} Shore length is not a well-defined measure.

Lake Abashiri (網走湖, Abashiri-ko) is a meromictic lake in Abashiri, Hokkaido, Japan. It is located in Abashiri Quasi-National Park. The Abashiri and Memanbetsu Rivers flow into the lake. Water exits the lake through the Abashiri River again and flows 7 kilometres (4.3 mi) to the Sea of Okhotsk.

== History and formation ==
From core samples taken from the lake bed, the lake basin appears to have first formed some 20,000 years ago during the last period of glaciation. During the last 6000 years, the Abashiri River carved out the lake bed. Artifacts from the Jōmon period have been found in the area around the Memanbetsu River. In modern times, the course of the Abashiri River has been straightened to provide for irrigation resulting in a serious siltation problem for the lake.

== Freezing and salinity ==
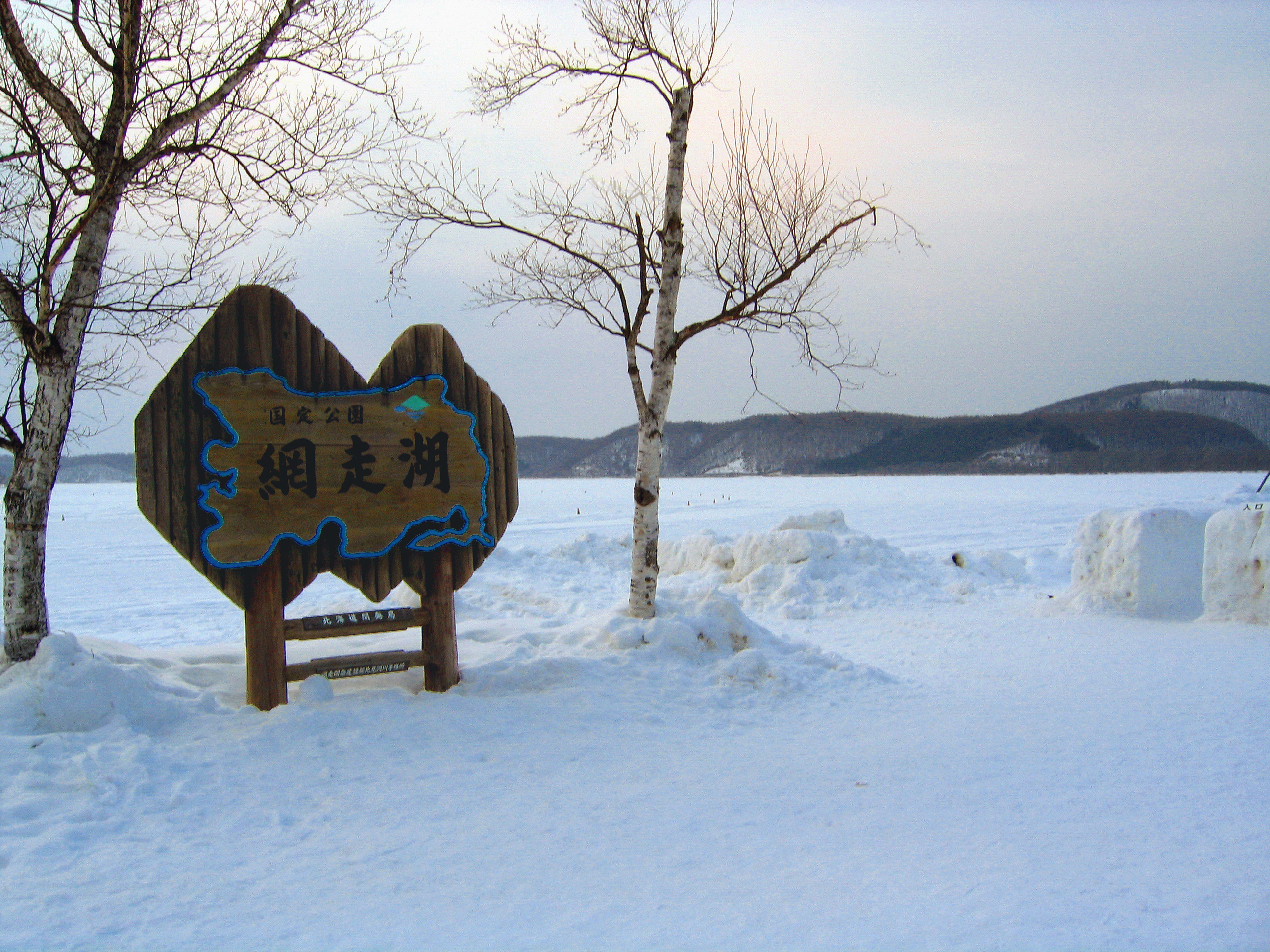
Lake frozen over (February 2004)

The lake freezes over from December to April with ice up to a meter thick. The reduced inflow of water during the winter season causes saltwater to flow upstream from the Sea of Okhotsk and into the lake. This influx of saltwater has created a layer of saline water with 10,000 ppm of chlorine, 10 metres (33 ft) below the surface of the lake with a freshwater upper layer that makes up 46% of the volume of the lake.

== Fauna ==
The wakasagi (Hypomesus nipponensis) and corbicula (Corbicula japonica) are common in the lake.
