= Akan =

Akan may refer to:

== People and languages ==
- Akan people, an ethnic group in Ghana and Côte d'Ivoire
- Akan language, a dialect cluster within the wider Central Tano languages
- Central Tano languages, the languages spoken by the Akan people

== Places ==
- Akan (Ghana parliament constituency)
- Akan District, Hokkaido, Japan
  - Akan, Hokkaido, a town in Akan District, Hokkaido
  - Akan National Park
    - Akan Volcanic Complex, a volcano in Hokkaidō, Japan
    - Lake Akan, a lake in Hokkaidō, Japan
    - Akan River, a river in Hokkaidō, Japan
- Akan, Wisconsin, a town in the United States

== Other uses ==
- Akan religion, traditional beliefs and religious practices of the Akan people
- Akan (surname), a surname
- Akan names, names of Ghana origin
- Akan (biblical figure), a person mentioned in the Book of Genesis
- Akan (Maya god), a deity in Maya religion (identified with the god A')
- Akan (あかん), a Japanese Kansai dialect phrase meaning "No way"

== See also ==
- Acan (disambiguation)
- Akka (disambiguation)
