= National parks in Hokkaido =

National parks in Hokkaido are 6 protected areas. Those are: Rishiri Rebun Sarobetsu National Park, Shiretoko National Park, Akan Mashu National Park, Kushiro Shitsugen National Park, Daisetsuzan National Park, and Shikotsu Toya National Park. Natural Parks, including the national park areas, are established in about 10% of the total land area of Hokkaido Prefecture.

== History ==
The first parks were created in 1934.

== List ==
- The Akan Mashu National Park was created in 1934. The park covers 90,481 ha of north east Hokkaido. Highlights of the park include

- Kawasu Onsen
- Mount Iō
- Tsutsujigahara
- Lake Mashū
- Lake Kussharo
- Bihoro Pass
- Mount Mokoto
- Wakoto Peninsula
- Mount Nishibetsu-dake

- Daisetsuzan National Park was created in 1934. Daisetsuzan is the largest national park in Japan. Its area includes 230,000 ha (568,000 acres) in the mountains in the center of Hokkaido. Among its highlights are

- Sōunkyō Gorge
- Kogen Onsen
- Aizankei
- Lake Shikaribetsu
- Mikuni Pass

Hidaka-sanmyaku Erimo Tokachi National Park”

- Kushiro-shitsugen National Park was created in 1987. The park includes

- Hoso'oka Observatory
- Onnenai
- Lake Toro

- Rishiri-Rebun-Sarobetsu National Park was created in 1974. The park includes

- Mount Rishiri
- Rebun Island
- Sarobetsu plain

- Shikotsu-Tōya National Park was created in 1949. The park includes

- Lake Shikotsu
- Noboribetsu Onsen
- Mount Yōtei
- Lake Tōya

- Shiretoko National Park was created in 1964. Shiretoko is a peninsula at the northeastern end of Hokkaido. Its Ainu name means "land's end." The park's area includes 38,633 ha in Hokkaido. In 2005, Shiretoko was listed by UNESCO as a World Natural Heritage site (WHS). The WHS area include 71,100 ha. The park includes

- Shiretoko Pass
- Furepe Falls
- Mt. Rausu-dake

== See also ==
- Quasi-national parks
