= Akana (disambiguation) =

Akana is an Enterprise API Management and Cloud Integration provider. Akana may also refer to:

- Akana (surname)
- A'ana, a district in Samoa also known as Akana
- Akana, Cameroon, a village in north Cameroon
- Akana, Congo, a village in Republic of the Congo
- Akana, Cuvette-Ouest, a village in Cuvette-Ouest, Congo (Brazzaville)
- Akana, Plateaux, a village in Plateaux, Congo (Brazzaville)
- Akana, Gabon, a town in Ogooué-Ivindo, Gabon
- Akan people of Gabon, known as the Akana
- Akana, Japan, a town subdivision in Shimane Prefecture, Honshū, Japan
- Akana River, a river on southern Honshū island, Japan
- Akana, Russia (Акана), a town in the Sakha (Yakutiya) Republic, Siberia, Russia

== See also ==
- Akan (disambiguation), a disambiguation page
