= Akhan =

Akhan may refer to:

- Əhən, a village in Azerbaijan
- Akhan, Pamukkale, a mahalle in Pamukkale, Turkey
- Akhan Kervansaray (Denizli), a caravanserai in Denizli Province, Turkey
- Akhan Kervansaray (Aksaray), a caravanserai in Aksaray Province. Turkey

== See also ==
- Achan (disambiguation)
- Ahan (disambiguation)
