= Acan =

Acan or ACAN may refer to:

- Acan (god), a Maya deity
- Advisory Committee on Antarctic Names
- ACAN (gene), a gene coding for the aggrecan protein
- ACAN-EFE, a news agency

== See also ==
- Akan (disambiguation)
- Achan (disambiguation)
