= Ehen =

Ehen may refer to:

- Əhən, Azerbaijan
- River Ehen
