= Mount Kamui (Lake Mashū caldera) =

Potentially active volcano on the island of Hokkaido, Japan

- カムイヌプリ
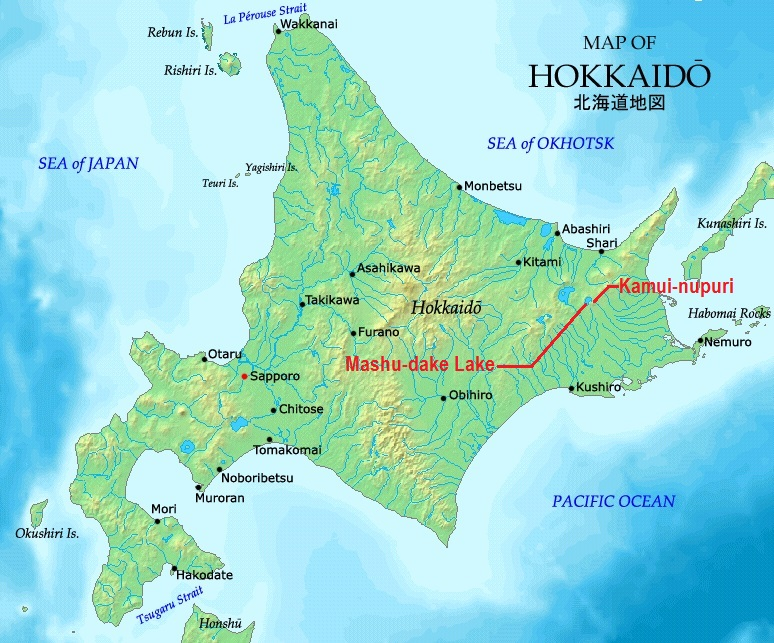
- Map of Hokkaido showing location of Mount Kamui and Lake Mashū.

Highest point
- Elevation: 857 m (2,812 ft)
- Listing: List of mountains and hills of Japan by height
- Coordinates: 43°34′20″N 144°33′39″E

Naming
- English translation: mountain of the gods
- Language of name: Ainu

Geography
- Location: Hokkaido, Japan
- Parent range: Daisetsuzan Volcanic Group
- Topo map(s): Geographical Survey Institute 25000:1 摩周湖南部, 50000:1 摩周湖

Geology
- Mountain type: stratovolcano
- Volcanic arc: Kurile arc
- Last eruption: 1080 CE ± 100 years

Climbing
- Easiest route: Hike

Mount Kamui (カムイヌプリ, Kamui-nupuri ), also Kamuinupuri or Mount Mashū, a potentially active volcano, is a parasitic stratovolcano of the Mashū caldera (itself originally a parasitic cone of Lake Kussharo) located in the Akan National Park of Hokkaido, Japan.

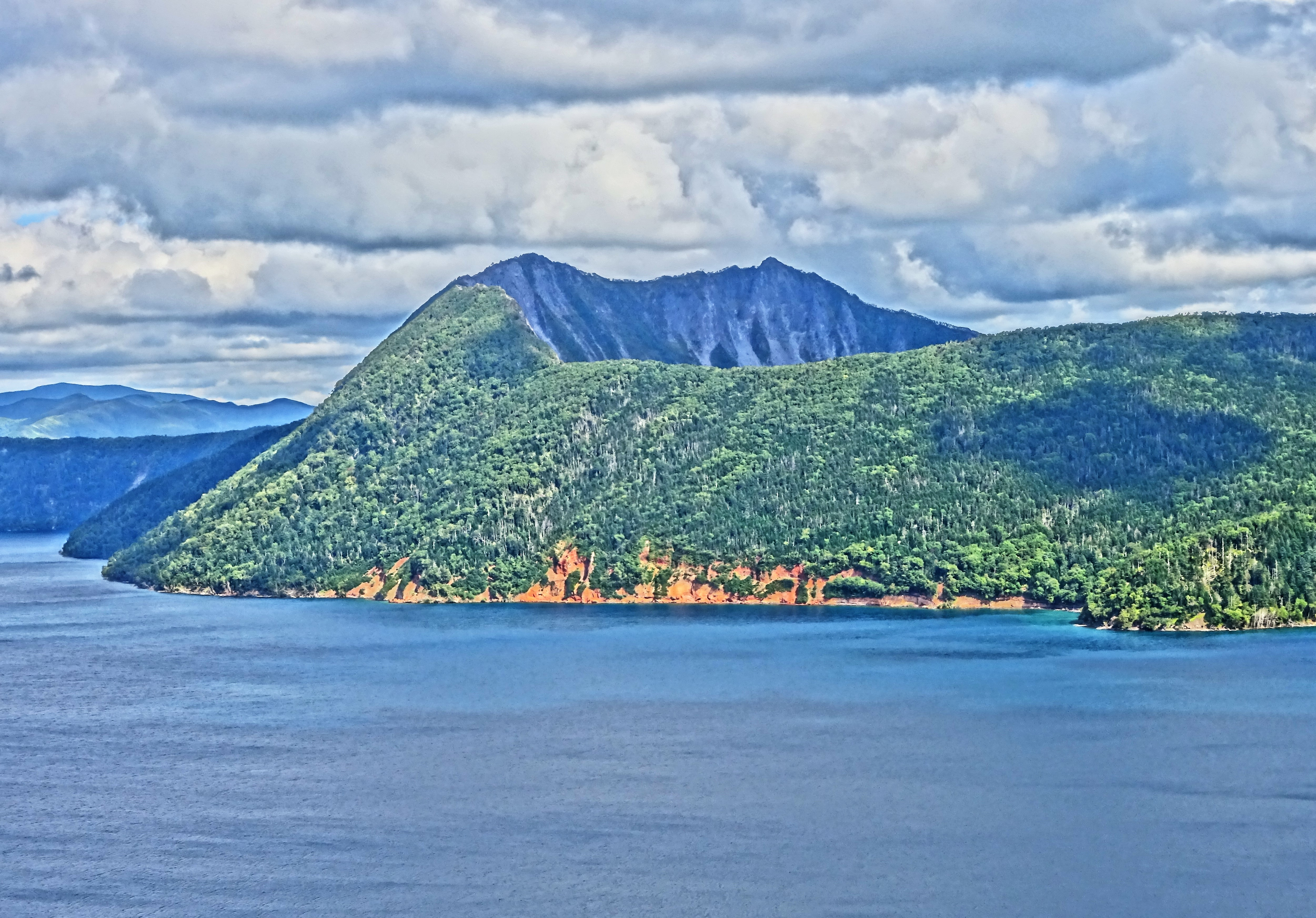
Mount Kamui rising above Lake Mashū.

== Volcanism ==
Mount Kamui rose on the rim of 6 km-wide Mashū caldera, about four thousand years ago, after the collapse of Mashū volcano. Its last eruption took place about 1000 years ago.

== Tourism ==
Hikers can follow a 7.2 km wooded trail to the peak of the mountain, walking along the ridge of the caldera, which is a 300-m vertical drop to the surface of the Lake Mashū.
