= Akan River =

River in Hokkaido, Japan

Akan River 阿寒川
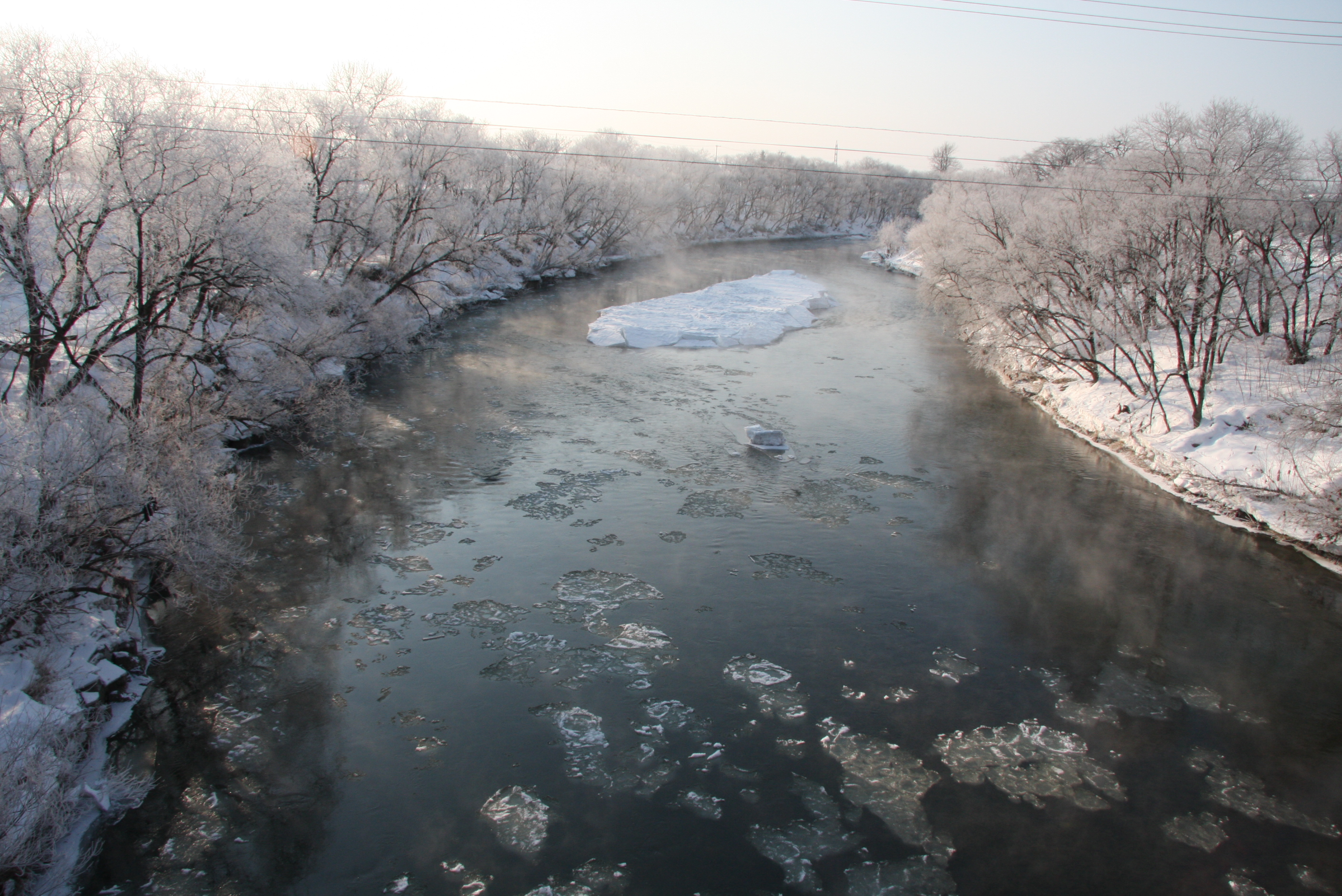

- Location within Japan
- Native name: Akan-gawa (Japanese)

Location
- Country: Japan
- State: Hokkaidō
- Region: Kushiro
- District: Kushiro

Physical characteristics
- Source: Lake Akan
  - location: Kushiro
  - coordinates: 43°25′55″N 144°8′12″E
  - elevation: 420 m (1,380 ft)
- Mouth: Pacific Ocean
  - location: Kushiro
  - coordinates: 43°0′12″N 144°16′20″E
  - elevation: 0 m (0 ft)
- Length: 98 km (61 mi)
- Basin size: 718 km^{2} (277 sq mi)

Akan River (阿寒川, Akan-gawa) is a river in Hokkaidō, Japan.

== Course ==
The Akan River rises from Lake Akan, 420 metres (1,380 ft) above sea level. The lake formed when the Akan River was dammed by an eruption of Mount Oakan some 6000 years ago. The river exits the lake at Takiguchi as a waterfall. This spot and Takimi Bridge nearby are attractions in Akan National Park.

The river winds its way south entirely within the district managed by Kushiro, Hokkaidō. The river then flows into the Pacific Ocean.
