= Mount Meakan =

Active stratovolcano on the island of Hokkaido, Japan

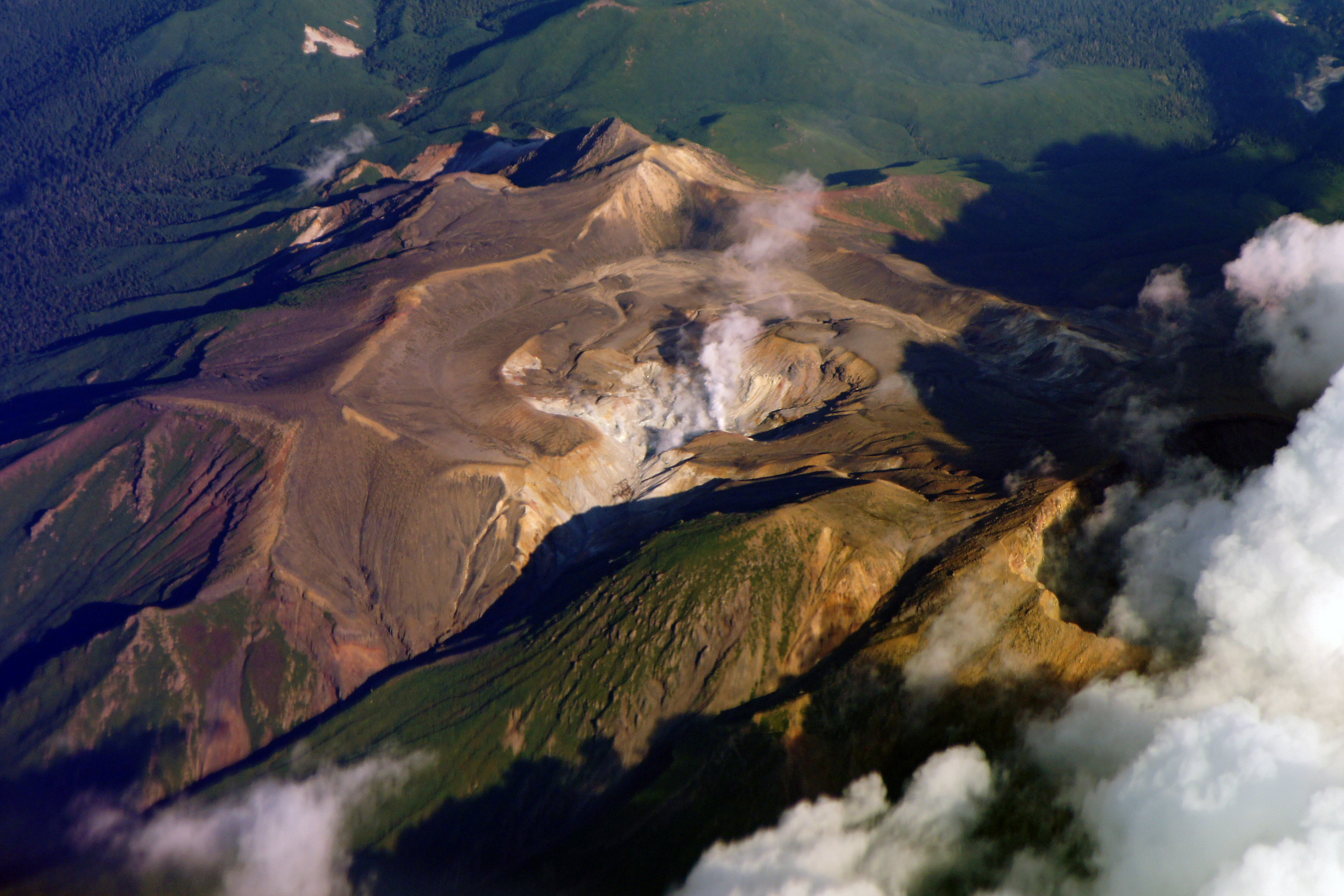

Highest point
- Elevation: 1,499 m (4,918 ft)
- Prominence: 1,175 m (3,855 ft)
- Listing: List of mountains and hills of Japan by height List of volcanoes in Japan; 100 Famous Japanese Mountains; Ribu
- Coordinates: 43°23′11″N 144°00′32″E

Naming
- Native name: 雌阿寒岳 (Japanese); Meakan-dake (Japanese)

Geography
- Location within Hokkaido
- Location: Hokkaidō, Japan
- Parent range: Akan Volcanic Complex
- Topo map(s): Geographical Survey Institute 25000:1 雌阿寒岳; 25000:1 オンネト; 50000:1 阿寒湖; 50000:1 上足寄

Geology
- Rock age: Late Pleistocene-Holocene
- Mountain type: stratovolcano
- Volcanic arc: Kurile arc
- Last eruption: November 2008

Mount Meakan (雌阿寒岳, Meakan-dake) is an active stratovolcano located in Akan National Park in Hokkaidō, Japan. It is the tallest mountain in the Akan Volcanic Complex. The volcano consists of nine overlapping cones that grew out of the Akan caldera, on the shores of Lake Akan. Mount Meakan has a triple crater at its summit. According to its name and local legend, Mount Meakan is the female counterpart to Mount Oakan on the other side of Lake Akan.

== Geography ==
There are two ponds in the crater, 赤沼 (Sekinuma, Red Pond) and 青沼 (Aonuma, Blue Pond).

== Gallery ==
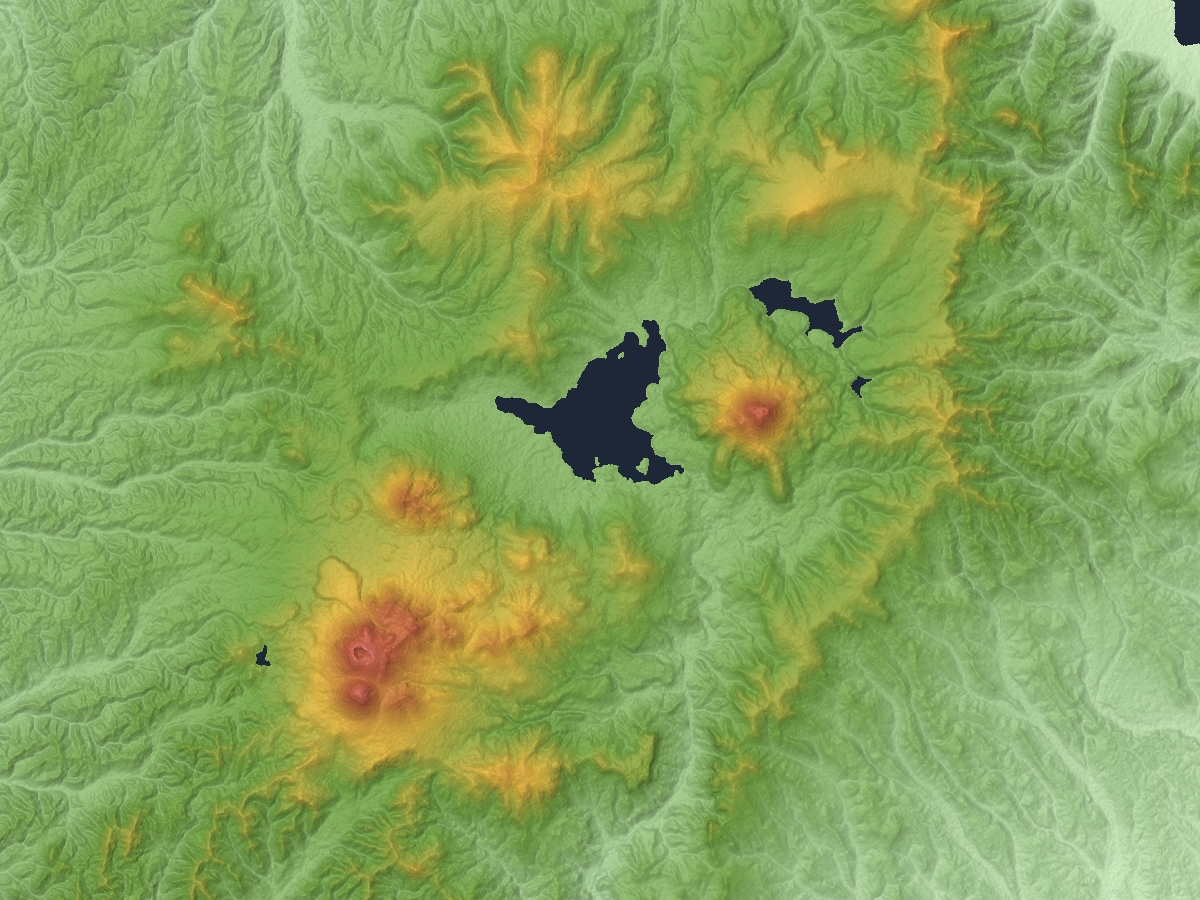
Akan Caldera
Me-Akan (bottom left)
O-Akan (center right)

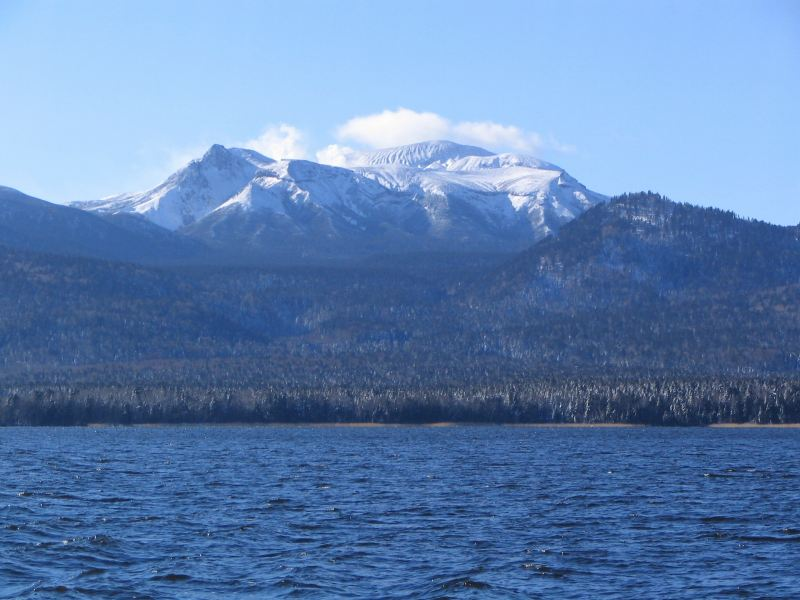
Seen from the NE

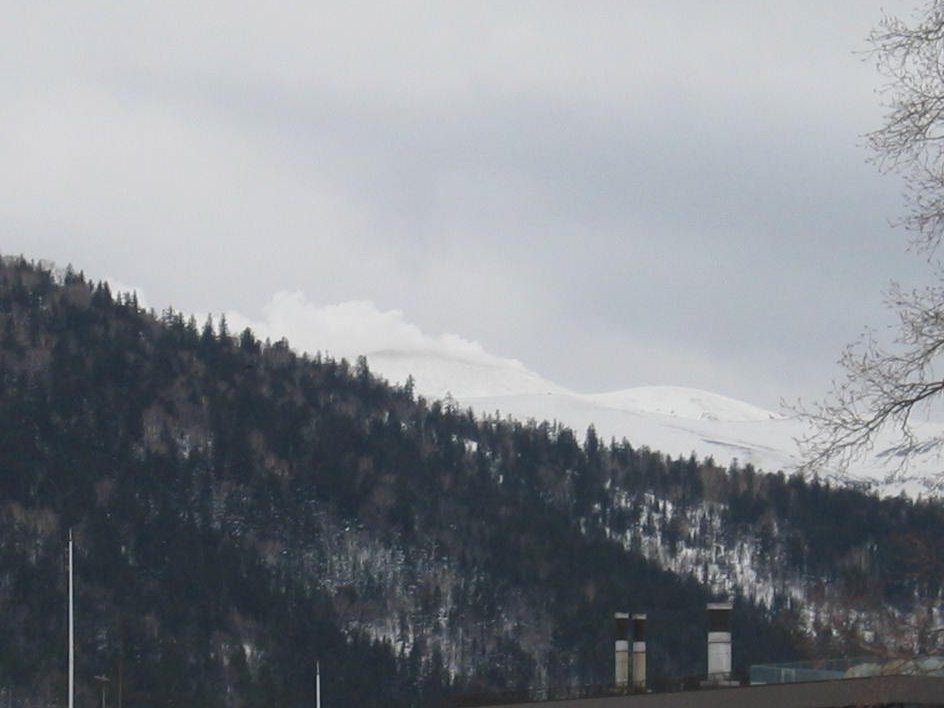
March 2006 eruption

== See also ==
- List of volcanoes in Japan
