= Duvaryan =

- Location within Azerbaijan
- Coordinates: 40°54′N 48°25′E
- Country: Azerbaijan
- Rayon: Ismailli
- Municipality: Əhən
- Time zone: UTC+4 (AZT)
  - Summer (DST): UTC+5 (AZT)

Duvaryan is a village in the Ismailli Rayon of Azerbaijan. The village forms part of the municipality of Əhən.
