= Kamuiwakka Falls =

Thermal spring

Kamuiwakka Falls カムイワッカの滝
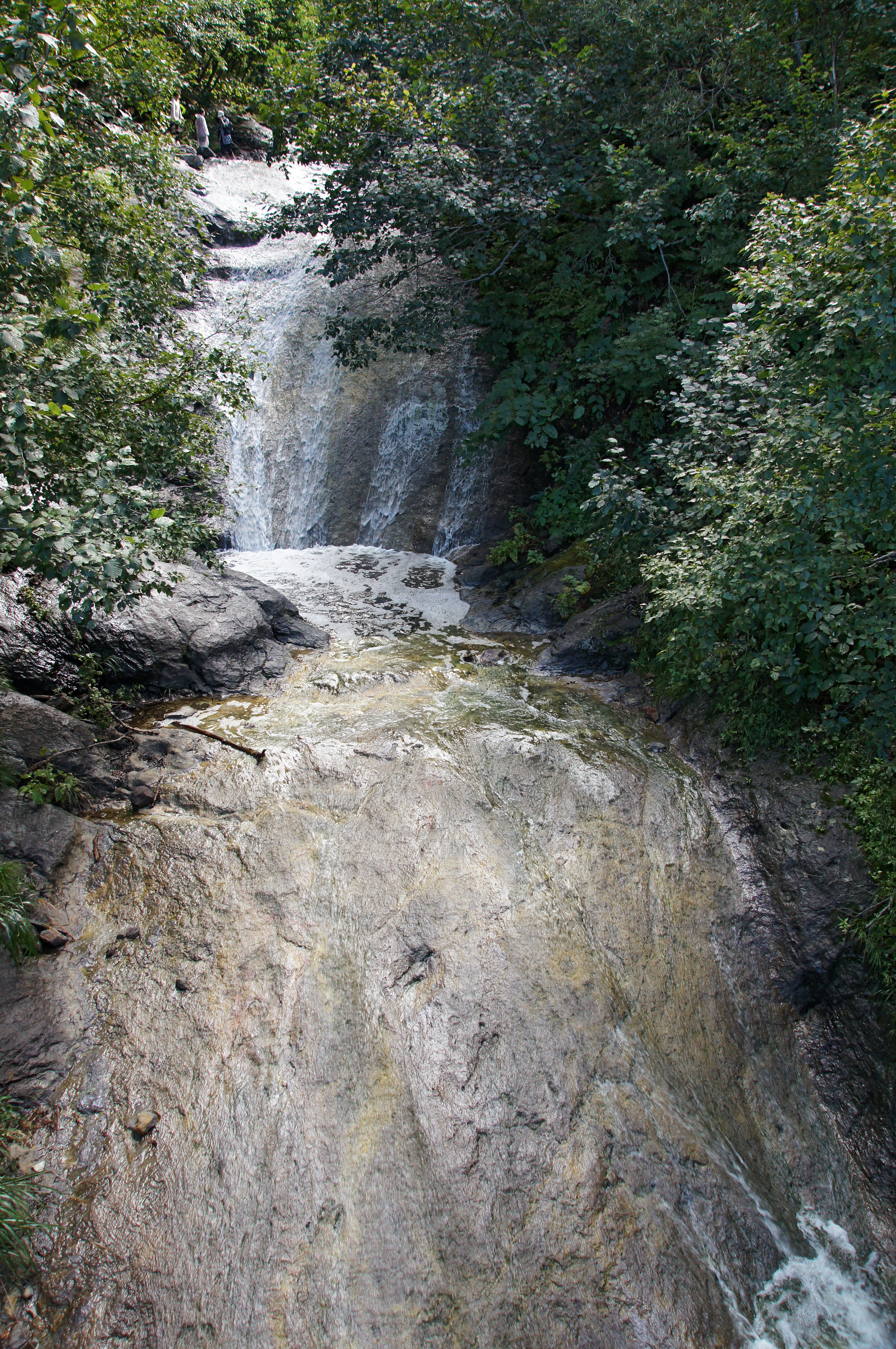

- Location within Hokkaido Location within Japan
- Location: Shiretoko National Park, Okhotsk Subprefecture, Hokkaido, Japan
- Coordinates: 44°9′14.1″N 145°7′44.8″E

Kamuiwakka Falls (カムイワッカの滝, Kamuiwakka no Taki) is a natural hot spring in Shiretoko National Park, Japan. It is on the Kamuiwakka River.

== Gallery ==
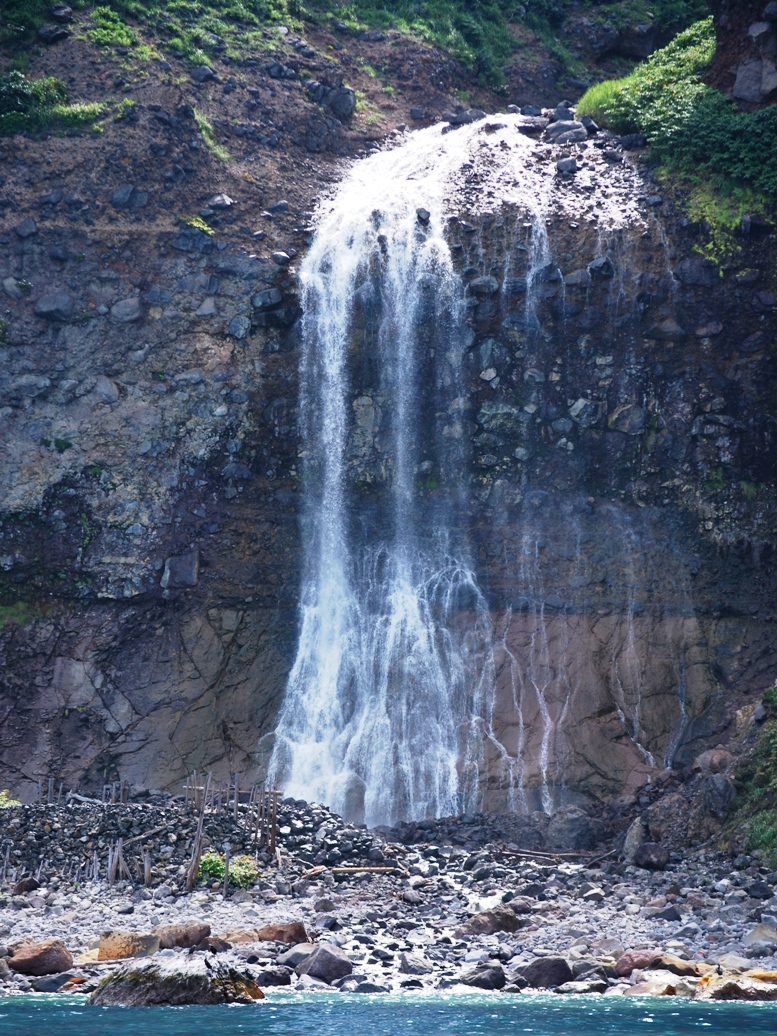

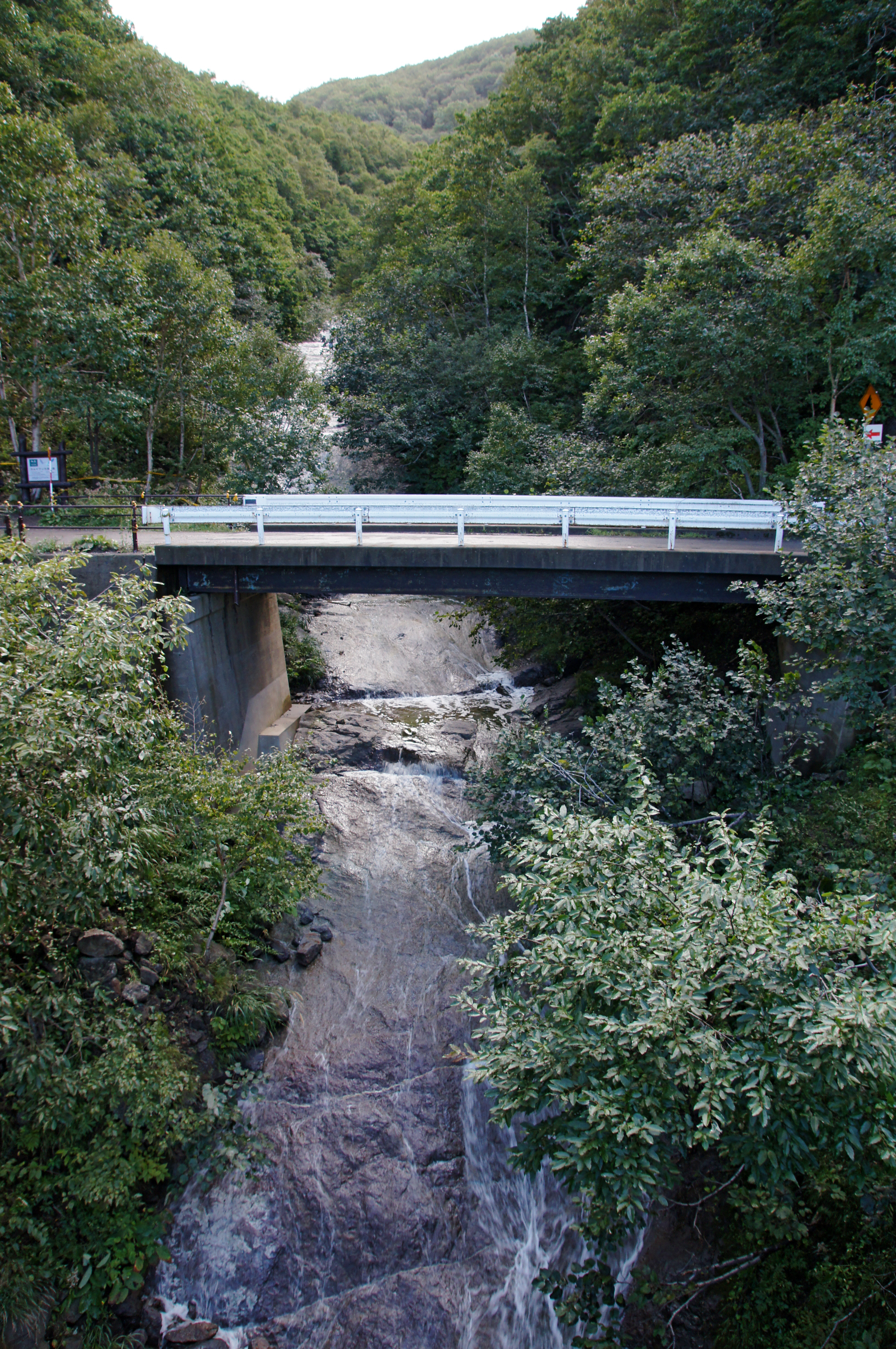

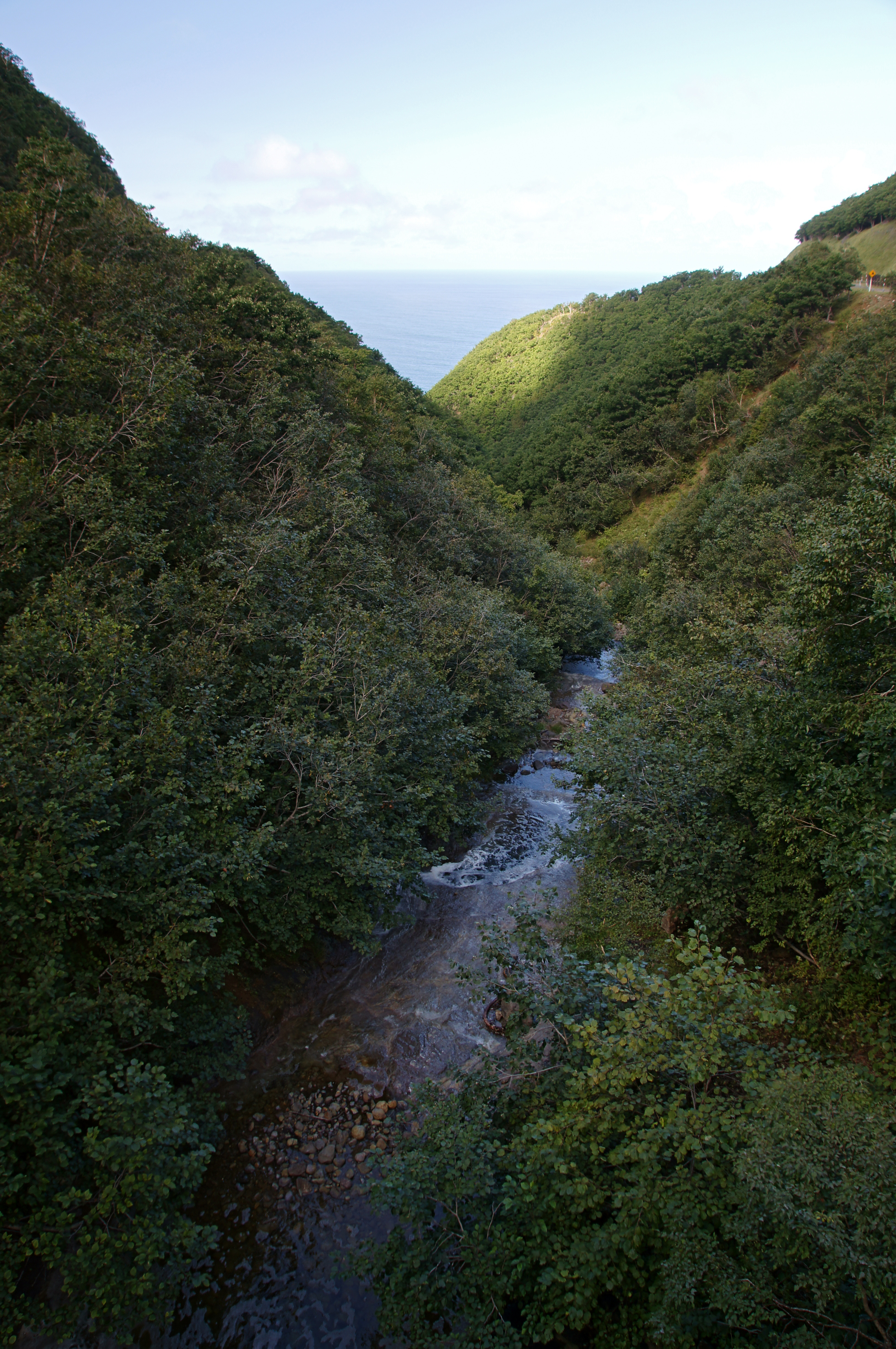

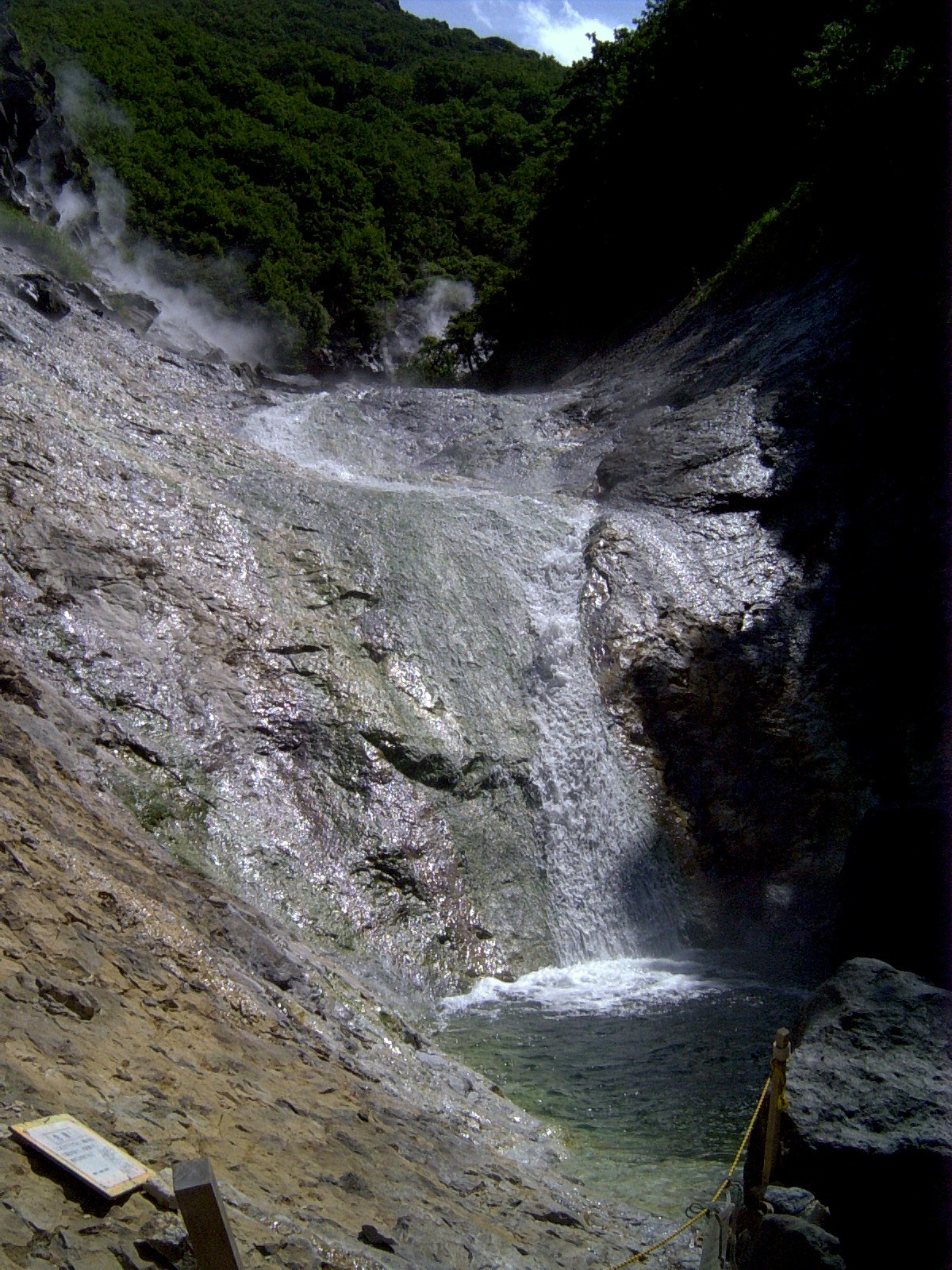

== See also ==
- Onnetō Hot Falls
