= Ahan =

Ahan may refer to,

- Əhən, Azerbaijan
- Ahan language, spoken in Nigeria
- AHAN, Korean-Japanese singer-song writer
- Ahaan, a 2019 Indian Hindi-language film
- Ahaana Krishna (born 1995), Indian actress
- Aahana Kumra, Indian actress
- Ahan Prakash, Indian footballer
- Ahan Shetty (born 1995), Indian actor
