= Onnetō Hot Falls =

Thermal spring waterfall

Coordinates: 43.3698°N 143.9782°E

Onnetō Yu-no-Taki (オンネトー湯の滝) is a hot waterfall near Lake Onnetō in Akan Mashu National Park, Hokkaidō, Japan. Water of a temperature of 43 °C (109 °F) descends from a height of 30 m (98 ft). Formerly an onsen, its use as an open-air bath was discontinued after it was discovered that the site and its black mud contains an important deposit of manganese. The Onnetō Hot Falls Manganese Oxide Generation Area (オンネトー湯の滝マンガン酸化物生成地) was designated a Natural Monument of Japan in 2000.

== See also ==
- Kamuiwakka Hot Falls
- List of Special Places of Scenic Beauty, Special Historic Sites and Special Natural Monuments
