= Ximran =

- Location within Azerbaijan
- Coordinates: 40°51′56″N 48°25′06″E
- Country: Azerbaijan
- Rayon: Ismailli
- Municipality: Əhən
- Time zone: UTC+4 (AZT)
  - Summer (DST): UTC+5 (AZT)

Ximran (also, Xımran, Khimran, and Khirman) is a village in the Ismailli Rayon of Azerbaijan. The village forms part of the municipality of Əhən.
