= Lake Onnetō =

Lake in Akan Mashu National Park, Japan

- オンネトー (Japanese)
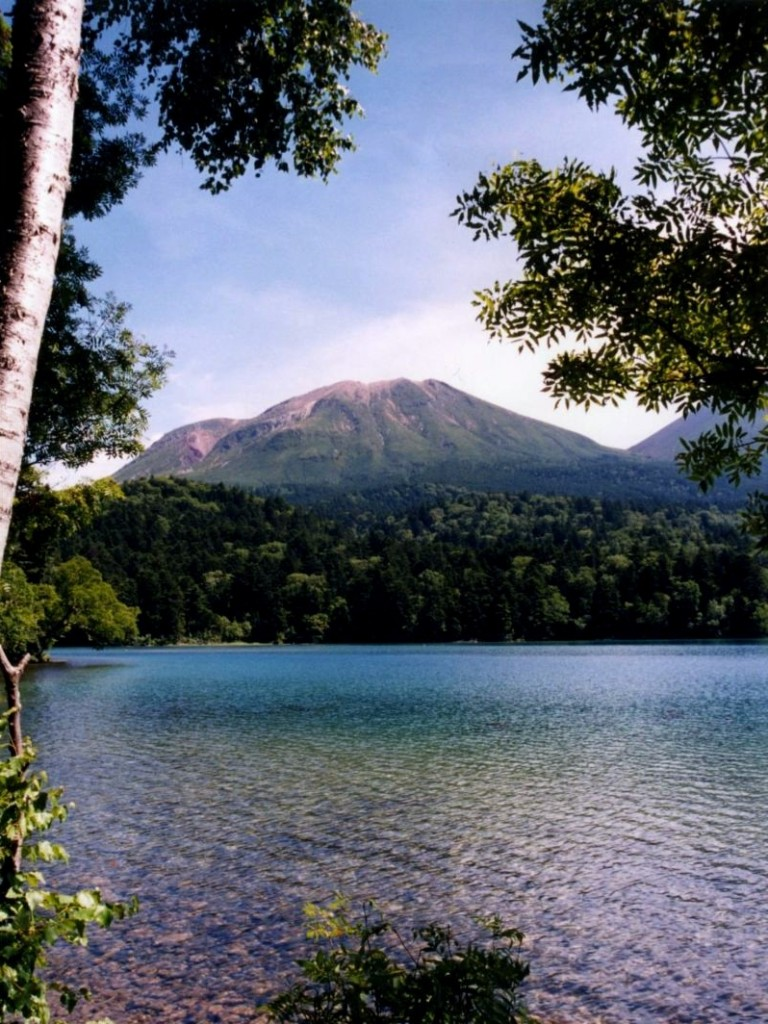
- Lake Onnetō in Akan National Park

- Location within Japan
- Coordinates: 43°23′04″N 143°58′12″E

Lake Onnetō (オンネトー), from the Ainu onne (ancient) and to (lake), is a freshwater lake near Ashoro in Akan National Park, Hokkaidō, Japan.

== See also ==
- Onnetō Hot Falls
