= Kamuiwakka River =

River in Hokkaidō, Japan

Kamuiwakka River カムイワッカ川
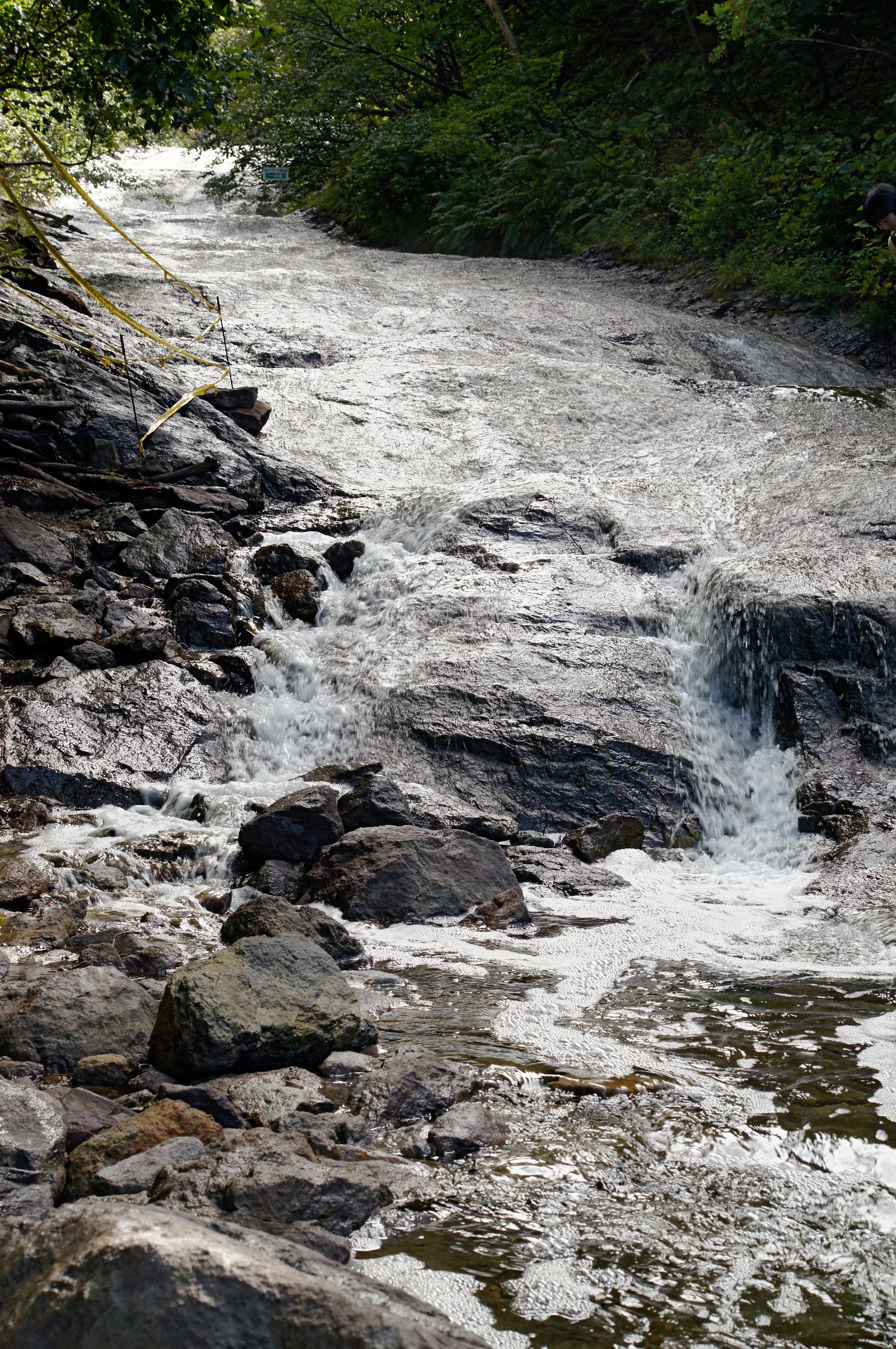
- Kamuiwakka Falls (August 2002)

- Location within Japan
- Native name: Kamuiwakka-kawa (Japanese)

Location
- Country: Japan
- State: Hokkaido
- Region: Okhotsk
- District: Shari
- Municipality: Shari

Physical characteristics
- Source: Mount Iō
  - location: Shari, Hokkaido, Japan
  - coordinates: 44°8′23″N 145°8′45″E
  - elevation: 880 m (2,890 ft)
- Mouth: Pacific Ocean
  - location: Shari, Hokkaido, Japan
  - coordinates: 44°9′33″N 145°7′17″E
  - elevation: 0 m (0 ft)

The Kamuiwakka River (カムイワッカ川, Kamuiwakka-kawa) is a river in Hokkaido, Japan. Because of its volcanic origin, the water temperature reaches 30 °C (86 °F).

== Course ==
The Kamuiwakka River rises on the slopes of Mount Iō on the Shiretoko Peninsula. It flows Northwest until it reaches the Pacific Ocean. Kamuiwakka Falls are on the Kamuiwakka River.
