= Lake Akan =

Lake in Kushiro, Hokkaidō, Japan

- 阿寒湖 (Japanese)
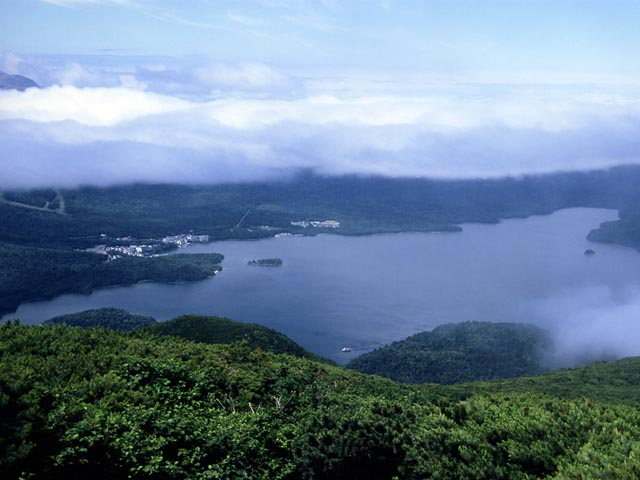
- The view from Mount Oakan (July 2008)

- Location within Japan
- Location: Kushiro, Hokkaidō, Japan
- Coordinates: 43°27′6″N 144°5′55″E
- Lake type: Dimictic
- Primary outflows: Akan River
- Catchment area: 148 km^{2} (57 mi^{2})
- Basin countries: Japan
- Surface area: 13 km^{2} (3,200 acres)
- Average depth: 17.8 m (58 ft)
- Max. depth: 44.8 m (147 ft)
- Water volume: 0.23 km^{3} (0.055 mi^{3})
- Shore length^{1}: 25.9 km (16.1 mi)
- Surface elevation: 420 m (1,380 ft)
- Frozen: December to April
- Islands: 4: Ōjima, Kojima, Yaitai Island, Chūrui Island
- Settlements: Kushiro

Ramsar Wetland
- Official name: Akan-ko
- Designated: 8 November 2005
- Reference no.: 1540
- ^{1} Shore length is not a well-defined measure.

Lake Akan (阿寒湖, Akan-ko) is a lake in Kushiro, Hokkaidō, Japan. It is located in Akan National Park and is a Ramsar Site.

== History ==
Volcanic activity formed the lake some 6,000 years ago, when a lava dam was formed. The lake used to have a clarity of 8–9 metres (26–30 ft) in the 1930s. Pollution from local hotspring resorts has decreased the transparency to 3–4 metres (9.8–13.1 ft).

== Flora and fauna ==
The lake is famous for its marimo (Aegagropila linnaei), aggregations of algae that form into spherical shapes 2–30 centimetres (0.79–11.81 in) in diameter. Other flora of the lake include the following:

- Phragmites communis
- Nuphar sp.
- Potamogeton crispus
- Hydrilla verticillata
- Myriophyllum verticillatum
- Vallisneria gigantea
- Melosira italica
- Asterionella formosa
- Synedra

Kokanee salmon (Oncorhynchus nerka) are native to Lake Akan. Other fauna of the lake include the following:

- Zooplankton:
  - Daphnia longiremis
  - Bosmina coregoni
  - Eurytemora affinis
- Bottom:
  - Chironomus plumosus
  - Tubificidae
- Fish:
  - Common carp
  - Crucian carp
  - Pond smelt
  - Big-scaled redfin

== Climate ==
Climate data for Lake Akan (1991−2020 normals, extremes 1977−present)
Month	Jan	Feb	Mar	Apr	May	Jun	Jul	Aug	Sep	Oct	Nov	Dec	Year
Record high °C (°F)	6.1 (43.0)	10.8 (51.4)	16.5 (61.7)	28.3 (82.9)	35.5 (95.9)	34.5 (94.1)	34.9 (94.8)	33.9 (93.0)	31.4 (88.5)	24.5 (76.1)	19.0 (66.2)	11.8 (53.2)	35.5 (95.9)
Mean daily maximum °C (°F)	−4.2 (24.4)	−3.1 (26.4)	1.4 (34.5)	8.1 (46.6)	15.1 (59.2)	18.9 (66.0)	22.3 (72.1)	22.8 (73.0)	19.0 (66.2)	13.2 (55.8)	5.8 (42.4)	−1.4 (29.5)	9.8 (49.7)
Daily mean °C (°F)	−10.0 (14.0)	−9.4 (15.1)	−4.2 (24.4)	2.3 (36.1)	8.5 (47.3)	13.1 (55.6)	17.1 (62.8)	18.0 (64.4)	14.0 (57.2)	7.5 (45.5)	0.7 (33.3)	−6.5 (20.3)	4.3 (39.7)
Mean daily minimum °C (°F)	−16.7 (1.9)	−16.8 (1.8)	−10.8 (12.6)	−3.3 (26.1)	2.3 (36.1)	8.0 (46.4)	12.9 (55.2)	13.9 (57.0)	9.3 (48.7)	2.1 (35.8)	−4.3 (24.3)	−12.1 (10.2)	−1.3 (29.7)
Record low °C (°F)	−30.2 (−22.4)	−30.7 (−23.3)	−26.6 (−15.9)	−20.9 (−5.6)	−7.5 (18.5)	−3.3 (26.1)	1.8 (35.2)	3.2 (37.8)	−1.2 (29.8)	−7.6 (18.3)	−17.3 (0.9)	−26.9 (−16.4)	−30.7 (−23.3)
Average precipitation mm (inches)	63.2 (2.49)	44.5 (1.75)	70.2 (2.76)	90.8 (3.57)	105.7 (4.16)	84.4 (3.32)	103.2 (4.06)	160.0 (6.30)	165.7 (6.52)	137.8 (5.43)	85.2 (3.35)	87.4 (3.44)	1,197.9 (47.16)
Average snowfall cm (inches)	132 (52)	96 (38)	105 (41)	54 (21)	3 (1.2)	0 (0)	0 (0)	0 (0)	0 (0)	1 (0.4)	31 (12)	123 (48)	548 (216)
Average precipitation days (≥ 1.0 mm)	10.2	8.9	11.5	11.3	11.0	10.1	10.4	11.4	12.0	10.5	9.8	9.8	126.9
Average snowy days (≥ 3 cm)	12.3	10.4	12.1	7.0	0.4	0	0	0	0	0.1	3.9	13.0	59.2
Mean monthly sunshine hours	97.5	111.9	137.1	154.0	169.4	146.3	132.2	115.7	110.1	123.3	110.6	107.3	1,546
Source: Japan Meteorological Agency

== Gallery ==
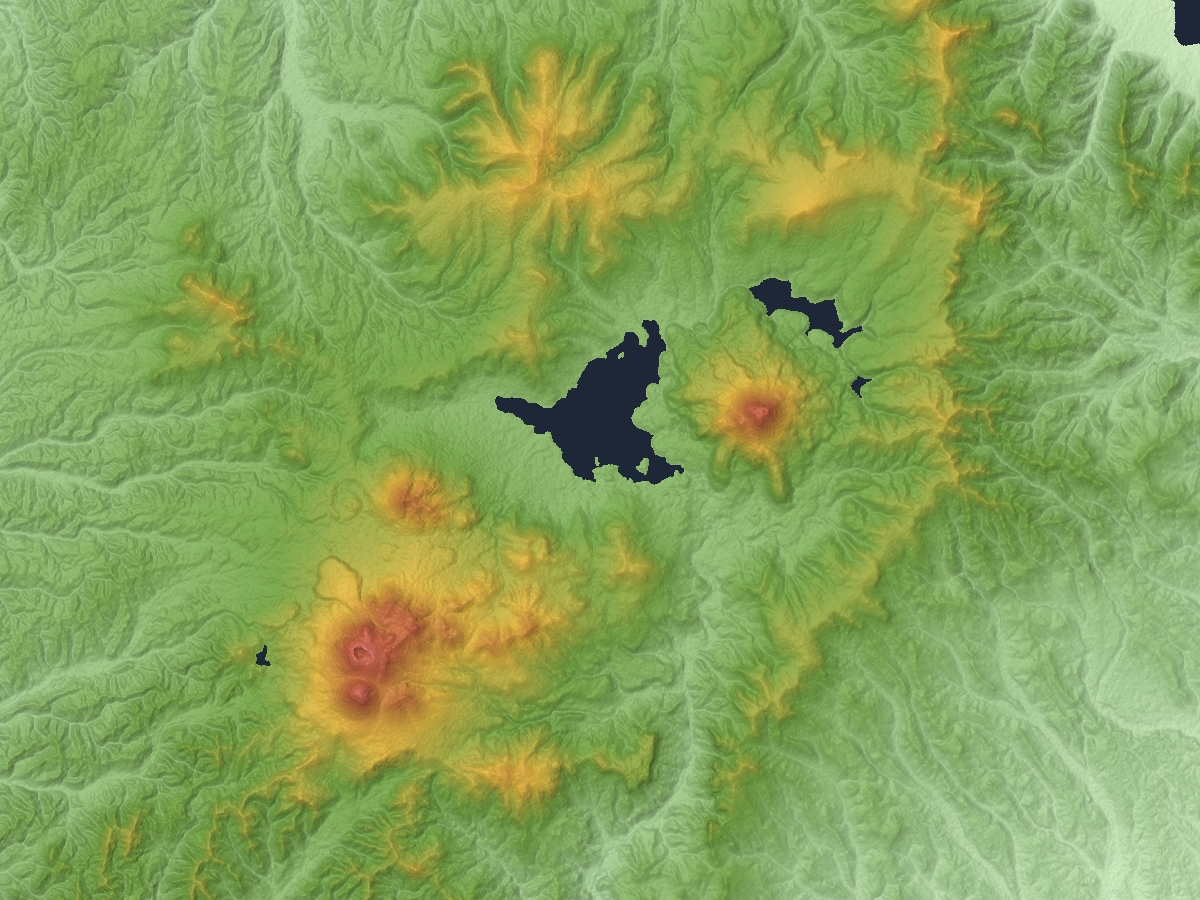
Akan Caldera
Lake Akan (center)
Mount Meakan (bottom left)
Mount Oakan (center right)

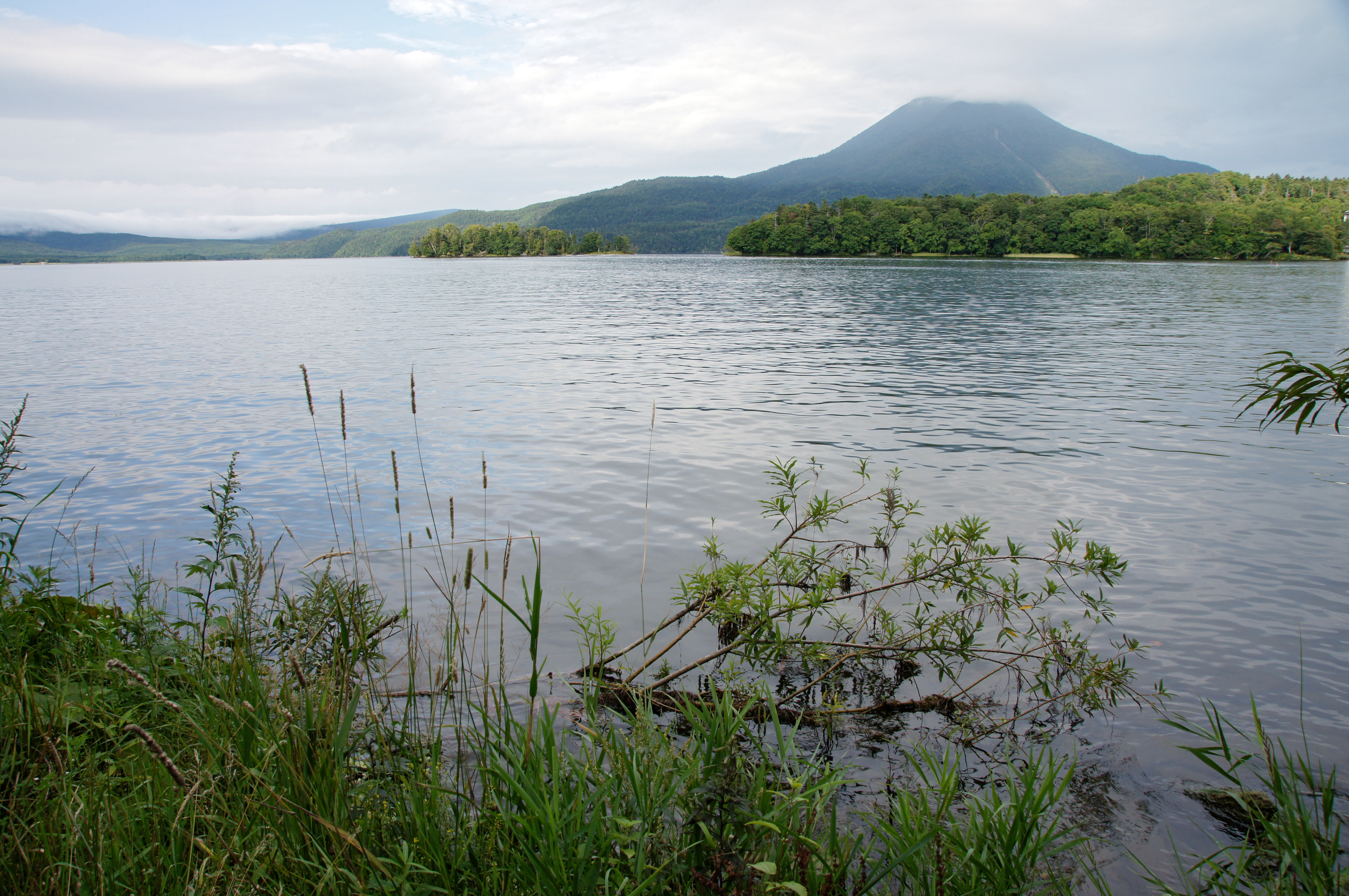
Lake Akan and Mount Oakan

A few scenes in 2021

== See also ==
- List of Special Places of Scenic Beauty, Special Historic Sites and Special Natural Monuments
- Ramsar sites in Japan
