= Mount Oakan =

Stratovolcano/Lava dome on the island of Hokkaido, Japan

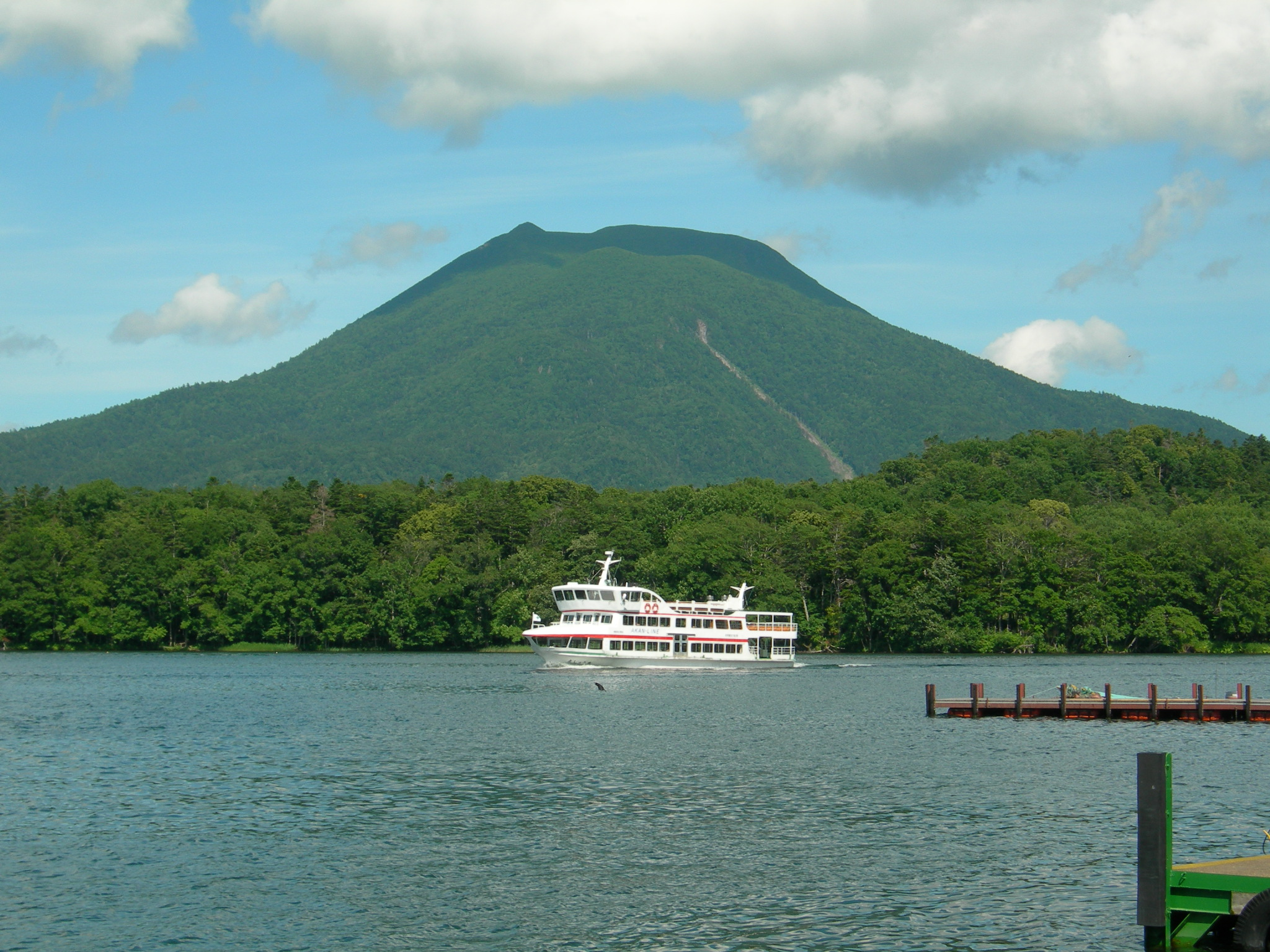
- Seen from the WSW

Highest point
- Elevation: 1,370.4 m (4,496 ft)
- Listing: List of mountains and hills of Japan by height
- Coordinates: 43°27′06″N 144°09′53″E

Naming
- Native name: 雄阿寒岳 (Japanese)

Geography
- Location within Japan Location within Hokkaido
- Location: Hokkaidō, Japan
- Parent range: Akan Volcanic Complex
- Topo map(s): Geographical Survey Institute 25000:1 雄阿寒岳; 50000:1 阿寒湖

Geology
- Rock age: Late Pleistocene-Holocene
- Mountain type(s): Stratovolcano, Lava dome
- Volcanic arc: Kuril arc
- Last eruption: 2008

Mount Oakan (雄阿寒岳, Oakan-dake) is a stratovolcano located in Akan National Park in Hokkaidō, Japan.

== Geography and geology ==
Mount Oakan sits in the Akan caldera northeast of Lake Akan. The volcano rises some 900 metres (3,000 ft) above the surrounding terrain. The top of the volcano is 1,370 metres (4,490 ft) above sea level. The volcanic cone is some 8 kilometres (5.0 mi) in diameter. There are three explosion craters at the summit. At Kitanakahara (北中腹) at about 800 metres (2,600 ft), there is a fumarole. The volcano is made mostly from non-alkali mafic volcanic rock. The main rock type is andesite and dacite.

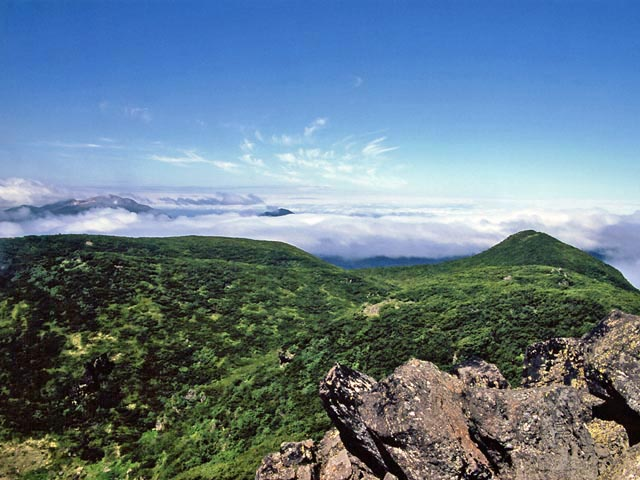
View from the Siberian dwarf pine zone on Mount Oakan, looking toward Mount Meakan. (July 2008)

== History ==
Mount Oakan emerged in the Late Pleistocene dropping pumice on Minamishikata. After that, continuous lava flows formed the bulk of the volcano. In the final stages of its life, a parasitic volcano formed a lava dome at the summit.

According to its name and local legend, Mount Oakan is the male counterpart to Mount Meakan on the other side of Lake Akan.
