= Akan (surname) =

Akan is a Turkish surname. Notable people with the surname include:

- Mahmut Akan (born 1994), Turkish footballer
- Metin Akan (born 1983), Turkish footballer
- Tarık Akan (1949–2016), Turkish actor and producer

== See also ==
- Akar
