= Lake Mashū =

Crater lake in Akan Mashu National Park, Hokkaido island, Japan

Lake Mashū 摩周湖
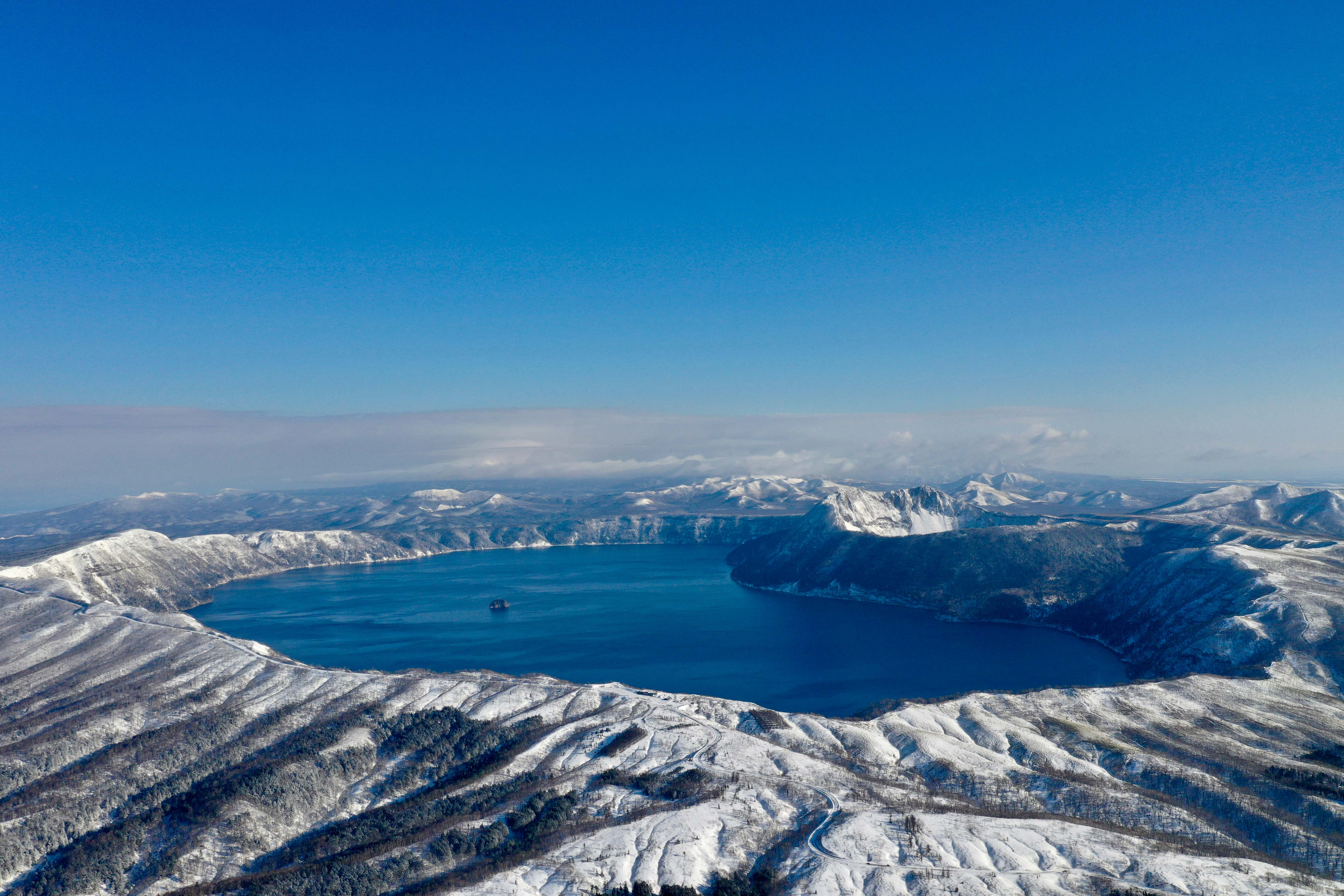
- Lake Mashū, Japan, during winter

- Location within Japan
- Location: Teshikaga, Kushiro Subprefecture, Hokkaido, Japan
- Coordinates: 43°35′N 144°31′E
- Type: crater lake, endorheic
- Primary inflows: two streams
- Primary outflows: seepage
- Catchment area: 32.4 km^{2} (12.5 mi^{2})
- Basin countries: Japan
- Max. length: 6 km (3.7 mi)
- Surface area: 19 km^{2} (4,700 acres)
- Average depth: 137.5 m (451 ft)
- Max. depth: 211.5 m (694 ft)
- Water volume: 2.86 km^{3} (0.69 mi^{3})
- Shore length^{1}: 19.8 km (12.3 mi)
- Surface elevation: 351 m (1,152 ft)
- Frozen: December to April
- Islands: Kamuishu Island
- Settlements: none
- ^{1} Shore length is not a well-defined measure.

Lake Mashū (摩周湖, Mashū-ko) (Ainu: Kamuy-to) is an endorheic crater lake formed in the caldera of a potentially active volcano. It is located in Akan Mashu National Park on the island of Hokkaido, Japan. It has been called the clearest lake in the world.

== Hydrology ==
Aerial panorama of Lake Mashū during summer

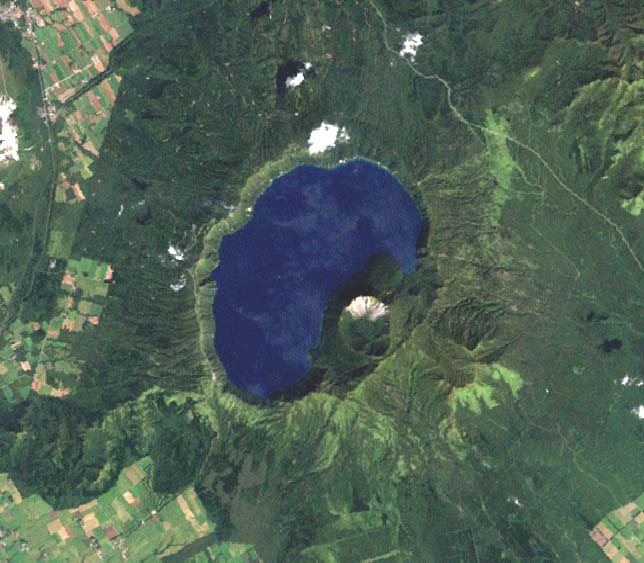
Landsat image of the lake (1999)

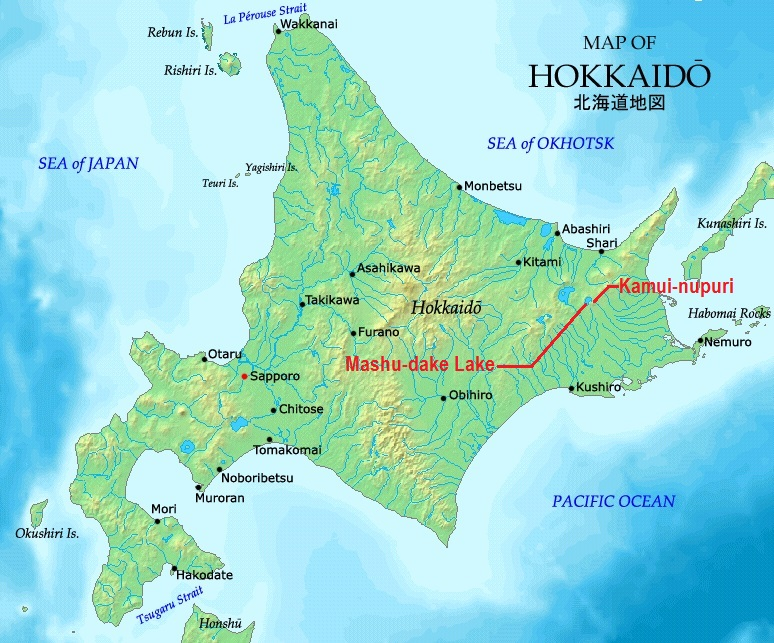
Map of Hokkaido showing location of Lake Mashū and Mount Kamui

Lake Mashū is surrounded by steep crater walls 200 metres (660 ft) high. It has no significant inlets and no outlet. The lake is one of the clearest in the world and one of the deepest in Japan. On August 1, 1931, the transparency of the water was measured at 41.6 metres (136 ft). Around the same time Lake Baikal was measured 40.5 metres (133 ft). This is the basis for the lake's claim to be the clearest in the world. Since the 1950s the transparency has tended to range between 20 and 30 metres (66 and 98 ft). The loss in transparency is probably due to the introduction of sockeye salmon and rainbow trout into the lake and landslides. At the same time, the clarity of Lake Baikal has not been measured.

In summer, the surface of Lake Mashū is often obscured by fog. There is usually fog covering around the lake for about 100 days of the year. This has given the lake a reputation for mysteriousness. A local legend says that if a person can see the surface of the lake, they will have bad luck.

== Origin of the name ==
The origin of Lake Mashū's name is unclear. The lake's original Ainu name was Kintan-kamuy-to or lake of the mountain god. Ainu language researcher Nagata Housei proposed that the Japanese name originated from the Ainu Mas-un-to or lake of the gulls. This was then rendered as Lake Mashin (魔神湖, Mashin-ko) by the Japanese. Over time, however, the Japanese began to refer to the lake by the Japanese reading for the neighboring peak, Mount Mashū (摩周岳, Mashū-dake). The kanji for this peak translate roughly as scrubbed area mountain. The Ainu name for this peak, by which it is commonly known today, is Kamuinupuri or mountain of the gods. The lake also retains its Ainu name in a shortened form, as Kamuyto or lake of the gods.

== Volcanic caldera ==
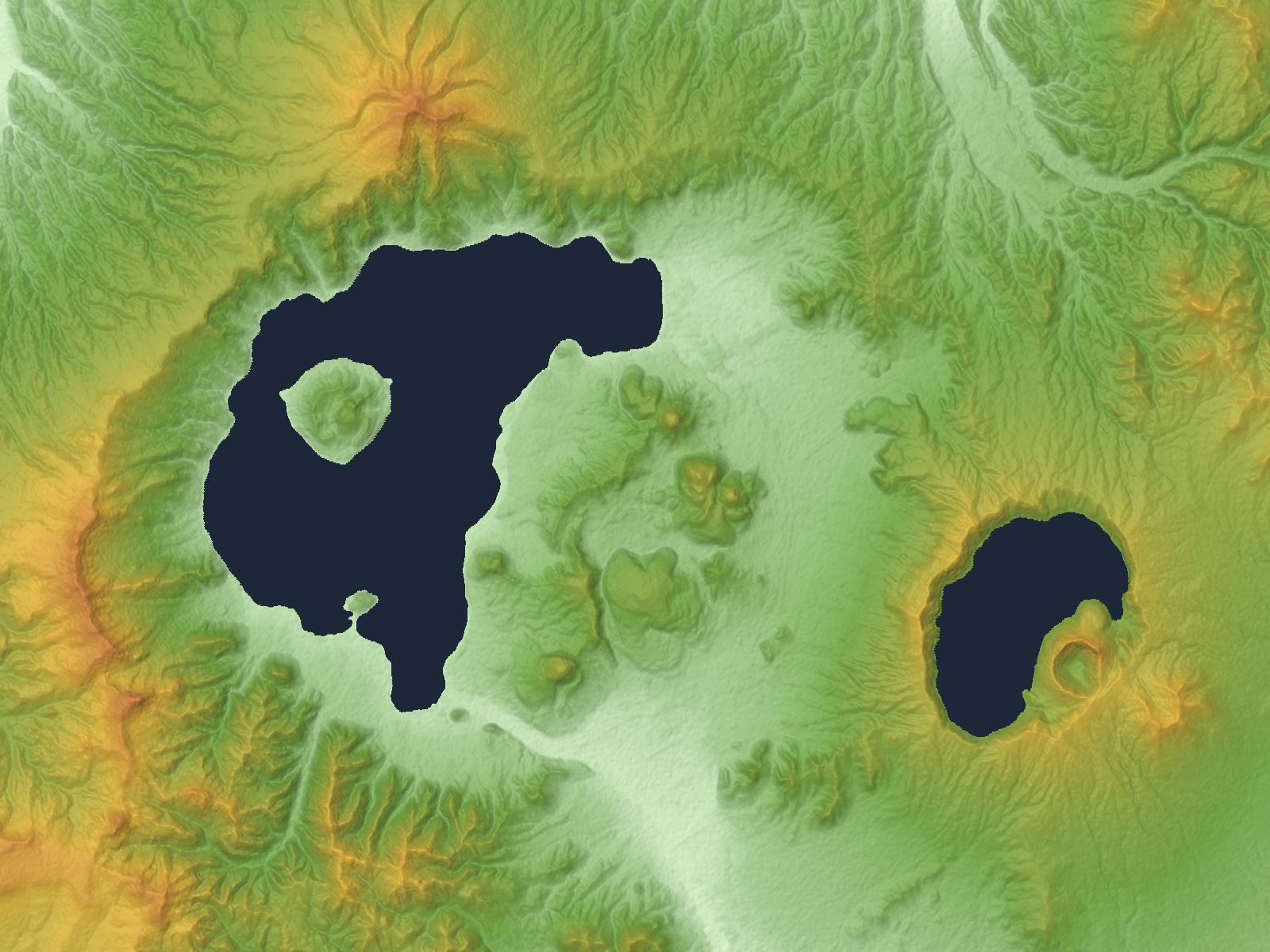
Relief map of Kussharo Caldera (left) & Mashu Caldera (right)

Mashū formed less than 32,000 years ago. The caldera is the remains of a stratovolcano, which is actually a parasitic cone of the larger Lake Kussharo caldera. The eruption that created the current caldera occurred around 7,000 years ago. The last eruption was a plinian eruption about 2,000 years ago that dropped pumice over the region.

Mashū volcano is rated with a Volcanic Explosivity Index of 6, the third highest among large volcanoes.

Two volcanoes have grown out of the Mashū caldera. Kamuishu Island, a lava dome which rises from the middle of the lake, is one. The other is Mount Kamui, a stratovolcano with lava dome, which forms the highest point on the eastern shore. A third volcano neighbors Kamuinupuri. It is Mount Nishibetsu. Mount Nishibetsu probably predates the caldera.

The main rock type of the volcanoes is andesite and dacite. The rock is non-alkali pyroclastic flow or mafic rock, dating from the Late Pleistocene to the Holocene. Some rock around the Mashū crater and Mount Nishibetsu is older still, dating from the Middle Pleistocene.

The following table lists the eruptions of the Mashū volcano and Kamuinupuri.

Volcano	Date of eruption	Dating technique	VEI	Tephra volume	Type
Mashū	7400 BC ± 200 years	Corrected radiocarbon	4	440,000,000 cubic metres (0.11 mi^{3})	Explosive eruption
Mashū	6600 BC ± 50 years	Corrected radiocarbon	6	11,000,000,000 cubic metres (2.6 mi^{3})	Explosive eruption of the central vent with pyroclastic flow and caldera collapse
Mount Kamui	2750 BC ± 100 years	Corrected radiocarbon			Explosive eruption of a flank vent
Mount Kamui	1400 BC ± 100 years	Corrected radiocarbon			Explosive eruption of a flank vent
Mount Kamui	100 BC ± 500 years	Tephrochronology			Explosive eruption
Mount Kamui	300 AD ± 75 years	Corrected radiocarbon			Explosive eruption
Mount Kamui	970 AD ± 100 years	Uncorrected radiocarbon	5	1,000,000,000 cubic metres (0.24 mi^{3})	Explosive eruption of a flank vent and caldera collapse

== Flora and fauna ==
The lake is inhabited by phytoplankton and zooplankton.

- Melosira spp.
- Synedra sp.
- Daphnia longispina
- Bosmina coregoni

Sockeye salmon and rainbow trout have been introduced to the lake.

On the slopes around and above the lake grow a mixture of evergreen forest with Picea jezoensis and Abies sachalinensis and birch forest with Betula ermanii.

== Economy ==
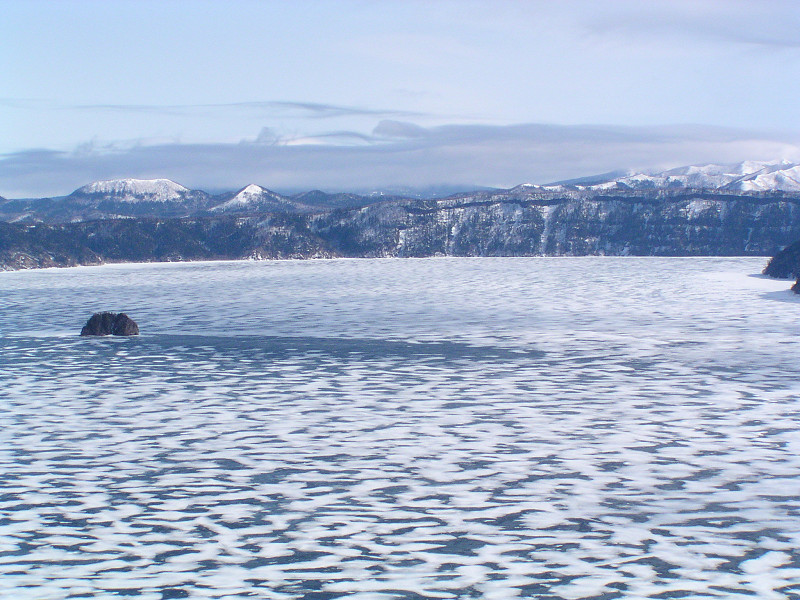
Lake Mashū in the winter

The Mashu-dake Hiking Course is a trail that goes along the crater rim and to the top of Mount Mashū. The trail leads through forest and grassland for about seven kilometers and takes about 2.5 to 3 hours to hike one way. There are no settlements along the shores of the lake. Access to the lakeshore itself is prohibited by the Ministry of the Environment (Japan). Visitors may only view the lake from the designated observation towers.

== In popular culture ==
Sendoff Spring in Pokémon Diamond and Pearl and Pokémon Platinum is based on this lake as the Sinnoh region is a fictionalized version of Hokkaido.

== See also ==
- Tourism in Japan
- List of lakes in Japan
