= Mount Mokoto =

Mountain and dormant volcano in Hokkaido, Japan

- 藻琴山
- Location within Hokkaido

Highest point
- Elevation: 1,000 m (3,300 ft)
- Prominence: 545 m (1,788 ft)
- Coordinates: 43°42′18″N 144°19′53″E

Geography
- Location: Hokkaido, Japan

Mount Mokoto (藻琴山, Mokotoyama) is a dormant volcano in Akan Mashu National Park, in eastern Hokkaido. It is located on the north side of Lake Kussharo and straddles the towns of Koshimizu, Teshikaga, Ozora, and Bihoro.
