= Mount Iō (Akan) =

Volcano on the island of Hokkaido, Japan

- 硫黄山
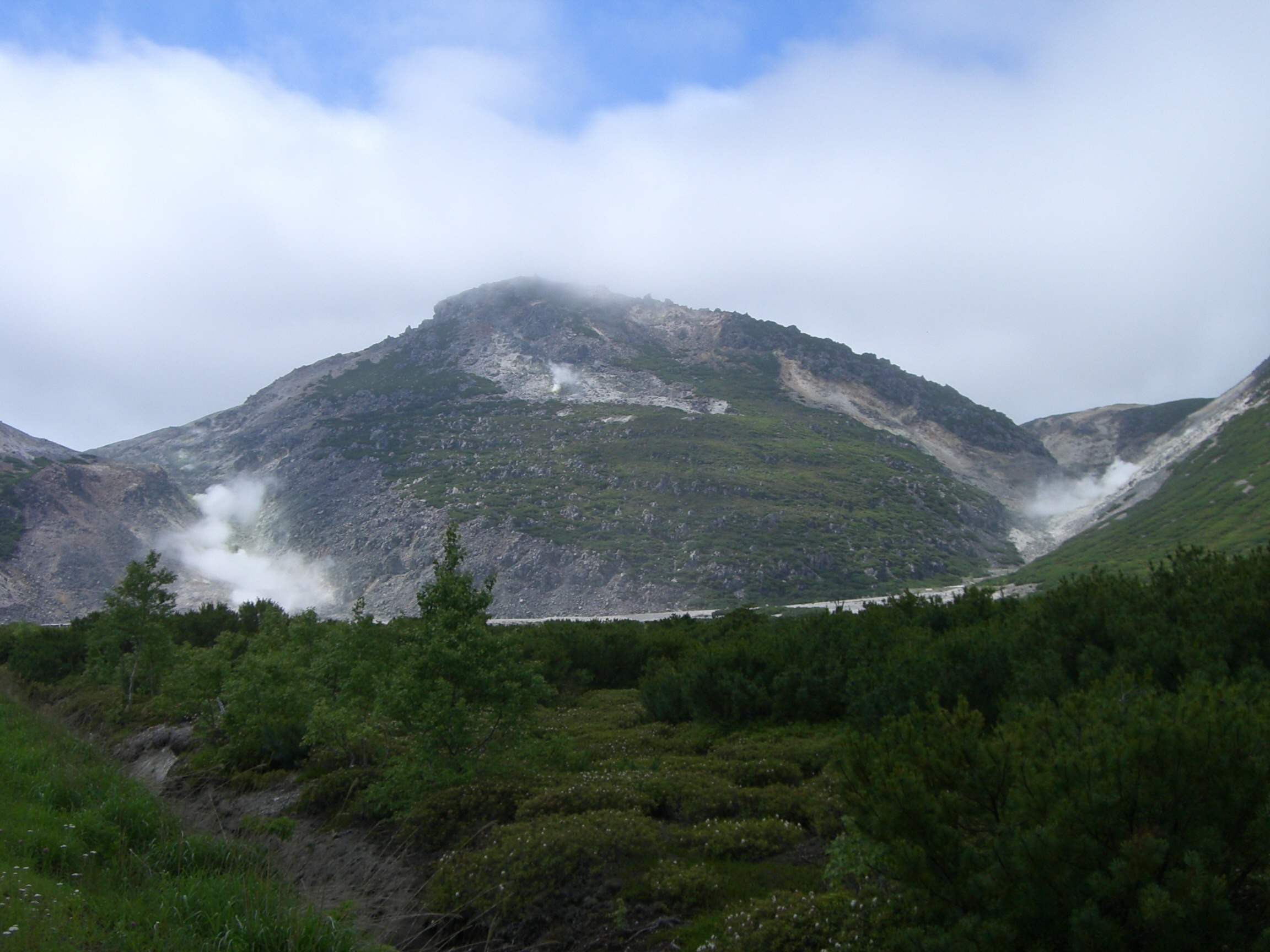
- Mount Iō, also known as Atosa-nupuri (July 2009)

Highest point
- Elevation: 508 m (1,667 ft)
- Prominence: 130 m (430 ft)
- Parent peak: Mount Kabuto
- Listing: List of mountains and hills of Japan by height
- Coordinates: 43°36′37″N 144°26′19″E

Naming
- English translation: Sulphur Mountain
- Language of name: Japanese

Geography
- Location within Japan Location within Hokkaido
- Location: Hokkaidō, Japan
- Parent range: Akan Volcanic Complex
- Topo map(s): Geographical Survey Institute, 25000:1 川湯, 50000:1 斜里

Geology
- Mountain type: volcanic
- Volcanic arc: Kuril arc

Mount Iō (硫黄山, Iō-zan) is a volcano in the Akan Volcanic Complex of Hokkaidō, Japan. It sits within the borders of the town of Teshikaga.

The mountain was once mined for sulphur, hence its name. To the Ainu the mountain was known as Atosa-nupuri (naked mountain). The mountain is quite bare. Despite its bareness and being a rather low mountain at 508 metres (1,667 ft) it hosts alpine plant life. It hosts colonies of Siberian Dwarf Pine, Rhododendron diversipilosum, and other members of Ericaceae.

== Gallery ==
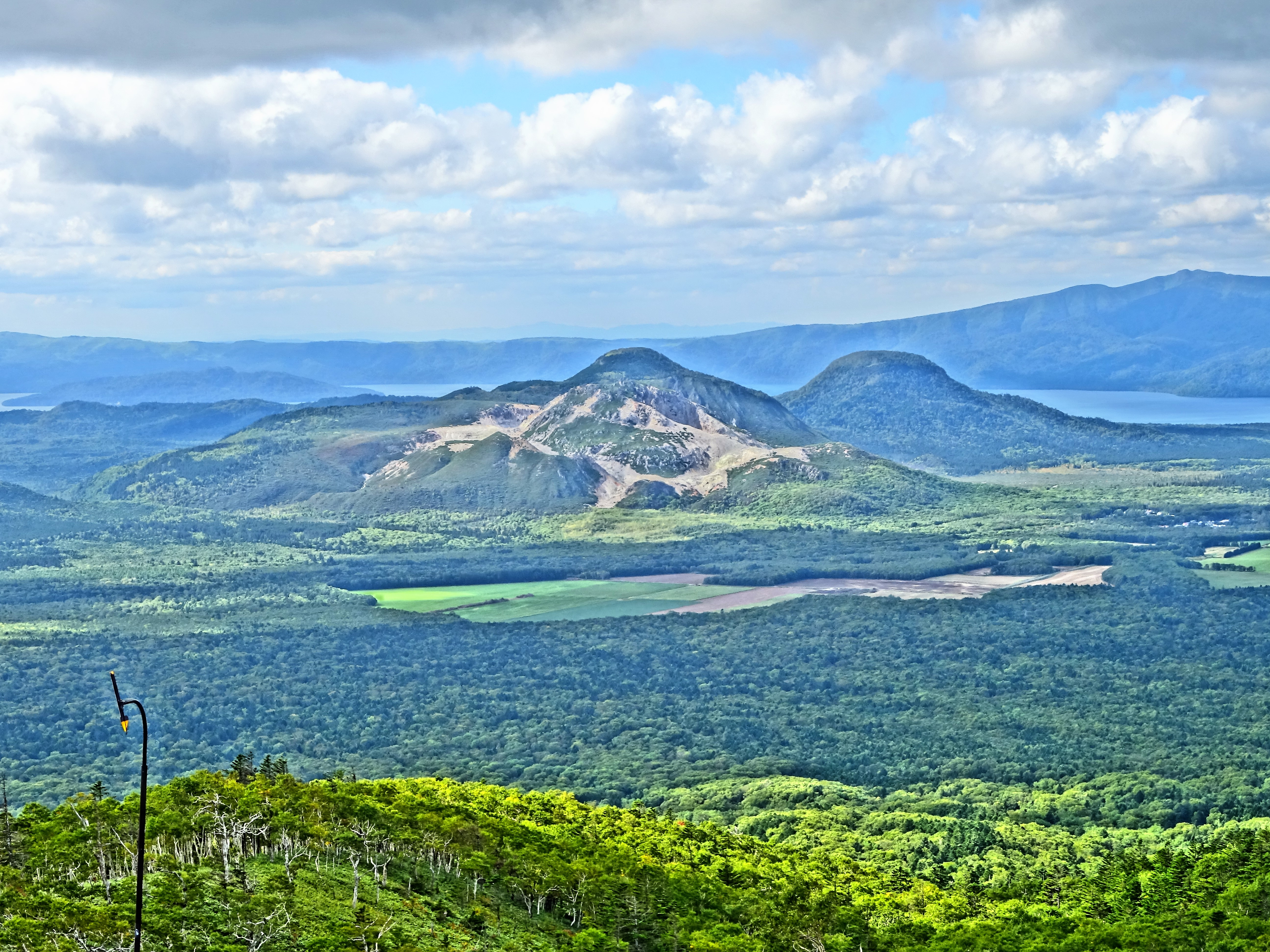
Distant view

Fumaroles

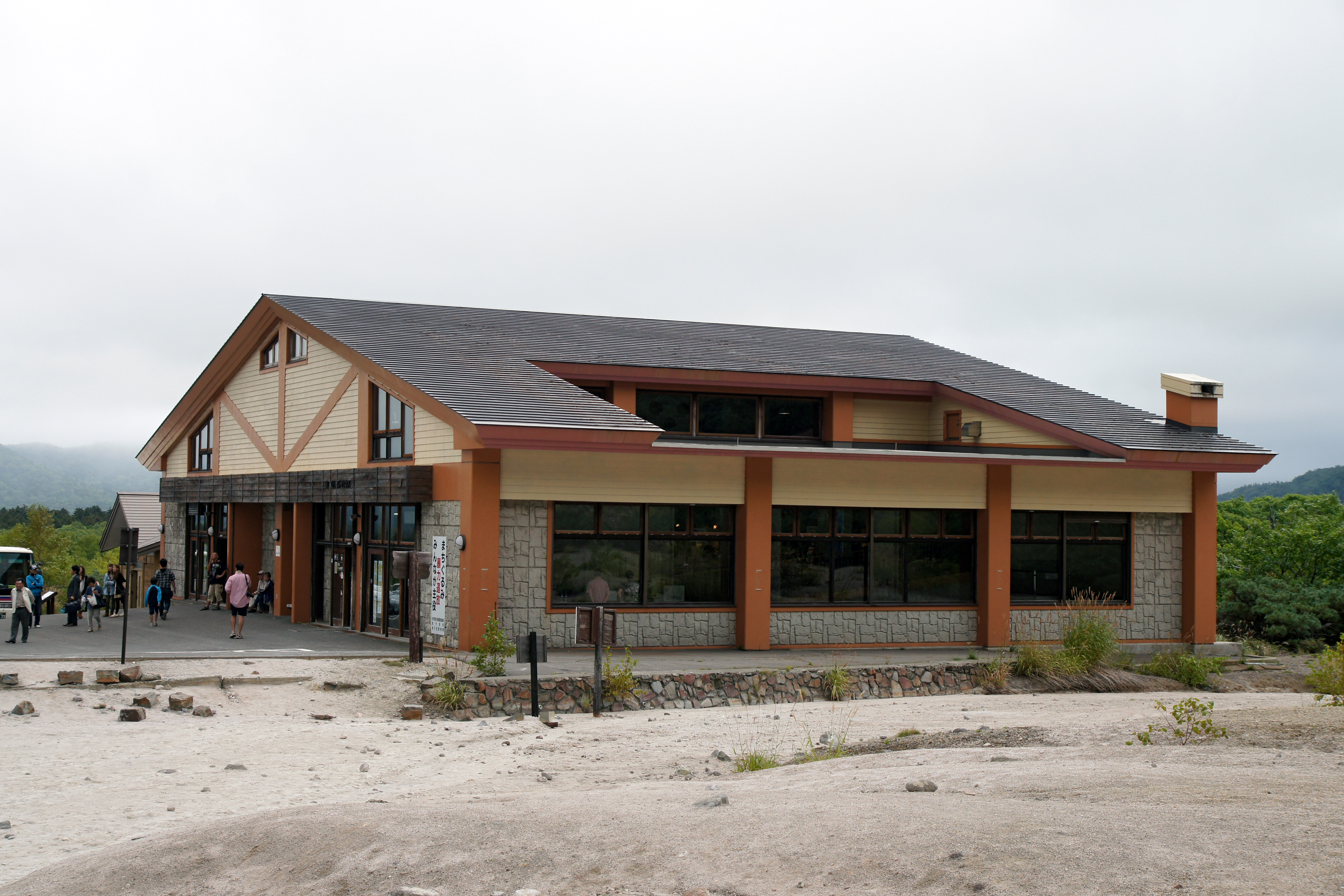
Visitor center

== See also ==
- List of volcanoes in Japan
- List of mountains in Japan
