= Akana (surname) =

Akana is the surname of the following people:

- Akaiko Akana (1884–1933), Hawaiian pastor
- Anna Akana (born 1989), American YouTuber, filmmaker, producer, actress, comedian, and model
- Bernard Akana (1920/1921–1990), American engineer and politician
- Funhouse (Makana "Maka" Akana), a Marvel Comics supervillain
- Paula Akana, Hawaiian journalist
- Ron Akana (1928–2025), American flight attendant
