= Akana, Gabon =

Akana
- town
- Location in Gabon
- Coordinates: 0°28′0″N 12°22′0″E
- Country: Gabon
- Province: Ogooué-Ivindo

Akana is a small town in Ogooué-Ivindo Province, north central Gabon.
