= Achan =

Achan may refer to:

- Achan (title), a title traditionally adopted by some feudal landlords in southern India
- Achan (biblical figure), a person in the Book of Joshua
- Achan (1952 film), a 1952 Malayalam film starring Prem Nazir and B. S. Saroja
- Achan (2011 film), a 2011 Malayalam film starring Thilakan
