= Akan Volcanic Complex =

Volcanic complex that grew out of the Akan caldera

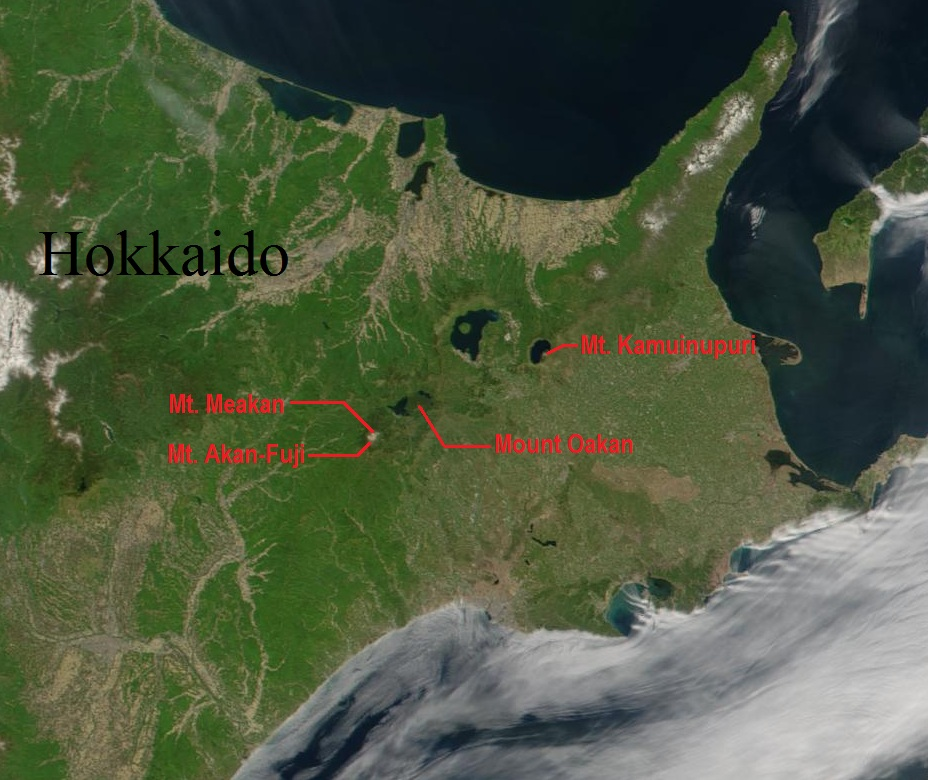
- Mount Meakan, Akan-Fuji and Mount Oakan on a satellite image of Eastern Hokkaido

Highest point
- Peak: Mount Meakan
- Elevation: 1,499 m (4,918 ft)
- Coordinates: 43°23′11″N 144°00′32″E

Naming
- Native name: 阿寒岳 (Japanese); Akan-dake (Japanese)

Geography
- Location within Japan Location within Hokkaido
- Country: Japan
- State: Hokkaidō
- Subprefectures: Kushiro and Tokachi
- Districts: Ashoro District and Shiranuka District
- Municipalities: Ashoro, Kushiro and Shiranuka

Geology
- Orogeny: island arc
- Rock type: Volcanic
- Last eruption: November 2008

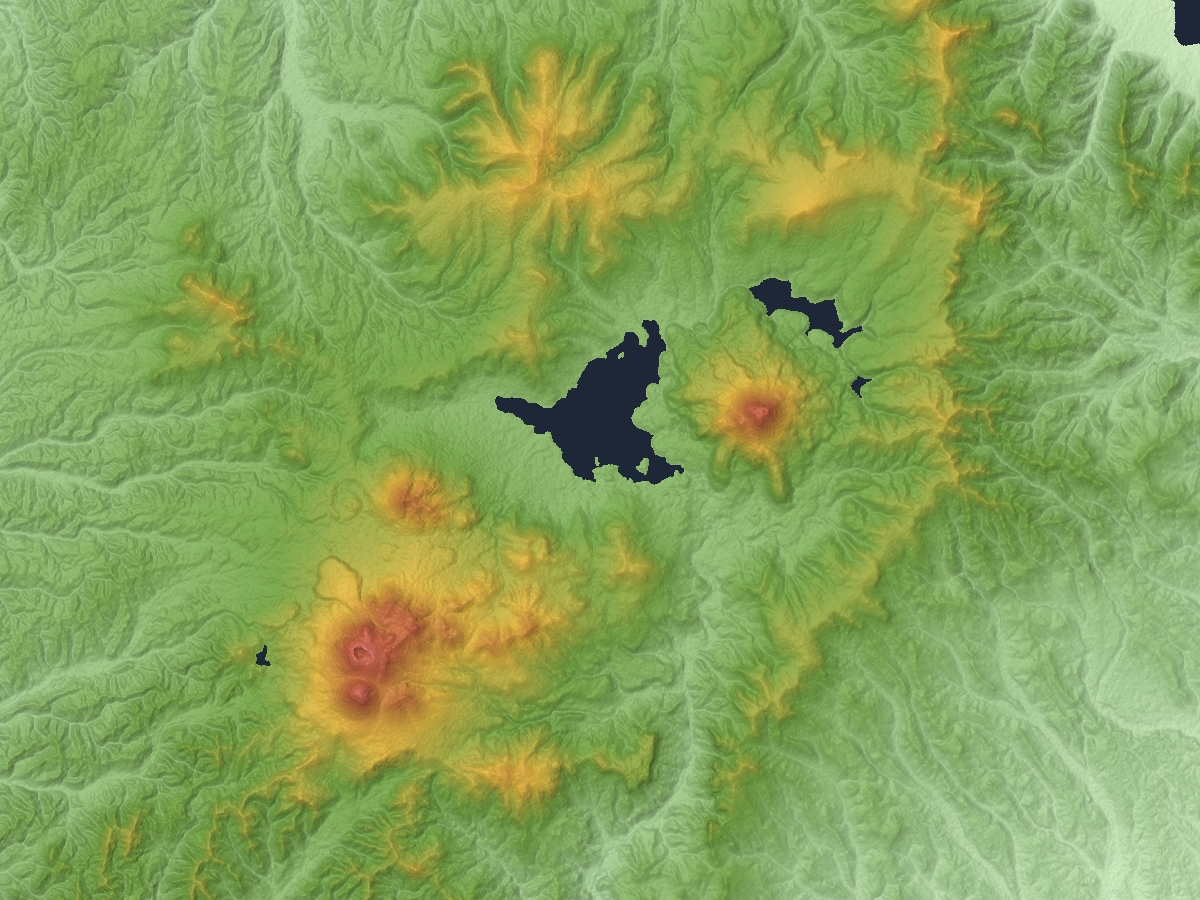
Akan Caldera Me-Akan (bottom left) O-Akan (center right)

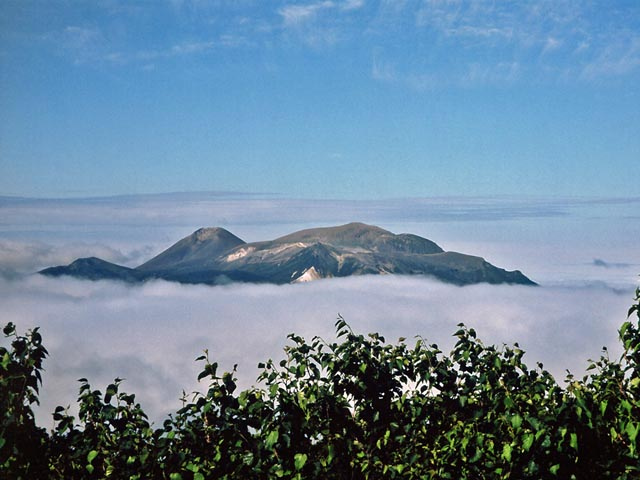
Mount Meakan and Akan Fuji from Mount Oakan (July 2008).

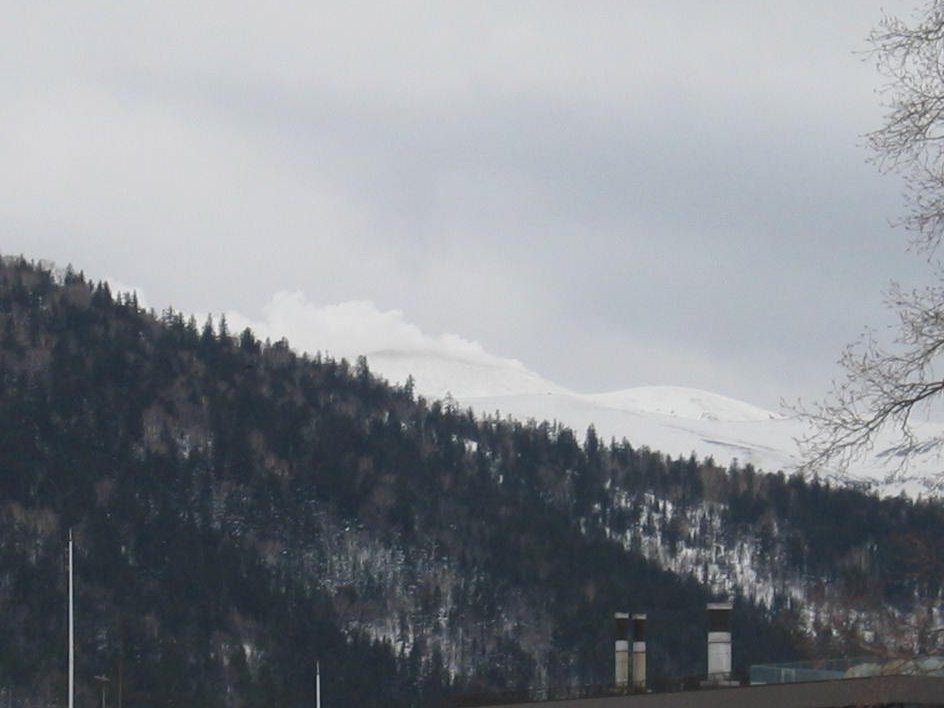
Vapor rising from Mount Meakan, seen from the lakeside of Lake Akan.

Akan Volcanic Complex is a volcanic group of volcanoes that grew out of the Akan caldera. It is located within Akan National Park, about 50 km Northwest of Kushiro in eastern Hokkaidō, Japan.

== Description ==
A number of peaks are arranged around the rim of Lake Akan (a.k.a. Akan-ko), which fills a 24×13 km caldera, the tallest being Me-Akan (Meakan), O-Akan (Oakan) and Akan-Fuji.

Oakan is prominently located at the northeast side of the caldera, while Meakan occupies the opposite, southwest side, in a cluster of nine stratovolcanoes that include Akan-Fuji, one of many symmetrical Japanese volcanoes named after the renowned Mount Fuji, and Fuppushi volcano (a.k.a. Fuppushi-dake, not to be confused with Mount Fuppushi, which is located in Southwestern Hokkaido).

== Volcanology ==
The Akan caldera was formed 31,500 years ago. Its elongated shape is due to its incremental formation during major explosive eruptions, from the early to the mid-Pleistocene periods.

The Nakamachineshiri crater of Meakan volcano was formed during a major eruption about 13,500 years ago.

The Me-Akan group of nine overlapping cones on the eastern side of Lake Akan has had mild eruptions since the beginning of the 19th century. The last eruption of this historical volcano was in 2008.

Oakan, Meakan, Furebetsu and Fuppushi are the major post-caldera volcanoes of the Akan volcanic complex.

Me-Akan is one of the most active volcanoes of Hokkaido. Its summit contains the active craters of Ponmachineshiri and Naka-Machineshiri, sites of frequent phreatic eruptions in historical time. Akan-Fuji and O-Akan have not erupted in historical time.

Akan is rated with a volcanic explosivity index of 4 on the Smithsonian VEI scale, the scale's fourth-highest score, based on the volcano's largest known eruption, around 7050 BC.

Following are prominent features of Akan:

=== Cones ===
- Me-Akan-Dake (Mount Meakan) (1499 m) Stratovolcano
- Akan Fuji (Akan-Fuji, Akan-Huji) (1476 m) Stratovolcano
- Kita-Yama (1400 m) Cone
- O-Akan-Dake (Mount Oakan) (1371 m) Stratovolcano
- Kenga-Mine Cone 1336 m
- Nishi-Yama (Nisi-Yama) (1300 m) Cone
- Fuppushi (Huppusi) (1226 m) Stratovolcano
- Miname-Dake (1217 m) Stratovolcano
- Higashi-Dake (Higasi-Dake) (1140 m) Cone
- Furebetsu (Hurebetu) (1098 m) Stratovolcano
- Kobu-Yama Cone
- Futatsu-Dake Pyroclastic cone

=== Craters ===
- Nakamachineshiri (Nakamatineshiri) Crater
- Ponmachineshiri (Ponmatinesiri) Crater

=== Thermal features ===
- Akan-Kohan Thermal Feature

=== Other peaks ===
- Mount Ken
- Mount Ahoro
