= Əhən =

- Municipality
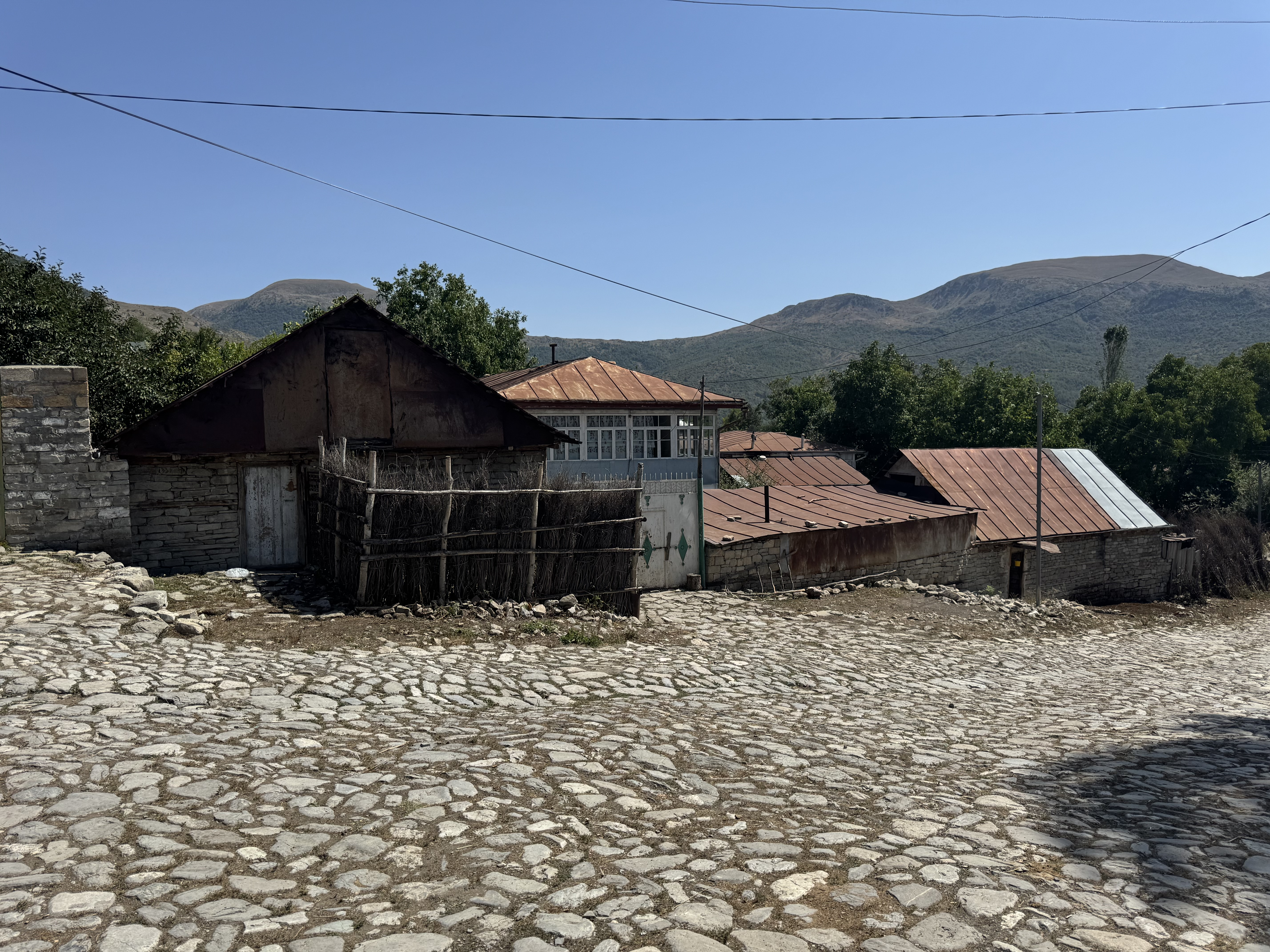

- Location within Azerbaijan
- Coordinates: 40°51′16″N 48°25′19″E
- Country: Azerbaijan
- Rayon: Ismailli

Population
  - Total: 573
- Time zone: UTC+4 (AZT)
  - Summer (DST): UTC+5 (AZT)

Əhən (also, Agan and Akhan) is a village and municipality in the Ismailli Rayon of Azerbaijan. It has a population of 573. The municipality consists of the villages of Əhən, Duvaryan, and Ximran.
