= Akan Mashu National Park =

National park in Hokkaido, Japan

- 阿寒摩周国立公園
- IUCN category V (protected landscape/seascape)
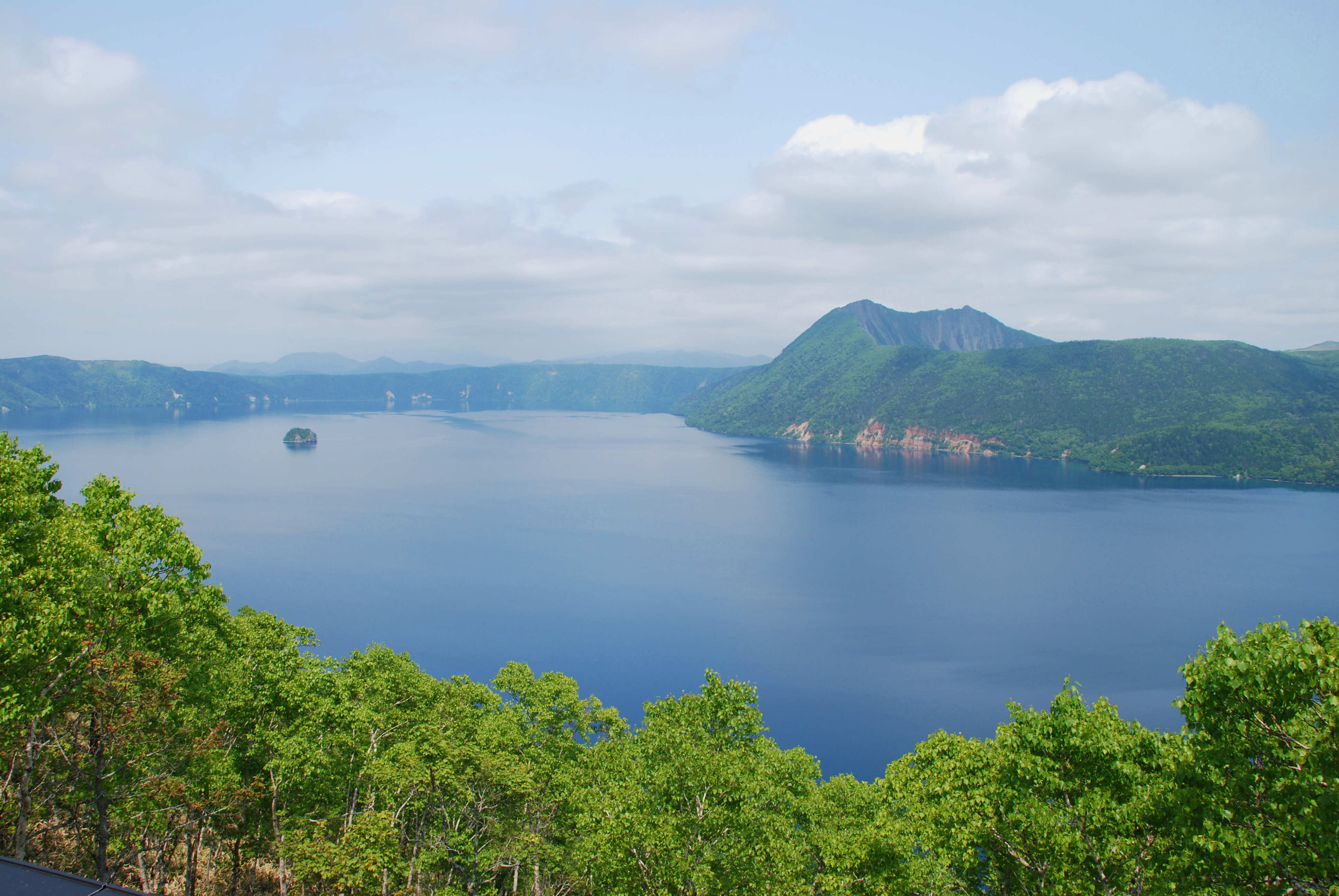
- Lake Mashū (2008)

- Location within Hokkaido Location within Japan
- Location: Hokkaido, Japan
- Nearest city: Teshikaga
- Coordinates: 43°32′40″N 144°17′1″E
- Area: 914.13 km^{2} (352.95 sq mi)
- Established: December 4, 1934
- Governing body: Ministry of the Environment

Akan Mashu National Park (阿寒摩周国立公園, Akan Mashū Kokuritsu Kōen) is a national park located on the island of Hokkaido, Japan. Along with Daisetsuzan National Park, these are the two oldest national parks in Hokkaido. The park was established December 4, 1934.

Akan is an area of volcanic craters and forests, covering 90,481 hectares (904.81 km^{2}). The park is famous for its crystal clear lakes, its hot springs, and its large marimo. It is the only place where marimo of appreciable size form naturally in Japan.

== Sites ==
The park can be divided into two general areas, Kawayu and Akan.

=== Kawayu ===
Mount Iō and the Kawayu Onsen offer natural hotsprings and sulphur fumaroles. Around Lake Kussharo, a caldera lake, are Bihoro Pass, Mount Mokoto, and Mount Nishibetsu. At the lake, Wakoto Peninsula is an area with high ground temperatures and uniquely adapted wildlife. Lake Mashū is a caldera lake. It is one of the clearest lakes in the world with visibility up to 40 meters.

=== Akan ===
Akan Caldera is a large caldera over 20 km across. Emerging from within caldera is the Akan Volcanic Complex, which includes the highest mountain in the park, Mount Meakan. The lake also features boiling mud, called bokke. Churui island is one of four islands in the lake and the site of the Marimo Exhibition and Observation Center. Lake Onnetō is at the foot of Mount Meakan. Nearby is a hot water waterfall, Onnetō Yu-no-taki. From Sokodai, one can observe Lake Penketo and Lake Panketo. Mount Hakuto Observatory, Mount Kikin, Tsurumi Pass, and Akan Lakeside Observatory offer panoramas of the surrounding countryside. On the Akan River people view the mouth of the river Takiguchi as it flows into Lake Akan from Takimi Bridge. The area also offers Lake Jiro and Lake Taro.
