= Teshikaga Airfield =

Airstrip in Teshikaga, Hokkaido, Japan

Coordinates: 43°28′49″N 144°26′08″E

Teshikaga Airfield was an airstrip adjoining the town of Teshikaga in Hokkaido, Japan.

It had a 700 metres (2,300 ft) gravel runway, a terminal building, and a large hangar.

It was reported closed in 2009.

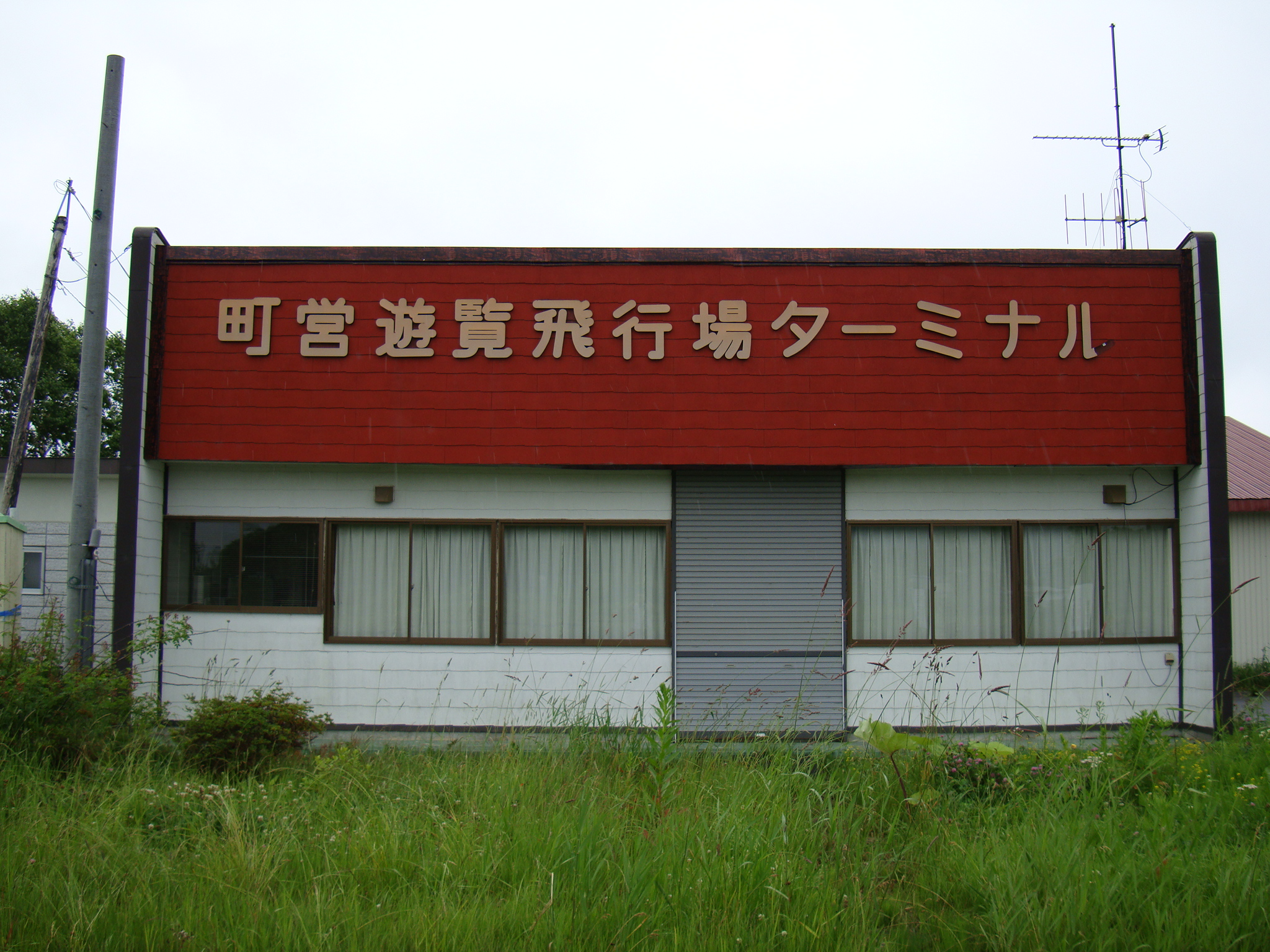
Teshikaga Airport was not used after September 2007, and was abolished in September 2009.

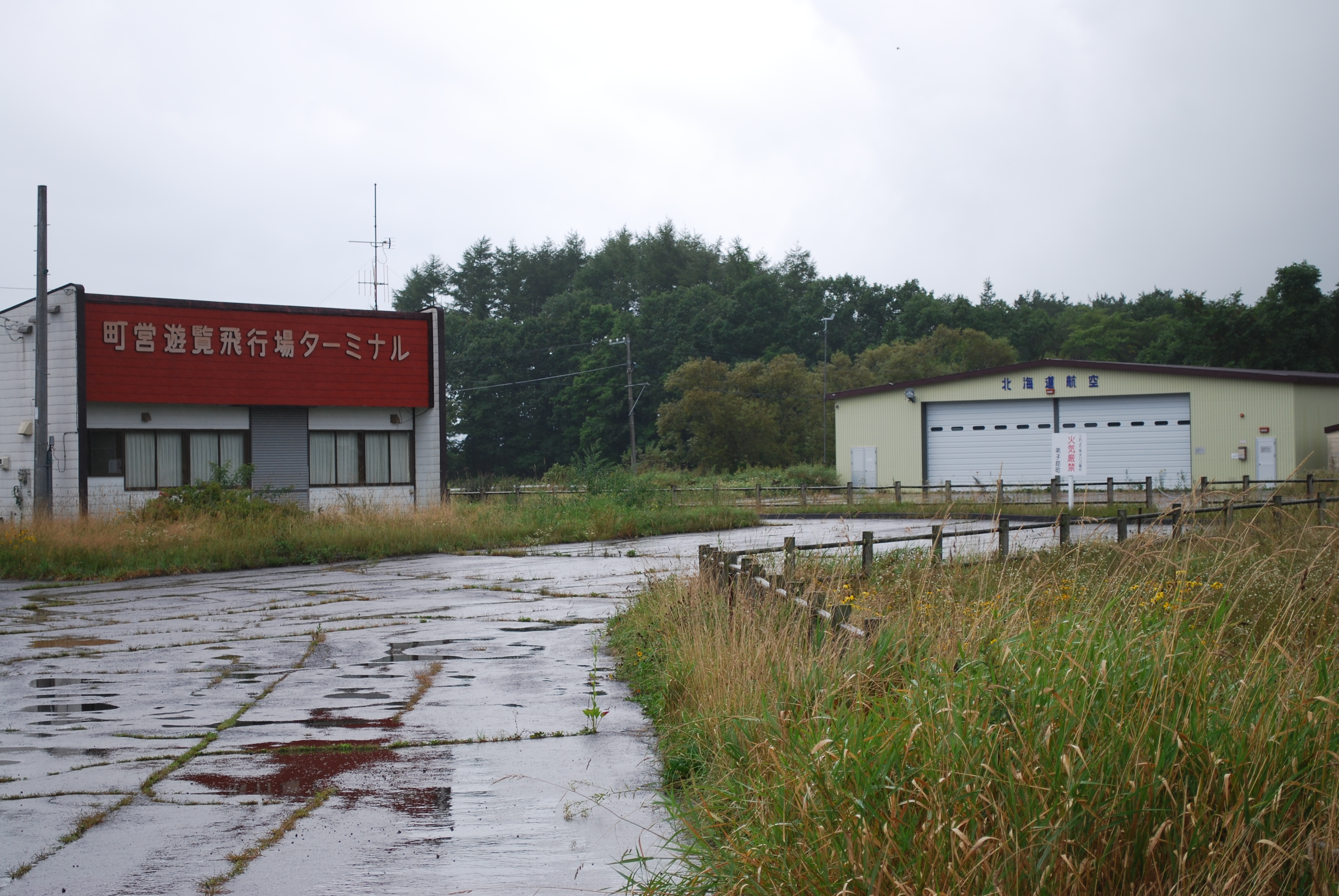

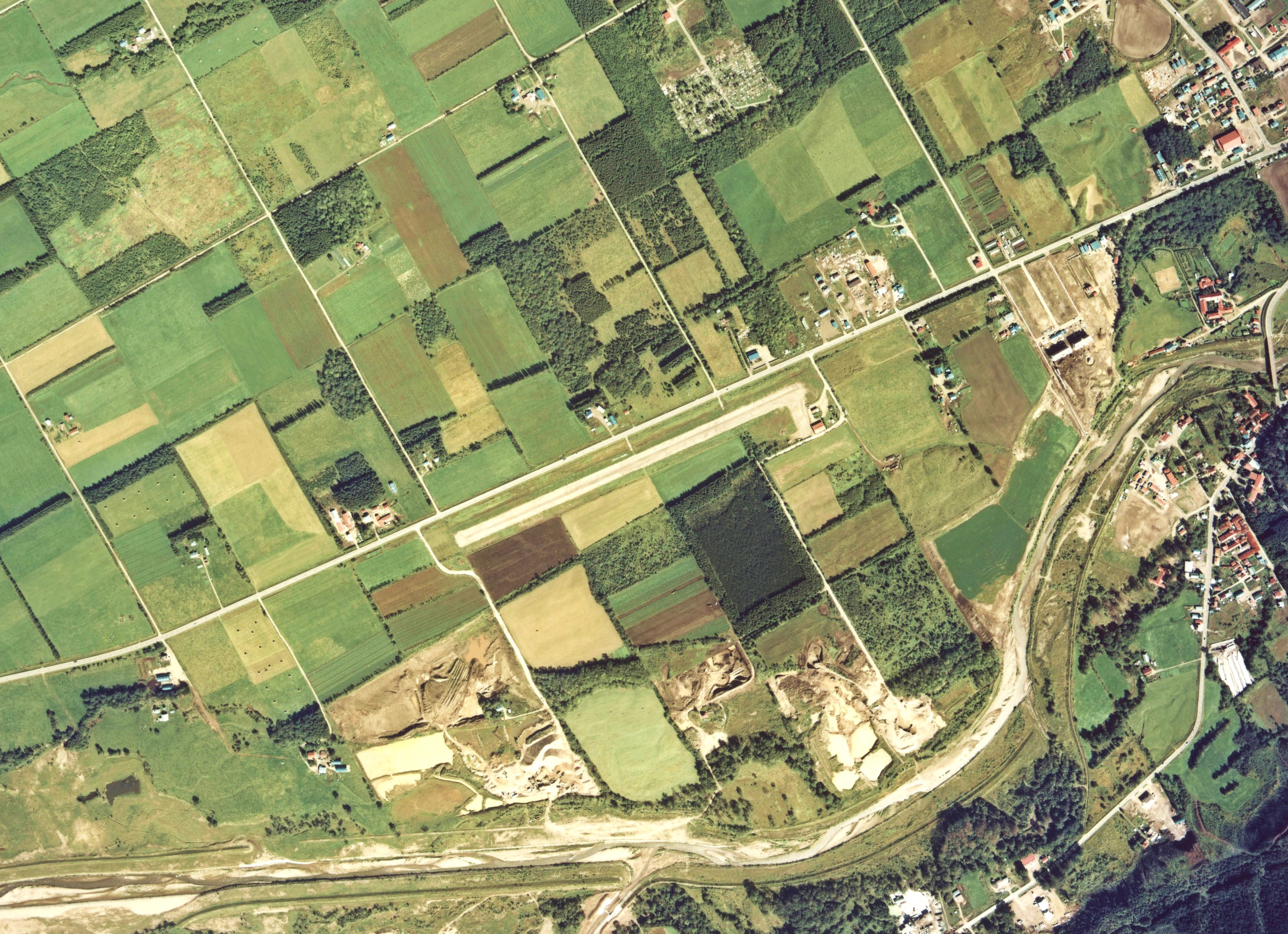
弟子屈飛行場付近の空中写真。（1977年撮影）。
(aerial photography)

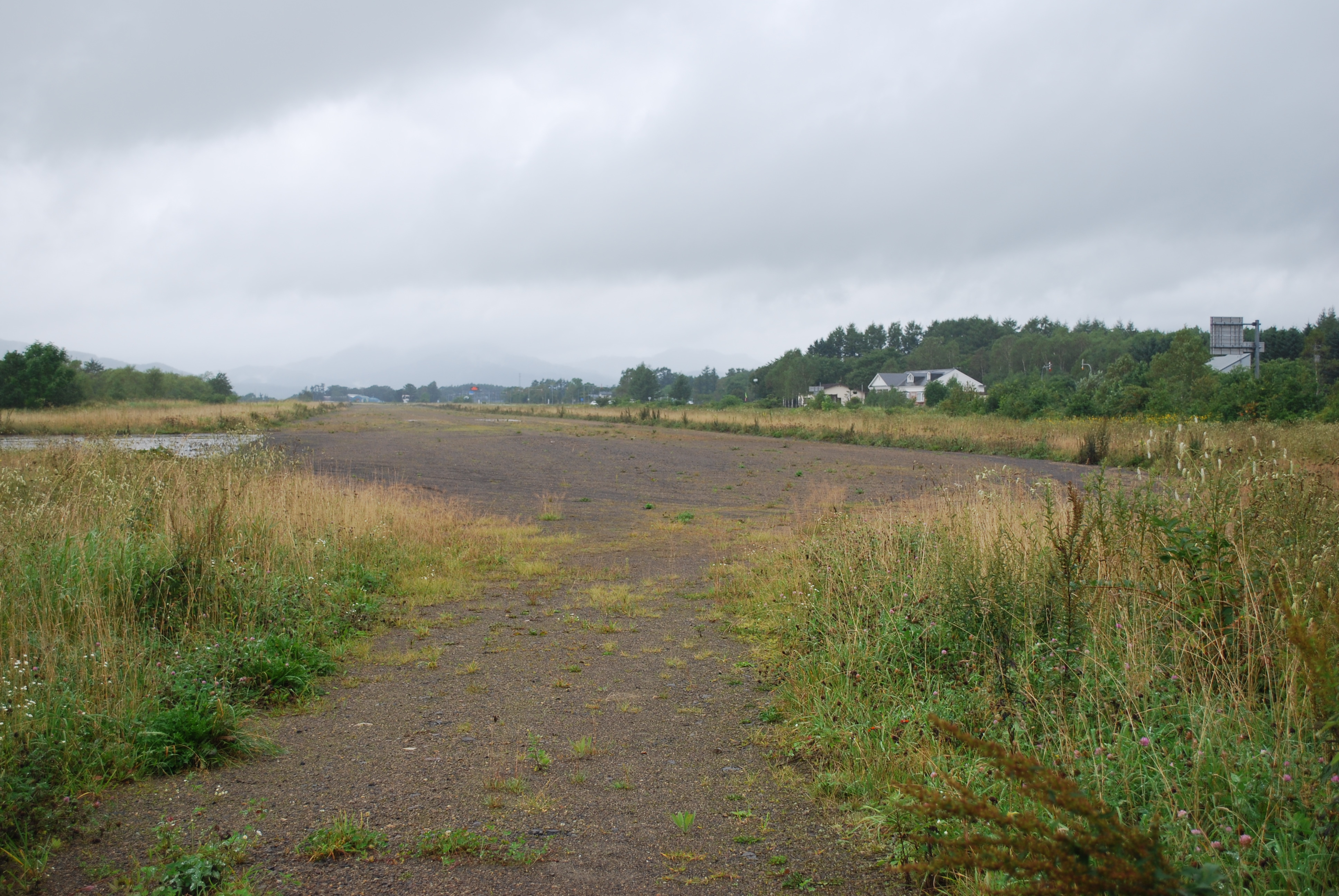
未舗装の滑走路
