= Kawayu-Onsen Station =

Railway station in Teshikaga, Hokkaido, Japan

B66 Kawayu-Onsen Station 川湯温泉駅
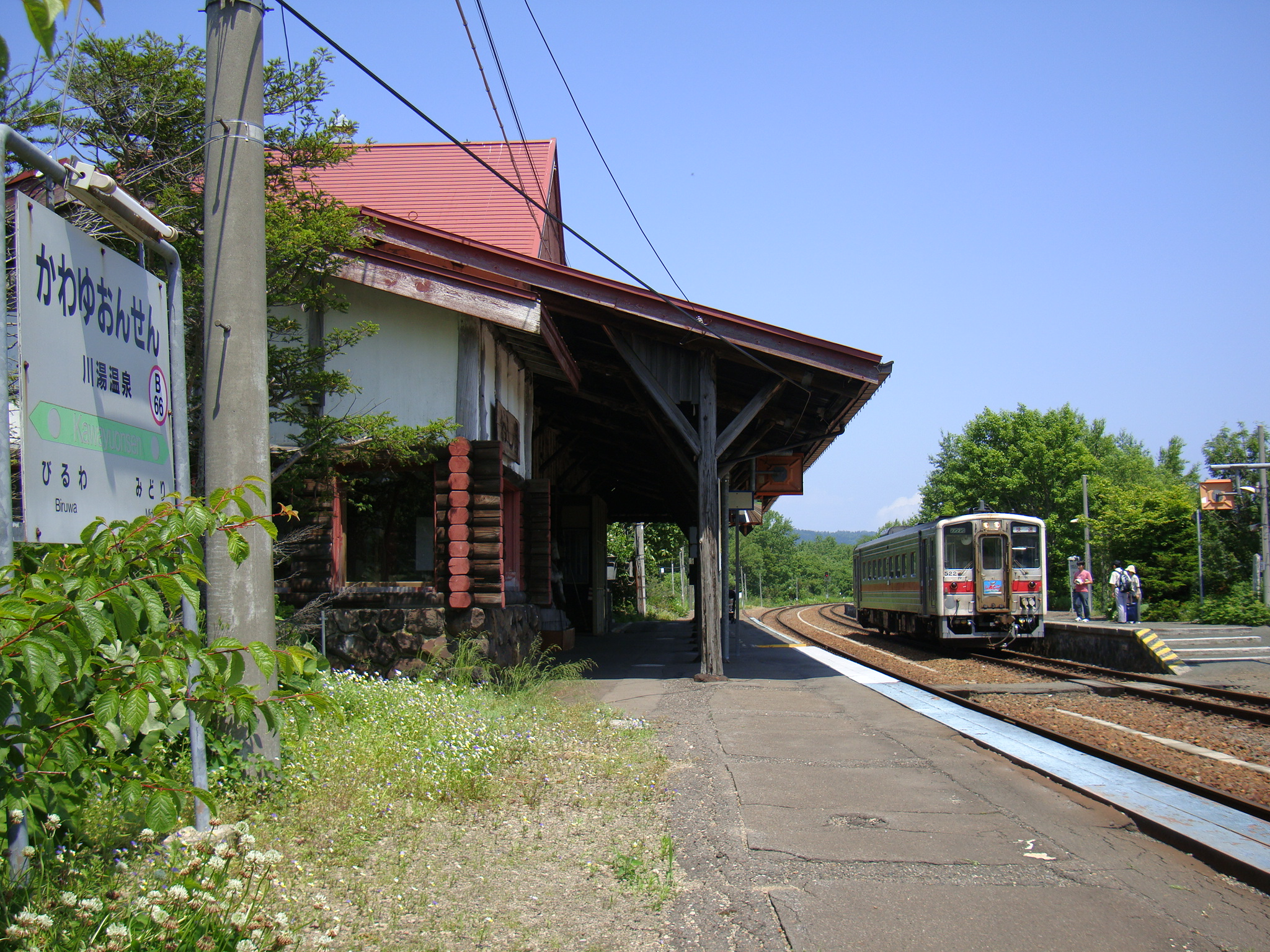
- Kawayu-Onsen Station platform

General information
- Location: 1-chōme-1 Kawayu Ekimae, Teshikaga, Kawakami District, Hokkaido 088-3462; Japan
- Coordinates: 43°36′59.22″N 144°27′29.19″E
- System: regional rail
- Operator: JR Hokkaido
- Line: Senmō Main Line
- Distance: 86.4 km from Higashi-Kushiro
- Platforms: 2 side platforms
- Tracks: 2

Other information
- Status: Unattended
- Station code: B66
- Website: Official website

History
- Opened: 20 April 1930; 96 years ago

Passengers
- FY2022: 13 daily

Services
Preceding station	JR Hokkaido	Following station
Midori towards Abashiri	Senmō Main Line Local	Biruwa towards Kushiro
Location
- Location within Hokkaido Location within Japan

Kawayu-Onsen Station (川湯温泉駅, Kawayu-Onsen-eki) is a railway station located in the town of Teshikaga, Hokkaidō, Japan. It is operated by JR Hokkaido.

== Lines ==
The station is served by the Senmō Main Line, and lies 86.4 km from the starting point of the line at Higashi-Kushiro .

== Layout ==
Kawayu-Onsen Station has two opposed side platforms. It previously had a combined two-platform and three-track system, consisting of both single and island platforms. Platform 3, the furthest from the station building, is currently unused and used for storing snowplows and construction vehicles. A level crossing is used to move between platforms. The station also has sidings and a garage, primarily used to store snowplows used in winter. The wooden station building, built in a half-timbered mountain cabin style using yew logs, features a VIP room due to the nearby Imperial Estate. A footbath is also located adjacent to the station building. The station is unattended.

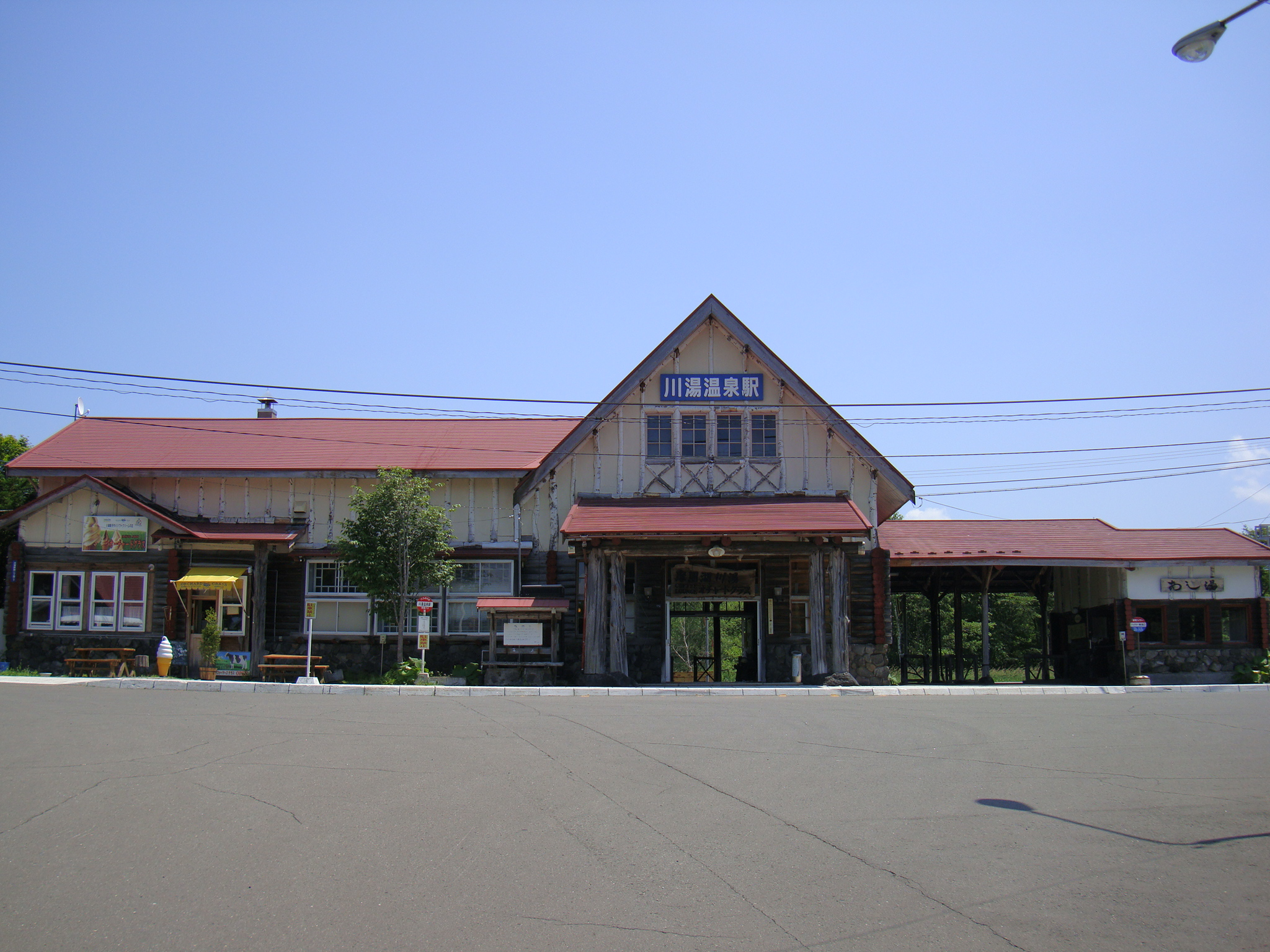
Kawayu-Onsen station building

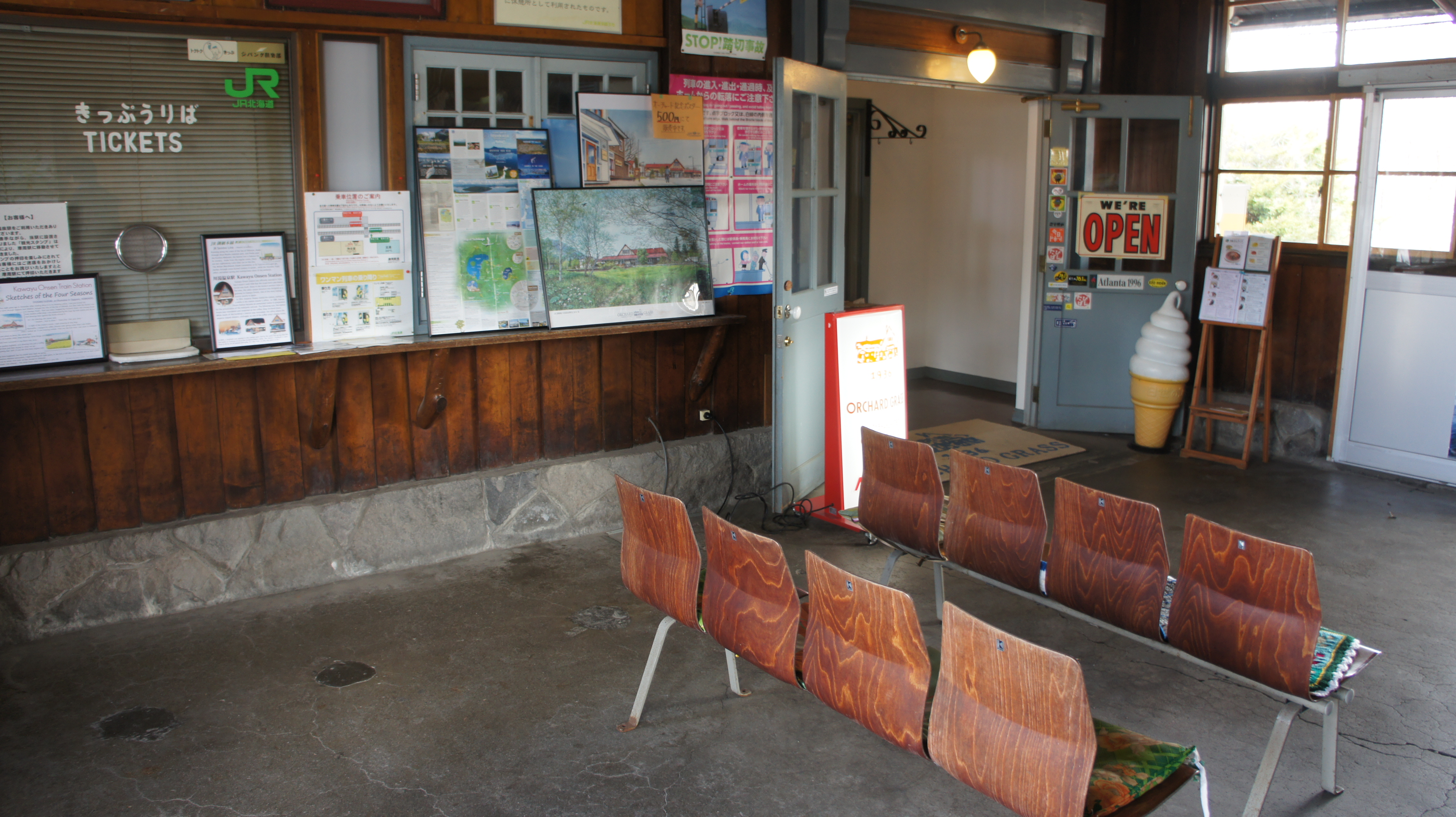
Waiting room

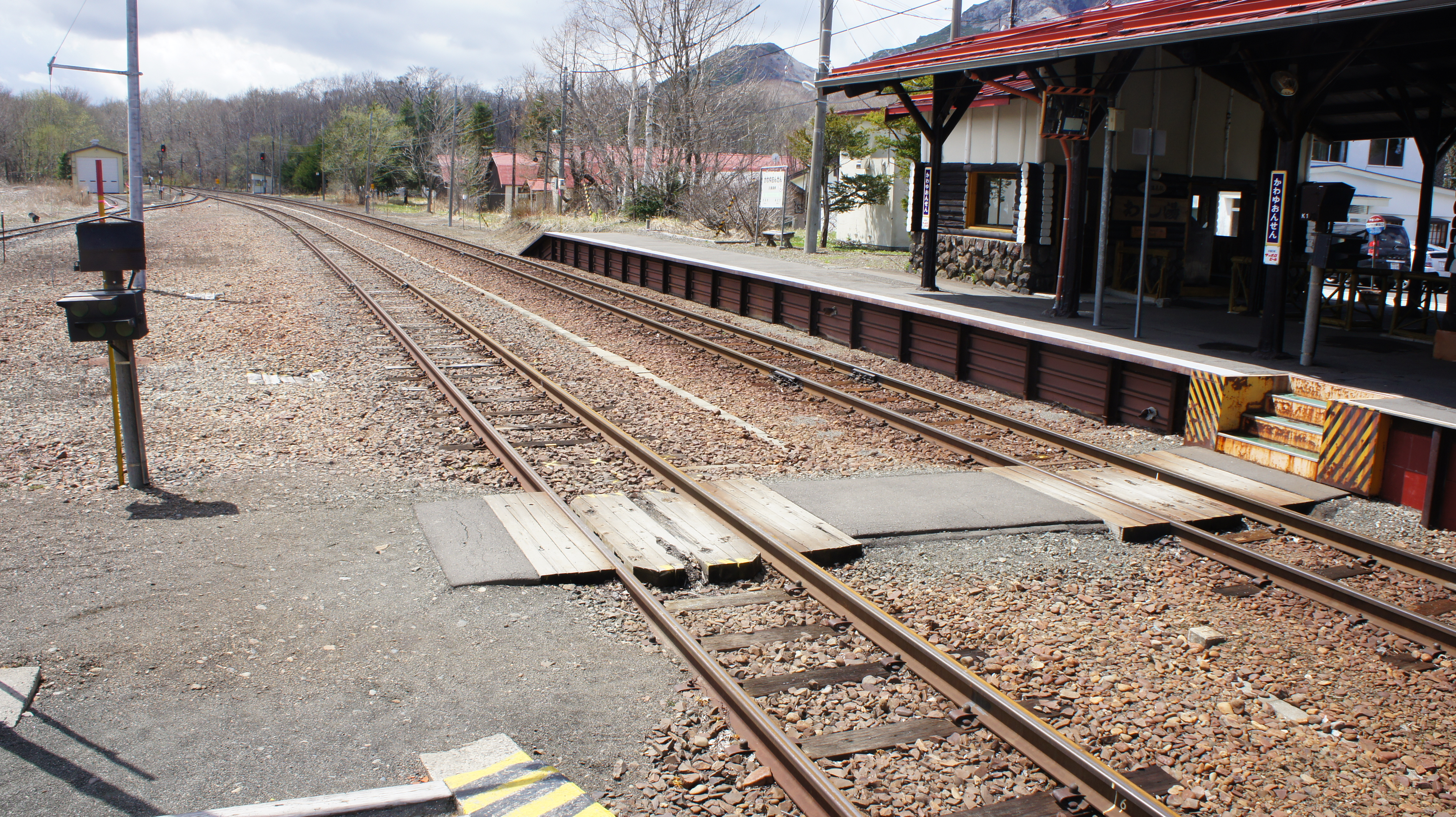
Platform

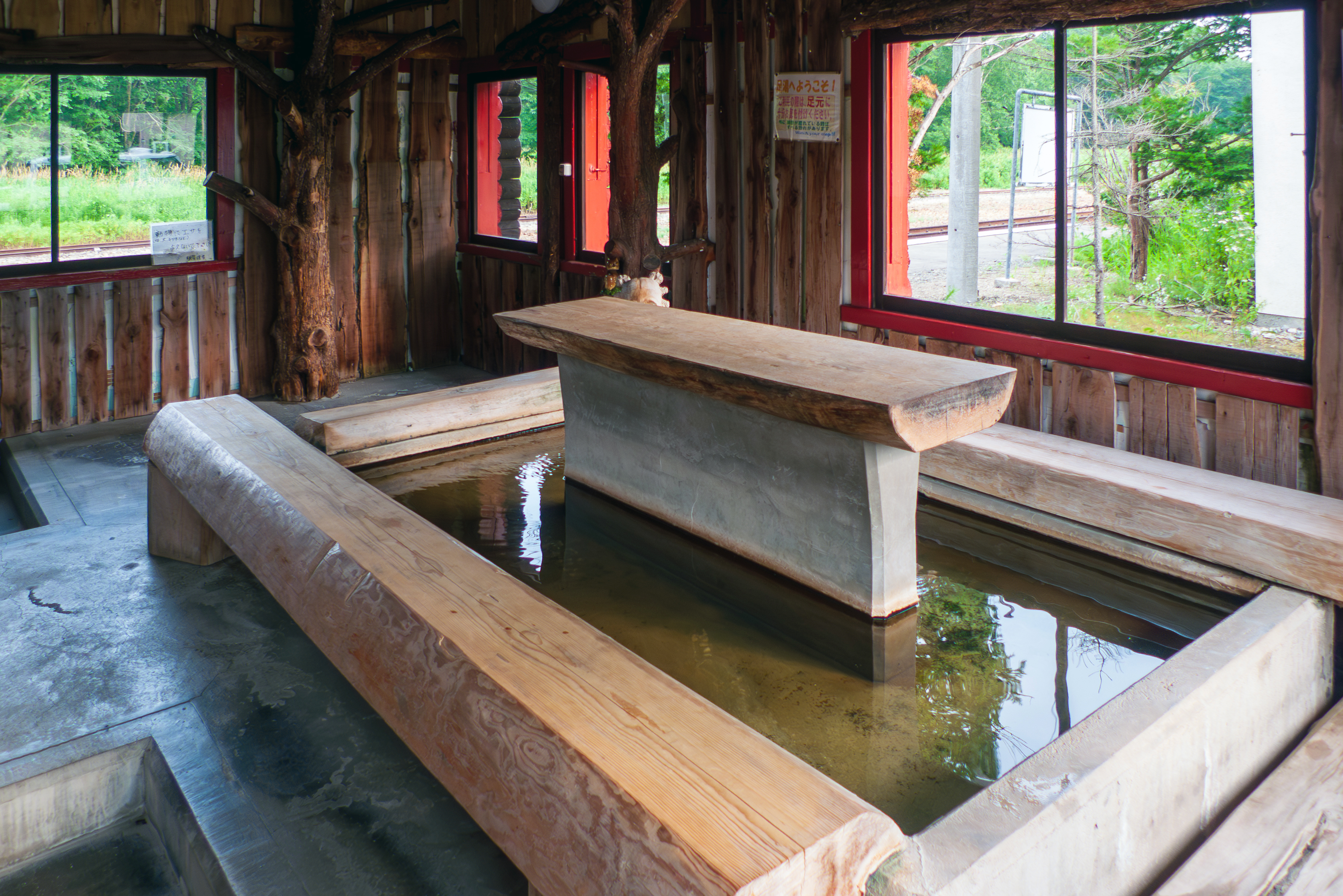
Footbath

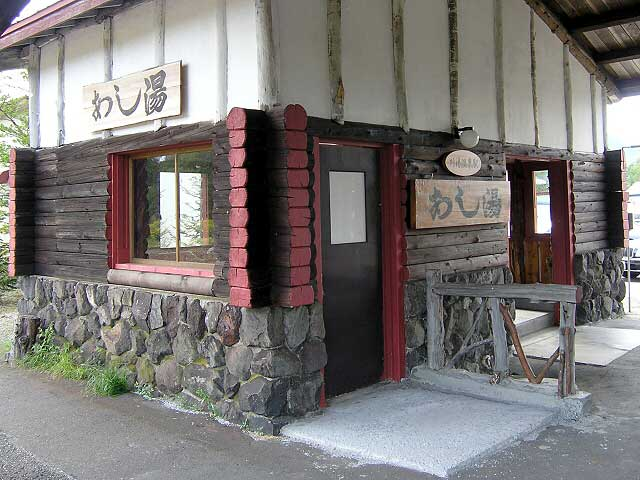
Footbath exterior

== History ==
The station opened on 20 April 1930 on the Japanese Government Railways Senmō Main Line. The present station building was completed in 1936. Following the privatization of the Japanese National Railways on 1 April 1987, the station came under the control of JR Hokkaido. The statin was renamed to its present name on 13 March 1988.

== Passenger statistics ==
In fiscal 2022, the station was used by an average of 13 passengers daily.

== Surrounding area ==
The hot spring town is located about 4 kilometers from the station, and buses connect with the trains. The station is also the gateway to Akan Mashu National Park.

- Hokkaido Highway 422 Kawayu Station Line
- Japan National Route 391

Kawayu Hot Springs

- Mount Iou
- Taiho Sumo Memorial Hall (formerly the Kawayu Sumo Memorial Hall)
- Lake Kussharo

== See also ==
- List of railway stations in Japan
