= Teshikaga Town Kussharo Kotan Ainu Museum =

- 弟子屈町屈斜路コタンアイヌ民族資料館
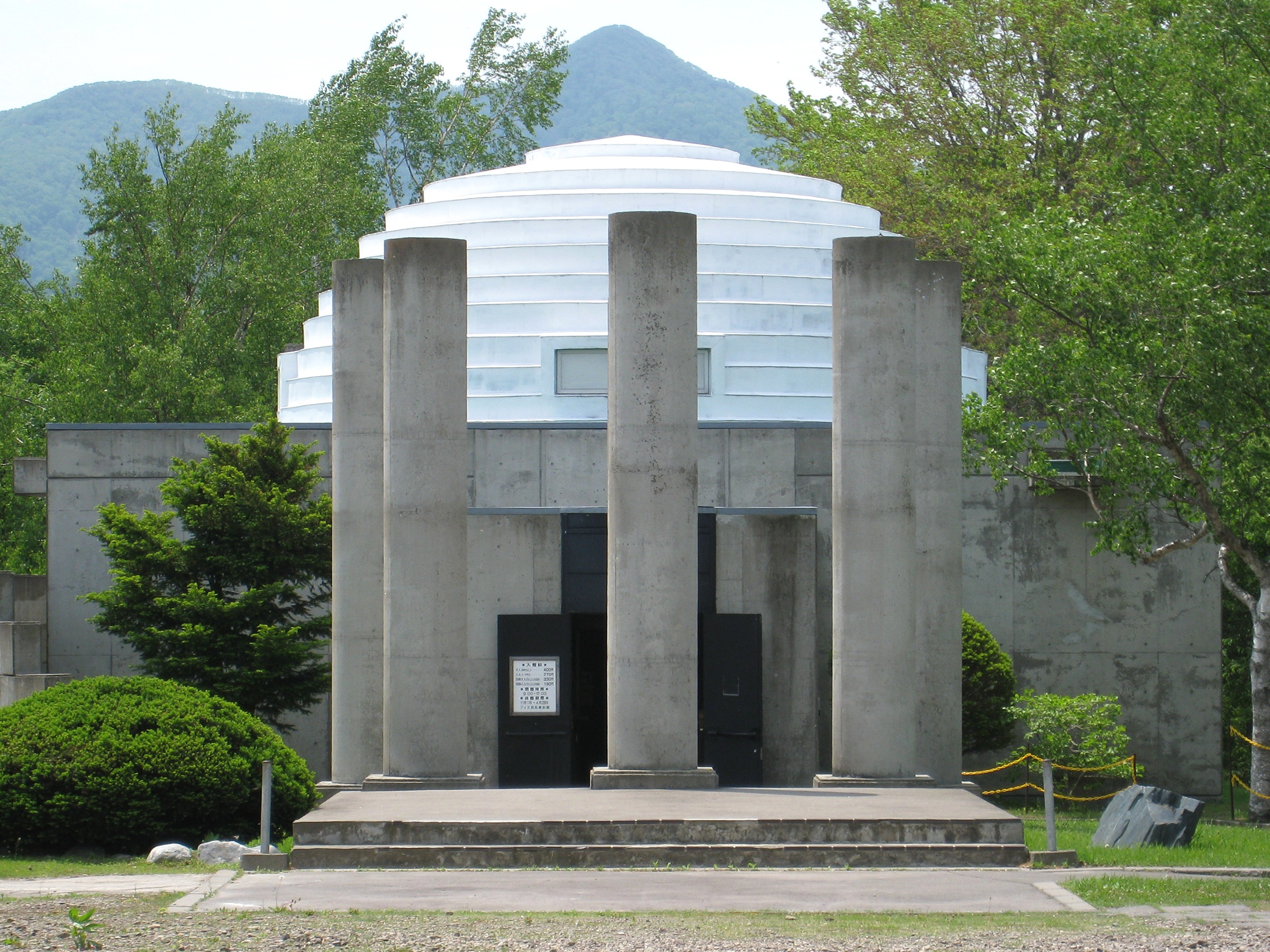
- Interactive map of the Teshikaga Town Kussharo Kotan Ainu Museum area

General information
- Location: Teshikaga, Hokkaido, Japan
- Coordinates: 43°33′48″N 144°20′32″E
- Opened: 6 June 1982

Website
- Official website (ja)

Teshikaga Town Kussharo Kotan Ainu Museum (弟子屈町屈斜路コタンアイヌ民族資料館, Teshikaga-chō Kussharo Kotan Ainu Minzoku Shiryōkan) is a museum of the local Ainu and their culture in Teshikaga, Hokkaido, Japan. It opened in 1982 on the shore of Lake Kussharo and has some 450 items on display, including materials relating to yukar and kotan.

== See also ==
- National Ainu Museum
