= Kotogatake Koichi =

Japanese sumo wrestler (1952–2024)

Personal information
- Native name: 琴ヶ嶽 綱一
- Born: Yoshikazu Takeuchi; 24 September 1952 Teshikaga, Japan
- Died: 24 February 2024 (aged 71) Hokkaido, Japan
- Height: 1.86 m (6 ft 1 in)
- Weight: 105 kg (231 lb)

Sport
- Sport: Sumo
- Retired: March, 1984
- Heya: Sadogatake
- Record: 493-472-1
- Debut: November, 1967
- Highest rank: Maegashira 1 (May 1977)
- Elder name: Shiratama
- Championships: 1 (Jūryō); 1 (Makushita)
- Updated on June 2020

Kotogatake Koichi (born Yoshikazu Takeuchi; 24 September 1952 – 24 February 2024) was a Japanese sumo wrestler from Teshikaga, Hokkaidō. He made his professional debut in November 1967 and reached the top division in July 1976. His highest rank was maegashira 1. Upon retirement from active competition he became an elder in the Japan Sumo Association. He left the Sumo Association in March 1995. Koichi died from heart failure on 24 February 2024, at the age of 71.

== Career record ==
Kotogatake Koichi
Year	January Hatsu basho, Tokyo	March Haru basho, Osaka	May Natsu basho, Tokyo	July Nagoya basho, Nagoya	September Aki basho, Tokyo	November Kyūshū basho, Fukuoka
1967	x	x	x	x	x	(Maezumo)
1968	West Jonokuchi #9; 5–2	West Jonidan #78; 3–4	East Jonidan #86; 6–1	West Jonidan #37; 2–5	West Jonidan #55; 3–4	West Jonidan #58; 4–3
1969	West Jonidan #42; 5–2	East Jonidan #10; 4–3	West Sandanme #89; 5–2	West Sandanme #56; 6–1	East Sandanme #17; 4–3	East Sandanme #6; 2–5
1970	East Sandanme #27; 4–3	West Sandanme #15; 3–4	West Sandanme #22; 5–2	East Makushita #59; 3–4	East Sandanme #7; 5–2	West Makushita #42; 2–5
1971	East Sandanme #1; 3–4	West Sandanme #9; 3–4	West Sandanme #16; 5–2	East Makushita #51; 4–3	East Makushita #46; 6–1	West Makushita #19; 2–5
1972	West Makushita #34; 5–2	East Makushita #20; 3–4	East Makushita #27; 3–4	West Makushita #32; 4–3	West Makushita #27; 3–4	West Makushita #32; 5–2
1973	West Makushita #16; 2–5	East Makushita #34; 5–2	West Makushita #21; 7–0; Champion	East Makushita #2; 4–3	West Makushita #1; 3–4	East Makushita #4; 6–1
1974	East Jūryō #13; 8–7	East Jūryō #11; 3–12	West Makushita #9; 3–4	East Makushita #16; 4–3	West Makushita #12; 3–4	East Makushita #17; 3–4
1975	West Makushita #24; 5–2	West Makushita #15; 6–1	West Makushita #4; 3–4	East Makushita #9; 5–2	West Makushita #2; 5–2	East Jūryō #13; 9–6
1976	East Jūryō #7; 8–7	East Jūryō #5; 8–7	East Jūryō #3; 9–6	West Maegashira #13; 8–7	West Maegashira #11; 5–10	East Jūryō #2; 8–7
1977	West Jūryō #1; 10–5; Champion	West Maegashira #12; 11–4	West Maegashira #1; 3–12	East Maegashira #11; 3–12	East Jūryō #4; 6–9	West Jūryō #9; 9–6
1978	East Jūryō #4; 10–5	East Maegashira #12; 6–9	West Jūryō #3; 5–10	West Jūryō #9; 8–7	East Jūryō #7; 8–7	West Jūryō #6; 7–8
1979	West Jūryō #8; 8–7	East Jūryō #6; 5–10	West Jūryō #12; 9–6	West Jūryō #6; 8–7	West Jūryō #4; 5–10	East Jūryō #13; 7–8
1980	East Makushita #1; 2–5	West Makushita #12; 6–1	East Makushita #3; 3–4	West Makushita #7; 5–2	East Makushita #2; 5–2	West Jūryō #11; 5–10
1981	West Makushita #4; 3–4	West Makushita #7; 5–2	East Makushita #2; 3–4	East Makushita #6; 5–2	West Makushita #1; 3–4	East Makushita #5; 5–2
1982	West Jūryō #11; 8–7	East Jūryō #8; 7–8	West Jūryō #11; 4–11	West Makushita #4; 5–2	West Jūryō #12; 8–7	East Jūryō #8; 6–9
1983	West Jūryō #10; 7–8	West Jūryō #13; 5–10	East Makushita #6; 3–4	East Makushita #12; 3–4	East Makushita #20; 4–3	East Makushita #15; 4–3
1984	West Makushita #7; 3–4	East Makushita #13; Retired; 1–5–1	x	x	x	x
Record given as wins–losses–absences Top division champion Top division runner-up Retired Lower divisions Non-participation Sanshō key: F=Fighting spirit; O=Outstanding performance; T=Technique Also shown: ★=Kinboshi; P=Playoff(s); Divisions: Makuuchi — Jūryō — Makushita — Sandanme — Jonidan — Jonokuchi Makuuchi ranks: Yokozuna — Ōzeki — Sekiwake — Komusubi — Maegashira

== See also ==
- Glossary of sumo terms
- List of past sumo wrestlers
- List of sumo tournament second division champions
