= Biruwa Station =

Railway station in Teshikaga, Hokkaido, Japan

B65 Biruwa Station 美留和駅
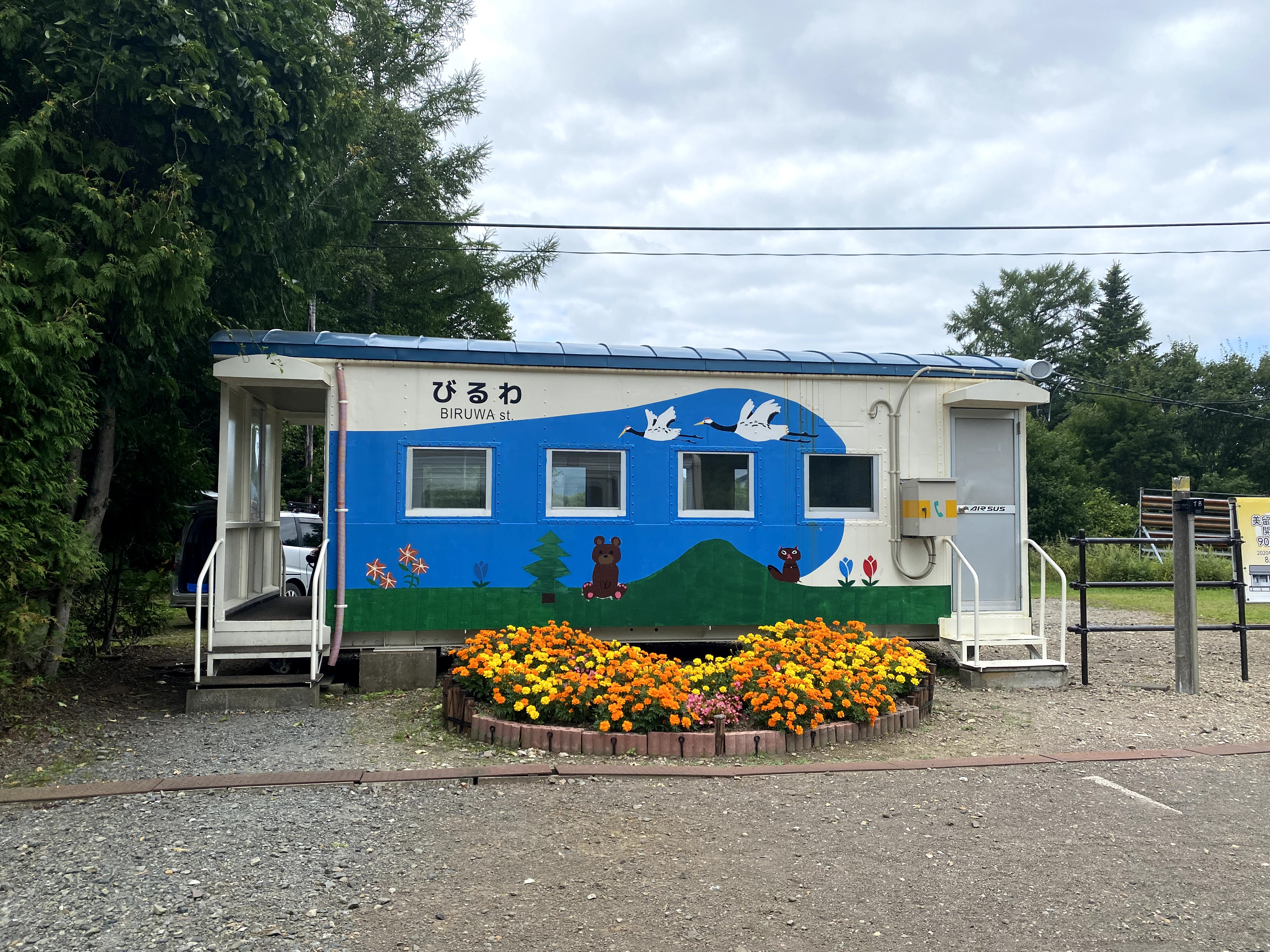
- Station building from Platform side, September 2021

General information
- Location: Biruwa, Teshikaga, Kawakami District, Hokkaido 088-3331; Japan
- Coordinates: 43°33′19″N 144°26′15.47″E
- System: regional rail
- Operator: JR Hokkaido
- Line: Senmō Main Line
- Distance: 79.2 km from Higashi-Kushiro
- Platforms: 1 side platform
- Tracks: 1

Other information
- Status: Unattended
- Station code: B65
- Website: Official website

History
- Opened: 20 April 1930; 96 years ago

Passengers
- FY2022: 2 daily

Services
Preceding station	JR Hokkaido	Following station
Kawayu-Onsen towards Abashiri	Senmō Main Line Local	Mashū towards Kushiro
Location
- Location within Hokkaido Location within Japan

Biruwa Station (美留和駅, Biruwa-eki) is a railway station located in the town of Teshikaga, Hokkaidō, Japan. It is operated by JR Hokkaido.

== Lines ==
The station is served by the Senmō Main Line, and lies 79.2 km from the starting point of the line at Higashi-Kushiro .

== Layout ==
Biruwa Station has one side platform serving a single bi-directional track. It formerly had a secondary main line, and a freight platform. The current station building is a re-purposed caboose. It is an unmanned station managed by Mashu Station.

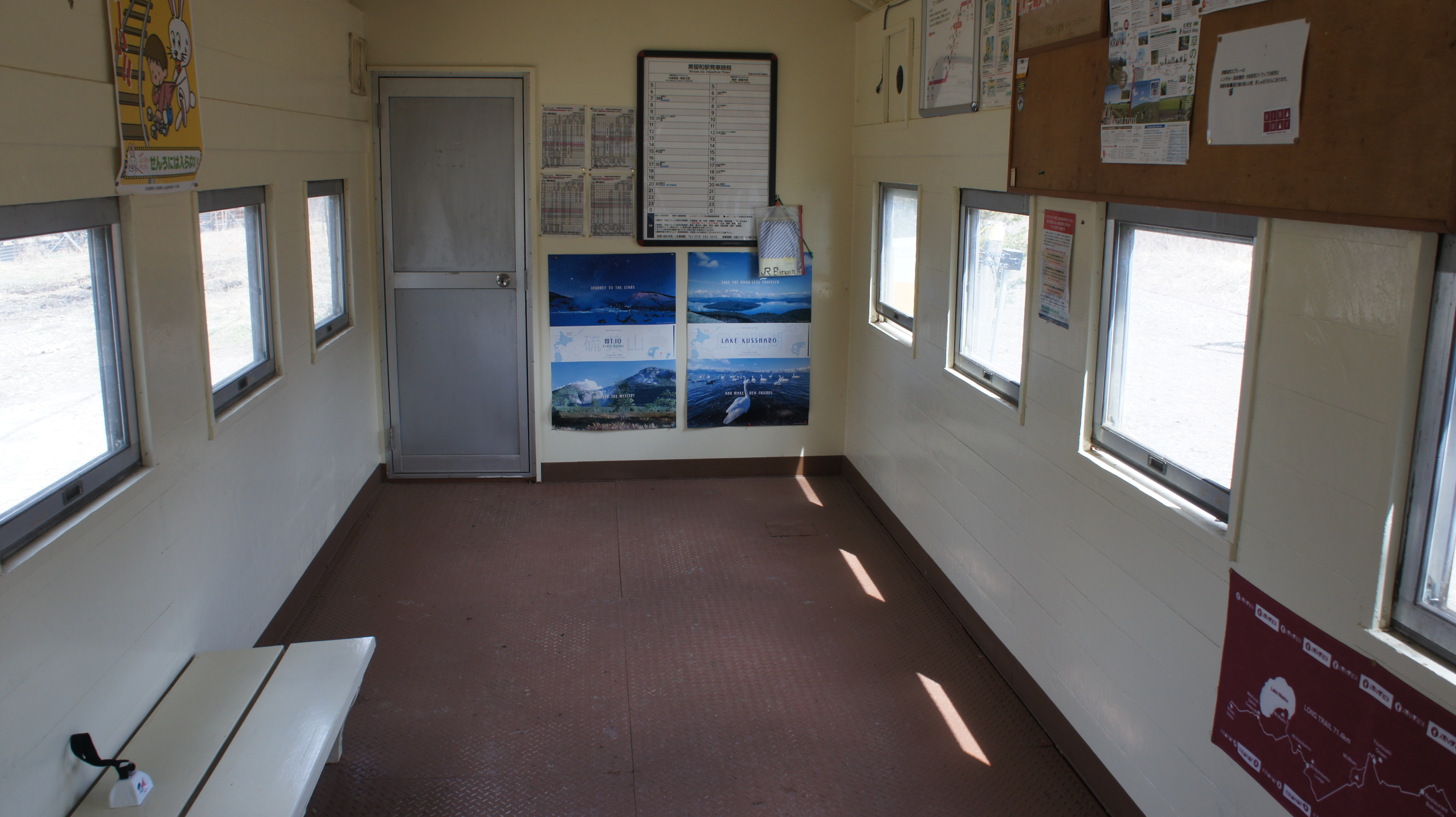
Waiting room

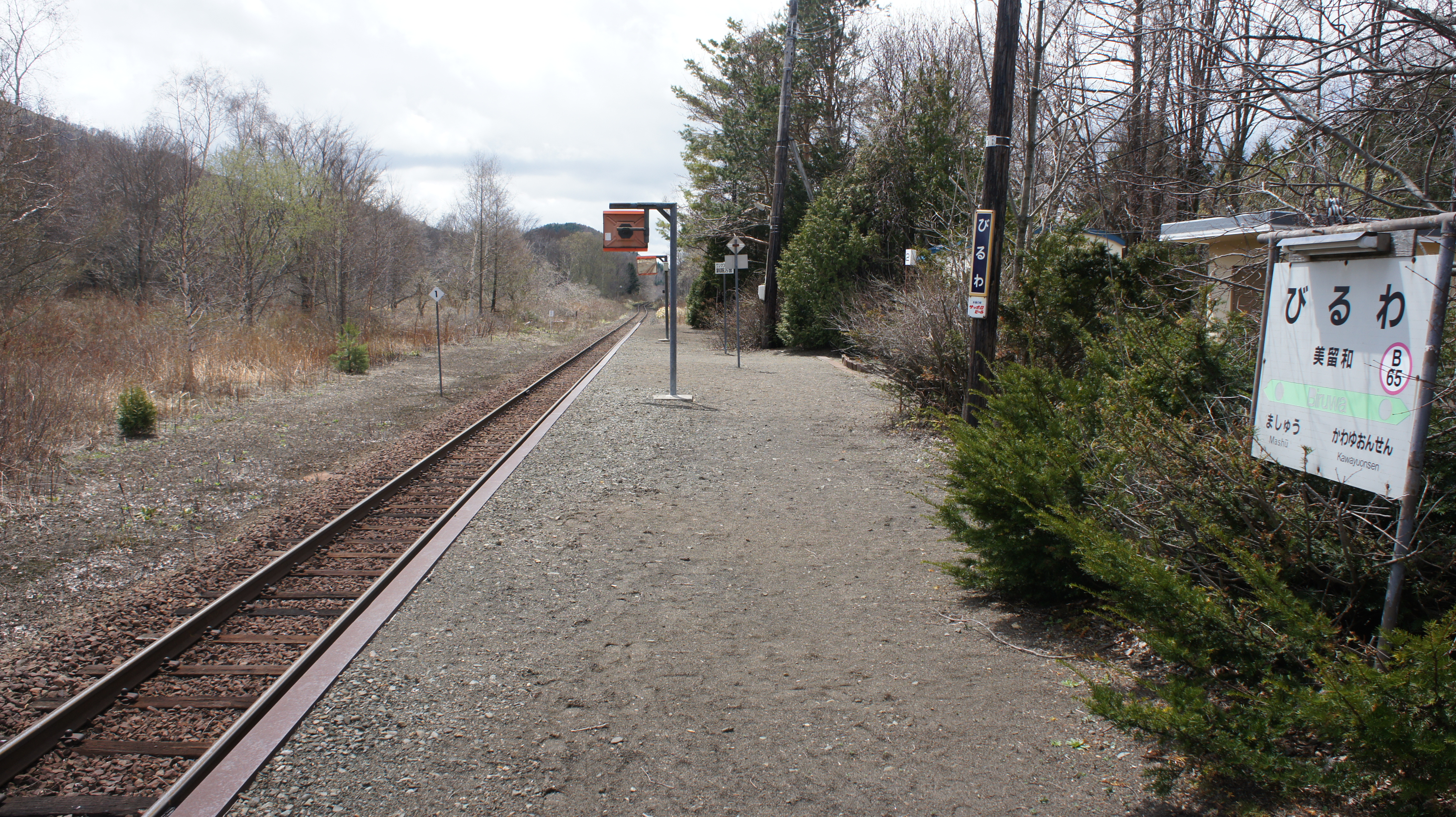
Platform

== History ==
The station opened on 20 April 1930 on the Japanese Government Railways Senmō Main Line. Following the privatization of the Japanese National Railways on 1 April 1987, the station came under the control of JR Hokkaido.

=== Future plans ===
In June 2023, this station was selected to be among 42 stations on the JR Hokkaido network to be slated for abolition owing to low ridership.

== Passenger statistics ==
In fiscal 2022, the station was used by an average of 2 passengers daily.

== Surrounding area ==
- Japan National Route 391
- Teshikaga Town Biruwa Elementary School

== See also ==
- List of railway stations in Japan
