= Teshikaga, Hokkaido =

Teshikaga 弟子屈町 Teshikaga-chō
- Town
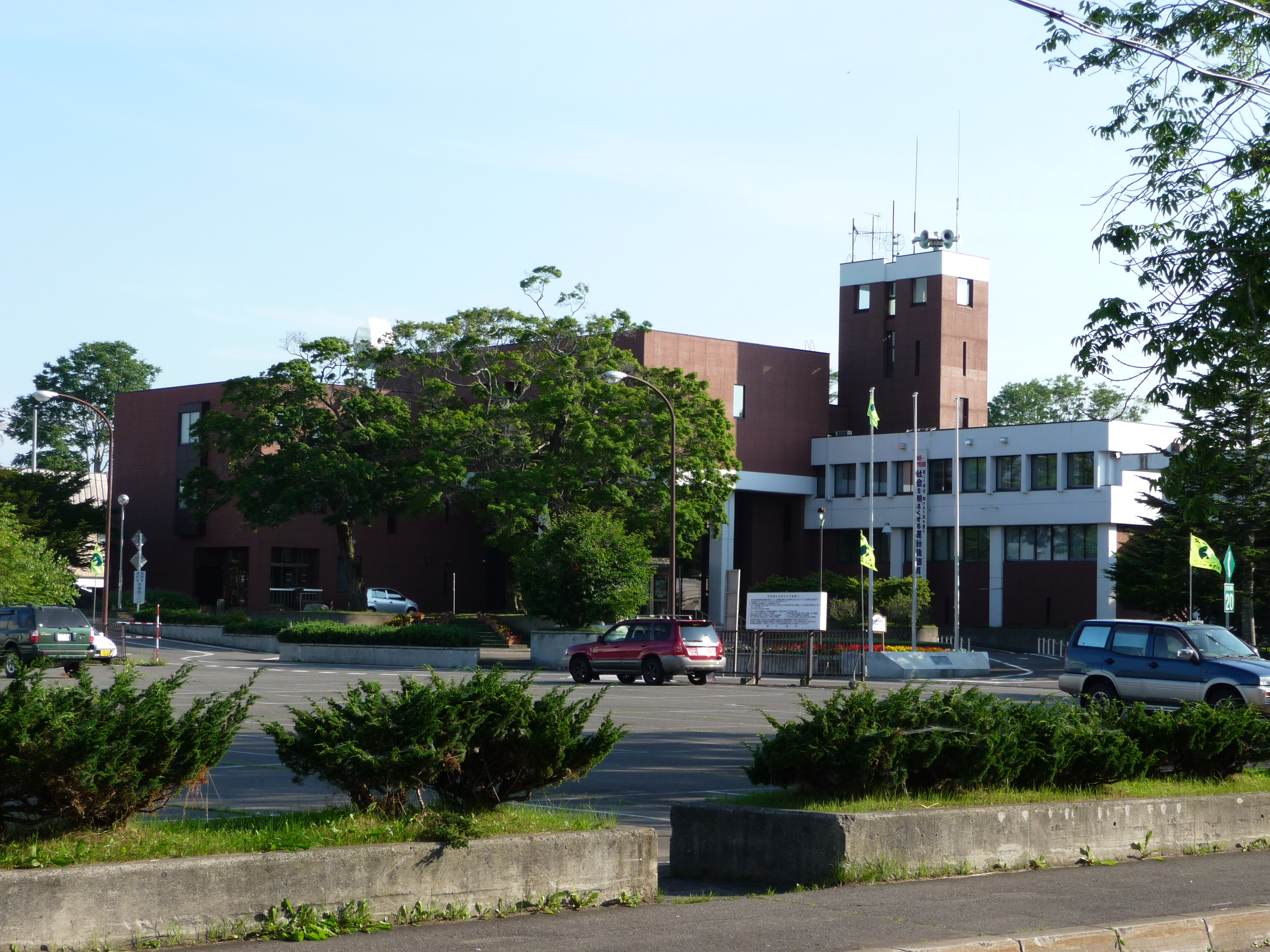
- Teshikaga Town Hall

- Flag Seal

- Location of Teshikaga in Hokkaido (Kushiro Subprefecture)
- Interactive map of Teshikaga
- Coordinates: 43°29′07″N 144°27′33″E
- Country: Japan
- Region: Hokkaido
- Prefecture: Hokkaido (Kushiro Subprefecture)
- District: Kawakami
- Established: 1900

Area
  - Total: 774.33 km^{2} (298.97 sq mi)

Population (November 30, 2025)
  - Total: 6,345
  - Density: 8.194/km^{2} (21.22/sq mi)
- Time zone: UTC+09:00 (JST)
- City hall address: 2-3-1 Chuo, Teshikaga-cho, Kawakami-gun, Hokkaido 088-3292
- Climate: Dfb
- Website: www.town.teshikaga.hokkaido.jp
- Symbols
- Bird: Swan
- Flower: Rhododendron
- Tree: Sakura

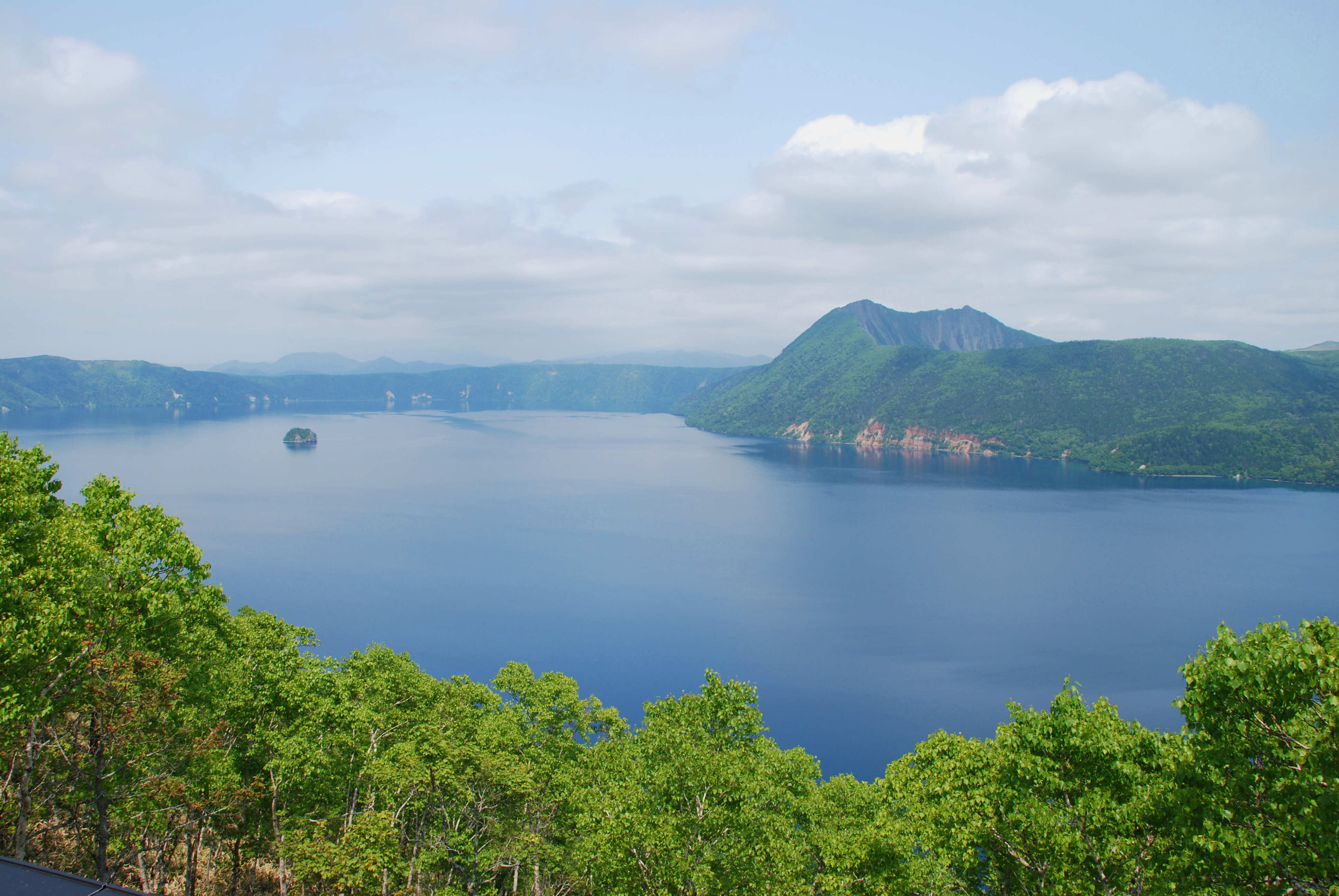
Lake Mashū

Teshikaga (弟子屈町, Teshikaga-chō) is a town located in Kushiro Subprefecture, Hokkaidō, Japan. As of 31 October 2025, the town had an estimated population of 6,345 in 3692 households, and a population density of 8.2 people per km^{2}. The total area of the town is 774.33 km^{2} (298.97 sq mi).

== Geography ==
Teshika is located in southeastern Hokkaido, at the foot of the Kussharo Caldera and the Mashū Caldera to its east, and to the east is the Nemuro Plateau. To the south it borders Shibecha Town and is connected to the Kushiro Wetlands. Approximately 70% of the town is covered by mountains and forests. Mount Mokoto, at 1000 meters, is the highest elevation in the town. Much of Teshika is within the borders of the Akan Mashu National Park. Lake Mashū (Ainu: Kamuy-to), Lake Kussharo (Ainu: Kutcar or Kutcaro), volcanic caldera lakes are located in the town.

=== Neighboring municipalities ===
  - Shibecha
  - Tsubetsu
  - Bihoro
  - Koshimizu
  - Kiyosato
  - Nakashibetsu

=== Climate ===
According to the Köppen climate classification, Teshikaga has a humid continental climate. The climate of Teshikaga is cool, with an average annual temperature of 5 °C. The first snowfall occurs in early November, with snowfall of around 50–100 cm. However, from December to March, the average temperature drops below freezing, making it extremely cold. The Kawayu area of Teshikaga has recorded temperatures below -30 °C.

Climate data for Teshikaga (1991−2020 normals, extremes 1977−present)
Month	Jan	Feb	Mar	Apr	May	Jun	Jul	Aug	Sep	Oct	Nov	Dec	Year
Record high °C (°F)	6.2 (43.2)	7.6 (45.7)	16.4 (61.5)	27.5 (81.5)	35.7 (96.3)	33.7 (92.7)	34.4 (93.9)	34.4 (93.9)	31.3 (88.3)	24.7 (76.5)	19.1 (66.4)	12.9 (55.2)	35.7 (96.3)
Mean daily maximum °C (°F)	−3.1 (26.4)	−2.7 (27.1)	1.4 (34.5)	8.2 (46.8)	14.6 (58.3)	17.8 (64.0)	21.2 (70.2)	22.4 (72.3)	19.6 (67.3)	14.1 (57.4)	6.9 (44.4)	−0.2 (31.6)	10.0 (50.0)
Daily mean °C (°F)	−7.2 (19.0)	−7.1 (19.2)	−2.9 (26.8)	2.8 (37.0)	8.5 (47.3)	12.5 (54.5)	16.4 (61.5)	17.9 (64.2)	14.9 (58.8)	8.9 (48.0)	2.1 (35.8)	−4.5 (23.9)	5.2 (41.3)
Mean daily minimum °C (°F)	−12.6 (9.3)	−12.7 (9.1)	−8.0 (17.6)	−2.2 (28.0)	3.1 (37.6)	8.1 (46.6)	12.7 (54.9)	14.3 (57.7)	10.6 (51.1)	3.4 (38.1)	−3.2 (26.2)	−9.9 (14.2)	0.3 (32.5)
Record low °C (°F)	−23.1 (−9.6)	−26.7 (−16.1)	−21.1 (−6.0)	−14.7 (5.5)	−5.3 (22.5)	−0.9 (30.4)	2.0 (35.6)	5.6 (42.1)	−1.0 (30.2)	−8.0 (17.6)	−16.3 (2.7)	−21.4 (−6.5)	−26.7 (−16.1)
Average precipitation mm (inches)	50.6 (1.99)	43.4 (1.71)	64.5 (2.54)	82.3 (3.24)	99.9 (3.93)	80.2 (3.16)	106.2 (4.18)	154.3 (6.07)	154.1 (6.07)	119.2 (4.69)	71.6 (2.82)	66.0 (2.60)	1,092.3 (43.00)
Average precipitation days (≥ 1.0 mm)	9.4	7.7	9.6	10.6	10.4	9.4	11.1	11.9	12.1	10.1	9.3	9.6	121.2
Mean monthly sunshine hours	134.2	139.7	163.6	157.7	162.7	133.2	108.4	115.6	131.3	150.7	134.4	132.9	1,664.4
Source: Japan Meteorological Agency

== Demographics ==
Per Japanese census data, the population of Teshikaga has declined in recent decades.

Historical population
Year	Pop.	±%
1970	18,114	—
1980	15,940	−12.0%
1990	14,093	−11.6%
2000	12,307	−12.7%
2010	10,630	−13.6%
2020	8,892	−16.3%

== History ==
Remains of dwellings from the Jōmon period have been found within the town, including the Kussharo Kotan Ruins, indicating that people have lived there since ancient times. Records by Matsuura Takeshiro and others indicate that during the Edo period, Ainu people lived in settlements in Tesukaka (present-day Teshikaga) and Kutcharo (Kussharo). A sulfur mine was established in 1876, and was eventually transferred to the Yasuda zaibatsu. In 1888, the Kushiro Railway, Hokkaido's second railway line, was laid between Ioyama and Shibecha for transportation purposes. However, overexploitation led to resource depletion, and operations ceased nine years later in 1896. Japanese farming settlement had started from 1880 In 1890, the Teshikaga Imperial Estate was established under the jurisdiction of the Imperial Household Ministry's Imperial Estates Bureau as a forestry estate. In 1923, Teshikaga was incorporated as a second-class village. It became a first-class village in 1943 and was raised to town status in 1947.

== Government ==
Teshikaga has a mayor-council form of government with a directly elected mayor and a unicameral town council of 11 members. Teshikaga, as part of Kushiro Subprefecture, contributes one member to the Hokkaidō Prefectural Assembly. In terms of national politics, the town is part of the Hokkaidō 7th district of the lower house of the Diet of Japan.

== Economy ==
The main industries in Teshikaga are tourism and dairy farming. Lake Mashū, Lake Kussharo, ski resorts, and hot spring resorts such as Mashū Onsen, and Kawayu Onsen are major tourist destinations, attracting many tourists from all over the country.

== Education ==
Teshikaga has four public elementary schools and two public middle schools operated by the town government and one public high school operated by the Hokkaido Board of Education. The Kitami Institute of Technology Kussharo Training Center, the Teshikaga Crustal Movement Observatory of Hokkaido University and the Cold Region Biological Production Research Facility of Tamagawa University's College of Agriculture are located in the town.

== Transportation ==
JR Hokkaido - Senmō Main Line

■ Kawayu-Onsen - Biruwa - Mashū

=== Highways ===
- National Route 241
- National Route 243
- National Route 391

== Local attractions ==
- Akan Mashu National Park
- Lake Mashū
- Lake Kussharo
- Kotan Onsen
- Teshikaga Town Kussharo Kotan Ainu Museum
- Wakoto Onsen
- Kawayu Onsen
- Mount Iō
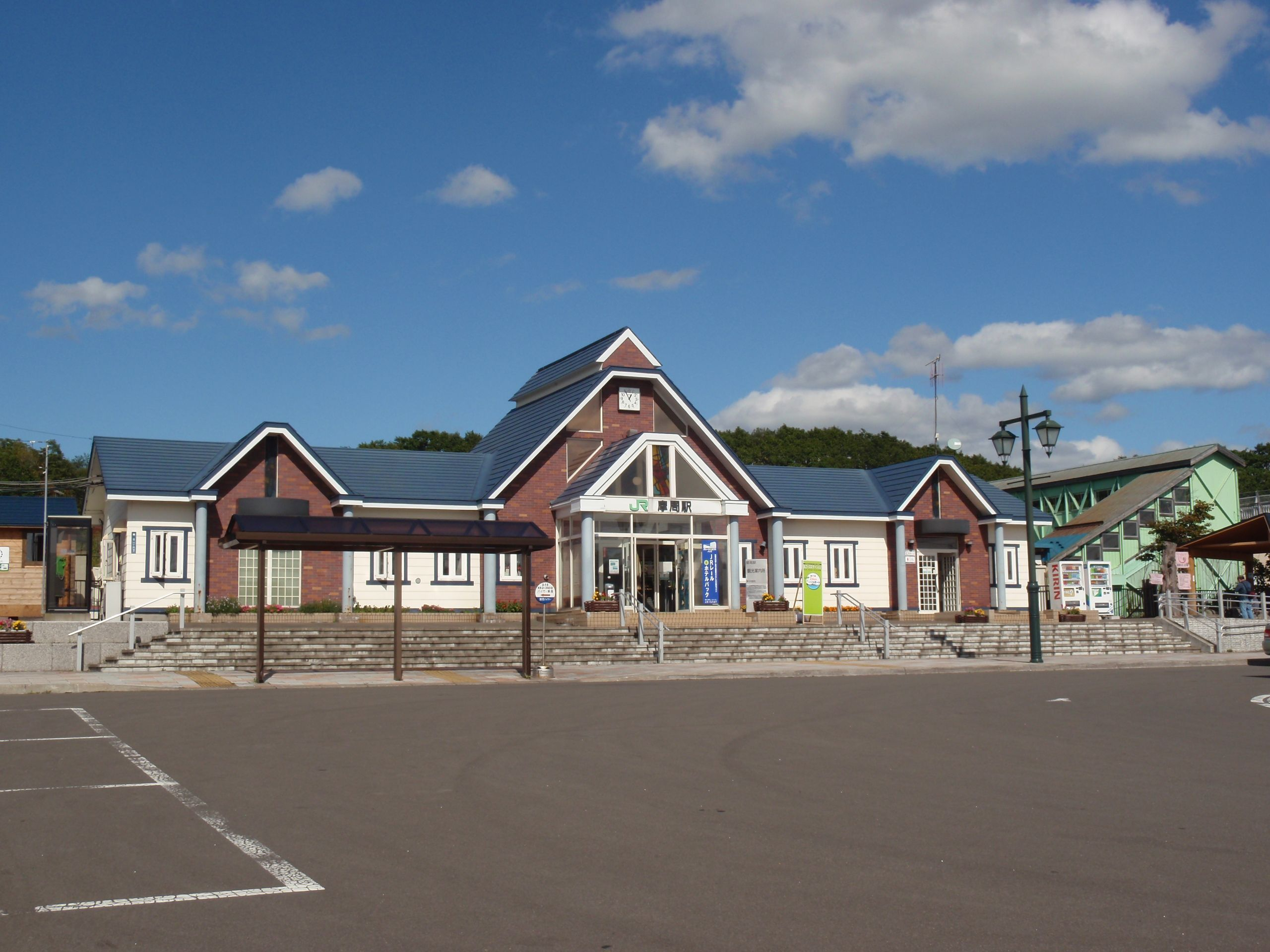
Mashū railway station

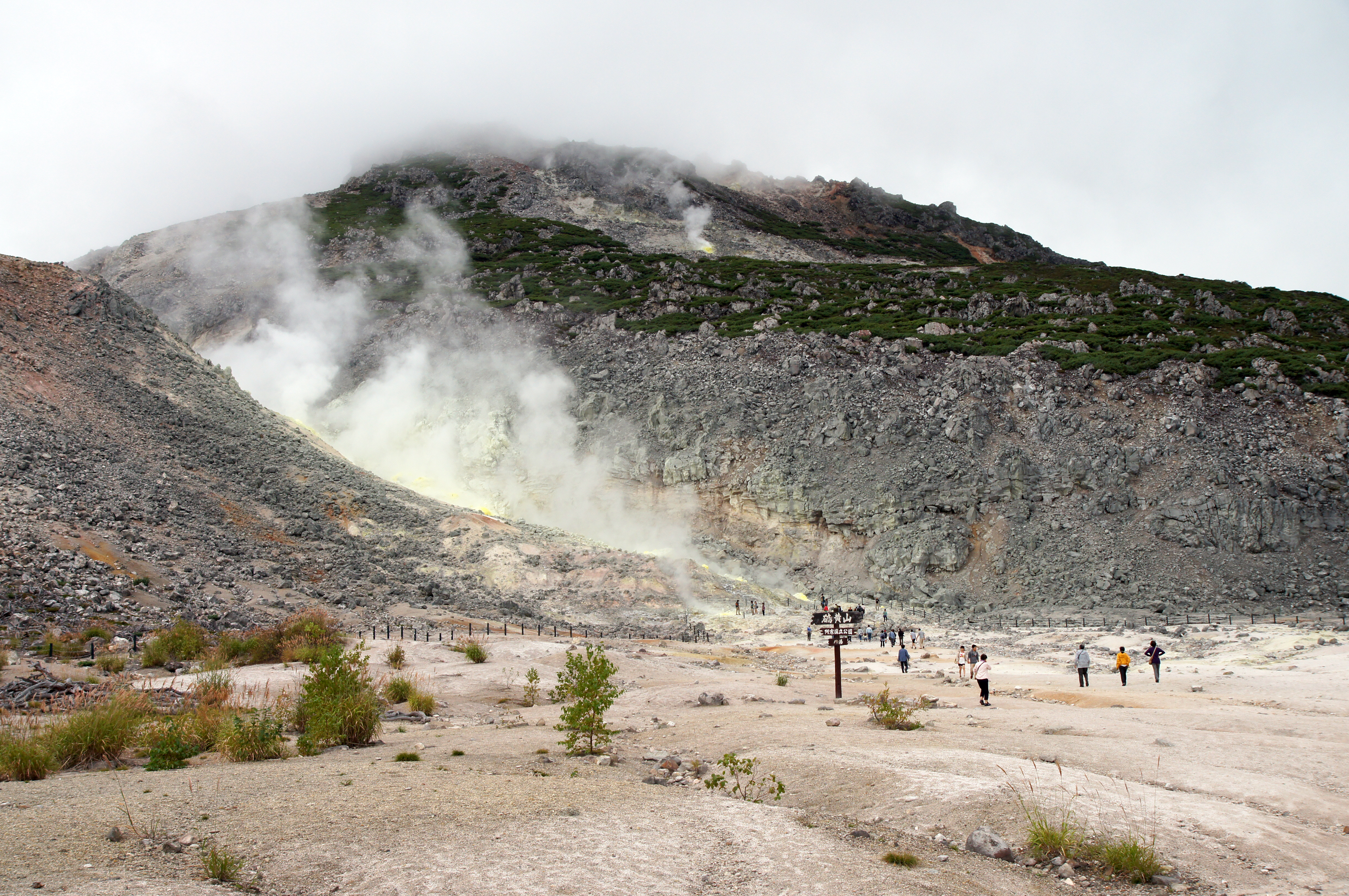
Mount Io

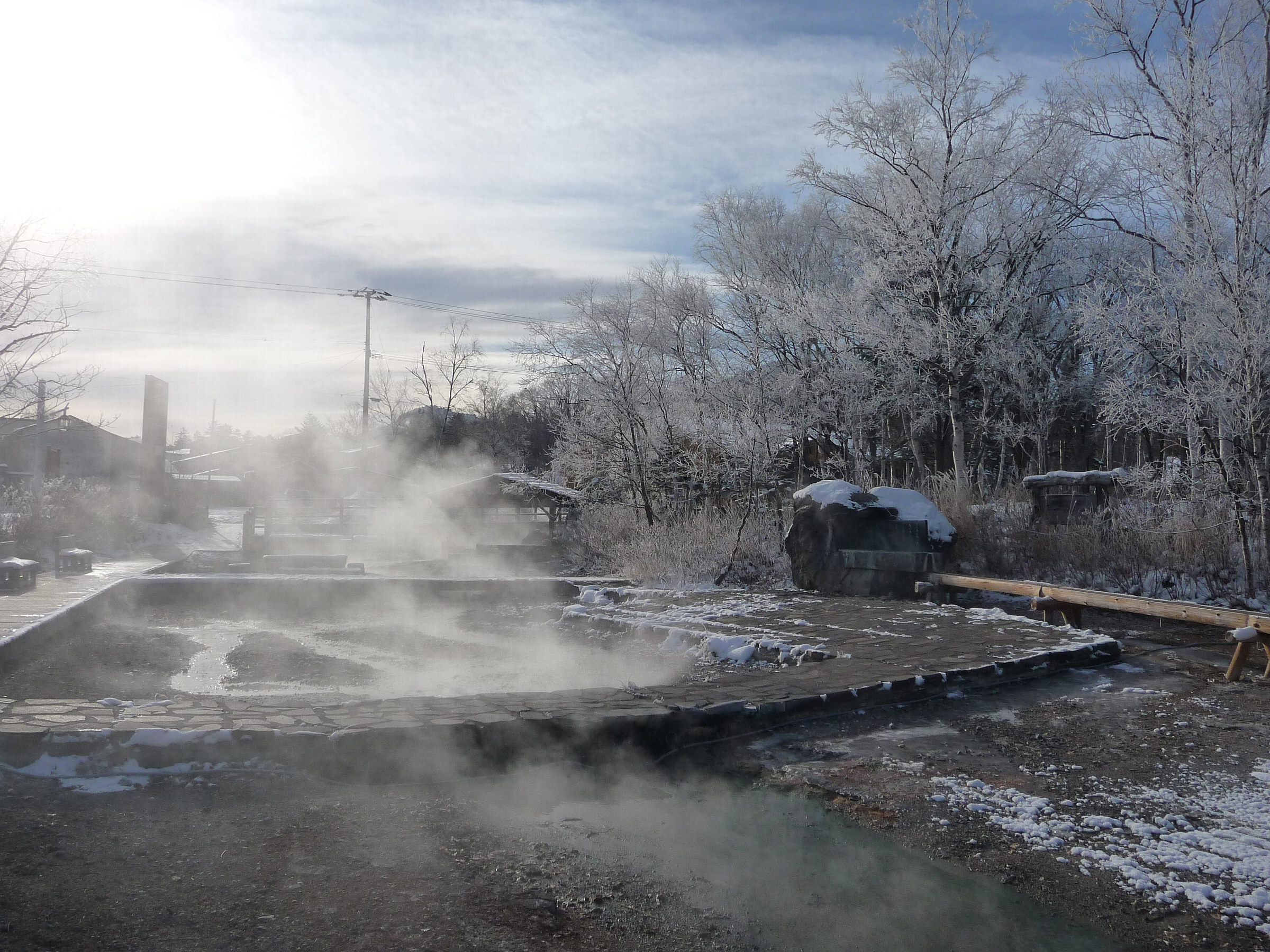
Kawayu Onsen

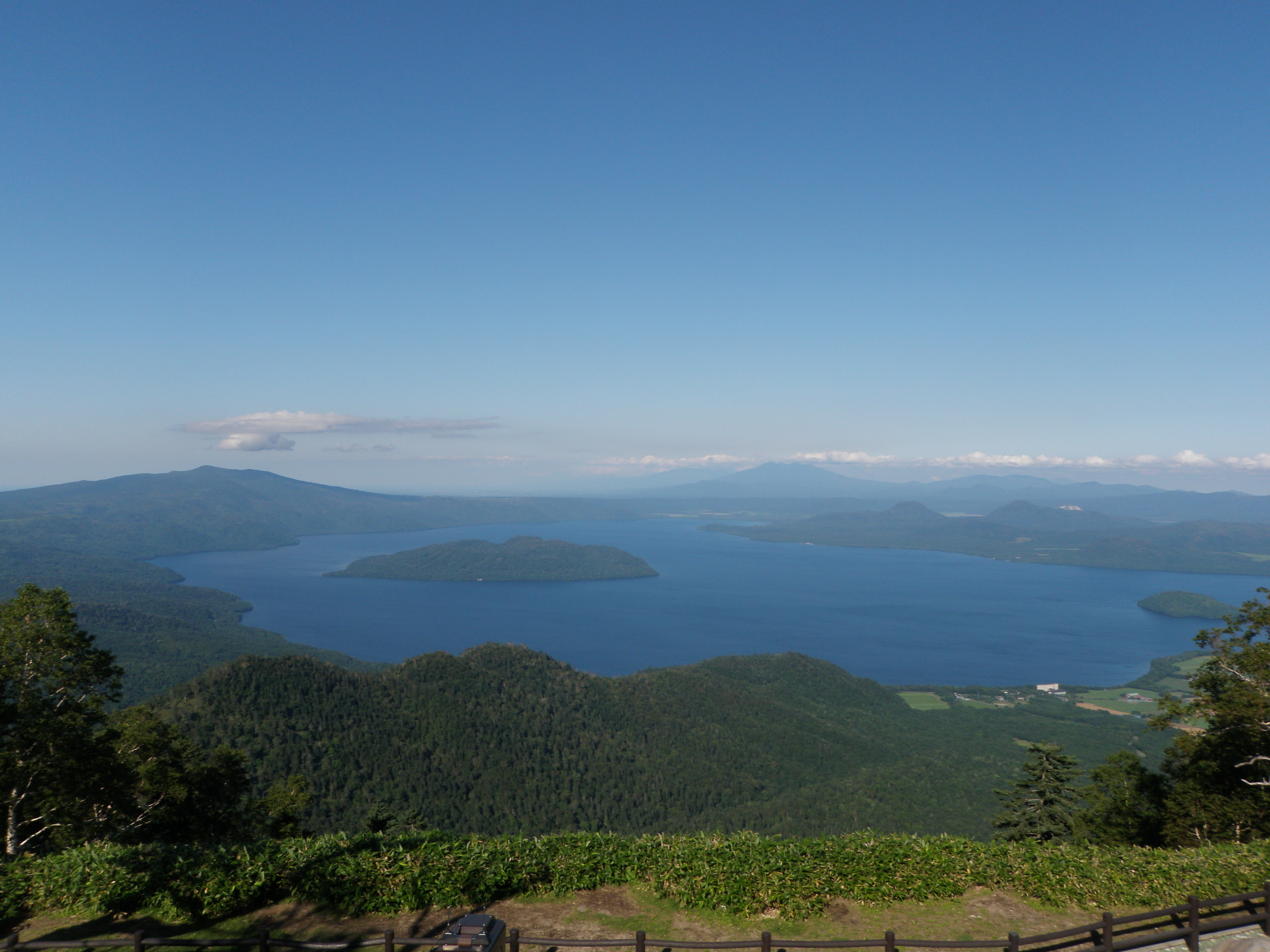
Lake Kussharo from Tsubetsu pass

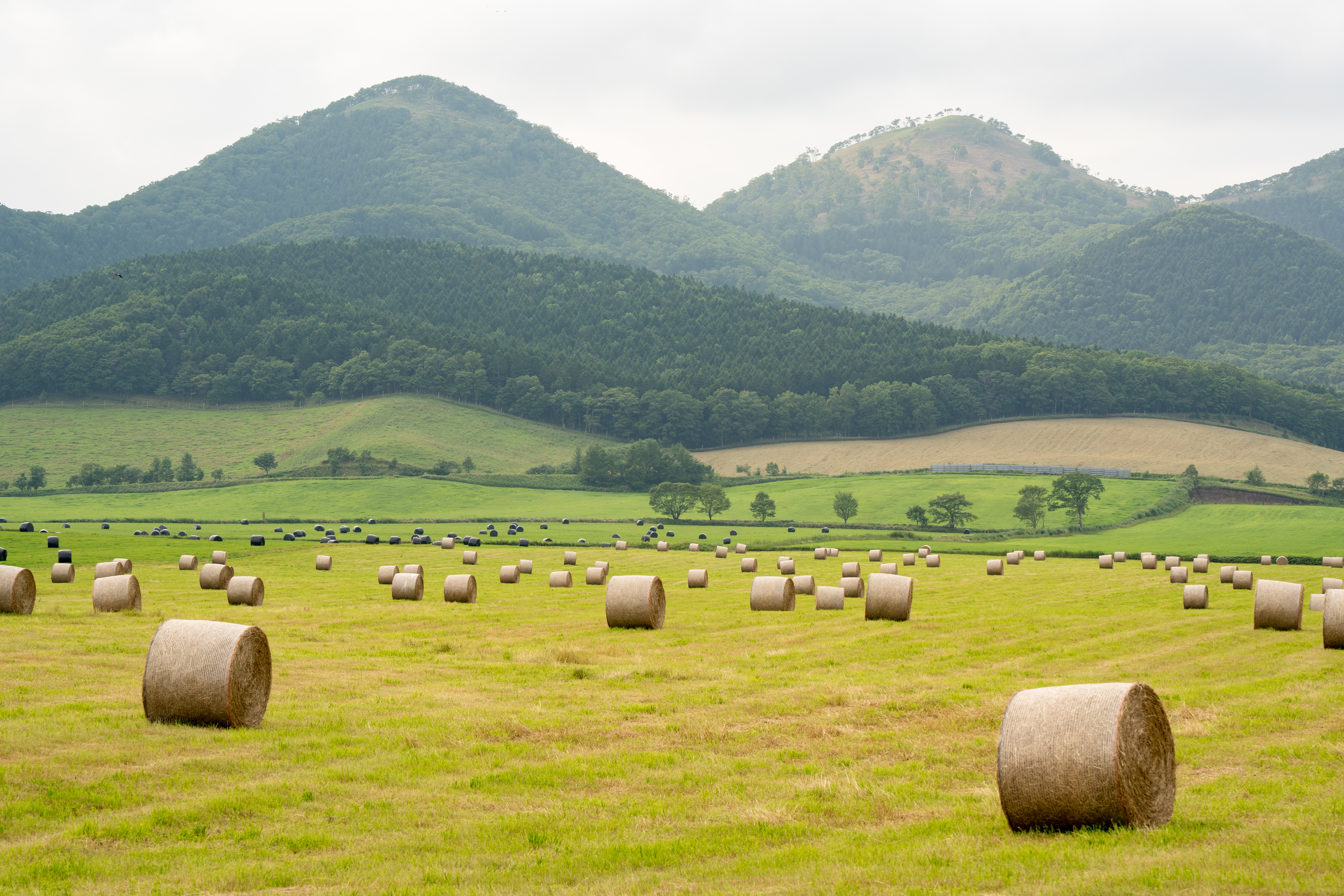
Straw bales on a stubble field in Teshikaga

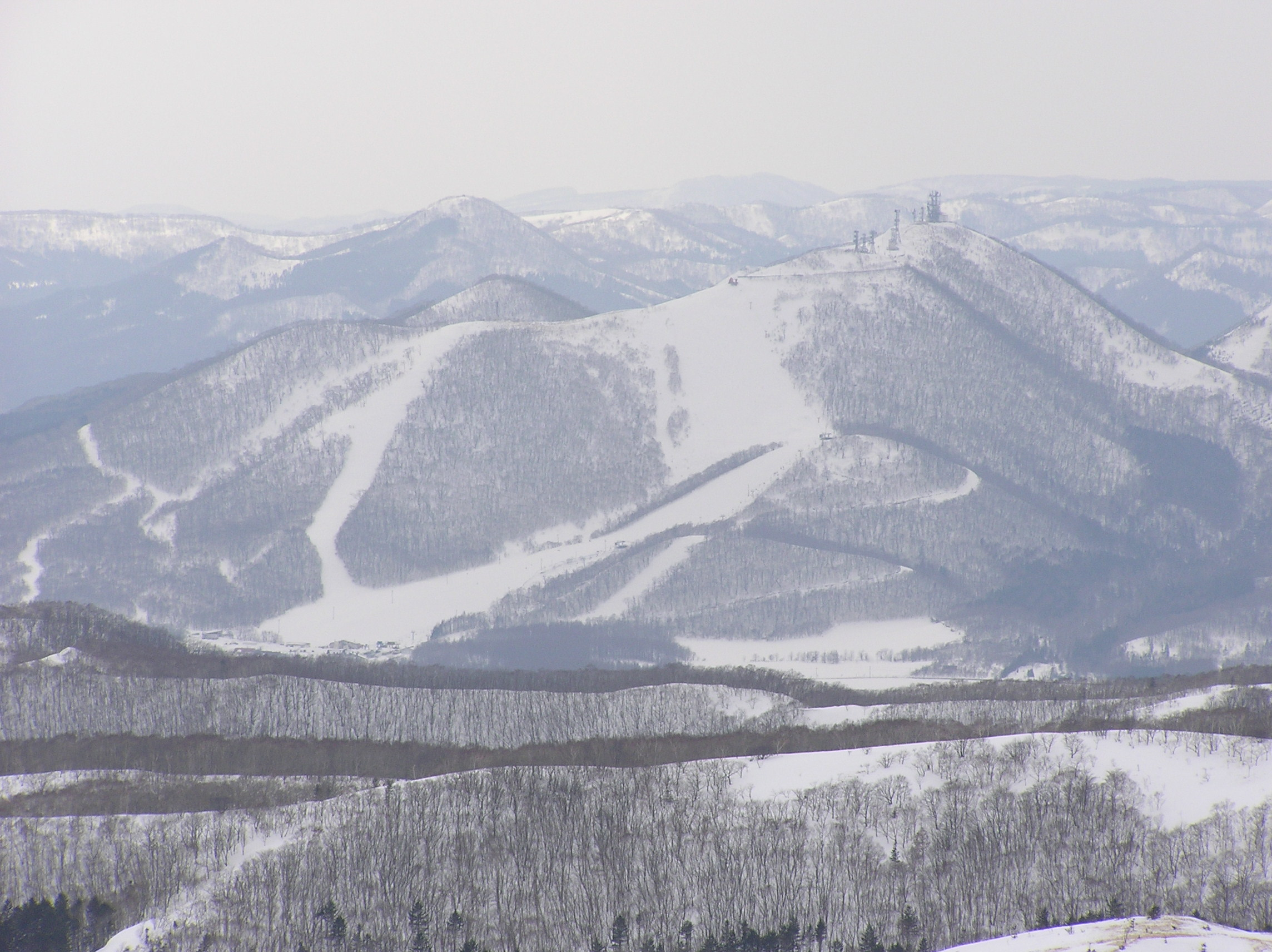
RBirao Ski Resort

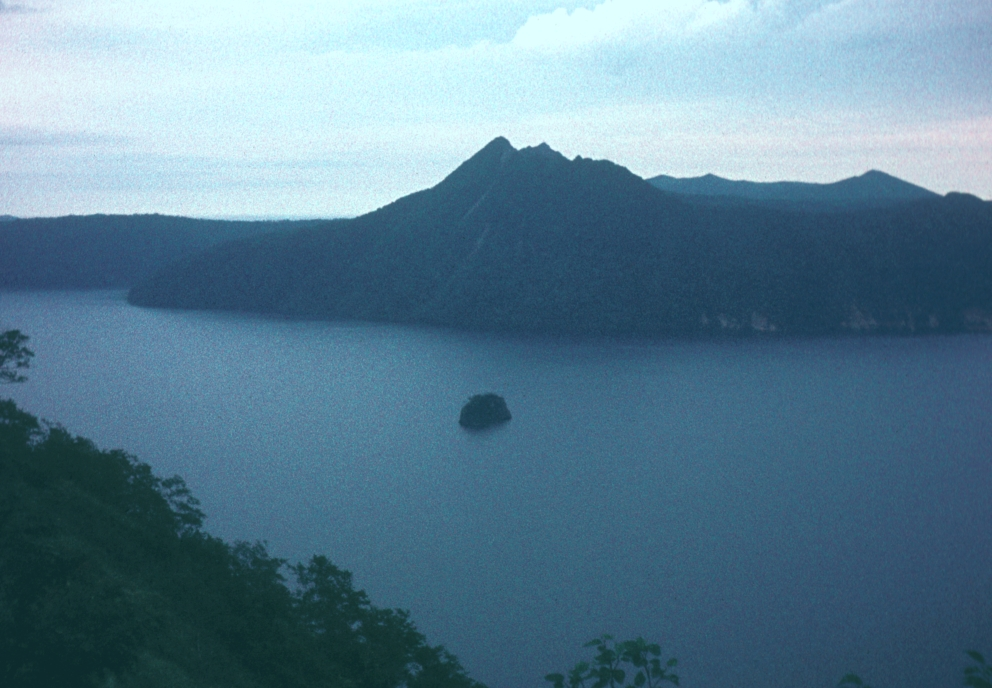
Lake Mashū

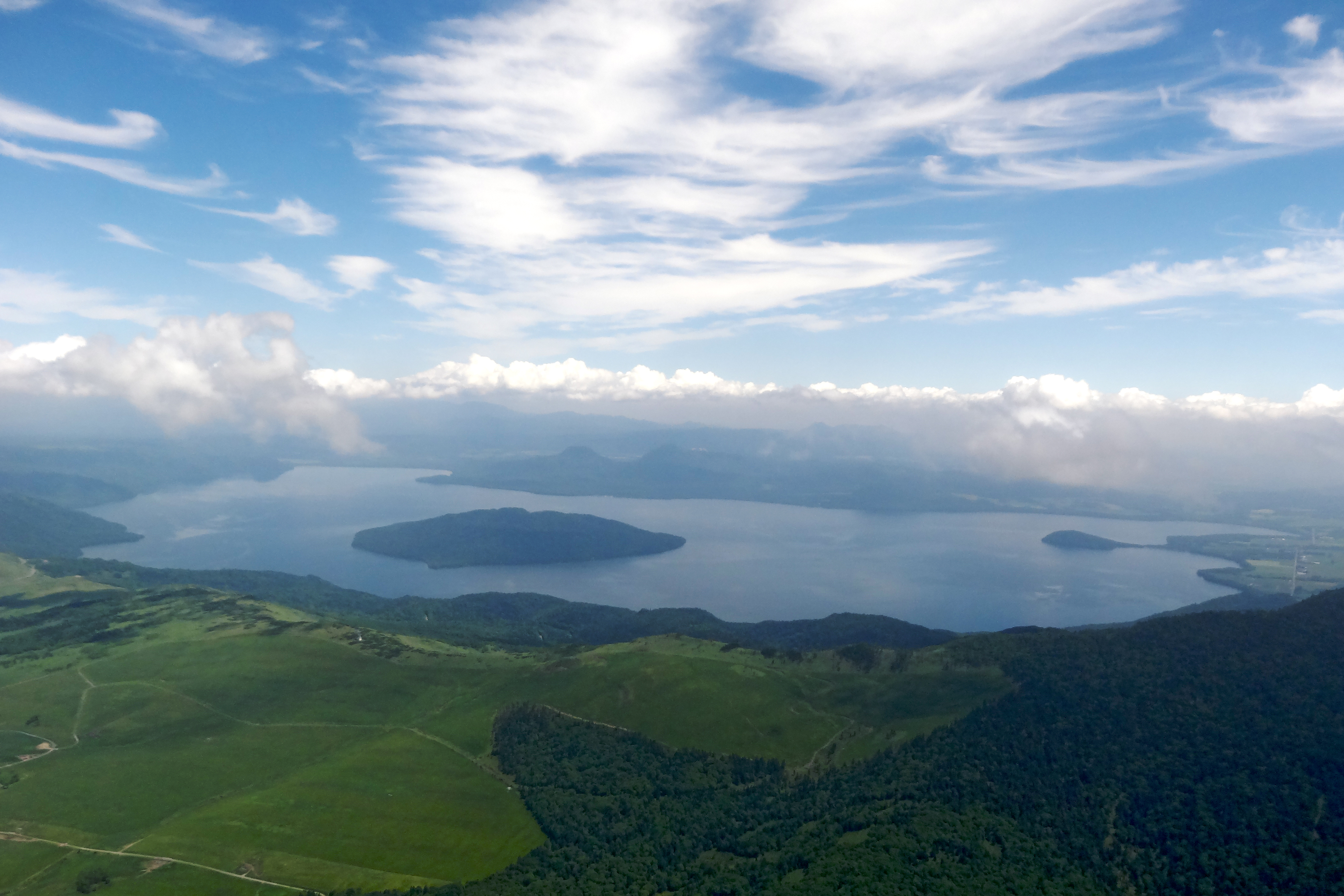
Lake Kussharo

== Notable people from Teshikaga ==
- Kotogatake Koichi - sumo wrestler
- Taiho Koki - sumo wrestler (born on Sakhalin but moved to Teshikaga aged 5)
